= Ortega =

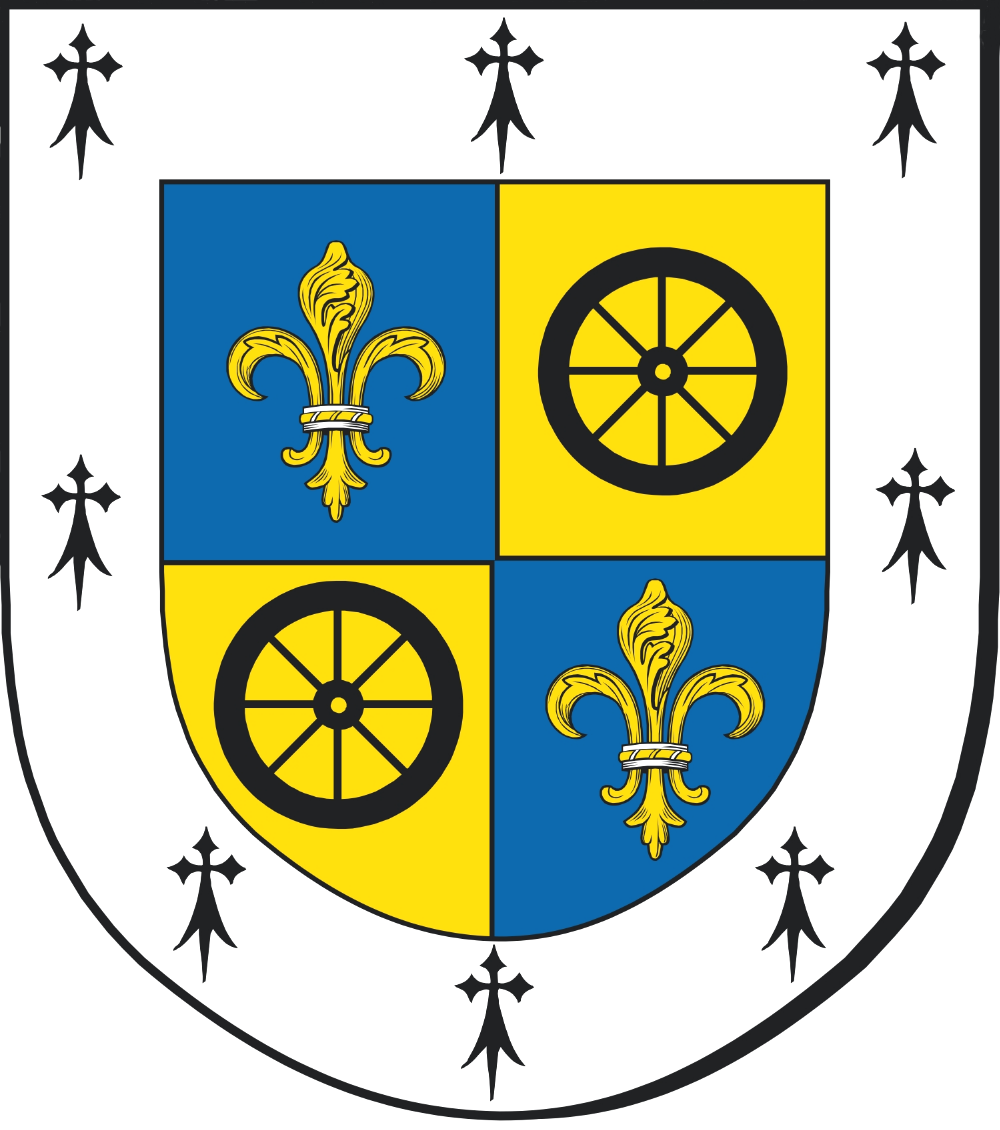
- Ortega shield (quartered)
- Pronunciation: UK: /ɔːrˈteɪɡə/ or-TAY-gə; US: /ɔːrˈtiːɡə/ or-TEE-gə; Spanish: [oɾˈteɣa]
- Language: Spanish

Origin
- Language: Latin
- Origin: ū̆rtīca
- Meaning: 'nettle', from a toponym
- Region of origin: Spain; from the Autonomous Communities of: Castile and León, Aragon, Navarre, La Rioja, Cantabria, Basque Country

Other names
- Variant forms: Ortego, de Ortega, Ortegón, Ortegada, Ortegal, Hortega, Ortiga, Ortigueda, Ortigueira, Ortigosa, Orreaga

Ortega is a Spanish surname. A baptismal record in 1570 records a de Ortega "from the village of Ortega". There were several villages of this name in Spain. The toponym derives from Latin urtica, meaning 'nettle'.

Some of the Ortega spelling variants are Ortega, Ortego, de Ortega, Ortegada, Ortegal, Hortega, Ortiga, Ortigueda, Ortigueira, Ortigosa, Orreaga, etc. A cognate surname in Italian is Ortica or Ortichi, in Romanian Urzică, in French Ortie, all from Latin urtica.

== Origin ==
Roberto Faure, coauthor of the Diccionario de Apellidos Españoles, states that Ortega is derived from the noun ortega, a variant of the modern Castilian Spanish ortiga "nettle". The name of the plant is found as a toponym in various places in Spain, such as Ortega (Burgos), Ortega (Jaén) or Ortega (Monfero, A Coruña). Mexican author Gutierre Tibón advanced the alternative theory that the name derives from Ortún, earlier Fortún, from the Latin name Fortunius with an added suffix "-eca". The Dictionary of American Surnames additionally states that the name may derive from ortega: "black grouse."

The first Bishop of Almería, Juan de Ortega, died in the early 16th century, while another early occurrence is found in the baptismal record of Phelpa de Ortega, dated 2 March 1570 at Santa Maria Magdalena, Valladolid, Spain, during the reign of King Philip II of Spain. Other early records are found in Carrión de los Condes, Palencia. The name subsequently appears throughout Spain, especially in Castile, Andalusia and Murcia, as well as Mexico and Latin America.

According to the Diccionario de Heráldica Aragonesa by Bizén d'O Río Martínez, there were two Aragonese lines using the surname, one of which was infanzon. Both lines originated in Cinco Villas and bore coats of arms that were variants of each other. One line is in Gallur in the 18th century, and in Tauste in the 19th century. The other is attested from 1626 in various locations in Aragón.

== Coats of arms ==
There were three arms-bearing families called Ortega. Their coat of arms were as follows:

- In a field of blue, six bands of gold and a red border of gules with 10 saltire crosses of gold.
- Divided horizontally, a gold fleur de lis on a blue background on the left side, and a black wheel on a gold background on the right. The entire shield has a silver border decorated with black ermine marks. These Ortegas were found primarily in Aragón at Gallur, Tauste, and originating in the Cinco Villas.
- Divided in quarters, with the gold fleur de lis on blue in the upper left and lower right, and the black wheel on gold in upper right and lower left. This shield also has the silver ermine border. The full coat of arms includes a helmet with three ostrich feathers and an armored arm holding a sword, above a crown of the Count. These Ortegas came from the Carrión de los Condes in the province of Palencia, moving to Castresana de Losa in the province of Burgos, all in the autonomous community of Castile-Leon, later branching to other autonomous communities in Spain. This coat of arms can be found among the Ortegas in the New World, a line bearing titles of Condes de Ortigueira y Monterroso, Valle de Oploca y Santa María de Guadalupe del Peñasco.

== Notable people named Ortega ==
=== Politicians ===
- Bobby Ortega (1939–2017), Filipino retired police officer and politician
- Carlos Ortega (born c. 1945), Venezuelan union and political leader
- Cynthia Ortega (b. 1956), Dutch politician
- Daniel Ortega (born 1945), past and present President of Nicaragua
- Francisco Ortega (1904–1967), Filipino lawyer and politician
- Francisco Ortega III (born 1967), Filipino politician
- Humberto Ortega (born 1947), Nicaraguan military leader
- Ivonne Ortega (born 1972), governor of Yucatán
- Jesús Ortega (born 1952), Mexican left-wing politician
- José Francisco Ortega (1734–1798), soldier and early settler of California
- Juan Ortega y Montañés (1627–1708), Spanish bishop and colonial administrator
- Katherine D. Ortega (born 1934), 38th treasurer of the United States
- Luisa Ortega Diaz (born c. 1958), Venezuelan lawyer
- Mario Eduardo Ortega (born 1956), Filipino politician
- Paolo Ortega (born 1984), Filipino politician
- Raphaelle Ortega-David (born 1997), Filipino politician
- Titing Ortega (1916–1996), Filipino politician
- Victor Ortega (born 1934), Filipino lawyer and politician

=== Artists and entertainers ===
- Aniceto Ortega del Villar (1825–1875), Count of Guadalupe del Peñasco and Oploca of San Ángel in Casa Blanca, a Mexican physician, composer and pianist who is related to the Colonial Administrator (Viceroy) and Archbishop of Mexico, Juan Ortega y Montañés
- Anthony Ortega (musician) (1928–2022), American jazz musician
- Armando Ortega, Mexican composer, conductor, singer, painter
- Ashley Ortega (born 1998), Filipina actress and professional figure skater
- Cris Ortega (born 1980), Spanish artist and writer
- Dave Ortega, American comics artist
- Emanuel Ortega, Argentine singer
- Fernando Ortega (born 1957), American singer-songwriter
- Frank Ortega (1927–1994), American pianist, composer, arranger
- Gilberto Hernández Ortega (1924–1978), Dominican painter
- Jeannie Ortega (born 1986), American actress, dancer and songwriter
- Jenna Ortega (born 2002), American actress
- José Benito Ortega (1858–1941), American sculptor and Santero
- José Gómez Ortega (1895–1920), Spanish bullfighter
- José Ortega Cano (born 1953), Spanish bullfighter
- Kenny Ortega (born 1950), American producer, director and choreographer
- Lindi Ortega (born 1980), Canadian singer-songwriter
- Leanor Ortega, former member of the group Five Iron Frenzy
- Manuel Ortega (painter) (1921–2014), Spanish painter
- Manuel Ortega (singer) (born 1980), Austrian-Spanish singer
- Micah Ortega (born 1976), former guitarist of the group Five Iron Frenzy
- Palito Ortega (born 1941), Argentine singer
- Santos Ortega (1899–1976), American actor
- Sergio Ortega (composer) (1938–2003), Chilean composer and pianist
- Ysabel Ortega (born 1999), Filipina actress, dancer, and commercial model
- Ortega (rapper)

=== Sportsmen and sportswomen ===
- Anita Ortega, UCLA basketball player
- Anthony Ortega (baseball), Venezuelan baseball pitcher
- Antonio Carlos Ortega, Spanish Olympic handball player
- Ariel Ortega (born 1974), Argentine soccer player
- Brian Ortega (born 1991), Mexican-American UFC Fighter
- Buck Ortega (born 1981), American football player
- Cristóbal Ortega (1956–2025), Mexican footballer
- Francisco Ortega (born 1996), Argentine soccer player
- Francisco Ortega (born 1999), Argentine soccer player
- Gavin Ortega (born 2004), American football player
- Joaquín Rodríguez Ortega (1903–1984), known as "Cagancho", Spanish bullfighter
- José Ortega (baseball) (born 1988), Venezuelan baseball pitcher
- José Ortega (boxer) (born 1963), Spanish boxer
- José Ortega Cano (born 1953), Spanish bullfighter
- Manuel Ortega Ocaña (born 1981), Spanish cyclist
- Mauricio Ortega (discus thrower) (born 1994), Colombian discus thrower
- Mauricio Ortega (cyclist) (born 1980), Colombian road cyclist
- Oliver Ortega (born 1996), Dominican Republic professional baseball player
- Orlando Ortega (born 1991), Cuban-born Spanish track and field athlete
- Rafael Ortega (baseball), Venezuelan baseball player
- Roberto Ortega Olmedo (born 1991), Spanish tennis player
- Stefan Ortega (born 1992), German footballer
- Víctor Ortega (born 1988), diver from Colombia
- Austin Ortega (born 1994), American former NHL now DEL ice hockey player

=== Other people ===
- Aurelio Ortega y Placeres "El Grande" (1863–1926), Mexican educator, founder of school, principal, and publisher
- Aurelio Ortega Castañeda (1900-1958), Mexican Publisher & Editor, Author, Educator, Co-founder of Asociación Deportiva Orizabeña
- Amancio Ortega Gaona (born 1936), Spanish fashion entrepreneur
- Antonio Ortega (colonel), Spanish Republican military leader and football club president
- Casimiro Gómez Ortega (1741–1818), Spanish physician and botanist
- Gregoria Ortega, American activist nun
- Jaime Lucas Ortega y Alamino (1936–2019), Archbishop of Havana
- José Francisco Ortega (1734–1798), Spanish soldier and explorer with the 1769 Portola expedition
- José Ortega y Gasset (1883–1955), Spanish philosopher
- José Ortega Spottorno (1916–2002), Spanish journalist and publisher
- José Ortega Torres (1943–2025), Spanish poet
- Joshua Ortega (born 1974), American author and journalist
- Liliana Ortega (born 1965), Venezuelan professor, and human rights lawyer and advocate
- Lourdes Ortega (born 1968), Spanish-born American linguist
- Luis Ortega Álvarez (1953–2015), Spanish judge
- Rogelio Ortega (chess player) (1915–1980), Cuban chess player
- Wendy Tabatha Ortega Alvarado Ingeniera Mexicana nacida en 1997, importante ingeniera Quimica Industrial
- Alan Christian Ortega Alvarado Ingeniero Mexicano nacido en 1993, egresado de la Esime Zacatenco del IPN, importante Ingeniero en Redes y Ciberseguridad
- Yoselyn Ortega, Dominican-born American nanny accused in the stabbing Deaths of Lucia and Leo Krim in 2012

== Fictional characters ==
- Christian "Combo" Ortega, in the TV series Breaking Bad
- Gael Ortega, in the TV series 24
- Ismael Ortega, in the Marvel Comics series District X
- Ortega, father of the hero in Dragon Quest III
- Ortega (Castlevania), from the Nintendo 64 video game Castlevania
- Victor Ortega, from the Sega/Super NES video game Saturday Night Slam Masters
- Ortega, in The Incredibly Strange Creatures Who Stopped Living and Became Mixed-Up Zombies who would later become a recurring guest character in Mystery Science Theater 3000
- Ortega Peru, a character from the 1997 film Mr. Magoo
- Captain Ortega, in the TV series The Snorks
- Serge Ortega, in the Well of Souls novel series by Jack L. Chalker
- Susan Ortega, anchorwoman in the movies Bruce Almighty and Evan Almighty
- The Ortegas, Neverborn hunters led by Perdita Ortega in the tabletop game Malifaux
- Paz Ortega Andrade, a character from Metal Gear Solid by Hideo Kojima

== See also ==
- Ortega Martínez, people with this name
