= 2025 La Union local elections =

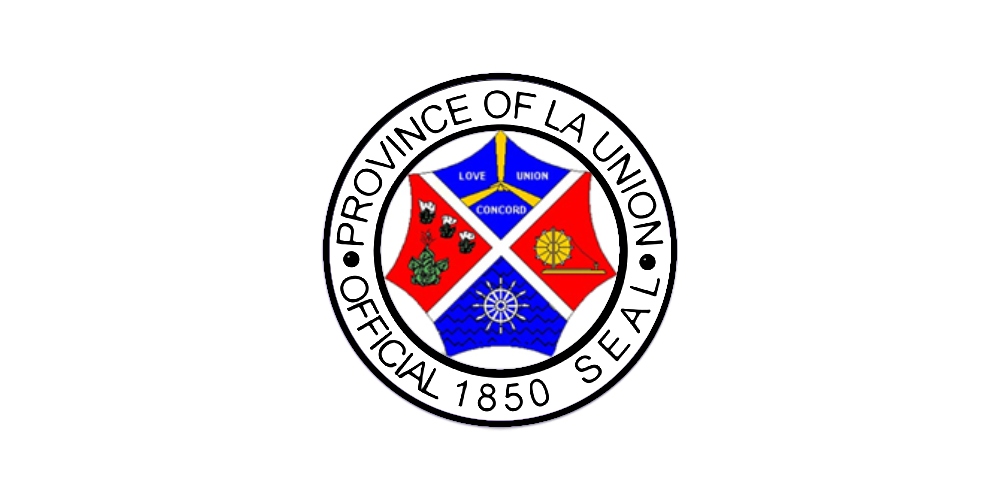
- May 12, 2025
- Gubernatorial election
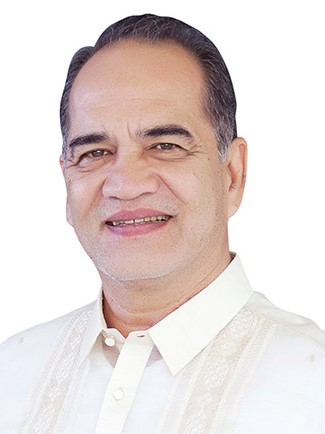

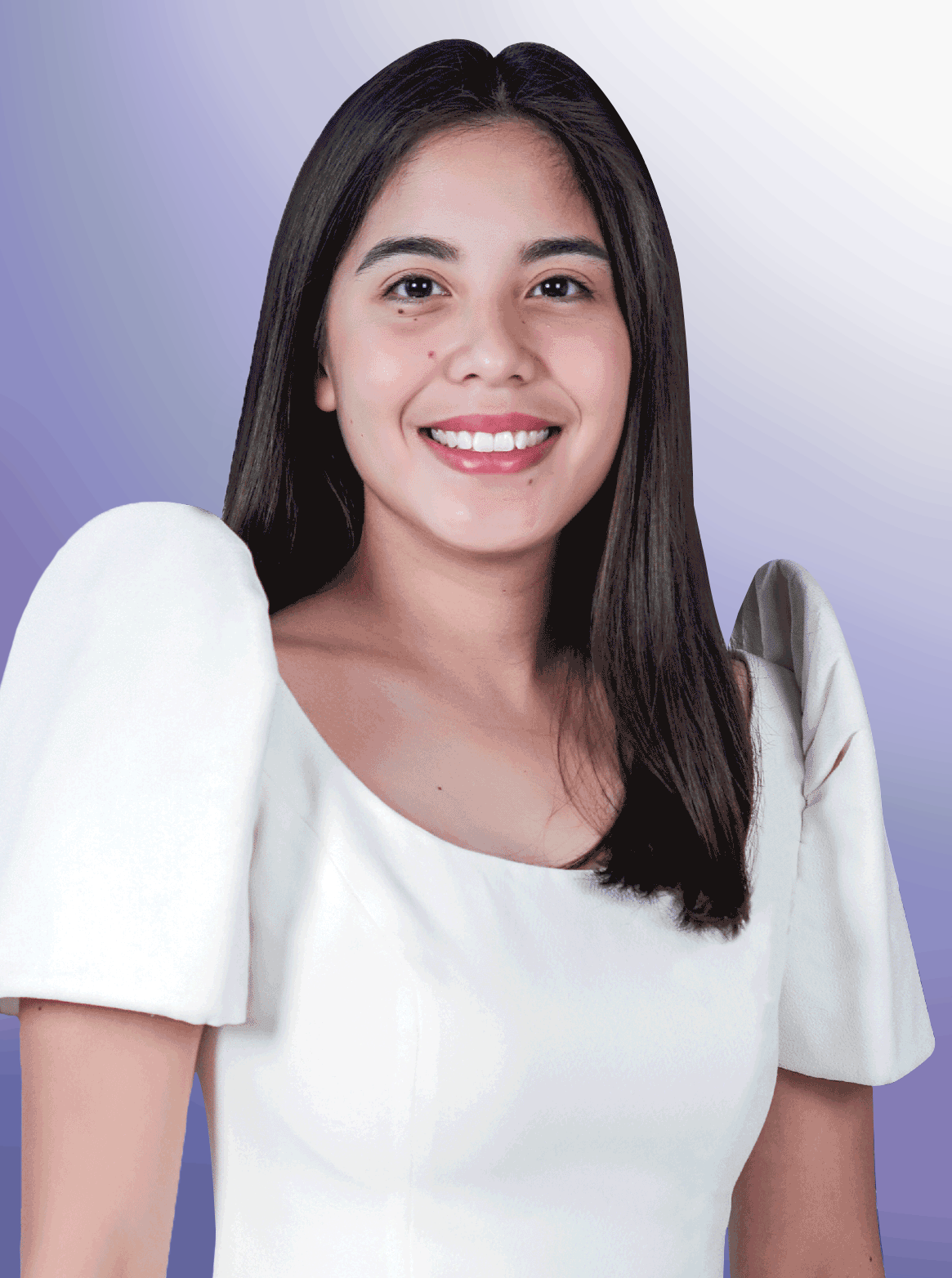
Candidate	Mario Eduardo Ortega	Raphaelle Ortega-David
Party	PFP	NPC
Running mate	Eric Sibuma	Thomas Dumpit Jr.
Incumbent Governor
Raphaelle Ortega-David
NPC
- Vice gubernatorial election
	NPC	Lakas
Candidate	Thomas Dumpit Jr.	Eric Sibuma
Party	NPC	Lakas
Incumbent Vice Governor
Mario Eduardo Ortega
PFP
- Provincial Board election
- 10 out of 13 seats in the La Union Provincial Board; 7 seats needed for a majority
Party	Current seats
Lakas	5
NPC	2
Liberal	1
Nacionalista	1
PDP	1

Local elections were held in La Union on May 12, 2025, as part of the 2025 Philippine general election. La Union voters will elect a governor, a vice governor, and 10 out of 13 members of the La Union Provincial Board.

== Governor ==
Incumbent Raphaelle Ortega-David (Nationalist People's Coalition) is running for a second term. Ortega-David was elected under Pederalismo ng Dugong Dakilang Samahan with 89.72% of the vote in 2022.

=== Candidates ===
The following are the candidates who are included in the ballot:

No.	Candidate	Party
1	Manny Fonseca	Independent
2	Mario Eduardo Ortega	Partido Federal ng Pilipinas
3	Raphaelle Ortega-David (incumbent)	Nationalist People's Coalition
4	Paco Santiago	Independent

=== Results ===
Candidate	Party	Votes	%
Mario Eduardo Ortega	Partido Federal ng Pilipinas	273,671	60.02
Raphaelle Ortega-David	Nationalist People's Coalition	178,168	39.08
Manny Fonseca	Independent	2,511	0.55
Paco Santiago	Independent	1,588	0.35
Total		455,938	100.00

== Vice governor ==
Incumbent Mario Eduardo Ortega (Partido Federal ng Pilipinas) is running for governor of La Union. Ortega was elected as an independent unopposed in 2022.

=== Candidates ===
The following are the candidates who are included in the ballot:

No.	Candidate	Party
1	Thomas Dumpit Jr.	Nationalist People's Coalition
2	Eric Sibuma	Lakas–CMD

=== Results ===
Candidate	Party	Votes	%
Eric Sibuma	Lakas–CMD	283,612	67.77
Thomas Dumpit Jr.	Nationalist People's Coalition	134,852	32.23
Total		418,464	100.00

== Provincial Board ==
The La Union Provincial Board is composed of 13 board members, 10 of whom are elected.

=== Retiring and term-limited board members ===
The following board members are retiring:

- Joy Ortega (Nacionalista Party, 1st District), running for the House of Representatives in La Union's 1st legislative district
- Rachel Pinzon (Lakas–CMD, 1st District)
- Bronson Rivera (Partido Demokratiko Pilipino, 2nd District)

The following board members are term-limited:

- Annabelle de Guzman (Nationalist People's Coalition, 2nd District)

=== Overview ===
Party	Votes	%	Seats
Lakas–CMD	1,167,816	68.20	8
Nationalist People's Coalition	278,042	16.24	0
Liberal Party	50,944	2.98	0
Independent	215,575	12.59	2
Ex officio seats			3
Reserved seats			1
Total	1,712,377	100.00	14

=== 1st Provincial District ===
La Union's 1st provincial district consists of the same area as La Union's 1st legislative district. Five board members are elected from this provincial district.

==== Candidates ====
The following are the candidates who are included in the ballot:

No.	Candidate	Party
1	Ren Bumatay	Independent
2	Nikko Fontanilla	Lakas–CMD
3	Migz Magsaysay	Independent
4	Jen Mosuela-Fernandez (incumbent)	Lakas–CMD
5	Chary Nisce (incumbent)	Lakas–CMD
6	Jay Jay Orros	Nationalist People's Coalition
7	Denny Ortega	Independent
8	Gerard Ostrea (incumbent)	Lakas–CMD
9	Aaron Kyle Pinzon	Lakas–CMD
10	Ernesto Rafon	Independent

==== Results ====
Candidate	Party	Votes	%
Chary Nisce (incumbent)	Lakas–CMD	117,851	17.20
Migz Magsaysay	Independent	101,442	14.80
Gerard Ostrea (incumbent)	Lakas–CMD	81,359	11.87
Aaron Kyle Pinzon	Lakas–CMD	79,695	11.63
Ernesto Rafon	Independent	75,468	11.01
Jen Mosuela-Fernandez (incumbent)	Lakas–CMD	68,966	10.06
Nikko Fontanilla	Lakas–CMD	67,984	9.92
Jay Jay Orros	Nationalist People's Coalition	53,887	7.86
Denny Ortega	Independent	33,725	4.92
Ren Bumatay	Independent	4,940	0.72
Total		685,317	100.00

=== 2nd Provincial District ===
La Union's 2nd provincial district consists of the same area as La Union's 2nd legislative district. Five board members are elected from this provincial district.

==== Candidates ====
The following are the candidates who are included in the ballot:

No.	Candidate	Party
1	Cynthia Bacurnay (incumbent)	Liberal Party
2	Henry Balbin (incumbent)	Nationalist People's Coalition
3	Martin de Guzman	Lakas–CMD
4	Gina Estepa-Flores	Nationalist People's Coalition
5	Jeferson Fernando	Lakas–CMD
6	Tess Garcia	Lakas–CMD
7	Alberto Nidoy	Nationalist People's Coalition
8	Ruperto Rillera Jr. (incumbent)	Lakas–CMD
9	Christian Rivera	Nationalist People's Coalition
10	Alyssa Kristine Sibuma	Lakas–CMD

==== Results ====
Candidate	Party	Votes	%
Alyssa Kristine Sibuma	Lakas–CMD	164,075	15.98
Tess Garcia	Lakas–CMD	161,248	15.70
Martin de Guzman	Lakas–CMD	154,138	15.01
Ruperto Rillera Jr. (incumbent)	Lakas–CMD	141,677	13.79
Jeferson Fernando	Lakas–CMD	130,823	12.74
Henry Balbin (incumbent)	Nationalist People's Coalition	78,343	7.63
Christian Rivera	Nationalist People's Coalition	68,683	6.69
Cynthia Bacurnay (incumbent)	Liberal Party	50,944	4.96
Gina Estepa-Flores	Nationalist People's Coalition	44,575	4.34
Alberto Nidoy	Nationalist People's Coalition	32,554	3.17
Total		1,027,060	100.00
