= House of Carrillo =

Spanish noble house

Coat of arms of Cardinal Alonso Carrillo

The House of Carrillo is a Spanish noble house that traces its origins from the ancient Kingdom of Castile. There are several branches that exist such as Carrillo de Albornoz, Carrillo de Mendoza, Carrillo de Figueroa, Carrillo de Toledo and Carrillo Tablas among others. There are also several variations in spelling of the surname Carrillo such as "Carillo" or "Sciarrillo". Records prove that both surnames are one and the same.

== History ==
=== Name origins ===
Carrillo is a Spanish surname. References to the origins of the name dates back to the Kingdom of Castile in the thirteenth century. According to a legend of family origin, two brothers of royalty (their country of origin is unknown; but, it is presumed to have been France) were on a tour visiting foreign lands. Misfortune came upon the brothers when they accidentally killed a courtier of the King of Italy. The brothers had to flee into hiding to avoid the king's rage (it is said that the brothers dueled with the courtier over the honor of a beautiful Spanish maiden). The brothers fled to Spain, and were placed under the protection of The Count of Castile Fernán González of Castile. Legend states that the brothers were strongly loyal to one another, and always traveled together. They were happy in demeanor, and good in nature. Once accepted into Spanish society, the brothers were so grateful that they devoted themselves to a stronger religious and spiritual commitment among themselves, and became very patriotic. The brothers devoted themselves to serve their new country and they pledged their loyalty to the Monarchy of Spain. It is said that when seen together, many would describe the brothers very much like "los carillones de la iglesia" (the carillon bells of a church) as they were always together, and drew bright attention to themselves due to their devoted works, and outspoken dedication to the Crown and Church. Because the brothers' language of origin gave them distinct accents, they called themselves Carrillo (a compromised version of "carillon", and one more easily accommodated by the Spanish language). The brothers endeared themselves to the Castilians, and married two daughters of a noble Count. The count of Castile made it possible to ennoble the brothers and attain the titles of Count of Priego for the elder brother, and Marquis De La Guardia for the younger. All lines of the Carrillo family are said to branch from these two brothers. The name Carrillo also appears in connection with an ancient Spanish legend concerning the Siete Infantes de Lara (Seven Princes of Lara). Through time, the name Carrillo has been subject to several false etymologies and irrelevant definitions, but the legendary story has roots in anecdotal evidence and tradition. The meaning of the surname Carrillo is derived from both definitions of "carillones" in Spanish and "carrillon" in French.

The surname "Carrillo" is first found in Castile, Spain, in Burgos, Palencia, Soria, Logroño, Navarre, and Andalucia. Family members later went off to help in the conquest and establishment of colonies outside Spain, and included Cuba, Puerto Rico, Mexico, Venezuela, Costa Rica, Colombia, Chile, Philippines, Argentina, and the United States of America, particularly California.

== Influence and service ==
The House of Carrillo frequently served the government through holding many offices and providing military leaders for Spain. Since the reign of Alfonso X the Wise, the office of "Alcalde Mayor de los Hidalgos de Castilla" has been in the Carrillo lineage. This palatine position of justice sentenced exclusively in the lawsuits of nobility and in matters related to the nobility of the litigants. Effective throughout the Middle Ages, until the remodeling of the Chancilleries carried out by the Catholic Monarchs; from 1572 it became a merely honorary position. The House of Carrillo has also produced three Catholic Cardinals, Cardinal Alonso de Carrillo Laso, Cardinal Alonso Carrillo de Albornoz and Cardinal Gil Alvarez Carrillo de Albornoz.

The most famous military leader produced by the House of Carrillo is José Carrillo de Albornoz, 1st Duke of Montemar who was Viceroy of Sicily. He victoriously lead the Spanish forces at the Battle of Bitonto.

== Prominent members ==
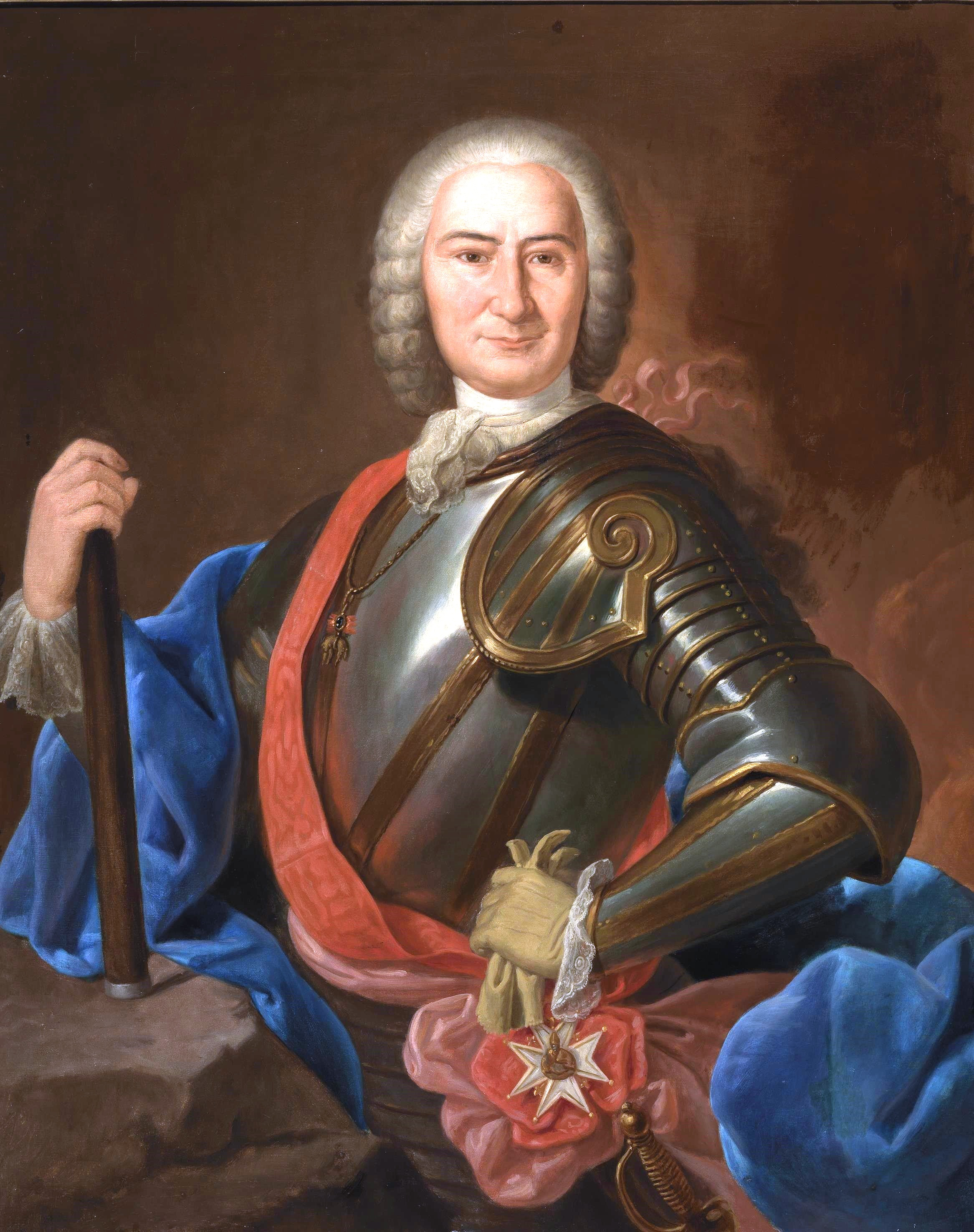
Duke Jose Carrillo de Albornoz of Montemar

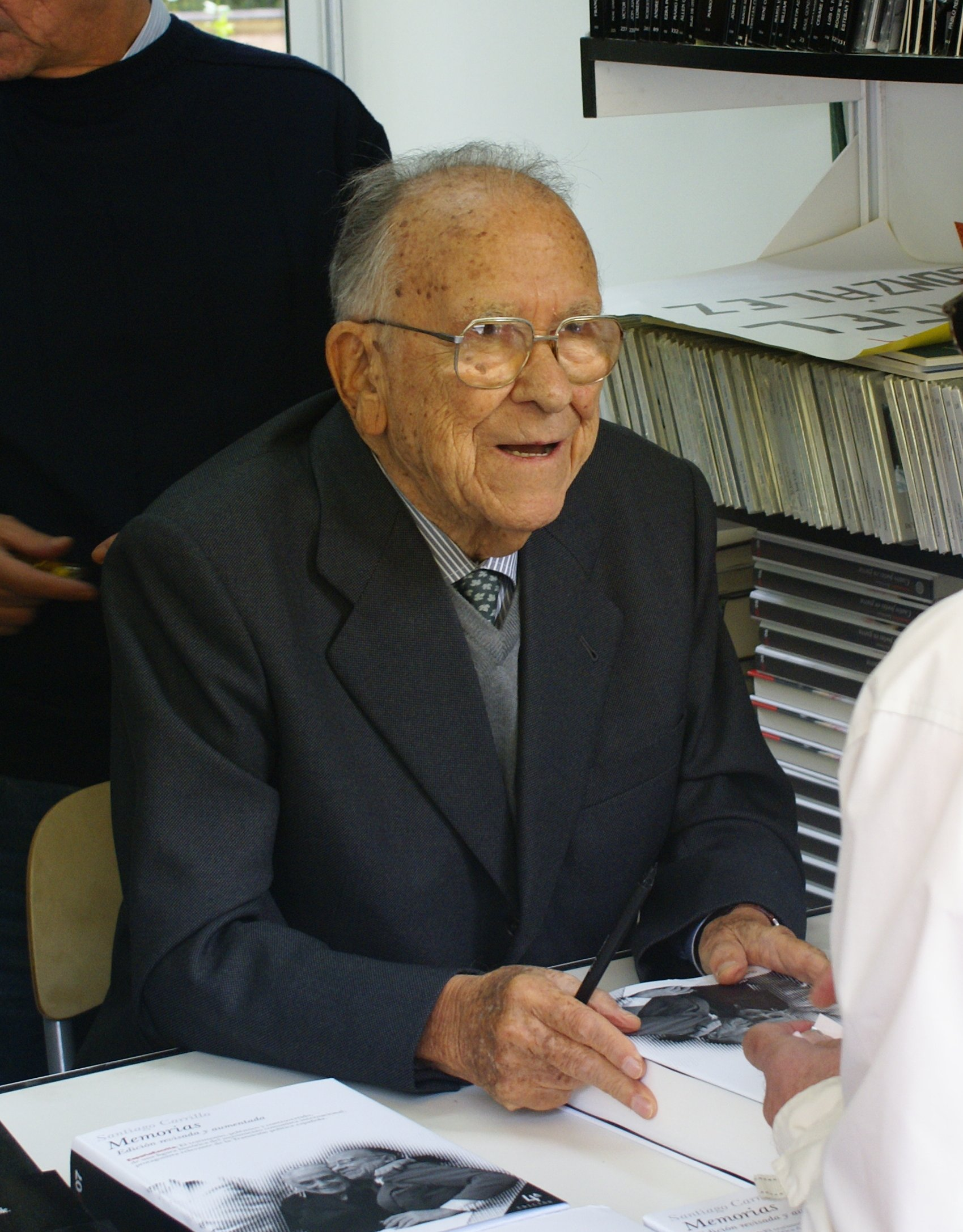
Santiago Carrillo

Below are some of the members and descendants of the House of Carrillo:

- Emperor Agustin I of Mexico, of the House of Iturbide; his mother was a member of the cadet branch of the House of Carrillo, Carrillo de Figueroa.
- Juan Alfonso Carrillo, 2nd Count of Priego, son of Alfonso Ruiz Carrillo, 1st Count of Priego, son of Garci Gómez Carrillo, Lord of Mazuelo, and of Urraca Alonso, daughter of Prince Alfonso de Molina, son of King Alfonso IX of León and his second wife Queen Berengaria of Castile.
- Hernan Venegas Carrillo was a Spanish conquistador who participated in the Spanish conquest of the Muisca and Panche people in the New Kingdom of Granada, present-day Colombia. Venegas Carrillo was mayor of Santa Fe de Bogotá two terms; in 1542 and from 1543 to 1544.
- Queen Fabiola of Belgium, Queen of the Belgians as the wife of King Baudouin I of Belgium, daughter of Blanca de Aragón y Carrillo de Albornoz.
- Duke José Carrillo de Albornoz, 1st Duke of Montemar, victorious commander of the Spanish forces in the Battle of Bitonto and was made Duke of Montemar by King Philip V of Spain on April 20, 1735.
- Duke García Álvarez de Toledo, 1st Duke of Alba, Spanish nobleman, military leader and politician, son of Mencia Carrillo, Lady of Bercimuelle
- Count Fernando Carrillo de Mendoza, Juan de Austria's Mayordomo mayor, and from 1570, with the death of his father, Felipe II's chief falconer. Previously, he had been ambassador to Portugal. In 1570 he was appointed assistant and captain general of Seville.
- Marquis Luis de Benavides Carrillo, Marquis of Caracena, Governor of the Habsburg Netherlands (1659 and 1664), Governor of Milan, Spanish general and political figure.
- Marquis Diego Carrillo de Mendoza y Pimentel de Gelves, Viceroy of New Spain (Mexico)
- Marquis Alfonso de la Cueva, 1st Marquis of Bedmar, Spanish diplomat, bishop and Roman cardinal.
- Marquis Gastón de Peralta, 3rd Marquis of Falces, Spanish nobleman who was viceroy of New Spain
- Count José Baquíjano of Vista Florida, Spanish/Peruvian economist and jurist, writer and politician, and one of the first great intellectuals of the Viceroyalty of Peru.
- Don Luis Carrillo y Sotomayor, Knight of Santiago, Commander of the Spanish galleons and renowned Spanish poet
- Cardinal Gil Alvarez Carrillo de Albornoz, (1310–1367), Spanish cardinal and Papal military leader
- Cardinal Gil de Albornoz, (1579-1649), Spanish Catholic Cardinal, Governor of the Duchy of Milan
- Archbishop Alfonso Carillo de Acuña, Spanish politician and Roman Catholic archbishop.
- Leonor López de Córdoba wrote what is supposed to be the first autobiography in Castilian, after being banished from the Castilian Court where she was an advisor and confidant of Queen Catalina of Lancaster, wife of King Henry III. She was born at the home of Pedro I of Castile and spent her childhood at the court, along with her mother, Sancha Carrillo, who was Pedro's kinswoman and Alfonso XI's niece.
- Count Pedro Carrillo de Mendoza, Captain General of Seville and Mayordomo mayor of Queen Margarita of Austria
- Braulio Carrillo Colina, President (1835) and Dictator (1838–1842) of Costa Rica.
- Francisco Solano López Carrillo, President of Paraguay (1862-1870)
- Leo Carrillo (Leopoldo Antonio Carrillo) was a famous American actor, vaudevillian, political cartoonist, and conservationist in the 1950s era. Leo Carrillo State Park in Los Angeles County is dedicated to his memory.
- Lieutenant General Antonio Ricardos Carrillo de Albornoz, fought against Habsburg Austria, the Portugal, and the First French Republic during a long military career. He invaded Rousillon where he won a series of victories over the French. After his death in early 1794, the war went badly for Spain.
- Captain José Antonio Carrillo, Mayor of Los Angeles in 1826, 1828, and 1833.
- Don Manuel Carrillo Tablas, Mayor of Orizaba, Veracruz (1866–1867, 1871,1877, 1892-1894 & 1899-1900) and philanthropist of the city donating the lands of the present Cathedral of Orizaba, together with the main market and other properties, and funded in large measure the Palace of Iron brought from Belgium and designed by Eiffel. Spanish noble arriving in Orizaba via Cuba.
- Don Manuel Carrillo Iturriaga, Philanthropist and Mexican congressman.
- Wenceslao Carrillo, prominent Spanish Socialist leader and Minister of the Interior of Spain.
- Santiago Carrillo, Secretary-General of the Communist Party of Spain, member of the Congress of Deputies, leader of the democratic opposition to the dictatorship of Francisco Franco, leading founder of Eurocommunism and a key figure in Spain's transition to democracy.
- Pedro Carrillo de Huete, Lord of Priego and Grand Falconer of John II of Aragon
- Julián Carrillo Trujillo, Mexican classical composer, conductor of the American Symphony Orchestra in New York, violinist and musical theorist of the "13th Sound"
- Antonio Carrillo Flores, Mexican statesman awarded by more than 23 governments and institutions, Minister of Finance and Minister of Foreign Affairs of Mexico, Ambassador of Mexico to the United States and to the Soviet Union.
- Nabor Carrillo Flores, acclaimed Mexican nuclear physicist; the lunar crater of "Carrillo" is named after him.
- Maestro Armando Ortega Carrillo, renowned Mexican poet, tenor, composer and conductor. Great grandson of Don Manuel Carrillo Tablas.
- Francisco Carrillo Morales, Mayor General (Mambi) of Ejercito Libertador. During the República he has different political positions: he was senator for Las Villas from 1902 to 1910; Provincial Governor of Las Villas from 1913 to 1918, and Vice President of the Republic from 1921 to 1925, when Alfredo Zayas was elected as president.
- Eduardo Carrillo de Albornoz, Director of Strategy and Business Development, Boeing Research & Technology Europe.
- José Miguel Carrillo de Albornoz, prominent Spanish writer.
- Enrique Gómez Carrillo, famous and prominent Guatemalan writer known as "El príncipe de los Cronistas".
- Salomón Carrillo Ramírez, very well known and respected writer from Jutiapa, Guatemala.
- Gregorio Carrillo y Escudero, Presidente de la Real Audiencia del Reino de Guatemala en el año 1700 durante el Virreinato de la Nueva España.
- Miguel Carrillo de Albornoz y Archer, Alférez Real y Corregidor de Chiquimula de la Sierra y Quetzaltenango en la Capitanía General de Guatemala.
- Vicente de Aycinena y Carrillo, II marqués de Aycinena. Guatemala.
- Mariano Josef Ygnacio Carrillo de Albornoz y Archer. Brigadier y Capitán General de Yucatán. Caballero de Calatrava y de la orden america a de Isabel La Católica.
