= List of vice governors of La Union =

Vice Governor of La Union
- Incumbent; Eric O. Sibuma since June 30, 2025
- Seat: La Union Provincial Capitol
- Nominator: Political party
- Term length: 3 years Up to three terms

The Vice Governor of La Union (Filipino: Pangalawang Punong Lalawigan ng La Union) is the presiding officer of the Sangguniang Panlalawigan, the legislature of the provincial government of La Union, Philippines.

The current vice governor is Eric Sibuma, in office since 2025.

== List of Vice Governors ==
No.	Image	Vice Governor	Term
1		Pedro G. Peralta	1960-1963
2		Francisco F. Gurtina	1964-1967
3		Roman R. Vilalon Jr.	1968-1975
4		Victor F. Ortega	1980-1986
5		Norman D. Zandueta	1986-1988
6		Juan V. Komiya	1988
7		Aida M. Aspiras	1988-1992
8		Amparo M. Aspiras	1992-1998
9		Aureo Augusto Q. Nisce	1998-2007
10		Eulogio Clarence Martin P. de Guzman	2007-2010
(9)		Aureo Augusto Q. Nisce	2010-2019
11		Mario Eduardo C. Ortega	2019-2025
12		Eric Sibuma	2025-present

== See also ==
- Governor of La Union
