= Manuel Ortega =

Manuel Ortega may refer to:

- Manuel Ortega (singer) (born 1980), Austrian singer
- Manuel Ortega (painter) (1921–2014), Spanish painter
- Manuel Ortega Ocaña (born 1981), Spanish cyclist
- Manuel Ortega, Emberá, corregimiento in Panama

== See also ==
- Emanuel Ortega, Argentine pop singer
