= Iturriaga =

Iturriaga is a Spanish surname. People with this name include:

- Eneritz Iturriaga, a Spanish former racing cyclist
- Enrique Iturriaga (1918-2019), Peruvian composer
- Felipe Iturriaga, a Chilean farmer and politician
- Javier Iturriaga, a Spanish footballer
- Juan Manuel López Iturriaga, a Spanish retired professional basketball player
- Manuel Carrillo Iturriaga, a philanthropist and Mexican politician
- Raúl Iturriaga, a Chilean Army general
