= Manuel Carrillo Tablas =

Mexican politician

Don Manuel Carrillo de Albornoz y Tablas
- Born: 1822; Cuba
- Died: December 31, 1899 (aged 77); Orizaba, Veracruz, Mexico
- Spouse: María Rosa Guadalupe del Corazón de Jesús Iturriaga Gambino Gámez
- Children: Manuel Carrillo Iturriaga, Angel Tiburcio Carrillo Iturriaga, Dolores Carrillo Iturriaga, Isabel Carrillo Iturriaga y Rosa Ricarda Carrillo Iturriaga.
- Parent(s): José Manuel Carrillo de Albornoz and María Inés Tablas

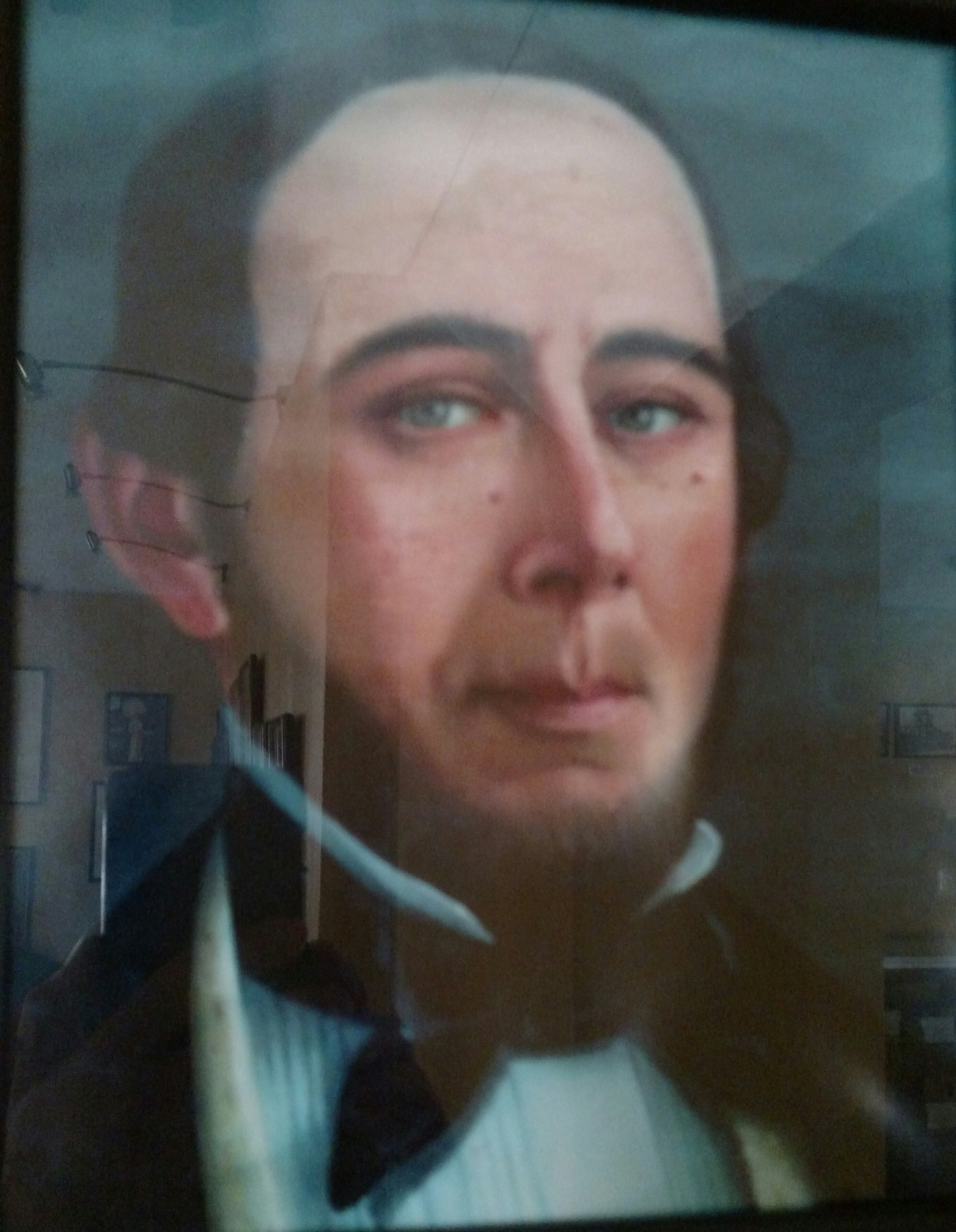
Image of Don Manuel Carrillo Tablas found at the AMO museum (Archivo Municipal of Orizaba).

Manuel Carrillo de Albornoz y Tablas (1822 – 31 December 1899) was a Mexican philanthropist and served as mayor of Orizaba, Veracruz, Mexico. He was a descendant from the Carrillo family, a Spanish noble house. He served as the mayor several times (1866–1867, 1871-1871, 1877-1877, 1892–1894, and 1899–1900).

== Early life ==
Don Manuel Carrillo Tablas was born into one of the Grandes families of Spain. He was born in Cuba en route to Mexico, but was registered as born in Cordoba to Don José Manuel Carrillo de Albornoz and Doña María Inés Tablas who traveled from Spain through Cuba to New Spain (Mexico). In 1859 he married Rosa Iturriaga Gambino, the daughter of merchant, Don Leandro Antonio Iturriaga Morillas and Doña Micaela Gambino Gámez from Orizaba, Veracruz, Mexico where he would establish a new dynasty and make his own fortune.

== Career ==
Don Manuel Carrillo de Albornoz y Tablas managed to acquire more than half the properties in the city of Orizaba, Veracruz. He had two ranches (Palas y San Isidro en Ixhuatlancillo) both which extended from the borders of the city (Cerritos) to the base of the Pico de Orizaba. He also had lands in Córdoba and Puebla. He was a very charitable man, who during his life funded in large measure the building and transportation of the famous Palacio de Hierro (Iron Palace) designed by Societé Anonymé des Forges D'Aiseau, Bélgica (Belgium) and which served as Orizaba's City Hall for most of the 20th century. The initial loan he made to the city for the project (60 thousand pesos in silver - the equivalent of 180,000 U.S. Dollars at the time) was never repaid due to his untimely death at the turn of the century; neither was the loan he made to transport the palace from the shipyard to its present location. He also donated the Casa de la Manzana de Bendriñana to extend "Parque Castillo" and the land for the main market "Mercado Melchor Ocampo.".

Don Manuel helped to contribute to Orizaba's recognition as a major city in the Province. When Emperor Maximilian I of Mexico and Empress Carlota visited the city for the first time in 1864 with much pomp, the emperor and empress stayed in the house of Don Manuel Carrillo Tablas known as "La Estrella" and later as "La Eureka". He had another mansion where Don Francisco y Madero stayed as a guest as well.

After the fall of the second Mexican Empire, Don Manuel was present when the Mexican Republic was reestablished in Orizaba. He then sought to make Orizaba a city of culture and progress both as Mayor and as a prominent resident. In 1892 Orizaba boasted being the city that housed 10 of the countries 665 newspapers. During the time of the Presidency of Porfirio Diaz, Orizaba was considered the most educated city in the Mexican Province.

== Death ==
On New Year's Eve 1899 Don Manuel Carrillo Tablas died. His son Don Manuel Carrillo Iturriaga (born in 1868 and who would serve as Political Chief of the Canton of Orizaba during the early 1900s), would take up the helm as the head of the family. Don Manuel Carrillo Iturriaga married Doña María Limón (from San Luis Potosí) and both lived in Orizaba, Veracruz. Don Manuel Carrillo Iturriaga would also serve in the Mexican Congress as a Diputado during the rewriting of the Mexican Constitution in 1917.

Because Don Manuel died without a will, the government of Mexico seized most of his possessions, leaving his children to battle the courts to retain what they could of their father's vast wealth. At the time of Don Manuel Carrillo Tablas' death, families of status and wealth were buried in private lots on their ranch. Looters disturbed the remains of Don Manuel searching for jewels and left the remains unburied. His son, Don Manuel Carrillo Iturriaga, brought the remains to his family's hacienda known as "El Molino de la Alianza". Upon the death of Don Manuel Carrillo Iturriaga, his daughter Doña Guadalupe Carrillo viuda de Ortega buried both her father and grandfather in the city's cemetery, in the family plot. The renowned musician and Maestro Armando Ortega is also buried in the same family plot.
