= Manuel Carrillo Iturriaga =

Don Manuel Carrillo Iturriaga
- Born: 1868; Orizaba, Veracruz, Mexico
- Died: December 25, 1942 (aged 73–74); Orizaba, Veracruz, Mexico
- Spouse: Doña Guadalupe Limón
- Children: Sara Carrillo Blackborne, María Elena Carrillo Blackborne, Carlos Manuel Carrillo Limón, Armando Carrillo Limón, Roberto Carrillo Limón, Guadalupe María Macaria Carrillo Limón, Salvador Carrillo Limón, and Alicia Carrillo Limón.
- Parent(s): Don Manuel Carrillo Tablas and Doña Rosa Iturriaga Gambino

Don Manuel Carrillo Iturriaga (1868–1942) was a philanthropist and Mexican politician. He was a descendant from the Carrillo family, a Spanish noble house. He served in the Mexican Congress during the writing of the new Mexican constitution in 1917.

== Early life ==
Don Manuel Carrillo Iturriaga was born into one of the Grandes families of Spain. The son of Don Manuel Carrillo Tablas and Doña Rosa Iturriaga Gambino from Orizaba, Veracruz. Don Manuel Carrillo Iturriaga was born in Orizaba, Veracruz in 1868. He would go on to marry the love of his life Doña Guadalupe Limón (from San Luis Potosí).

== Career ==
Don Manuel Carrillo Iturriaga became the patriarch of the family upon the sudden death of his father at the turn of the century. Because his father did not leave a will, he would find the next years difficult, battling in probate the Mexican government for his father's estate. The young Manuel would go on to serve as Political Chief of the Canton of Orizaba during the early 1900s. Later he would advance in his political career serving as a Diputado of the 12th electoral district of the State of Veracruz in the Mexican Congress during the rewriting of the Mexican Constitution in 1917.

== Death ==
Upon the death of Don Manuel Carrillo Iturriaga, his daughter Doña Guadalupe María Macaria Carrillo viuda de Ortega transferred the remains of both her father and grandfather from the family Hacienda "El Molino de la Alianza" to what is now the family plot in the city's cemetery (Zona 1, Sección 6, Fila 31, Fosa 13). Doña Guadalupe Carrillo de Ortega, the daughter of Don Manuel Iturriaga is buried adjacent to her father and grandfather's tomb. The renown musician and grandson of Don Manuel Carrillo Iturriaga Maestro Armando Ortega Carrillo is buried in the same cemetery tomb as his mother (Zona 1, Sección 6, Fila 32, fosa 12) Doña Guadalupe Carrillo de Ortega husband, Don Aurelio Ortega Castañeda, the father of Maestro Armando Ortega is buried with his son Hector Efrain Ortega Carrillo in the city cemetery nearby (Zona 1, Sección 6, Fila 12, Fosa 12). Don Manual Carrillo Iturriaga's son, Don Armando Carrillo Limón, would go on to be a prominent physician in Mexico. Don Manuel Carrillo Iturriaga's granddaughter, Doña Alicia María Guadalupe Ortega Carrillo de Arenas, OSCD, died on the feast of St. Teresa's Transverberation (August 26, 2021) in Cordoba, Veracruz. Her remains were then transported to Los Angeles, California, to be buried in Calvary Cemetery, with her eldest son, Erick Gilberto Arenas Ortega.
