= Aurelio Ortega Castañeda =

Don Aurelio Ortega Castaneda
- Born: May 7, 1900; Orizaba, Veracruz, Mexico
- Died: January 11, 1958 (aged 57); Orizaba, Veracruz, Mexico
- Spouse: Guadalupe María Micala Carrillo Limón
- Children: Armando Manuel Aurelio Ortega Carrillo, Hector Efraín Ortega Carrillo and Alicia María Guadalupe Ortega Carrillo de Arenas, OSCD
- Parent(s): Aurelio Ortega y Placeres and María Castañeda

Aurelio Ortega Castañeda (7 May 1900), known as Don Aurelio Ortega Castañeda, son of Aurelio Ortega y Placeres, was the editor of the famous magazine at the time La Calandria and of other works such as Panorama Orizabeño Almas Provincianas (1938); Nuestra Señora de los Puentes (1943); Pluviosilla Señorial y Legendaria (1955); among others like: "Anécdotas y otros cuentos"; "Orizaba (álbum gráfico descriptivo)"; "Almas Provincianas y Crepúsculo y Senderos de Historia (obras inéditas)". He is the father of the renowned Mexican musician and artist Armando Ortega.

== Early life ==
Aurelio Ortega Castañeda was the third son of Aurelio Ortega y Placeres, and just like his father before him was a brilliant, very cultured educated and generous man. He was born on 7 May 1900 in Orizaba, Veracruz. He attended his father's primary school and in a short time learned to read and write well, in addition to learning the art of typography. His father had a printing shop known as El Lápiz Rojo (The Red Pencil) for the elaboration of didactic materials. In 1907 at the age of six, along with his older brothers Domingo and Efraín, and younger brother Raúl, redacted and printed the children's newspaper titled, "El Salvador de la Infancia" (The Savior of Childhood). Likewise, they collaborate in the formatting and printing of the newspaper owned by their father, titled " Nuevas Ideas" (New Ideas). With the assassination of President Francisco I. Madero in 1911, and the revolution to follow, Aurelio's father was obligated to close the academic schools he directed as well as the school of arts & crafts, both located on Calle Real (Main Street). Later on, with the death of Don Rafael Delgado y Sáinz in 1914, of whom he was a student, almost cut short his cultural formation. His father's extensive library collection led to young Aurelio becoming a self-taught and very cultured individual with knowledge about a great many subjects. His knowledge and talents were often hidden from others as he become shy and reserved during his youth. As 1916 came to a close, follow the death of his much admired mentor, Rafael Delgado, he joined a group of athletes to found the Asociación Deportiva Orizabeña (Orizaba Athletic Association). In 1925 he would go on to establish the first sports newspaper in the country aptly titled Deportes (Sports), which would run until 1930.

== Adult career ==
In 1932 Don Aurelio Ortega Castañeda turned his attention to the publication of the weekly newspaper "El Boletín de la ADO" (The ADO Bulletin), which ran until 1936. That same year he would publish his first book titled "Panoramas Orizabeños." Then in 1938 he would publish his second book, "Alma Provinciana: Cosas de mi Tierra," which received recognition and acclaim among literary circles and critics in the capital of the Republic. In the same year, Don Aurelio would publish another weekly "Adeoína" which ran for a year as the catalyst for launching his national renown magazine "La Calandria," copies of which are housed in the Archivo Municipal de Orizaba. Prior to the magazine's publication in 1939, he published another work of art titled "Orizaba: Album Gráfico Descriptivo." This lavishly illustrated book with descriptions of historical and recreational sites and places is also well received by critics. La Calandria began its circulation in 1940 and was considered the best magazine published outside of the nation's capital. It was known for its excellent presentation and magnificent content which paraded the best of the national intelligentsia. Don Aurelio would publish two excellent essays during this time, "La Imprenta y el Periodismo en el Estado de Veracruz" and "La Manchester de México." The latter is a study on the strength of the Orizabeña industry and the possibilities that the region offered for the entrepreneur. In that 1943, without neglecting his beloved magazine, he wrote, edited and published the work that was to give him definitive renown as a writer and make his beloved city known by the poetic name with which he baptized it: "Nuestra Señora de los Puentes." The book would receive major public acclaim. Exélsior published the declarations of the Engineer José Luis Osorio Mondragón (Director of the Instituto de Geografía e Historia de la UNAM y author de textos de geografía humana) who referred to the book Nuestra Señora de los Puentes with these words: "This work represents a precious study of human geography, which has no precedent in our country, since it can be compared to the studies of Hanoteaux, when this distinguished author affirms that France is a person!...This work, written with a perfect literary-geographical sense...The Antonio Garcia Cubas Library is pleased to count among its most valuable copies the one entitled, Nuestra Señora de los Puentes." The Casino of the State of Veracruz, A.C., joined the recognitions by offering him a gala dinner, broadcast by Radio XEW, where Don Aurelio was given a scroll that reads: "The Casino of the State of Veracruz, to the Distinguished Veracruz Writer Aurelio Ortega, as a tribute to the warm praise that has been received by the press on the occasion of the publication of his book titled, "Nuestra Señora de los Puentes." The official Speaker at the event was Dr. Salvador Ojeda Ruvira. In 1955 Don Aurelio took to writing "Pluviosilla Señorial y Legendaria," part 2 of Nuestra Señora de los Puentes." The praises of the Mexican intelligentsia did not wait, and among others, the study carried out by the journalist, Writer and Teacher of Journalists, Don Fernando Mota, which among other phrases published in the section "Libros Sobre Mi Mesa," in Excelsior's "Thursdays" Weekly wrote: "...and so with galas of language, lyrical emotion of a poet and erudition of a learned historiographer, toast in this book Pluviosilla Señorial y Legendaria, those trances, events and adventures that form the wealth of legend, romance and tradition, referred to in this case to the Colonial City of Orizaba, whose history of time gone is an affirmation of quality in the present and a guarantee of the future...happy the town that has a singer who perpetuates - in romance or in clean prose - the feats that time is erasing in the clouds of distance...!

It is Don Aurelio Ortega Castañeda who christened Orizaba with the title "Nuestra Señora de los Puentes". In 1944 Don Aurelio was invited by the 3rd National Congress of Librarians and the 1st of Archivist to assist them in the preparations for the celebrations and with a list of distinguished individuals from the State of Veracruz. In the following year he was made an associate of the Centro Veracuzano de Cultura for his contributions to the State and Nation. Don Aurelio, like his father before him, valued public education. When Don Aurelio's friend became Governor of the State of Veracruz in 1944, Don Aurelio kept a friendly and professional correspondence with the future president of the Mexican Republic. In 1946 Don Adolfo Ruiz Cortines sent a letter to Don Aurelio thanking him for his second administrative report. In 1946 author Juan Bartolo Hernández wrote to Don Aurelio to request information to include in his book titled “Escritores Veracruzanos.” During the late 1940s Don Aurelio served as a delegate for the Department of Information, Dissemination and Tourism for the State of Veracruz. On December 1, 1949, Don Aurelio was appointed by the City Council (H. Ayuntamiento Constitucional) of Orizaba as a member of the Pro-Turism Committee of the City because of his "merits and enthusiasm for the City of Orizaba." Don Aurelio was known for his generous nature for which his friend Gilberto Loyo wrote to have him serve as host to Miss Gitta Sten from the Polish embassy in Mexico on her trip to Orizaba. He was also asked to present her to the “distinguished intellectuals of Orizaba.” Don Aurelio continued to contribute to the culture and education of Orizaba of Veracruz and of Mexico. In 1954 he was appointed Cultural Advisor for San Agustin Forum Cultural Center in Orizaba.

Don Aurelio Ortega Castañeda was offered the office of Presidente Municipal of his beloved Pluviosilla, but the only official position he was willing to accept was that of Delegado de Turismo en Orizaba (1947-1957). He was also named Cronista Oficial de la Ciudad, a role he held until his death. On January 11, 1958, at 8 pm, Don Aurelio died, but not before leaving behind two books ready for publication: the first titled, "Senderos de Historia: ¿Sería Orizaba Así?" and "Crespúsculo." His epitaph says it all (printed on the cover of a special issue of La Calandria, dated April 1958, dedicated to his memory and with the pen of his many friends, such as Dr. Ramón Rocha Garfias, Carolina Ojeda de Islas, Rafael Rúa y Alvarez, etc.): "Amo a tu tierra mas que a nada en el mundo; todos los cantos que brotaron de su alma de poeta, los ofrendo a ella en tributo de filial cariño, y ella agradecida, lo agogio en su seno, y cubrió sus restos con la pompa de sus jardines," (I love your land more than anything in the world; all the songs that sprang from his soul as a poet, were offered to her in affectionate filial tribute, and she grateful, took him in her womb, and covered his remains with the pomp of her gardens).

== Selected works ==
"Panorama Orizabeño Almas Provincianas" (1938); Nuestra Señora de los Puentes (1943); Pluviosilla Señorial y Legendaria (1955); among others like: "Anéctodas y otros Cuentos"; "Orizaba (álbum gráfico descriptivo)"; "Almas Provincianas y Crepúsculo y Senderos de Historia (obras inéditas)"

== Personal life ==
Aurelio Ortega Castañeda married Guadalupe María Micala Carrillo Limón, the daughter of Mexican politician and entrepreneur Manuel Carrillo Iturriaga, son of Manuel Carrillo Tablas, descended from one of the Grande families of Spain: the Carrillo de Albornoz family. They had three children (Armando Ortega, Hector Efraín Ortega (publisher and writer) and Alicia María Guadalupe Ortega Carrillo de Arenas, OSCD (who followed in her father's footsteps as an educator and writer both in the United States of America and in the Mexican Republic). She was also a secular order carmelite, serving as president of the community in Orizaba for a time. Her eldest daughter, Sister Teresita del Niño Jesús y de la Santa Faz (Norma Alicia Arenas Ortega,) is a cloistered carmelite nun at Cristo Rey Monastery in San Francisco, California.

== Death ==
Aurelio Ortega Castañeda died suddenly at his office of the family's Printing Press on January 11, 1958, in Orizaba, Veracruz. He is buried with his second son Hector Efrain Ortega de Carrillo in the city cemetery (Zona 1, Sección 6, Fila 12, Fosa 12). His wife, Doña Guadalupe Carrillo de Ortega, is buried with the couple's firstborn son the renown musician and composer Maestro Armando Ortega Carrillo (Zona 1, Sección 6, Fila 32, fosa 12). Don Aurelio and Doña Guadalupe's only daughter, Doña Alicia María Guadalupe Ortega Carrillo de Arenas, OSCD, died on the feast of St. Teresa's Transverberation (August 26, 2021) in Cordoba, Veracruz. Her remains were then transported to Los Angeles, California, to be buried in Calvary Cemetery, with her eldest son, Erick Gilberto Arenas Ortega.
