= 2025 Philippine gubernatorial elections =

- May 12, 2025

All 82 provincial governorships
	First party	Second party	Third party
Party	PFP	Lakas	Nacionalista
Last election	1	7	13
Seats before	32	12	11
Seats after	24	13	12
Seat change	▼8	▲1	▲1
	Fourth party	Fifth party	Sixth party
Party	NUP	NPC	PDP
Last election	8	12	24
Seats before	6	10	6
Seats after	7	5	4
Seat change	▲1	▼5	▼2
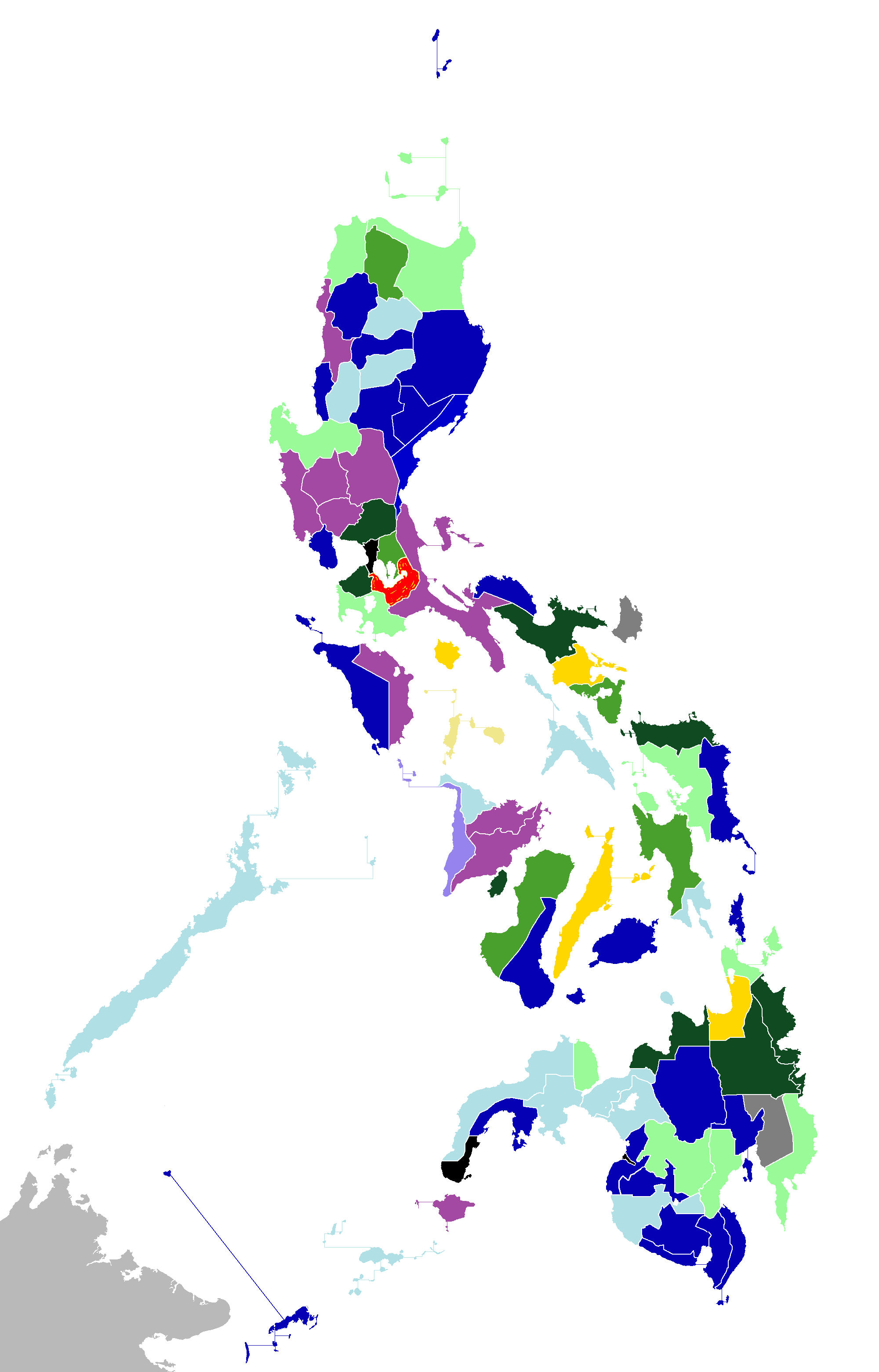
- Results of the gubernatorial elections by province
President of the League of Provinces of the Philippines before election
Reynaldo Tamayo Jr. (South Cotabato)
PFP
Elected President of the League of Provinces of the Philippines
Reynaldo Tamayo Jr. (South Cotabato)
PFP

Gubernatorial elections were held in the Philippines on May 12, 2025. All provinces will elect their provincial governors for three-year terms, who will be inaugurated on June 30, 2025, after their proclamation. Governors that are currently serving their third consecutive terms are prohibited from running as governors (they may run for any other posts however).

Metro Manila and highly urbanized and independent component cities such as Angeles City, Cebu City and Davao City are outside the jurisdiction of any province and thus do not run elections for governors of their mother provinces (Pampanga, Cebu and Davao del Sur respectively). These elected mayors instead.

== Summary ==
Party	2022 elections	Before elections	Won	%	Change (vs. before)
PFP	1	32	24	29.27%	▼8
Lakas	7	12	13	15.85%	▲1
Nacionalista	13	11	12	14.63%	▲1
NUP	8	6	7	8.54%	▲1
NPC	12	10	5	6.10%	▼5
PDP	24	6	4	4.88%	▼2
Aksyon	1	1	1	1.22%	0
LDP	0	1	1	1.22%	0
Liberal	1	0	1	1.22%	▲1
PDDS	3	0	0	0.00%	0
Reporma	2	0	0	0.00%	0
PRP	1	0	0	0.00%	0
KANP	1	0	0	0.00%	0
KBL	1	0	0	0.00%	0
Local parties	6	3	12	14.63%	▲9
Independent	0	0	2	2.44%	▲2
Totals	81	82	82	100%	▲1

== Luzon ==
=== Ilocos Region ===
==== Ilocos Norte ====
Incumbent Matthew Manotoc is running for Vice Governor swapping together with Incumbent Vice Governor Cecilia Araneta Marcos.

2025 Ilocos Norte gubernatorial election
Candidate	Party	Votes	%
Cecilia Araneta Marcos	Nacionalista Party	299,037	95.50
Arlene Jocelyn Butay	Independent	14,089	4.50
Total		313,126	100.00
Valid votes		313,126	80.71
Invalid/blank votes		74,831	19.29
Total votes		387,957	100.00
Nacionalista Party hold			

==== Ilocos Sur ====
Incumbent Governor Jerry Singson is running for reelection unopposed.

2025 Ilocos Sur gubernatorial election
Candidate	Party	Votes	%
Jerry Singson (incumbent)	Bileg Ti Ilokano	328,528	100.00
Total		328,528	100.00
Valid votes		328,528	75.95
Invalid/blank votes		104,027	24.05
Total votes		432,555	100.00
Bileg Ti Ilokano hold			

==== La Union ====
Incumbent Governor Raphaelle Ortega-David will run for reelection. Her primary opponent is her granduncle, Vice Governor Mario Eduardo Ortega.

2025 La Union gubernatorial election
Candidate	Party	Votes	%
Mario Eduardo Ortega	Partido Federal ng Pilipinas	277,097	60.02
Raphaelle Ortega-David (incumbent)	Nationalist People's Coalition	180,431	39.08
Emmanuel Fonseca	Independent	2,542	0.55
Paco Santiago	Independent	1,605	0.35
Total		461,675	100.00
Valid votes		461,675	94.79
Invalid/blank votes		25,398	5.21
Total votes		487,073	100.00
Partido Federal ng Pilipinas gain from Nationalist People's Coalition			

==== Pangasinan ====
Incumbent Governor Ramon Guico III will run for re-election. He will be running against former Governor Amado Espino III, whom he defeated in 2022.

2025 Pangasinan gubernatorial election
Candidate	Party	Votes	%
Ramon Guico III (incumbent)	Nacionalista Party	881,307	52.91
Amado Espino III	Abante Pangasinan-Ilokano Party	784,470	47.09
Total		1,665,777	100.00
Valid votes		1,665,777	95.50
Invalid/blank votes		78,506	4.50
Total votes		1,744,283	100.00
Nacionalista Party hold			

=== Cagayan Valley ===
==== Batanes ====
Governor Marilou Cayco is term-limited and will run for representative. Her party nominated former Vice Governor Ronaldo Aguto.

2025 Batanes gubernatorial election
Candidate	Party	Votes	%
Ronaldo Aguto	Partido Federal ng Pilipinas	3,947	35.31
Medardo Abad Jr.	Nationalist People's Coalition	3,738	33.44
Ignacio Villa	Liberal Party	2,018	18.05
Telesforo Castillejos	Aksyon Demokratiko	1,476	13.20
Total		11,179	100.00
Valid votes		11,179	97.31
Invalid/blank votes		309	2.69
Total votes		11,488	100.00
Partido Federal ng Pilipinas hold			

==== Cagayan ====
Governor Manuel Mamba is term-limited and is running for Vice Governor. His party nominated former PNP chief Edgar Aglipay.

2025 Cagayan gubernatorial election
Candidate	Party	Votes	%
Edgar Aglipay	Nacionalista Party	258,470	40.45
Zarah Rose Lara	Nationalist People's Coalition	231,041	36.16
Melvin Vargas Jr.	Independent	149,475	23.39
Total		638,986	100.00
Valid votes		638,986	94.80
Invalid/blank votes		35,078	5.20
Total votes		674,064	100.00
Nacionalista Party hold			

==== Isabela ====
Incumbent Governor Rodolfo Albano III will run for reelection.

2025 Isabela gubernatorial election
Candidate	Party	Votes	%
Rodolfo Albano III (incumbent)	Partido Federal ng Pilipinas	651,999	100.00
Total		651,999	100.00
Valid votes		651,999	76.95
Invalid/blank votes		195,302	23.05
Total votes		847,301	100.00
Partido Federal ng Pilipinas hold			

==== Nueva Vizcaya ====
Governor Jose Gambito will seek for his first full term. His opponents are Lone District Representative Luisa Cuaresma and former Board Member Maybelle Dumlao-Sevillena.

2025 Nueva Vizcaya gubernatorial election
Candidate	Party	Votes	%
Jose Gambito (incumbent)	Partido Federal ng Pilipinas	151,517	61.66
Luisa Cuaresma	United Nationalist Alliance	82,237	33.47
Maybelle Dumlao-Sevillena	Independent	11,986	4.88
Total		245,740	100.00
Valid votes		245,740	95.16
Invalid/blank votes		12,509	4.84
Total votes		258,249	100.00
Partido Federal ng Pilipinas hold			

==== Quirino ====
Governor Dakila Cua is running for reelection.

2025 Quirino gubernatorial election
Candidate	Party	Votes	%
Dakila Cua (incumbent)	Partido Federal ng Pilipinas	97,595	100.00
Total		97,595	100.00
Valid votes		97,595	86.90
Invalid/blank votes		14,715	13.10
Total votes		112,310	100.00
Partido Federal ng Pilipinas hold			

=== Cordillera Administrative Region ===
==== Abra ====
Governor Dominic Valera is running for mayor of Bangued. His grandson, Bangued vice mayor Kiko Bernos will run in his place against former Governor Eustaquio Bersamin.

2025 Abra gubernatorial election
Candidate	Party	Votes	%
Eustaquio Bersamin	Partido Federal ng Pilipinas	133,176	79.30
Kiko Bernos	Asenso Abrenio	34,755	20.70
Total		167,931	100.00
Valid votes		167,931	97.09
Invalid/blank votes		5,028	2.91
Total votes		172,959	100.00
Partido Federal ng Pilipinas gain from Asenso Abrenio			

==== Apayao ====
Governor Elias Bulut Jr. is running for reelection.

2025 Apayao gubernatorial election
Candidate	Party	Votes	%
Elias Bulut Jr. (incumbent)	Nationalist People's Coalition	58,175	100.00
Total		58,175	100.00
Valid votes		58,175	80.19
Invalid/blank votes		14,373	19.81
Total votes		72,548	100.00
Nationalist People's Coalition hold			

==== Benguet ====
Governor Melchor Diclas is running for reelection.

2025 Benguet gubernatorial election
Candidate	Party	Votes	%
Melchor Diclas (incumbent)	Lakas–CMD	116,212	57.44
Ruben Paoad	Independent	34,657	17.13
George Punasen	Independent	32,525	16.07
Johnny Waguis	Partido Federal ng Pilipinas	18,940	9.36
Total		202,334	100.00
Lakas–CMD hold			

==== Ifugao ====
Governor Jerry Dalipog is running for reelection. His main opponent is former Governor Eugene Balitang.

2025 Ifugao gubernatorial election
Candidate	Party	Votes	%
Jerry Dalipog (incumbent)	Lakas–CMD	80,486	70.41
Eugene Balitang	Partido Federal ng Pilipinas	30,833	26.97
Romy Ballatong	Independent	2,501	2.19
Rolando Paligan	Independent	486	0.43
Total		114,306	100.00
Lakas–CMD hold			

==== Kalinga ====
Governor James Edduba is running for reelection. His main opponent is Vice Governor Jocel Baac.

2025 Kalinga gubernatorial election
Candidate	Party	Votes	%
James Edduba (incumbent)	Lakas–CMD	75,305	55.23
Jocel Baac	Aksyon Demokratiko	61,035	44.77
Total		136,340	100.00
Lakas–CMD hold			

==== Mountain Province ====
Governor Bonifacio Lacwasan is running for reelection against former Sagada mayor Eduardo Latawan Jr.

2025 Mountain Province gubernatorial election
Candidate	Party	Votes	%
Bonifacio Lacwasan (incumbent)	Partido Federal ng Pilipinas	50,666	52.04
Eduardo Latawan Jr.	Independent	46,685	47.96
Total		97,351	100.00
Partido Federal ng Pilipinas hold			

=== Central Luzon ===
==== Aurora ====
Governor Reynante Tolentino is going up against former Governor Christian Noveras.

2025 Aurora gubernatorial election
Candidate	Party	Votes	%
Reynante Tolentino (incumbent)	Laban ng Demokratikong Pilipino	67,827	55.75
Christian Noveras	Partido Federal ng Pilipinas	53,829	44.25
Total		121,656	100.00
Laban ng Demokratikong Pilipino gain from Partido Federal ng Pilipinas			

==== Bataan ====
Governor Joet Garcia is running for reelection.

2025 Bataan gubernatorial election
Candidate	Party	Votes	%
Joet Garcia (incumbent)	Partido Federal ng Pilipinas	388,011	88.70
Estrella Santos	Independent	49,428	11.30
Total		437,439	100.00
Partido Federal ng Pilipinas hold			

==== Bulacan ====
Governor Daniel Fernando is running for reelection. His primary opponent is former Governor Wilhelmino Sy-Alvarado.

2025 Bulacan gubernatorial election
Candidate	Party	Votes	%
Daniel Fernando (incumbent)	National Unity Party	1,177,893	69.86
Wilhelmino Sy-Alvarado	Partido para sa Demokratikong Reporma	227,194	13.47
Salvador Violago	Partido Federal ng Pilipinas	226,204	13.42
Melissa Aquino	Independent	28,521	1.69
Jayson Ocampo	Independent	13,685	0.81
Clemente De Guzman	Independent	12,681	0.75
Total		1,686,178	100.00
National Unity Party hold			

==== Nueva Ecija ====
Incumbent Governor Aurelio Umali is running for reelection. His opponent is former General Tinio mayor Virgilio Bote.

2025 Nueva Ecija gubernatorial election
Candidate	Party	Votes	%
Aurelio Umali (incumbent)	Unang Sigaw	983,805	81.12
Virgilio Bote	Partido Federal ng Pilipinas	229,041	18.88
Total		1,212,846	100.00
Unang Sigaw hold			

==== Pampanga ====
Incumbent Dennis Pineda is running for Vice Governor swapping together with his mother, Incumbent Vice Governor Lilia Pineda. Her opponent is former Candaba mayor Danilo Baylon.

2025 Pampanga gubernatorial election
Candidate	Party	Votes	%
Lilia Pineda	Kambilan	709,694	59.48
Danilo Baylon	Independent	476,642	39.95
Amado Santos	Independent	6,864	0.58
Total		1,193,200	100.00
Kambilan hold			

==== Tarlac ====
Governor Susan Yap is term-limited and is running for mayor of Tarlac City. Her son, 2nd district representative Christian Tell Yap is running in her stead. His opponent is Paniqui mayor Max Roxas.

2025 Tarlac gubernatorial election
Candidate	Party	Votes	%
Christian T. Yap	Sama Sama Tarlac	482,338	63.72
Max Roxas	Partido Federal ng Pilipinas	256,827	33.93
Kathryn Ann Basco	Independent	8,823	1.17
Mark Joseph Garcia	Independent	7,256	0.96
Alfredo Bie	Independent	1,779	0.23
Total		757,023	100.00
Sama Sama Tarlac hold			

==== Zambales ====
Governor Hermogenes Ebdane is supposed to ran for reelection unopposed, but his opponent, Aeta leader and former board member Chito Balintay, secured a TRO from Supreme Court in January 2025.

Candidate	Party	Votes	%
Hermogenes Ebdane (incumbent)	Sulong Zambales Party	306,367	90.85
Chito Balintay	Independent	30,857	9.15
Total		337,224	100.00
Sulong Zambales Party hold			

=== Calabarzon ===
==== Batangas ====
Incumbent Hermilando Mandanas is term-limited and will be running for Vice Governor.

2025 Batangas gubernatorial election
Candidate	Party	Votes	%
Vilma Santos-Recto	Nacionalista Party	655,034	42.09
Michael Angelo Rivera	Liberal Party	532,531	34.22
Jay Ilagan	PROMDI	272,677	17.52
Walter Ozaeta	Partido Federal ng Pilipinas	95,946	6.17
Total		1,556,188	100.00
Valid votes		1,556,188	91.67
Invalid/blank votes		141,484	8.33
Total votes		1,697,672	100.00
Registered voters/turnout		1,958,794	86.67
Nacionalista Party gain from Partido Demokratiko Pilipino			

==== Cavite ====
Incumbent Athena Tolentino assumed office on October 8 after incumbent Jonvic Remulla was appointed as secretary of the interior and local government. She was supposed to run for vice governor, however she withdrew her candidacy. Her party nominated incumbent 7th district provincial board member Abeng Remulla for governor.

2025 Cavite gubernatorial election
Candidate	Party	Votes	%
Abeng Remulla	National Unity Party	1,058,412	73.56
Weng Aguinaldo	Independent	270,207	18.78
Augusto Pera Jr.	Independent	60,713	4.22
Gerbe Ber Ado	Independent	49,419	3.43
Total		1,438,751	100.00
Valid votes		1,438,751	74.79
Invalid/blank votes		484,974	25.21
Total votes		1,923,725	100.00
Registered voters/turnout		2,447,362	78.60
National Unity Party hold			

==== Laguna ====
Incumbent Ramil Hernandez is term-limited and will be running for 2nd District Representative. His wife, incumbent 2nd District Representative Ruth Hernandez will run in his stead.

2025 Laguna gubernatorial election
Candidate	Party	Votes	%
Sol Aragones	Akay National Political Party	635,570	39.80
Ruth Hernandez	Lakas–CMD	548,286	34.33
Danilo Fernandez	National Unity Party	285,373	17.87
Katherine Agapay	Partido Federal ng Pilipinas	114,758	7.19
Alexander Tolentino	Independent	6,418	0.40
Caloy Reyes	Independent	4,508	0.28
Manolo Samia	Independent	2,063	0.13
Total		1,596,976	100.00
Valid votes		1,596,976	93.91
Invalid/blank votes		103,653	6.09
Total votes		1,700,629	100.00
Registered voters/turnout		2,140,124	79.46
Akay National Political Party gain from Lakas–CMD			

==== Quezon ====
Governor Angelina Tan is running for reelection.

2025 Quezon gubernatorial election
Candidate	Party	Votes	%
Angelina Tan (incumbent)	Stand Up Quezon	1,011,465	100.00
Total		1,011,465	100.00
Valid votes		1,011,465	80.77
Invalid/blank votes		240,740	19.23
Total votes		1,252,205	100.00
Registered voters/turnout		1,496,156	83.69
Stand Up Quezon hold			

==== Rizal ====
Governor Nina Ricci Ynares is running for reelection.

2025 Rizal gubernatorial election
Candidate	Party	Votes	%
Nina Ricci Ynares (incumbent)	Nationalist People's Coalition	884,132	83.48
Jose Velasco	Independent	75,331	7.11
Ronald Perez	Independent	55,214	5.21
Glenn Acol	Independent	44,386	4.19
Total		1,059,063	100.00
Valid votes		1,059,063	83.03
Invalid/blank votes		216,389	16.97
Total votes		1,275,452	100.00
Registered voters/turnout		1,671,643	76.30
Nationalist People's Coalition hold			

=== Mimaropa ===
==== Marinduque ====
Incumbent Governor Presbitero Velasco will run for congressman. His son, representative Lord Allan Velasco will run in his stead.

2025 Marinduque gubernatorial election
Candidate	Party	Votes	%
Melecio Go	Partido Demokratiko Pilipino	66,115	50.15
Lord Allan Velasco	Nationalist People's Coalition	65,726	49.85
Total		131,841	100.00
Valid votes		131,841	92.84
Invalid/blank votes		10,175	7.16
Total votes		142,016	100.00
Registered voters/turnout		165,436	85.84
Partido Demokratiko Pilipino gain from Nationalist People's Coalition			

==== Occidental Mindoro ====
Governor Eduardo Gadiano will run for reelection unopposed.

2025 Occidental Mindoro gubernatorial election
Candidate	Party	Votes	%
Eduardo Gadiano (incumbent)	Partido Federal ng Pilipinas	200,673	100.00
Total		200,673	100.00
Valid votes		200,673	78.38
Invalid/blank votes		55,361	21.62
Total votes		256,034	100.00
Registered voters/turnout		321,699	79.59
Partido Federal ng Pilipinas hold			

==== Oriental Mindoro ====
Governor Humerlito Dolor is running for reelection.

2025 Oriental Mindoro gubernatorial election
Candidate	Party	Votes	%
Humerlito Dolor (incumbent)	Galing at Serbisyo para sa Mindoreño	235,935	54.34
Joanna Valencia-De Jesus	Independent	129,070	29.73
Orven Rabino	Partido Federal ng Pilipinas	69,168	15.93
Total		434,173	100.00
Valid votes		434,173	93.18
Invalid/blank votes		31,761	6.82
Total votes		465,934	100.00
Registered voters/turnout		569,601	81.80
Galing at Serbisyo para sa Mindoreño hold			

==== Palawan ====
Governor Victorino Dennis Socrates is running for reelection.

2025 Palawan gubernatorial election
Candidate	Party	Votes	%
Amy Alvarez	Lakas–CMD	264,363	56.88
Victorino Dennis Socrates (incumbent)	Aksyon Demokratiko	193,336	41.60
Richard Lopez	Reform PH Party	7,034	1.51
Total		464,733	100.00
Valid votes		464,733	91.42
Invalid/blank votes		43,611	8.58
Total votes		508,344	100.00
Registered voters/turnout		787,755	64.53
Lakas–CMD gain from Aksyon Demokratiko			

==== Romblon ====
Governor Jose Riano is running for reelection.

2025 Romblon gubernatorial election
Candidate	Party	Votes	%
Trina Firmalo-Fabic	Liberal Party	93,425	54.67
Jose Riano (incumbent)	Partido Federal ng Pilipinas	76,541	44.79
Jolly Monton	Partido Maharlika	930	0.54
Total		170,896	100.00
Valid votes		170,896	95.58
Invalid/blank votes		7,904	4.42
Total votes		178,800	100.00
Registered voters/turnout		211,336	84.60
Liberal Party gain from Partido Federal ng Pilipinas			

=== Bicol Region ===
==== Albay ====
Incumbent Governor Edcel Greco Lagman is supposed to run for his first full term. However, he withdrew his candidacy on December 5 and threw his support to former Governor Noel Rosal. Rosal's primary opponent is former Governor and incumbent 2nd district representative Joey Salceda.

2025 Albay gubernatorial election
Candidate	Party	Votes	%
Noel Rosal	Partido Demokratiko Pilipino	404,015	50.19
Joey Salceda	Lakas–CMD	394,822	49.04
Rosaler Sara Jr.	Independent	6,195	0.77
Total		805,032	100.00
Partido Demokratiko Pilipino hold			

==== Camarines Norte ====
Governor Ricarte Padilla is running for reelection. His primary opponent is former Governor Edgar Tallado.

2025 Camarines Norte gubernatorial election
Candidate	Party	Votes	%
Ricarte Padilla (incumbent)	Partido Federal ng Pilipinas	203,987	62.08
Edgar Tallado	Nationalist People's Coalition	122,915	37.41
Romeo Balmeo	Independent	1,693	0.52
Total		328,595	100.00
Partido Federal ng Pilipinas hold			

==== Camarines Sur ====
Incumbent governor Luigi Villafuerte is running for congressman. His father, former Governor & term-limited 2nd district representative Luis Raymond Villafuerte will ran in his place.

2025 Camarines Sur gubernatorial election
Candidate	Party	Votes	%
Luis Raymond Villafuerte	National Unity Party	526,887	54.84
Ronald Rodriguez	Nationalist People's Coalition	433,855	45.16
Total		960,742	100.00
National Unity Party hold			

==== Catanduanes ====
Governor Joseph Cua is term-limited and will run for mayor of Virac. His brother, Vice Governor Peter Cua is running in his place.

2025 Catanduanes gubernatorial election
Candidate	Party	Votes	%
Patrick Azanza	Independent	76,169	47.27
Peter Cua	Lakas–CMD	75,807	47.05
Macairog Alberto	Independent	6,660	4.13
Oliver Rodulfo	Independent	2,489	1.54
Total		161,125	100.00
Independent gain from Lakas–CMD			

==== Masbate ====
Governor Antonio Kho is term-limited and will run for congressman. His son, 1st district representative Richard Kho will run in his place.

2025 Masbate gubernatorial election
Candidate	Party	Votes	%
Richard Kho	Lakas–CMD	321,100	71.08
Socrates Tuason	Liberal Party	130,615	28.92
Total		451,715	100.00
Lakas-CMD hold			

==== Sorsogon ====
Governor Boboy Hamor is running for reelection.

2025 Sorsogon gubernatorial election
Candidate	Party	Votes	%
Boboy Hamor (incumbent)	Nationalist People's Coalition	339,284	78.95
Cattleya So	Partido Federal ng Pilipinas	85,267	19.84
Edwin Zuñiga	Reform PH Party	5,208	1.21
Total		429,759	100.00
Nationalist People's Coalition hold			

== Visayas ==
=== Western Visayas ===
==== Aklan ====
Governor Jose Enrique Miraflores will run for reelection.

2025 Aklan gubernatorial election
Candidate	Party	Votes	%
Jose Enrique Miraflores (incumbent)	Lakas–CMD	232,694	74.87
Pier Teodosio	Independent	68,752	22.12
Willie Tolentino	Independent	9,362	3.01
Total		310,808	100.00
Registered voters/turnout		414,890	–
Lakas–CMD hold			
Source: Commission on Elections

==== Antique ====
Governor Rhodora Cadiao is term-limited and will run for representative. Her party nominated Vice Governor Edgar Denosta.

2025 Antique gubernatorial election
Candidate	Party	Votes	%
Paolo Javier	Aksyon Demokratiko	147,225	46.39
Jonathan Tan	Independent	99,477	31.34
Edgar Denosta	Nacionalista Party	50,935	16.05
Vic Fedelicio	Independent	16,044	5.06
Gaspar Gayona	Independent	1,545	0.49
Rudy Bantolo	Independent	1,160	0.37
Rodelo Pidoy	Independent	988	0.31
Total		317,374	100.00
Registered voters/turnout		399,553	–
Aksyon Demokratiko gain from National Unity Party			
Source: Commission on Elections

==== Capiz ====
Governor Fredenil Castro will run for reelection. His main opponent is former governor Esteban Evan Contreras.

2025 Capiz gubernatorial election
Candidate	Party	Votes	%
Fredenil Castro (incumbent)	One Capiz	363,221	85.56
Esteban Evan Contreras	Independent	57,828	13.62
Christopher Barrio	Independent	3,483	0.82
Total		424,532	100.00
Registered voters/turnout		539,459	–
One Capiz hold			
Source: Commission on Elections

==== Guimaras ====
Incumbent Governor Joaquin Carlos Nava is running for congressman. He will swap together with his wife, representative Ma. Lucille Nava.

2025 Guimaras gubernatorial election
Candidate	Party	Votes	%
Lucille Nava	National Unity Party	94,970	94.98
Maggie Cacho	Independent	5,024	5.02
Total		99,994	100.00
Registered voters/turnout		124,930	–
National Unity Party hold			
Source: Commission on Elections

==== Iloilo ====
Governor Arthur Defensor Jr. is running for reelection.

2025 Iloilo gubernatorial election
Candidate	Party	Votes	%
Arthur Defensor Jr. (incumbent)	Uswag Ilonggo	811,746	100.00
Total		811,746	100.00
Registered voters/turnout		1,649,730	–
Uswag Ilonggo hold			
Source: Commission on Elections

=== Central Visayas ===
==== Bohol ====
Governor Aris Aumentado is running for reelection. His main opponent is former Tagbilaran mayor Dan Lim.

2025 Bohol gubernatorial election
Candidate	Party	Votes	%
Aris Aumentado (incumbent)	Partido Federal ng Pilipinas	563,746	75.94
Dan Lim	Independent	153,748	20.71
Hardy Leopando	Labor Party Philippines	24,852	3.35
Total		742,346	100.00
Registered voters/turnout		981,564	–
Partido Federal ng Pilipinas hold			
Source: Commission on Elections

==== Cebu ====
Governor Gwendolyn Garcia is running for reelection.

2025 Cebu gubernatorial election
Candidate	Party	Votes	%
Pam Baricuatro	Partido Demokratiko Pilipino	1,107,924	58.11
Gwendolyn Garcia (incumbent)	One Cebu	765,051	40.13
Valeriano Gingco	Independent	33,563	1.76
Total		1,906,538	100.00
Registered voters/turnout		3,407,780	–
Partido Demokratiko Pilipino gain from One Cebu			
Source: Commission on Elections

=== Negros Island Region ===
==== Negros Occidental ====
Governor Eugenio Jose Lacson is running for reelection.

2025 Negros Occidental gubernatorial election
Candidate	Party	Votes	%
Eugenio Jose Lacson (incumbent)	Nationalist People's Coalition	911,614	87.71
Wantan Palanca	Partido Demokratiko Pilipino	67,694	6.51
Ferdenand Diego	Independent	24,116	2.32
Toto Librando	Independent	22,379	2.15
J. Paul Octaviano	Partido Lakas ng Masa	13,589	1.31
Total		1,039,392	100.00
Registered voters/turnout		2,001,732	–
Nationalist People's Coalition hold			
Source: Commission on Elections

==== Negros Oriental ====
Governor Chaco Sagarbarria is going up against former Governor Pryde Henry Teves.

2025 Negros Oriental gubernatorial election
Candidate	Party	Votes	%
Chaco Sagarbarria (incumbent)	Partido Federal ng Pilipinas	365,020	52.41
Pryde Henry Teves	Liberal Party	254,415	36.53
Joh Jaos	Independent	36,189	5.20
Glendol Badon	Independent	30,144	4.33
Alex Larita	Independent	6,772	0.97
Stephen Tuballa	Independent	3,897	0.56
Total		696,437	100.00
Registered voters/turnout		976,185	–
Partido Federal ng Pilipinas hold			
Source: Commission on Elections

==== Siquijor ====
Governor Jake Vincent Villa is running for reelection.

2025 Siquijor gubernatorial election
Candidate	Party	Votes	%
Jake Vincent Villa (incumbent)	Partido Federal ng Pilipinas	42,149	57.99
Cacang Masayon	Aksyon Demokratiko	30,529	42.01
Total		72,678	100.00
Registered voters/turnout		81,404	–
Partido Federal ng Pilipinas hold			
Source: Commission on Elections

=== Eastern Visayas ===
==== Biliran ====
Governor Gerard Espina will not seek for reelection. He nominated his father, former Governor Rogelio Espina.

2025 Biliran gubernatorial election
Candidate	Party	Votes	%
Rogelio Espina	Nacionalista Party	74,282	91.59
Edgardo Ambo	Independent	5,007	6.17
Jolan Bohol	Independent	1,817	2.24
Total		81,106	100.00
Nacionalista Party hold			

==== Eastern Samar ====
Governor Ben Evardone is supposed to run for reelection. On October 8, he withdrew his candidacy and substituted by his son, Sulat councilor Ralph Vincent Evardone.

2025 Eastern Samar gubernatorial election
Candidate	Party	Votes	%
Ralph Vincent Evardone	Partido Federal ng Pilipinas	204,564	72.61
Rafael Abesias	Alliance for Barangay Concerns	77,178	27.39
Total		281,742	100.00
Partido Federal ng Pilipinas hold			

==== Leyte ====
Governor Jericho Petilla is running for reelection.

2025 Leyte gubernatorial election
Candidate	Party	Votes	%
Jericho Petilla (incumbent)	Nationalist People's Coalition	661,299	94.98
Romeo Plasquita	Independent	34,986	5.02
Total		696,285	100.00
Nationalist People's Coalition hold			

==== Northern Samar ====
Governor Edwin Ongchuan is running for congressman. He will swap with his cousin, 2nd district representative Harris Ongchuan.

2025 Northern Samar gubernatorial election
Candidate	Party	Votes	%
Harris Ongchuan	National Unity Party	212,471	79.28
Harlin Abayon	Aksyon Demokratiko	48,792	18.21
Essie Unay	Independent	6,750	2.52
Total		268,013	100.00
National Unity Party hold			

==== Samar ====
Governor Sharee Ann Tan is running for reelection unopposed.

2025 Samar gubernatorial election
Candidate	Party	Votes	%
Sharee Ann Tan (incumbent)	Nacionalista Party	419,470	100.00
Total		419,470	100.00
Nacionalista Party hold			

==== Southern Leyte ====
Governor Damian Mercado is running for reelection.

2025 Southern Leyte gubernatorial election
Candidate	Party	Votes	%
Damian Mercado (incumbent)	Lakas–CMD	126,536	50.65
Amalia Yap	Independent	121,334	48.56
Leo Oliverio	Independent	1,978	0.79
Total		249,848	100.00
Lakas–CMD hold			

== Mindanao ==
=== Zamboanga Peninsula ===
==== Sulu ====
Governor Abdusakur Tan forwent a third term and running for Vice Governor. He nominated his son, Vice Governor Abdusakur Tan II. His opponent is former Banguingui mayor Adbulwahid Sahidulla.

2025 Sulu gubernatorial election
Candidate	Party	Votes	%
Abdusakur Tan II	Lakas–CMD	362,986	96.28
Abdulwahid Sahidulla	Kilusang Bagong Lipunan	14,043	3.72
Total		377,029	100.00
Lakas–CMD hold			

==== Zamboanga del Norte ====
Governor Rosalina Jalosjos is running for mayor of Dipolog. Her nephew, Dapitan mayor Bullet Jalosjos will run in her stead. His opponent is Dipolog mayor Darel Dexter Uy.

2025 Zamboanga del Norte gubernatorial election
Candidate	Party	Votes	%
Darel Dexter Uy	Lakas–CMD	366,165	61.22
Bullet Jalosjos	Partido Federal ng Pilipinas	226,863	37.93
Javier Obnimaga	Independent	5,094	0.85
Total		598,122	100.00
Lakas–CMD gain from Partido Federal ng Pilipinas			

==== Zamboanga del Sur ====
Governor Victor Yu is running for mayor of Pagadian. His wife, 1st district representative Divina Grace Yu will run in his place. Her opponent is Dumalinao mayor Junaflor Cerilles.

2025 Zamboanga del Sur gubernatorial election
Candidate	Party	Votes	%
Divina Grace Yu	Lakas–CMD	320,389	56.07
Junaflor Cerilles	Nationalist People's Coalition	251,035	43.93
Total		571,424	100.00
Lakas–CMD hold			

==== Zamboanga Sibugay ====
Governor Dulce Ann Hofer is running for reelection. Her opponent is Board Member Yvonne Palma.

2025 Zamboanga Sibugay gubernatorial election
Candidate	Party	Votes	%
Dulce Ann Hofer (incumbent)	Partido Federal ng Pilipinas	211,433	61.96
Yvonne Palma	Lakas–CMD	129,783	38.04
Total		341,216	100.00
Partido Federal ng Pilipinas hold			

=== Northern Mindanao ===
==== Bukidnon ====
Governor Rogelio Neil Roque is running for reelection. His primary opponent is Valencia mayor Azucena Huervas.

2025 Bukidnon gubernatorial election
Candidate	Party	Votes	%
Rogelio Neil Roque (incumbent)	Partido Federal ng Pilipinas	392,204	53.10
Azucena Huervas	National Unity Party	188,947	25.58
Arbie Llesis	Independent	111,397	15.08
Miguel Silva Jr.	Independent	39,215	5.31
Andrew Eligan	Labor Party Philippines	6,909	0.94
Total		738,672	100.00
Partido Federal ng Pilipinas hold			

==== Camiguin ====
Governor Xavier Jesus Romualdo is running for reelection.

2025 Camiguin gubernatorial election
Candidate	Party	Votes	%
Xavier Jesus Romualdo (incumbent)	Lakas–CMD	42,067	71.09
Homer Mabale	Independent	17,105	28.91
Total		59,172	100.00
Lakas–CMD hold			

==== Lanao del Norte ====
Governor Imelda Dimaporo is term limited and will run for representative. Her son, 1st district representative Mohamad Khalid Dimaporo will run in her place.

2025 Lanao del Norte gubernatorial election
Candidate	Party	Votes	%
Mohamad Khalid Dimaporo	Lakas–CMD	258,853	90.28
Sabdullah Abubacar	United Nationalist Alliance	27,883	9.72
Total		286,736	100.00
Lakas–CMD hold			

==== Misamis Occidental ====
Governor Henry Oaminal is running for reelection. His main opponent is Bonifacio mayor Samson Dumanjug.

2025 Misamis Occidental gubernatorial election
Candidate	Party	Votes	%
Henry Oaminal (incumbent)	Nacionalista Party	297,067	88.13
Samson Dumanjug	National Unity Party	38,330	11.37
Marc Lester Malandaya	Independent	1,256	0.37
Bibiano Salvanera	Independent	416	0.12
Total		337,069	100.00
Nacionalista Party hold			

==== Misamis Oriental ====
Governor Peter Unabia is running for reelection against former 2nd district representative Juliette Uy.

2025 Misamis Oriental gubernatorial election
Candidate	Party	Votes	%
Juliette Uy	National Unity Party	327,305	57.76
Peter Unabia (incumbent)	Lakas–CMD	235,023	41.48
Merlito Simacon	Independent	4,306	0.76
Total		566,634	100.00
National Unity Party gain from Lakas–CMD			

=== Davao Region ===
==== Davao de Oro ====
Incumbent Dorothy Gonzaga is running for Vice Governor. Her party nominated her husband, 2nd district representative Ruwell Peter Gonzaga.

2025 Davao de Oro gubernatorial election
Candidate	Party	Votes	%
Raul Mabanglo	Independent	239,933	51.41
Ruwell Peter Gonzaga	Partido Federal ng Pilipinas	226,788	48.59
Total		466,721	100.00
Independent gain from Partido Federal ng Pilipinas			

==== Davao del Norte ====
Governor Edwin Jubahib is running for reelection. His main opponent is 2nd district representative Allan Dujali.

2025 Davao del Norte gubernatorial election
Candidate	Party	Votes	%
Edwin Jubahib (incumbent)	Partido Federal ng Pilipinas	323,396	58.03
Allan Dujali	Lakas–CMD	233,853	41.97
Total		557,249	100.00
Partido Federal ng Pilipinas hold			

==== Davao del Sur ====
Governor Yvonne Roña Cagas will run for reelection. She is going up against her cousin-in-law, Vice Governor Riafe Cagas-Fernandez.

2025 Davao del Sur gubernatorial election
Candidate	Party	Votes	%
Yvonne Roña Cagas (incumbent)	Nacionalista Party	256,486	73.95
Riafe Cagas Fernandez	Pwersa ng Masang Pilipino	85,463	24.64
Emilio Lustre Jr.	Independent	4,903	1.41
Total		346,852	100.00
Nacionalista Party hold			

==== Davao Occidental ====
Governor Franklin Bautista is running for reelection unopposed.

2025 Davao Occidental gubernatorial election
Candidate	Party	Votes	%
Franklin Bautista (incumbent)	Partido Federal ng Pilipinas	104,009	100.00
Total		104,009	100.00
Partido Federal ng Pilipinas hold			

==== Davao Oriental ====
Governor Niño Uy will seek for his first full term. His main opponent is former Governor and 1st district representative Nelson Dayanghirang.

2025 Davao Oriental gubernatorial election
Candidate	Party	Votes	%
Nelson Dayanghirang	Nacionalista Party	219,085	60.84
Niño Uy (incumbent)	Partido Federal ng Pilipinas	141,001	39.16
Total		360,086	100.00
Nacionalista Party gain from Partido Federal ng Pilipinas			

=== Soccsksargen ===
==== Cotabato ====
Governor Emmylou Taliño-Mendoza is going up against former agriculture secretary Emmanuel Piñol.

2025 Cotabato gubernatorial election
Candidate	Party	Votes	%
Emmylou Taliño-Mendoza (incumbent)	Nacionalista Party	414,043	63.61
Emmanuel Piñol	Nationalist People's Coalition	234,393	36.01
Manuel Adajar	Independent	2,446	0.38
Total		650,882	100.00
Nacionalista Party hold			

==== Sarangani ====
Governor Rogelio Pacquiao is running for reelection.

2025 Sarangani gubernatorial election
Candidate	Party	Votes	%
Rogelio Pacquiao (incumbent)	Partido Federal ng Pilipinas	155,989	66.31
Mohamad Bong Aquia	Partido Demokratiko Pilipino	73,823	31.38
Gladden Lim	Partido Maharlika	5,424	2.31
Total		235,236	100.00
Partido Federal ng Pilipinas hold			

==== South Cotabato ====
Governor Reynaldo Tamayo Jr. will run for reelection.

2025 South Cotabato gubernatorial election
Candidate	Party	Votes	%
Reynaldo Tamayo Jr. (incumbent)	Partido Federal ng Pilipinas	346,611	69.73
April Rose Espinosa-Miguel	Aksyon Demokratiko	146,789	29.53
Efren Biclar	Independent	1,903	0.38
Ramir Badayos	Independent	1,748	0.35
Total		497,051	100.00
Partido Federal ng Pilipinas hold			

==== Sultan Kudarat ====
Governor Pax Ali Mangudadatu will run for reelection.

2025 Sultan Kudarat gubernatorial election
Candidate	Party	Votes	%
Datu Pax Ali Mangudadatu (incumbent)	Lakas–CMD	302,401	81.03
Sharifa Akeel-Mangudadatu	Partido Federal ng Pilipinas	47,393	12.70
Raden Sakaluran	Independent	14,767	3.96
Nelrey Calvo	Independent	8,632	2.31
Total		373,193	100.00
Lakas–CMD hold			

=== Caraga ===
==== Agusan del Norte ====
Governor Angelica Amante will run for reelection.

2025 Agusan del Norte gubernatorial election
Candidate	Party	Votes	%
Angelica Amante (incumbent)	Partido Demokratiko Pilipino	192,145	97.19
Emon Peligreno	Independent	5,552	2.81
Total		197,697	100.00
Partido Demokratiko Pilipino hold			

==== Agusan del Sur ====
Governor Santiago Cane Jr. will run for reelection.

2025 Agusan del Sur gubernatorial election
Candidate	Party	Votes	%
Santiago Cane Jr. (incumbent)	National Unity Party	222,217	85.67
Edgard Engles	Independent	37,158	14.33
Total		259,375	100.00
National Unity Party hold			

==== Dinagat Islands ====
Governor Nilo Demerey Jr. will run for reelection. His opponent is former Libjo mayor Sonny Llamera.

2025 Dinagat Islands gubernatorial election
Candidate	Party	Votes	%
Nilo Demerey Jr. (incumbent)	Partido Federal ng Pilipinas	41,679	60.96
Sonny Llamera	Independent	26,694	39.04
Total		68,373	100.00
Partido Federal ng Pilipinas hold			

==== Surigao del Norte ====
Governor Lyndon Barbers will run for reelection against 1st district Representative Francisco Jose Matugas II.

2025 Surigao del Norte gubernatorial election
Candidate	Party	Votes	%
Robert Lyndon Barbers (incumbent)	Nacionalista Party	174,675	50.49
Francisco Jose Matugas II	Lakas–CMD	169,181	48.90
Emeteria Vega	Independent	2,113	0.61
Total		345,969	100.00
Nacionalista Party hold			

==== Surigao del Sur ====
Governor Alexander Pimentel is running for congressman. His brother, 2nd district representative Johnny Pimentel will run in his place.

2025 Surigao del Sur gubernatorial election
Candidate	Party	Votes	%
Johnny Pimentel	National Unity Party	252,477	68.74
Epimaco Densing III	Aksyon Demokratiko	97,884	26.65
Aniceto Murillo	Independent	6,928	1.89
Mario Lumanao Jr.	Independent	3,521	0.96
Mitchel Urbiztondo	Independent	3,247	0.88
Joseph Arniego	Independent	3,223	0.88
Total		367,280	100.00
National Unity Party hold			

=== Bangsamoro Autonomous Region in Muslim Mindanao ===
==== Basilan ====
Governor Hadjiman Hataman-Salliman is term-limited and is running for Vice Governor. His son, 2nd district board member Jimael Salam Hataman-Salliman will run in his stead.

2025 Basilan gubernatorial election
Candidate	Party	Votes	%
Mujiv Hataman	Basilan Unity Party	121,829	50.50
Jimael Salam Hataman-Salliman	Partido Federal ng Pilipinas	118,554	49.14
Osama Mutamad	Partido para sa Demokratikong Reporma	856	0.35
Total		241,239	100.00
Basilan Unity Party gain Partido Federal ng Pilipinas			

==== Lanao del Sur ====
Governor Mamintal Adiong Jr. is running for reelection.

2025 Lanao del Sur gubernatorial election
Candidate	Party	Votes	%
Mamintal Adiong Jr. (incumbent)	Lakas–CMD	382,050	70.68
Fiat Macarambon	Partido Federal ng Pilipinas	158,483	29.32
Total		540,533	100.00
Lakas–CMD gain			

==== Maguindanao del Norte ====
Governor Abdulraof Macacua did not file his candidacy for a first full term. His party then nominated Sultan Kudarat mayor Tucao Mastura. In March 2025, Macacua was appointed interim chief minister of Bangsamoro by President Bongbong Marcos. He was succeeded by provincial board member Sharifudin Panga Mastura (Tucao Mastura's youngest son), since the vice governor's office was vacated by Ainee Sinsuat in 2023 due to a political crisis.

2025 Maguindanao del Norte gubernatorial election
Candidate	Party	Votes	%
Tucao Mastura	Partido Federal ng Pilipinas	199,049	72.30
Suharto Mangudadatu	Al Ittahad–UKB Party	76,260	27.70
Total		275,309	100.00
Partido Federal ng Pilipinas hold			

==== Maguindanao del Sur ====
Governor Bai Mariam Sangki-Mangudadatu is going up against former Talayan mayor Ali Midtimbang.

2025 Maguindanao del Sur gubernatorial election
Candidate	Party	Votes	%
Datu Ali Midtimbang	Partido Federal ng Pilipinas	180,945	53.11
Bai Mariam Sangki-Mangudadatu (incumbent)	Nacionalista Party	159,746	46.89
Total		340,691	100.00
Partido Federal ng Pilipinas gain from Nacionalista Party			

==== Tawi-Tawi ====
Governor Yshmael Sali will run for reelection is going against former Representative Ruby Sahali.

2025 Tawi-Tawi gubernatorial election
Candidate	Party	Votes	%
Yshmael Sali (incumbent)	Partido Federal ng Pilipinas	133,217	67.87
Ruby Sahali	Aksyon Demokratiko	63,078	32.13
Total		196,295	100.00
Partido Federal ng Pilipinas hold			
