= Antonio Ortega Martínez =

Mexican politician

- Born: 28 July 1954 (age 72); Aguascalientes, Mexico
- Occupation: Politician
- Political party: PRD; PMS (former); PST (former)

Antonio Ortega Martínez (Note: In this Mexican name, the surname is Ortega and the second or maternal family name is Martínez.) (born 28 July 1954) is a Mexican politician from the Party of the Democratic Revolution (PRD). He is a native of the state of Aguascalientes.

Ortega Martínez served in the 54th session of the Congress of Aguascalientes (1992–1995) and, in the 2006 general election, he was elected to a plurinominal seat in the federal Chamber of Deputies for the 60th Congress (2006–2009).
