= Ortega Martínez =

Ortega Martínez is a Spanish surname; the paternal surname is Ortega and the second or maternal family name is Martínez. Notable people with this name include:

- Antonio Ortega Martínez (born 1954), Mexican politician
- Cristóbal Ortega Martínez (1956–2025), Mexican footballer
- Jesús Ortega Martínez (born 1952), Mexican politician
- Lauro Ortega Martínez (1910–1999), Mexican politician and veterinarian
- Mariano Ortega Martínez (born 1971), Spanish handball player and coach
- Pilar Ortega Martínez (born 1968), Mexican politician
- Rogelio Ortega Martínez (born 1955), Mexican educator and politician

== See also ==
- Gonzalo Martínez Ortega (1934–1998), Mexican actor, director, screenwriter and producer
