= Aurelio Ortega y Placeres =

Don Aurelio Ortega y Placeres
- Born: 27 April 1863; Tlaxcala, Mexico
- Died: 18 September 1926 (aged 63); Orizaba, Veracruz, Mexico
- Spouse: María Castañeda

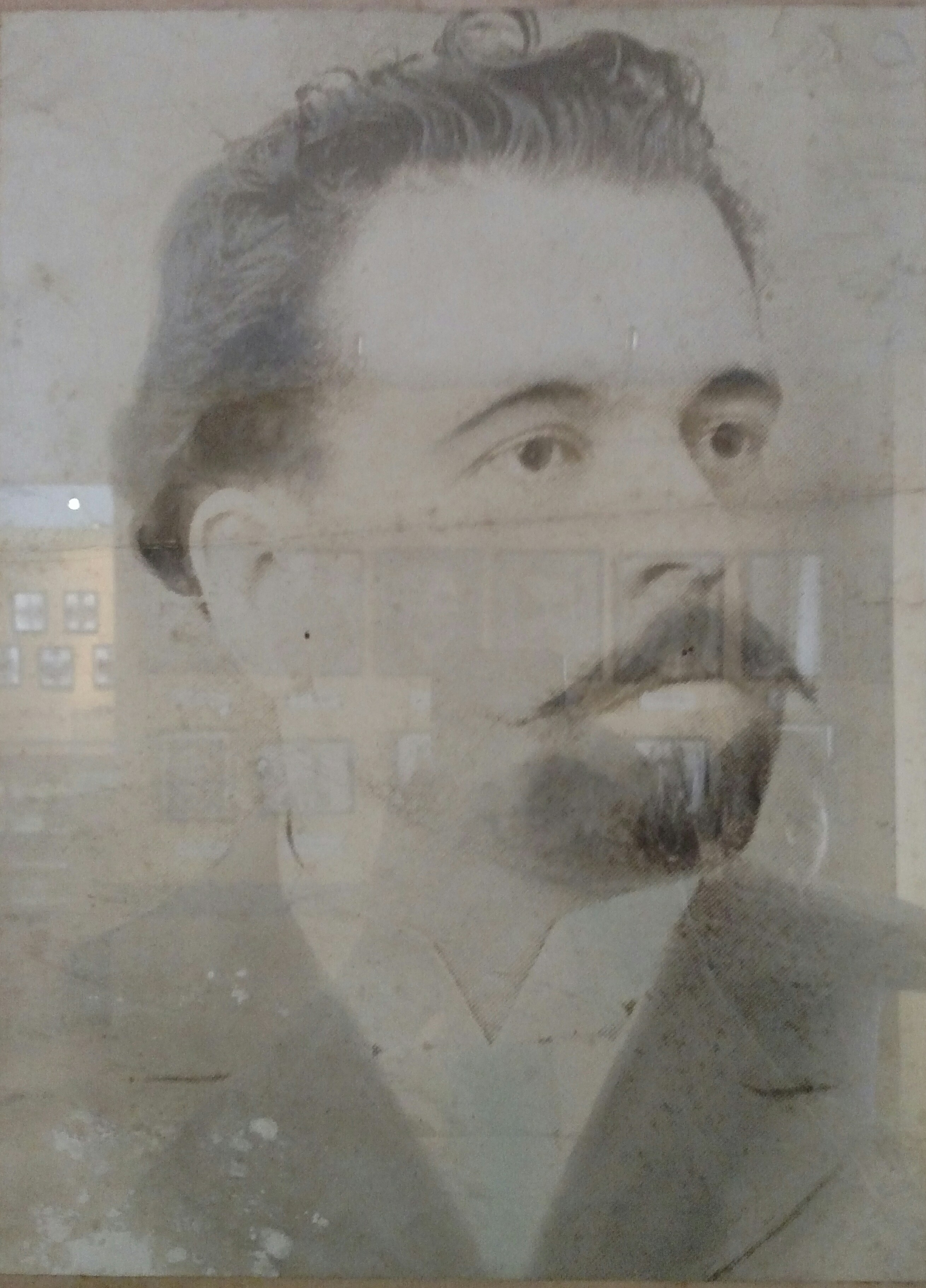
Don Aurelio Ortega y Placeres. Image housed at AMO (Archivo Municipal de Orizaba)

Aurelio Ortega y Placeres (1863–1926) was director of the school San Luis Gonzaga in Orizaba, Veracruz, Mexico.

== Personal life ==
Ortega was born in Tlaxcala on April 27, 1863, the son of Coronel Regino Ortega and Josefa Placeres. He married María Castañeda (1870–1936) at the end of the 19th century. They had 13 children (Domingo, Beatriz, Efraín, Aurelio, Raúl, María, Esther, Roberto, Amparo, Josefina, María Teresa, Martha and Guillermo). Ortega is sometimes named "El Grande" to distinguish him from his son Aurelio Ortega Castañeda, who was the father of the composer Armando Ortega. Ortega died in 1926 at the age of 64 in the family home in Orizaba, Veracruz.

== Career ==
Ortega became a writer, educator and the director of the primary school San Luis Gonzaga located on the current "Calle Real". In 1904 he annexed the first school of Artes y Oficios "Teodoro A Dehesa," where apart from the teaching of the classics (mathematics, geography, etc.), the school also taught those subjects corresponding to the trades of the time (carpentry, cabinetmaking, printing, painting, and embroidery for girls, etc.) Prior to 1895 he already owned the stationery company "El Lápiz Rojo."

His sons, Aurelio, Domingo, Efraín, and Raul would go on to create the first and to this date, the only children published newspaper in Orizaba, "El Salvador de la Infancia," back in 1907. Don Aurelio was considered a liberal man for this days, favoring those most in need. In 1908 he would go on to publish a newspaper dedicated to workers: "Ideas Nuevas." On January 7, 1907, en Rio Blanco, he founded a nocturnal school for workers. Concerned about the education in Mexico, he presented a study on the subject to then Mexican President General Alvaro Obregón. He hoped the study would serve as a base to the Secretary of Public Education. Father Rafael Rúa y Álvarez in 1958 stated, "...from the lips of Don Aurelio I heard many times wise advice, when I was just starting my higher studies, I needed a manly voice, authorized by intelligence and goodness, like his, to guide my paths."
