= Ortega (rapper) =

Israeli singer and rapper

Jonathan Yehudai יונתן יהודאי
- Born: March 4, 1985 (age 41); Herzliya
- Genres: Hip hop
- Occupations: Rapper; singer; songwriter; record producer

Jonathan Yehudai (Hebrew: יונתן יהודאי; born March 4, 1985, in Herzliya), also known by his stage name Ortega (Hebrew: אורטגה, sometimes as OTG and also as OT CRACK), is an Israeli singer and rapper. Ortega appeared on Music Channel 24 youth program "Raesh" as the host of the hip-hop segment for two seasons.

== Music career ==
In 2003, he began his career in the Israeli music industry with the group IMF, and appeared with them on the show "Black Business", won the freestyle contest based on improvised rap, and released his first song, "Puff 2003". He then joined the hip-hop collective "P.R. Troopers", which also included Itay Lukacs, Noa Faran, Klin and Peled. Led by Gadi Khinkis, the band released one album, "Out of the Filth". The band subsequently collaborated with the band Hadag Nahash on their album "With the Help of the Jam" on the song "Bring the Blow", which sold over 20,000 copies.

Ortega teamed up with rapper Peled, and they began working on a debut album and performing on various stages. That same year, Ortega performed a tribute to the rap group Shabak S, where he grew up. Ortega has released five mixtapes, four albums, and one EP.

In 2009, he released the mixtape "Ortega the Best-2003-2009", which included old songs he participated in. In late 2009, he released the mixtape "04:47", produced by Borgore, which was his first independent project, to a packed launch show at the Barzilai Club, and collaborated with Shiri Maimon on a song for an international project. In late 2010, he released another mixtape, "OTG MIXTAPE 2010".

In December 2020, he released his fourth album, "Black Gold", in which he collaborated with several artists such as Tuna, Cohen, Shira Gavrielov, Amit Sagi and Ofiri.

== Discography ==
=== EP ===
- 2022: 04:47
- 2004: מתוך הזוהמה
- 2007: ממשיכים לבעוט
- 2010: משלוח מיוחד
- 2011: סנדוויץ' פועלים
- 2020: זהב שחור (אלבום)
- 2024: שפע מאורגן

== See also ==
- Israeli hip hop
- Music of Israel
- Ofer Levi
- Jonathan Mergui
