= Francisco Ortega III =

Filipino politician

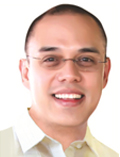

27th Governor of La Union
- In office June 30, 2016 – June 30, 2022
- Vice Governor: Aureo Nisce (2016–2019); Mario Ortega (2019–2022)
- Preceded by: Manuel C. Ortega
- Succeeded by: Raphaelle Ortega-David

Member of the Philippine House of Representatives for Abono
- In office June 30, 2007 – June 30, 2016 Serving with Conrado Estrella III (2013–2016); Robert Raymund Estrella (2007–2013)

Personal details
- Born: March 26, 1967 (age 59) San Fernando, La Union, Philippines
- Party: NPC (2021–present)
- Other political affiliations: PDP–Laban (2016–2021); Independent (2015–2016); Abono (partylist; 2007–2015)
- Spouse: Vini Nola Alviar
- Relations: Ortega family
- Children: 4, including Raphaelle
- Occupation: Politician

Francisco Emmanuel "Pacoy" Ramos Ortega III is a Filipino politician from La Union, Philippines who served as the governor of La Union from 2016 to 2022. He was elected to two terms as Governor of La Union. He first won election to governor in 2016 and was re-elected in 2019.
