= Governor of La Union =

Local chief executive

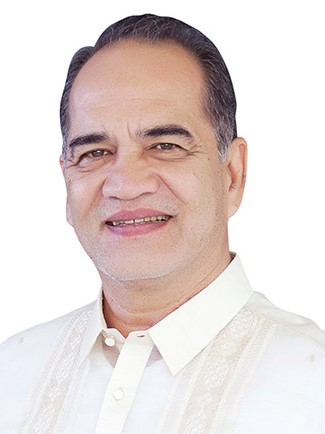
- Incumbent; Mario Eduardo Ortega since June 30, 2025
- Seat: La Union Provincial Capitol
- Term length: 3 years
- Inaugural holder: Lucino Almeida
- Formation: 1901 (civil government)
- Website: https://launion.gov.ph/provincial-governor/

The governor of La Union (Filipino: Punong Panlalawigan ng La Union) is the chief executive of the provincial government of La Union.

== List of governors of La Union ==
There have been 29 governors of La Union since the establishment of civil government by the Americans in 1901.

No.	Image	Governor	Term
1		Lucino Almeida	1901
2		Joaquin J. Ortega	1901-1904
3		Joaquin Luna	1904-1908
4		Sixto Zandueta	1908-1909
5		Francisco Zandueta	1910-1912
6		Mauro Ortiz	1913-1919
7		Pio Ancheta	1919-1922
8		Thomas F. de Guzman	1922-1923
9		Juan Lucero	1923-1928
(8)		Thomas F. de Guzman	1928-1931
(6)		Mauro Ortiz	1931-1934
10		Juan Rivera	1934-1937
11		Francisco Nisce	1937-1940
12		Jorge Camacho	1941-1942
13		Bonifacio Tadiar	1942-1944
14		Bernardo Gapuz	1944
15		Anastacio de Castro	1945
(12)		Jorge Camacho	1945-1946
16		Agaton Yaranon	1946-1947
17		Doroteo Aguila	1948-1951
18		Juan C. Carbonell	1952-1955
(14)		Bernardo Gapuz	1956-1959
19		Eulogio de Guzman	1960-1963
(18)		Juan C. Carbonell	1964-1967
20		Juvenal K. Guerrero	1968-1977
21		Thomas Asprer	1977-1986
22		Robert V. Dulay	1986-1987
23		Joaquin L. Ortega	1988-1992
24		Justo O. Orros Jr.	1992-2001
25		Victor Ortega	2001-2007
26		Manuel C. Ortega	2007-2016
27		Francisco Ortega III	2016-2022
28		Raphaelle Ortega-David	2022-2025
29		Mario Eduardo Ortega	2025-present

== See also ==
- List of vice governors of La Union
