= La Union Provincial Board =

Legislative body of the province of La Union, Philippines

La Union Provincial Board Sangguniang Panlalawigan ng La Union

Type
- Type: Unicameral
- Term limits: 3 terms (9 years)

Leadership
- Presiding Officer: Eric O. Sibuma (Lakas–CMD) since June 30, 2025

Structure
- Seats: 13 board members 1 ex officio presiding officer
- Political groups: Lakas–CMD (8) NPC (1) Independent (2) Nonpartisan (3)
- Length of term: 3 years
- Authority: Local Government Code of the Philippines

Elections
- Voting system: Multiple non-transferable vote (regular members); Indirect election (ex officio members); Acclamation (sectoral member)
- Last election: May 13, 2019
- Next election: May 9, 2022

Meeting place
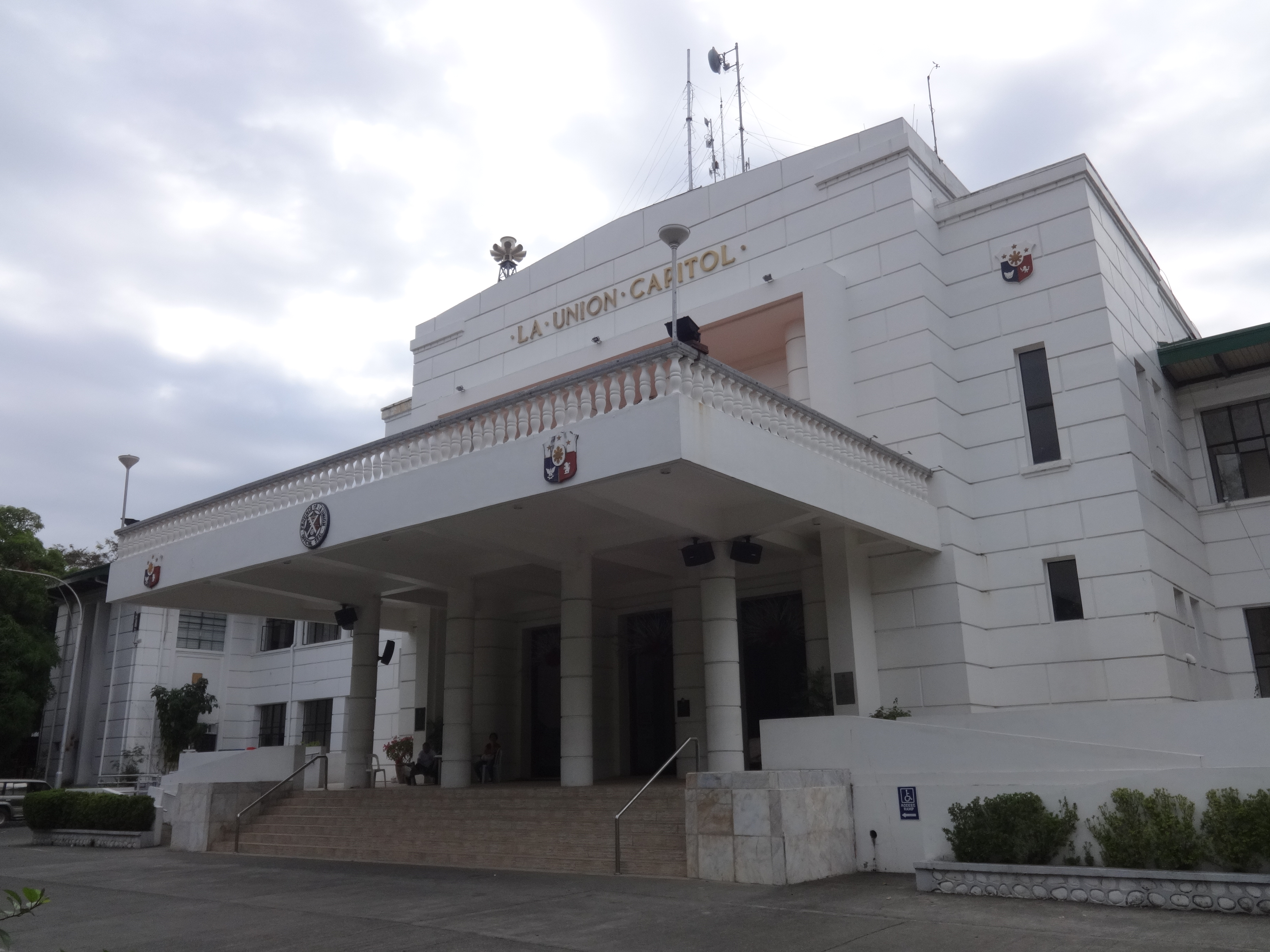
- La Union Capitol, San Fernando

The La Union Provincial Board is the Sangguniang Panlalawigan (provincial legislature) of the Philippine province of La Union.

The members are elected via plurality-at-large voting: the province is divided into two districts, each having five seats. A voter votes up to five names, with the top five candidates per district being elected. The vice governor is the ex officio presiding officer, and only votes to break ties. The vice governor is elected via the plurality voting system province-wide.

The districts used in appropriation of members is coextensive with the legislative districts of La Union.

Aside from the regular members, the board also includes the provincial federation presidents of the Liga ng mga Barangay (ABC, from its old name "Association of Barangay Captains"), the Sangguniang Kabataan (SK, youth councils) and the Philippine Councilors League (PCL).

== Apportionment ==
Elections	Seats per district		Ex officio seats	Reserved seats	Total seats
Elections	1st	2nd	Ex officio seats	Reserved seats	Total seats
2010–2024	5	5	3	0	13
2024–present	5	5	3	1	14

== List of members ==
=== Current members ===
These are the members after the 2025 Philippine general election:

- Vice Governor: Eric O. Sibuma (Lakas)

Seat	Board member	Party	Start of term	End of term
1st district	Maria Rosario Eufrosina P. Nisce	Lakas	June 30, 2022	June 30, 2028
1st district	Miguel Corleone B. Magsaysay	Independent	June 30, 2025	June 30, 2028
1st district	Gerard G. Ostrea	Lakas	June 30, 2022	June 30, 2028
1st district	Aaron Kyle M. Pinzon	Lakas	June 30, 2025	June 30, 2028
1st district	Ernesto V. Rafon	Independent	June 30, 2022	June 30, 2028
2nd district	Alyssa Kristine B. Sibuma	Lakas	June 30, 2025	June 30, 2028
2nd district	Teresita O. Garcia	Lakas	June 30, 2025	June 30, 2028
2nd district	Eulogio Clarence Martin P. De Guzman III	Lakas	June 30, 2025	June 30, 2028
2nd district	Ruperto Rillera Jr.	Lakas	June 30, 2022	June 30, 2028
2nd district	Jefferson B. Fernando	Lakas	June 30, 2025	June 30, 2028
ABC	Ramon Guio Ortega Jr.	Nonpartisan	January 1, 2023	January 1, 2028
PCL	Pablo C. Ortega	NPC	June 30, 2022	June 30, 2025
SK	Harold Dave Sibuma	Nonpartisan	January 1, 2023	January 1, 2028
IPMR	Joyce Abuan	Nonpartisan	July 1, 2024	July 1, 2027

Notes:

- Rachel Pinzon is later replaced/represented by Aaron Kyle Pinzon due to health concerns
- Pablo Ortega filed his candidacy for councilor to replace his late brother, Councilor Ramon “Monetskie” Ortega, who died due to heart ailments.

=== Vice governor ===
Election year	Name	Party	Ref.
2016	Aureo Agusto Q. Nisce	Lakas	
2019	Mario Eduardo C. Ortega	NUP	
2022	Mario Eduardo C. Ortega	Independent	
2025	Eric O. Sibuma	Lakas	

=== 1st district ===
- Population (2024):

Election year	Member (party)	Member (party)	Member (party)	Member (party)	Member (party)	Ref.
2016	Francisco C. Ortega, Jr. (NPC)	Jonathan Justo A. Orros (NPC)	Gary N. Pinzon (NPC)	Reynaldo M. Mosuela (PDP–Laban)	Carlo Castor U. Concepcion (NPC)	
2019	Francisco Paolo P. Ortega, V (NPC)	Jonathan Justo A. Orros (NPC)	Gary N. Pinzon (PDP–Laban)	Jennifer C. Mosuela (PDP–Laban)	Gerard C. Ostrea (PFP)	
2022	Maria Rosario Eufrosina P. Nisce (NPC)	Geraldine Joy R. Ortega (Nacionalista)	Rachel N. Pinzon (Lakas)	Jennifer C. Mosuela-Fernandez (NPC)	Gerard C. Ostrea (PFP)	
2025	Maria Rosario Eufrosina P. Nisce (Lakas)	Miguel Corleone B. Magsaysay (Independent)	Aaron Kyle M. Pinzon (Lakas)	Ernesto V. Rafon (Independent)	Gerard C. Ostrea (Lakas)	

=== 2nd district ===
- Population (2024):

Election year	Member (party)	Member (party)	Member (party)	Member (party)	Member (party)	Ref.
2016	Maria Annabelle S. De Guzman (UNA)	Christian I. Rivera (NPC)	Ruperto Rillera, Jr. (UNA)	Nancy Corazon M. Bacurnay (Liberal)	Bellarmin A. Flores, II (Liberal)	
2019	Maria Annabelle S. De Guzman (NPC)	Christian I. Rivera (PDP–Laban)	Frank O. Sibuma (NPC)	Nancy Corazon M. Bacurnay (Liberal)	Abraham P. Rimando (PDP–Laban)	
2022	Maria Annabelle S. De Guzman (NPC)	Henry B. Balbin (Lakas)	Ruperto Rillera, Jr. (NPC)	Cynthia Angelica M. Bacurnay (Liberal)	Victor I. Rivera (NPC)	
2025	Alyssa Kristine B. Sibum (Lakas)	Teresita O. Garcia (Lakas)	Ruperto Rillera, Jr. (Lakas)	Eulogio Clarence Martin P. De Guzman, III (Lakas)	Jefferson B. Fernando (Lakas)	
