= Mario Eduardo Ortega =

Filipino politician (born 1956)

Mario Eduardo C. Ortega
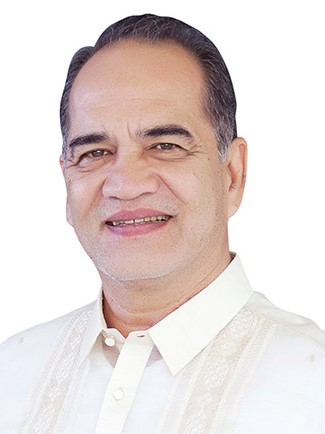

29th Governor of La Union
- Incumbent
- Assumed office June 30, 2025
- Vice Governor: Eric Sibuma
- Preceded by: Raphaelle Ortega-David

11th Vice Governor of La Union
- In office June 30, 2019 – June 30, 2025
- Governor: Francisco Ortega III (2019-2022); Raphaelle Ortega-David (2022-2025)
- Preceded by: Aureo Nisce
- Succeeded by: Eric Sibuma

Personal details
- Born: February 3, 1956 (age 70) San Fernando, La Union, Philippines
- Party: PFP (2024–present)
- Other political affiliations: Independent (2021–2024); NUP (2018–2021)
- Relations: Ortega family
- Relatives: Victor Ortega (brother); Bobby Ortega (brother)

Mario Eduardo Campos Ortega (born February 3, 1956) is a Filipino politician serving as the Governor of the Province of La Union since 2025. Prior to becoming Governor, he was Vice Governor of La Union from 2019 to 2022 under Governor Francisco Ortega III, and again from 2022 to 2025 under Governor Raphaelle Ortega-David. He defeated Raphaelle, his grandniece, in the 2025 Philippine gubernatorial elections.
