= Manuel Ortega (painter) =

Spanish painter (1921–2014)

Manuel Ortega Pérez de Monforte (9 July 1921 – 14 April 2014) was a Spanish painter, muralist, sculptor, designer, portrait painter, and engraver. He was born in Madrid.

Ortega created more than 200 murals and created stained glass in many cathedrals, seminaries, palaces, hotels and developments from Spain. He won the international competition for the windows of the Cathedral of Almudena in Madrid in 1998.

Ortega died in Madrid from natural causes, aged 92.
