= Raphaelle Ortega-David =

Filipino politician (born 1997)

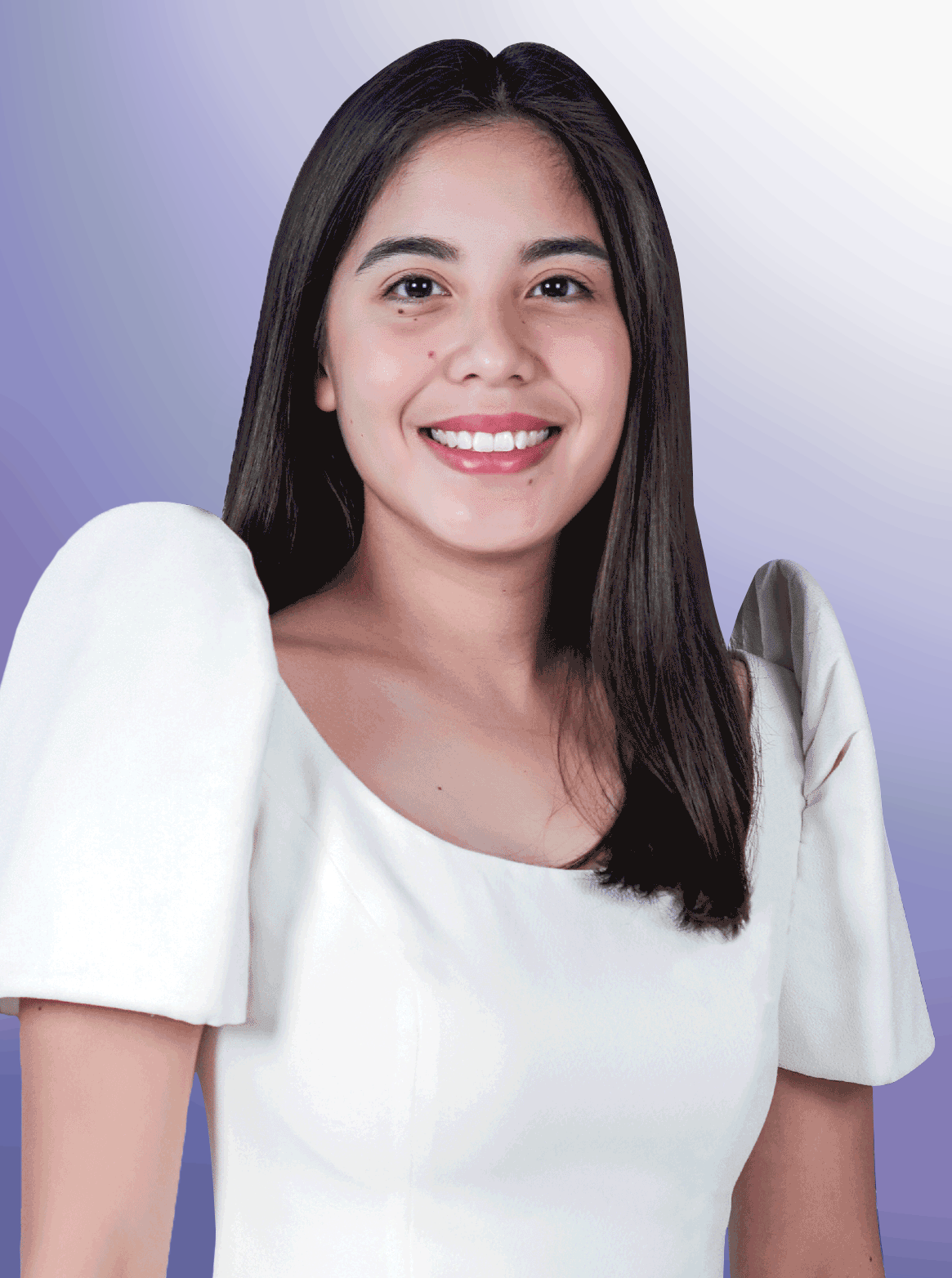

28th Governor of La Union
- In office June 30, 2022 – June 30, 2025
- Vice Governor: Mario Eduardo Ortega
- Preceded by: Francisco Ortega III
- Succeeded by: Mario Eduardo Ortega

Personal details
- Born: Raphaelle Veronica Alviar Ortega; March 14, 1997 (age 29) San Fernando, La Union, Philippines
- Party: NPC (2024–present)
- Other political affiliations: PDDS (2021–2024)
- Spouse: Kevin David (m. 2021)
- Relations: Ortega family
- Parents: Francisco Ortega III (father); Vini Alviar (mother)
- Education: Enderun Colleges
- Occupation: Politician

Raphaelle "Rafy" Veronica Alviar Ortega-David (born March 14, 1997) is a Filipino politician who was Governor of the Province of La Union from 2022 to 2025.

== Career ==
Ortega-David became the first female governor of La Union when she won the 2022 gubernatorial election. She succeeded her father Francisco Ortega III for the position. Her father was supposed to launch a reelection bid but withdrew his candidacy. Ortega-David substituted her father's candidacy. She lost reelection in the 2025 gubernatorial election to her granduncle, Vice Governor Mario Eduardo Ortega.

== Personal life ==
She is married to Kevin David.
