= Armando Ortega =

Mexican musician

Musician Armando Manuel Aurelio Ortega Carrillo
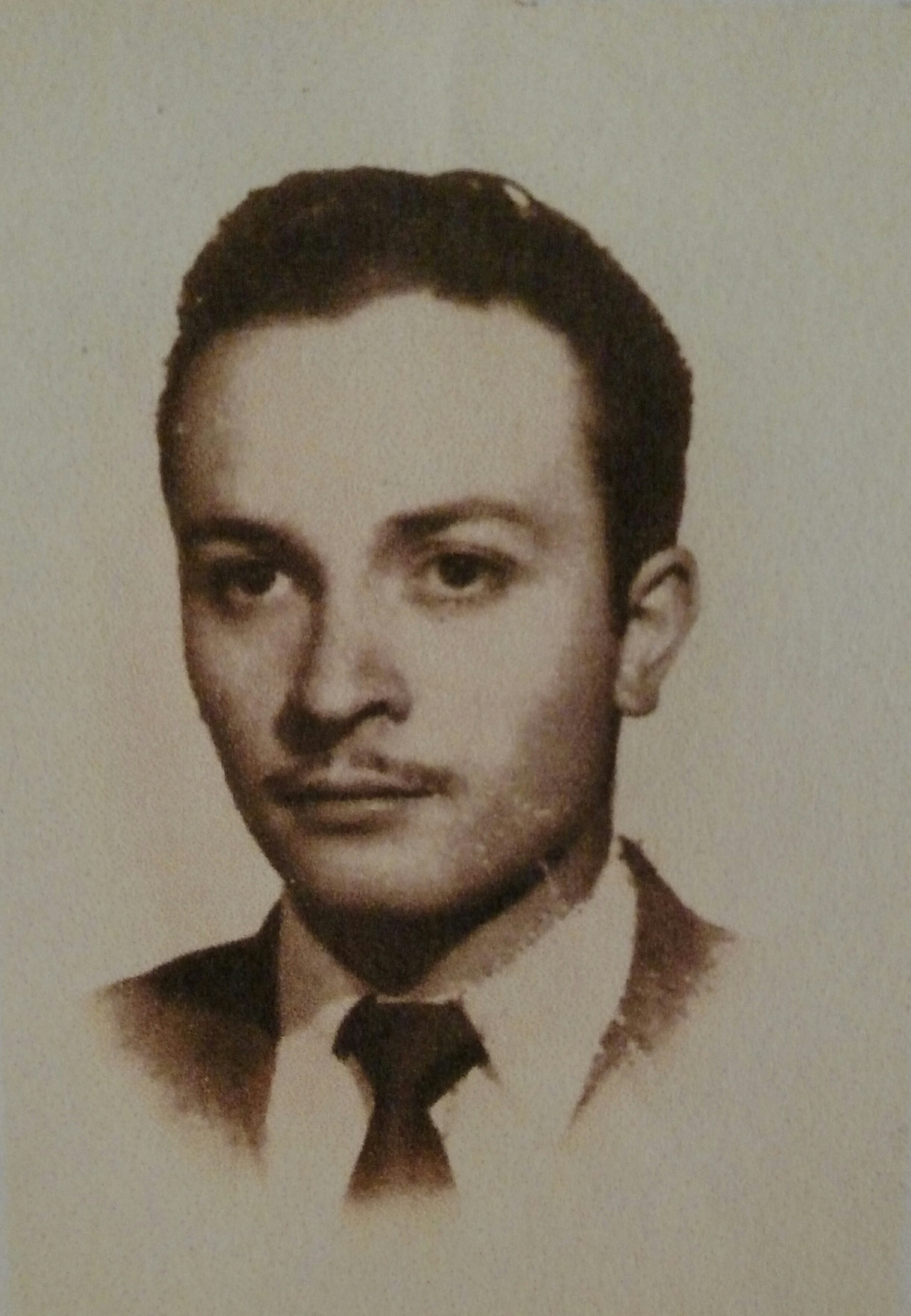
- Born: Mexico City, Mexico
- Died: September 1973; Orizaba, Veracruz, Mexico
- Spouse: Fabiola Peláez Pérez
- Parent(s): Aurelio Ortega Castañeda and Guadalupe María Carrillo Limón

Armando Manuel Aurelio Ortega Carrillo, known as Maestro Armando Ortega, was a Mexican musician, the Director of Coro de la Escuela Secundaria y de Bachilleres de Orizaba (ESBO).

== Early life ==
Armando Manuel Aurelio Ortega Carrillo was born into a wealthy family. From a young age he exhibited enormous artistic and musical talent. As his talents became known, he went to study with the Jesuit Fathers in nearby Puebla and then at a boarding school in San Luis Potosí, and then in Mexico City with the Marist Fathers. Part of his formation also included studying under Ramón Noble and Uberto Zanolli. He wrote poems on the valley of Orizaba, and was often sought out to compose some for important events and ceremonies.

== Career ==
A large collection of his works have been donated to the City of Orizaba and are housed in the Archives of the city's Cultural Center.

Maestro Armando Aurelio was also known for his drawings and paintings of Orizaba, Veracruz. His father, the poet and teacher Don Aurelio Ortega Castañeda was an influence on Maestro Armando.

On the 13 of August 2008 he was honored for his contributions to Mexican culture and the arts at the Teatro de la Llave in Orizaba, Veracruz, Mexico.

== Death ==
Maestro Armando died at the age of 36. His faithful mother, Doña Guadalupe María Carrillo Limón viuda de Ortega and niece Norma Alicia María Arenas Ortega, were at his bedside when he died. He was reentered in the city's cemetery, in the family plot in 2008, following a citywide ceremonial event.
