= 1st Congress of the Commonwealth of the Philippines =

17th legislative term of the Philippines

←	National Assembly (Second Republic)	1st Congress	→
- Old Legislative Building (c. 1988)

Overview
- Term: June 9 – December 20, 1945
- President: Sergio Osmeña

Senate
- Members: 24
- President: Manuel Roxas
- President pro tempore: Elpidio Quirino
- Majority leader: Melecio Arranz

House of Representatives
- Members: 98
- Speaker: Jose Zulueta
- Speaker pro tempore: Prospero Sanidad
- Majority leader: Eugenio Perez

The 1st Congress of the Commonwealth of the Philippines (Filipino: Unang Kongreso ng Komenwelt ng Pilipinas), also known as the Postwar Congress, and the Liberation Congress, refers to the meeting of the bicameral legislature composed of the Senate and House of Representatives, from 1945 to 1946. The meeting only convened after the reestablishment of the Commonwealth of the Philippines in 1945 when President Sergio Osmeña called it to hold five special sessions. Osmeña had replaced Manuel L. Quezon as president after the former died in exile in the United States in 1944.

== Significance ==
Not much has been written about the First Commonwealth Congress, despite its historical and political significance. This owes mainly to the briefness of its existence (i.e., less than a year). However, the First Commonwealth Congress was significant in at least three key respects:

First, it brought an end the president's exercise of legislative powers under the wartime emergency act passed by the defunct National Assembly in 1941. The opening of Congress in 1945 allowed democratically elected representatives to pass legislation, especially to deal with the Philippines' postwar problems. It also provided an institutional check against executive power, including the presidential power to appoint top officials of the (postwar) government and appropriate funds for its operations.

Second, the First Commonwealth Congress gave birth to the two-party system in the Philippines, as the pro-Osmeña and pro-Roxas blocs or factions there eventually became the Nacionalista and Liberal Parties that alternated in power from 1945 until martial law was imposed in 1972. This Congress thus served as a well spring of political leaders under a two-party system of the soon-to-be independent Republic of the Philippines. Three Philippine presidents, Manuel Roxas, Elpidio Quirino and Carlos P. Garcia were members of this Congress, as were postwar political party leaders like Senate President Eulogio Rodriguez, Speaker Eugenio Pérez, Senator Jose E. Romero and Senator Melecio Arranz. The patron-client orientation of the two-party system evolved in part from the resource constraints faced by members of the Congress right after the war.

Third, it was this Congress laid down much of the groundwork for the country's postwar reconstruction and rehabilitation, including its participation in the postwar global economic order dominated by the United States.

== Background ==
Through the most part of the term of the Second National Assembly (1938–1941), the First Congress' immediate predecessor, international conflicts that led to World War II began to take shape. As early as 1940, the National Assembly already declared a state of national emergency to address the escalating emergency conditions of the times. It gave Philippine President Manuel L. Quezon extensive emergency powers to meet the worsening conditions. All preparations culminated when Japan attacked the Philippines a few hours after bombing Pearl Harbor on December 8, 1941. The National Assembly lost no time in enacting substantive legislations, diverting all remaining funds for national defense purposes, and declaring a state of total emergency. It furthered the broad emergency powers already granted to the President, such as the transfer of the seat of government and the extension of the effectivity of lapsing laws.

In its last act as a legislative body, the National Assembly certified the results of the November 1941 elections where Quezon and Osmeña were re-elected as president and vice president, respectively, along with the legislators who were to compose the First Commonwealth Congress. The Congress replaced the unicameral National Assembly as the legislative branch of government. It was due to meet for the first time in January 1942 had the war not intervene.

Due to the transfer of the Philippine Government to Washington, D.C. in 1942, and the three-year occupation (1942–1945) of the Philippines by Japanese forces, the First Congress could not be convened. In its place, the Japanese formed a puppet National Assembly that passed laws dictated by the Japanese Imperial Government in Tokyo.

The Japanese-sponsored Philippine Republic, under José P. Laurel as president, ended in late February 1945 when the Philippines was liberated by the returning American forces in the Pacific.

== Reestablishment of Commonwealth Government ==
Upon the reestablishment of the Philippine Commonwealth in Manila in 1945, General Douglas MacArthur exerted political pressure on President Sergio Osmeña to convene Congress in formal session. Osmeña was reluctant to do so not only because of the huge expense associated with the functioning of Congress, but more so because he feared that its two houses would be controlled by legislators who had collaborated with the Japanese when the Philippine Government was in exile in Washington, D.C.

On May 24, 1945, Osmeña offered Roxas the position of Resident Commissioner to the U.S. Roxas by then was known to be actively seeking the right opportunity to launch his presidential ambition with the backing of General Douglas MacArthur, Quezon's former military adviser and considered as the "Liberator of the Philippines." Two days later, Roxas declined Osmeña's offer and instead asked his supporters to announce his candidacy for president at a time when there was no designated date to hold a national election. The First Commonwealth Congress thus provided the vehicle for Roxas' primacy in Philippine postwar politics and government. It also paved the way for the permanent division of the old Nacionalista Party into two warring factions. Its so-called Liberal Wing or faction (later Liberal Party) nominated Roxas for the presidency in 1946.

== The First Commonwealth Congress Convened ==
In late May 1945, President Osmeña was persuaded to call the First Commonwealth Congress to special session in order to tackle the most pressing issues of postwar rehabilitation and regain constitutional normalcy. Regular sessions could not be held by then, as the Constitution provided that these should take place for 100 days beginning on the fourth Monday of January of each year.

With the old Legislative Building in ruins, the First Commonwealth Congress met in a former Japanese schoolhouse located at 949 Lepanto Street, Manila, two blocks from the headquarters of Gota de Leche. Most senators and congressmen could not hold office there due to limited space and facilities, which were allotted to the officers of the two chambers and the congressional staff. The Senate and the House of Representatives shared the same session hall (the school's former auditorium), with the Senate meeting in the morning and the House using the hall in the evening. However, the Senate held office at 128 Legarda Street, which was about two blocks away from the Lepanto street schoolhouse. The Senate eventually took temporary quarters in the badly damaged Manila City Hall in 1947. The House remained at Lepanto Street until it moved, with the Senate, to the newly rebuilt Congress building in 1950.

At the first special session of Congress on June 9, 1945, Senators Manuel Roxas and Elpidio Quirino were elected as Senate President and Senate President Pro-Tempore, respectively. The House of Representatives elected for its Speaker Iloilo Rep. Jose C. Zulueta and for Speaker Pro-Tempore, Pangasinan Rep. Prospero Sanidad. Only 16 out of 24 senators and 75 of 98 congressmen, who were elected in 1941, attended the five special sessions called by the President. In the Senate alone, Senator Daniel Maramba had died of natural causes immediately before the outbreak of World War II. Senator José Ozámiz was executed by the Japanese. Senators Antonio de las Alas, Vicente Madrigal, Quintin Paredes, Claro M. Recto, Proceso E. Sebastian, Emiliano T. Tirona and José Yulo were arrested by the US Army's Counter-Intelligence Corps (CIC) because they had worked in various capacities under the Japanese-sponsored Philippine Government. Alas, Madrigal, Paredes, Recto, Sebastian, Tirona and Yulo had been part of Laurel's Cabinet. The Senate held a lottery to determine who among its members would serve up to April 1946 and November 1947, since senators serve staggered terms under the Constitution.

The First Commonwealth Congress initially convened with 14 senators and 66 congressmen. Two more senators reported and nine congressmen joined their colleagues in later sessions. Among the members of the First Commonwealth Congress was Representative Elisa Ochoa from Agusan, the first woman ever elected to the Philippine national legislature.

The two chambers of Congress assembled in joint session in the afternoon of June 9, 1945, to hear President Osmeña deliver his state of the nation address. Osmeña expectedly dealt with several proposed legislation to rebuild the financial infrastructure of the Philippines and restore government institutions. He also tried to address issues concerning the terms of office of officials elected in 1941 just before the Japanese invasion. Because of the severe damage caused to property by the war, the legislators who were hurriedly called to Manila in June 1945, including Roxas and Quirino, had no appropriate attire for the congressional sessions other than their army khaki uniforms. President Osmeña ordered two pairs of sharkskin suits to be purchased by the government (from the Manlapat tailoring shop across the temporary Congress building) for each of the legislators around the time of the opening of Congress.

A few foreign dignitaries also addressed the joint session in the next six months. This included U.S. High Commissioner Paul V. McNutt and General MacArthur who received a commendation from the Congress and a second resolution making him an honorary citizen of the Philippines. In his memorable address before its joint session on July 9, 1945, MacArthur said:

"Since the beginning of the time men have crusaded for freedom and for equality. It was this passion for liberty which inspired the architects of my own government to proclaim so immutably and so beautifully that 'all men are created equal' and 'that they are endowed by their Creator with certain inalienable rights that among these are Life, Liberty, and the pursuit of Happiness.' On such rights rest our basic concept of human freedom, in defense of which we have fought and still continue to fight on the battlefields of the world. These rights are the very antithesis to the totalitarian doctrine which seeks to regiment the people and control the human will as the price for presumed efficiency in government."

== Accomplishments and Controversies ==
The First Commonwealth Congress passed a total of 55 laws in five special sessions: Commonwealth Act Nos. 672 to 727.

Heeding Osmeña's urgent call during the opening session of Congress, the first legislative measure it enacted was Commonwealth Act No. 672 which restored the Philippine National Bank and organized its financial capital. The viability of the Philippine National Bank was critical to the resuscitation of the Philippine Commonwealth after the war.

One major financial legislation passed by Congress stirred controversy in the U.S. and was eventually vetoed by President Harry Truman despite its approval by President Osmeña. Commonwealth House Bill No. 647 (Senate Bill No. 51), titled "An Act Governing the Payment of Monetary Obligations Incurred or Contracted Prior to and During the Japanese Invasion of the Philippines and for Other Purposes", was passed by both houses of Congress on the last day of its last session, December 20, 1945. It was signed into law by President Osmeña on January 18, 1946. The law provided for the validation of payments made in Japanese "mickey mouse" money during the period of enemy occupation. However, U.S. High Commissioner McNutt objected to it and asked Truman to exercise his final veto on this currency measure. President Truman's accompanying veto letter explained his disapproval, to wit:

"The Commonwealth Act which I am now disapproving would give legal approval to transactions and payments made under the brutal Japanese regime, without regard for the actual value of the Japanese-backed currency in which such payments were made. It would give official sanction to acts by Japanese officials in forcing the liquidation of businesses and accounts of loyal Filipinos, Americans, and allies who were imprisoned by the Japanese. It would have a most harmful effect on the Philippine financial structure which it is our hope and desire to see strengthened in preparation for independence. It would work to the benefit of persons who did business with and under the Japanese to the prejudice of those who were loyal both to the Philippine Commonwealth and to the United States Government."

The First Commonwealth Congress also tackled the most contentious and divisive issue of Filipino collaboration with the Japanese. Osmeña had proposed a bill to set up a special court for this purpose. Roxas initially objected to it, fearing the loss of critical support from his political allies who were accused of, or imprisoned for, collaboration. After extensive congressional debates, Commonwealth Act No. 682 was passed in August 1945 creating the People's Court and the Office of Special Prosecutors to investigate and decide on collaboration charges on an individual basis. In September 1945, the CIC presented the Filipinos who were accused of having collaborated with, or given aid to, the Japanese so that they may be tried before the People's Court. Included were prominent senators and congressmen who had been active in the puppet government under Laurel. These legislators were unable to attend the five special sessions of the First Commonwealth Congress.

The collaboration issue continued to haunt Congress. Another currency-related legislation passed by the First Commonwealth Congress was held up for a few weeks at the White House before President Truman signed it into law in November 1945. As Truman noted in his letter to President Osmeña, his approval of the original House Bill No. 176, which provides for a reduction of the required gold coverage of Philippine currency, has been delayed "due to the fact that there have been persistent charges that a sizable fraction of the Members of the Philippine Congress had been guilty of collaboration with the enemy, and I have not wanted my approval of the act to be distorted into approval of collaboration."

The so-called Backpay Law of 1945 turned out to be the most controversial measure passed by the postwar Congress. Joint Resolution No. 5 authorized the Philippine Treasury, which was already financially crippled, to pay back salaries and wages to members of Congress and their staff to cover the three years of Japanese occupation. In effect, the Backpay Law compensated the legislators for service that they never rendered during the war years. The passage of this measure was met with public indignation. It led to a political backlash and many members of Congress lost their seats during the national elections held in April 1946.

Several key measures were passed concerning postwar relations between the Philippines and the United States and the Philippine government's participation in the postwar global politico-economic system led by the United States. Joint Resolution No. 4, signed into law by President Osmeña on July 28, 1945, authorized the President of the Philippines to negotiate with the President of the United States the establishment in the Philippines of military bases "to insure the territorial integrity of the Philippines, the mutual protection of the Philippines and the United States, and the maintenance of peace in the Pacific." Another joint resolution was passed by Congress for the establishment of free trade between the United States following the recommendations of the Bell Trade Mission, which President Osmeña himself supported and endorsed. This became the foundation of the controversial Bell Trade Act of 1946.

In October 1945, President Osmeña also signed House Bill No. 608. This legislation authorized the participation of the Philippine Commonwealth Government in the International Monetary Fund and the World Bank system following the Bretton-Woods Conference in July 1944.

Finally, it was during this historic Congress that the Philippine Senate first exercised its constitutional authority to ratify treaties and other international agreements with its unanimous ratification on August 30, 1945, of the Charter of the newly formed United Nations. President Osmeña appeared before the Senate three days earlier to deliver the Charter and ask for its ratification.

== Postwar Factionalism in Congress ==
The political rivalry between Osmeña and Roxas, and their respective supporters, began in late May 1945 or even before the Congress opened its first session. After Congress convened, it became apparent that the Roxas bloc (later known as the Liberal Wing of the Nacionalista Party) would in due time separate from the ruling Nacionalista Party led by Osmeña. Hence, Osmeña's allies, particularly in the House of Representatives and the Cabinet, exerted every effort to prevent Roxas from using the Congress as his base of political support during the Liberation period. For example, the Congressional Record of June 11–13, 1945 reports the deliberations in the House of Representatives over Osmeña's Interior Secretary, Tomas Confesor, assertion in the local press that Congress was illegally convened for many reasons, including the expired term of one-third of the senators elected in 1941. Later, Cebu congressman Pedro Lopez and Senator Carlos P. Garcia took to the floor of their respective chambers to denounce the so-called wartime collaborators in Congress led by Roxas, leading to fiery debates over the collaboration issue and the legality of having sitting members of Congress who were accused of collaboration or under investigation therefor. Subsequently, congressmen like Nueva Vizcaya's Leon Cabarroguis sought to petition the United States to immediately disband Congress and call for elections or to convert Congress into an advisory panel to the President (Osmeña) to bypass these legal challenges to its existence and operation after the war.

The Osmeña-Roxas rivalry intensified in the Commission on Appointments — a congressional body consisting of 12 senators and 12 congressmen — which was responsible for confirming presidential nominations. The Commission was chaired by Roxas himself as senate president. In that powerful position, Roxas managed to sit on (bypass) the nominations of some of Osmeña's most important political advisers and supporters. The Commission also confirmed Osmeña's nominations for chief justice and associate justices of the Supreme Court, except for one, Justice Jose A. Espiritu, whose credentials were questioned before the Commission. Espiritu became the shortest-serving member of the Supreme Court. He returned as dean of the U.P. College of Law in September 1945, after serving in an ad interim capacity as associate justice for only two months.

The heat of presidential politics further divided loyalties in the postwar Congress, as its members failed to decide on the date of elections for president, vice-president, 16 senators and 98 congressmen as well as certain electoral provisions (e.g., whether to allow soldiers to vote). President Osmeña thus requested the U.S. Congress to intervene and set the date of the first post-war elections. The U.S. Congress, in a joint resolution issued in November 1945, called for national elections to take place no later than April 30, 1946, and for the Second Congress to convene not later than May 28, 1946. On December 20, 1945, the First Commonwealth Congress met for the last time to discuss the April 1946 presidential elections—the first since 1941.

The 1946 elections catapulted the newly formed Liberal Party to power for the first time. Senate President Roxas and Senate President Pro Tempore Quirino, of the Liberal Party, were respectively elected as first President and Vice-President of the Republic of the Philippines, which gained independence from the U.S. on July 4, 1946. Erstwhile Senate Floor Leader Melecio Arranz became President Pro Tempore of the Senate, while House of Representatives Majority Leader Eugenio Pérez became its Speaker when the new Congress convened in May 1946. Speaker Zulueta, on the other hand, joined the Roxas Cabinet as Secretary of the Interior and later ran and won as senator. Many other members of the First Commonwealth Congress held top positions in the newborn republic.

== Other Vital Legislation ==
- Commonwealth Act No. 672 – Rehabilitation of the Philippine National Bank
- Commonwealth Act No. 675 – Immediate Payment of the Salaries of Deceased Filipino Soldiers, Including Recognized Guerrillas
- Commonwealth Act No. 676 – Authorization of the Advance Bonus Payment for the Three-Month Salaries of Government Officials and Employees
- Commonwealth Act No. 678 – Determination of the Staggered Terms of Office of Senators Elected in 1941
- Commonwealth Act No. 681 – Rehabilitation of the Philippine Anti-Tuberculosis Society
- Commonwealth Act No. 682 – Creating the People's Court and Office of Special Prosecutors
- Commonwealth Act No. 683 – Creating the Office of Foreign Relations (precursor of the Department of Foreign Affairs)
- Commonwealth Act No. 686 – Advance Bonus to Public School Teachers and Low-Salaried Government Employees
- Commonwealth Act No. 687 – Creating the Province of Catanduanes
- Commonwealth Act No. 689 – Penalizing Illegal Increase of Rentals for Dwelling Purposes
- Commonwealth Act No. 693 – Providing for the Lifetime Pension of Mrs. Aurora A. Quezon
- Commonwealth Act No. 699 – Authorization of Membership of the Philippines in the Newly-Created International Monetary Fund (IMF) and International Bank for Reconstruction and Development (World Bank)
- Commonwealth Act No. 715 – Creation of the Commission on Reparations
- Commonwealth Act No. 716 – Creation of the Philippine Relief and Rehabilitation Administration
- Commonwealth Act No. 725 – Providing for the Election of President, Vice-President, Senators and Members of the House of Representatives (the last under the Commonwealth)

== Sessions ==
- First Special Session: June 9 – July 13, 1945 (30 session days)
- Second Special Session: August 14 – September 17, 1945 (30 session days)
- Third Special Session: September 22 – October 3, 1945 (10 session days)
- Fourth Special Session: December 6 – 12, 1945 (6 session days)
- Fifth Special Session: December 13 – 20, 1945 (7 session days)

== Leadership ==
=== Senate ===
Senate President

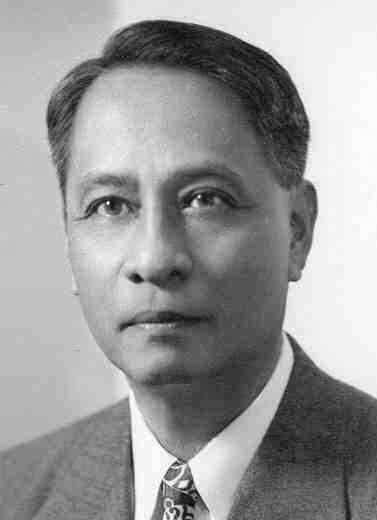
Manuel Roxas

- President: Manuel Roxas (Nacionalista)
- President pro tempore: Elpidio Quirino (Nacionalista)
- Majority Floor Leader: Melecio Arranz (Nacionalista)

=== House of Representatives ===
House Speaker

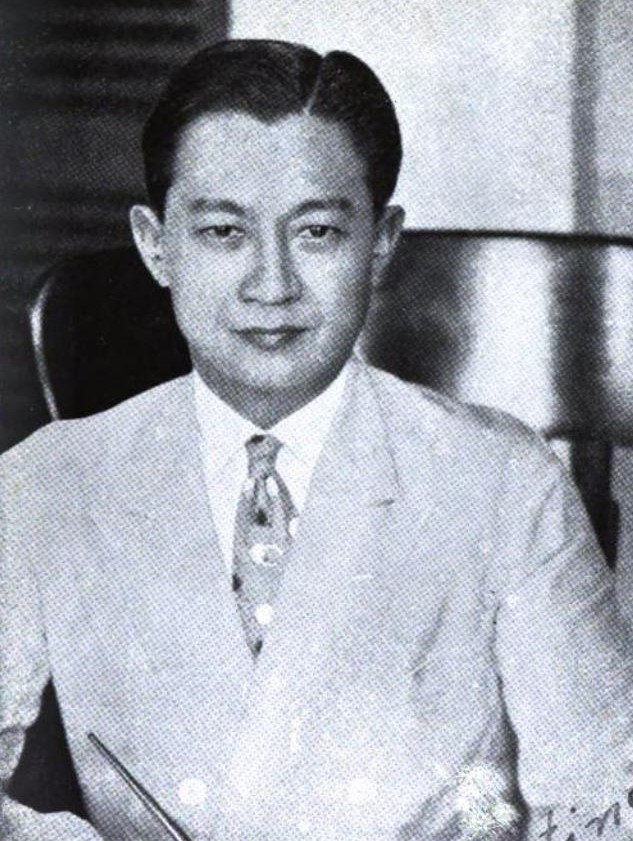
Jose Zulueta

- Speaker: Jose Zulueta (Iloilo–1st, Nacionalista)
- Speaker pro tempore: Prospero Sanidad (Ilocos Sur–2nd, Nacionalista)
- Majority Floor Leader: Eugenio Perez (Pangasinan–2nd, Nacionalista)

== Members ==
=== Senate ===
All the senators of this Congress were elected on November 11, 1941, but, following the outbreak of World War II, were only able to take office on July 9, 1945. A lottery was held on August 23, 1945 to determine the senators elected to two, four and six-year terms. Senators selected for two and four-year terms had their terms end on May 25, 1946, while senators selected for six-year terms had their terms end on December 30, 1947.

Composition of the Senate during the 1st Congress of the Commonwealth.

Senator	Party	Term end
Antonio de las Alas	Nacionalista	1946
Alauya Alonto	Nacionalista	1947
Melecio Arranz	Nacionalista	1946
Nicolas Buendia	Nacionalista	1946
Mariano Jesus Cuenco	Nacionalista	1946
Esteban de la Rama	Nacionalista	1947
Ramon J. Fernandez	Nacionalista	1946
Carlos P. Garcia	Nacionalista	1946
Pedro Hernaez	Nacionalista	1947
Domingo Imperial	Nacionalista	1946
Vicente Madrigal	Nacionalista	1947
Daniel Maramba (Note: Daniel Maramba died on December 28, 1941.)	Nacionalista	1946
Rafael Martinez	Nacionalista	1946
José Ozámiz (Note: José Ozámiz was executed by Japanese forces on February 11, 1944.)	Nacionalista	1946
Quintin Paredes	Nacionalista	1946
Elpidio Quirino	Nacionalista	1946
Vicente Rama	Nacionalista	1947
Claro M. Recto	Nacionalista	1946
Eulogio Rodriguez	Nacionalista	1947
Manuel Roxas	Nacionalista	1946
Proceso Sebastian	Nacionalista	1947
Emiliano Tria Tirona	Nacionalista	1947
Ramon Torres	Nacionalista	1946
Jose Yulo	Nacionalista	1946

=== House of Representatives ===
Composition of the House of Representatives during the 1st Congress of the Commonwealth.

Province/City	District	Representative	Party
Abra	Lone	Jesus Paredes	Nacionalista
Agusan	Lone	Elisa Ochoa	Nacionalista
Albay	1st	Isabelo V. Binamira	Nacionalista
Albay	2nd	Jose S. Valenciano	Nacionalista
Albay	3rd	Marcial O. Rañola	Nacionalista
Albay	4th	Francisco A. Perfecto	Nacionalista
Antique	Lone	Emigdio Nietes	Nacionalista
Bataan	Lone	Antonio G. Llamas (Note: Antonio G. Llamas was killed in March 1945.)	Nacionalista
Batanes	Lone	Vicente Agan (Note: Vicente Agan died on June 30, 1943.)	Nacionalista
Batangas	1st	Miguel Tolentino	Nacionalista
Batangas	2nd	Eusebio Orense (Note: Eusebio Orense died on February 23, 1942.)	Nacionalista
Batangas	3rd	Jose Laurel Jr.	Nacionalista
Bohol	1st	Genaro Visarra	Nacionalista
Bohol	2nd	Olegario B. Clarin	Nacionalista
Bohol	3rd	Margarito E. Revilles	Nacionalista
Bukidnon	Lone	Manuel Fortich (Note: Manuel Fortich died on January 15, 1943.)	Nacionalista
Bulacan	1st	Leon Valencia (Note: Leon Valencia died before taking office.)	Nacionalista
Bulacan	2nd	Antonio Villarama	Nacionalista
Cagayan	1st	Nicanor Carag	Nacionalista
Cagayan	2nd	Miguel P. Pio	Nacionalista
Camarines Norte	Lone	Wenceslao Vinzons (Note: Wenceslao Vinzons was executed by Japanese forces on July 15, 1942.)	Young Philippines
Camarines Sur	1st	Jaime M. Reyes	Nacionalista
Camarines Sur	2nd	Jose Fuentebella	Nacionalista
Capiz	1st	Ramon A. Arnaldo	Nacionalista
Capiz	2nd	Cornelio Villareal	Nacionalista
Capiz	3rd	Juan M. Reyes (Note: Juan M. Reyes died in the sinking of the SS Corregidor on December 17, 1941.)	Nacionalista
Cavite	Lone	Justiniano Montano	Nacionalista
Cebu	1st	Celestino Rodriguez	Nacionalista
Cebu	2nd	Pedro Lopez	Nacionalista
Cebu	3rd	Maximino Noel	Nacionalista
Cebu	4th	Agustin Kintanar	Nacionalista
Cebu	5th	Miguel Cuenco	Nacionalista
Cebu	6th	Nicolas Rafols	Nacionalista
Cebu	7th	Jose V. Rodriguez	Nacionalista
Cotabato	Lone	Ugalingan Piang	Nacionalista
Davao	Lone	Juan Sarenas	Nacionalista
Ilocos Norte	1st	Vicente T. Lazo	Nacionalista
Ilocos Norte	2nd	Rubio Conrado	Nacionalista
Ilocos Sur	1st	Jesus Serrano	Nacionalista
Ilocos Sur	2nd	Prospero Sanidad	Nacionalista
Iloilo	1st	Jose Zulueta	Nacionalista
Iloilo	2nd	Oscar Ledesma	Nacionalista
Iloilo	3rd	Tiburcio Lutero	Nacionalista
Iloilo	4th	Ceferino de los Santos	Nacionalista
Iloilo	5th	Juan Borra	Nacionalista
Isabela	Lone	Lino J. Castillejos	Nacionalista
La Union	1st	Francisco Ortega	Nacionalista
La Union	2nd	Enrique Rimando	Nacionalista
Laguna	1st	Conrado M. Potenciano	Nacionalista
Laguna	2nd	Crisanto M. Guysayko (Note: Crisanto M. Guysayko died on May 26, 1945.)	Nacionalista
Lanao	Lone	Salvador T. Lluch	Nacionalista
Leyte	1st	Mateo Canonoy	Nacionalista
Leyte	2nd	Dominador Tan	Nacionalista
Leyte	3rd	Tomas Oppus	Nacionalista
Leyte	4th	Filomeno Montejo	Nacionalista
Leyte	5th	Jose Maria Veloso	Nacionalista
Manila	1st	Engracio Clemeña	Popular Front
Manila	2nd	Alfonso E. Mendoza	Radical
Marinduque	Lone	Cecilio A. Maneja	Nacionalista
Masbate	Lone	Emilio B. Espinosa	Nacionalista
Mindoro	Lone	Raul Leuterio	Nacionalista
Misamis Occidental	Lone	Eugenio Stuart del Rosario	Nacionalista
Misamis Oriental	Lone	Jose Artadi	Nacionalista
Mountain Province	1st	George K. Tait	Nacionalista
Mountain Province	2nd	Ramon P. Mitra	Nacionalista
Mountain Province	3rd	Gregorio Morrero	Nacionalista
Negros Occidental	1st	Enrique Magalona	Nacionalista
Negros Occidental	2nd	Aguedo Gonzaga	Nacionalista
Negros Occidental	3rd	Raymundo Vargas	Nacionalista
Negros Oriental	1st	Julian L. Teves	Nacionalista
Negros Oriental	2nd	Jose E. Romero	Nacionalista
Nueva Ecija	1st	Manuel V. Gallego	Nacionalista
Nueva Ecija	2nd	Gabriel Belmonte	Nacionalista
Nueva Vizcaya	Lone	Leon Cabarroguis	Nacionalista
Palawan	Lone	Sofronio Española	Nacionalista
Pampanga	1st	Eligio G. Lagman	Nacionalista
Pampanga	2nd	Jose P. Fausto	Nacionalista
Pangasinan	1st	Jose P. Bengzon	Nacionalista
Pangasinan	2nd	Eugenio Perez	Nacionalista
Pangasinan	3rd	Pascual Beltran	Nacionalista
Pangasinan	4th	Cipriano Primicias Sr.	Nacionalista
Pangasinan	5th	Narciso Ramos	Nacionalista
Rizal	1st	Francisco Sevilla	Nacionalista
Rizal	2nd	Emilio de la Paz	Nacionalista
Romblon	Lone	Leonardo Festin	Nacionalista
Samar	1st	Decoroso Rosales	Nacionalista
Samar	2nd	Pedro R. Arteche (Note: Pedro R. Arteche died before taking office.)	Nacionalista
Samar	3rd	Felix Opimo	Nacionalista
Sorsogon	1st	Norberto Roque	Nacionalista
Sorsogon	2nd	Teodoro de Vera	Nacionalista
Sulu	Lone	Ombra Amilbangsa	Nacionalista
Surigao	Lone	Ricardo Navarro	Nacionalista
Tarlac	1st	Jose Cojuangco	Nacionalista
Tarlac	2nd	Benigno Aquino Sr.	Nacionalista
Tayabas	1st	Pedro Insua	Nacionalista
Tayabas	2nd	Francisco Lavides	Nacionalista
Zambales	Lone	Valentin Afable	Nacionalista
Zamboanga	Lone	Matias Ranillo Sr.	Nacionalista

== See also ==
- Congress of the Philippines
- Senate of the Philippines
- House of Representatives of the Philippines
- 1941 Philippine general election
