= Cebu's 3rd congressional district =

Legislative district of the Philippines

- Constituency for the House of Representatives of the Philippines
- Boundary of Cebu's 3rd congressional district in Cebu

- Location of Cebu within the Philippines
- Province: Cebu
- Region: Central Visayas
- Population: 616,326 (2020)
- Electorate: 383,749 (2022)
- Major settlements: 7 LGUs: Cities; Toledo; Municipalities; Aloguinsan; Asturias; Balamban; Barili; Pinamungajan; Tuburan
- Area: 1,258.08 km^{2} (485.75 sq mi)

Current constituency
- Created: 1907
- Representative: Karen Garcia
- Political party: NUP; 1CEBU
- Congressional bloc: Majority

Cebu's 3rd congressional district is one of the seven congressional districts of the Philippines in the province of Cebu. It has been represented in the House of Representatives of the Philippines since 1916 and earlier in the Philippine Assembly from 1907 to 1916. The district consists of the city of Toledo and adjacent western municipalities of Aloguinsan, Asturias, Balamban, Barili, Pinamungajan and Tuburan since 1987. It is currently represented in the 20th Congress by Karen Garcia of the National Unity Party (NUP) and One Cebu (1CEBU).

Prior to its second dissolution in 1972, it consisted of the city of Talisay and the east-central municipalities of Carcar, Minglanilla, Naga, and San Fernando.

== Representation history ==
#	Image	Member	Term of office		Legislature	Party	Electoral history	Constituent LGUs
#	Image	Member	Start	End	Legislature	Party	Electoral history	Constituent LGUs
=== Cebu's 3rd district for the Philippine Assembly ===
District created January 9, 1907.
1		Filemón Sotto	October 16, 1907	October 16, 1916	1st	Nacionalista	Elected in 1907.	1907–1916; Carcar, Minglanilla, Naga, San Fernando, Talisay
1		Filemón Sotto	October 16, 1907	October 16, 1916	2nd	Nacionalista	Re-elected in 1909.	1907–1916; Carcar, Minglanilla, Naga, San Fernando, Talisay
1		Filemón Sotto	October 16, 1907	October 16, 1916	3rd	Nacionalista	Re-elected in 1912.	1907–1916; Carcar, Minglanilla, Naga, San Fernando, Talisay
=== Cebu's 3rd district for the House of Representatives of the Philippine Islands ===
2		Vicente Urgello	October 16, 1916	June 6, 1922	4th	Nacionalista	Elected in 1916.	1916–1935; Carcar, Minglanilla, Naga, San Fernando, Talisay
2		Vicente Urgello	October 16, 1916	June 6, 1922	5th	Nacionalista	Re-elected in 1919.	1916–1935; Carcar, Minglanilla, Naga, San Fernando, Talisay
3		Vicente Rama	June 6, 1922	June 5, 1928	6th	Demócrata	Elected in 1922.	1916–1935; Carcar, Minglanilla, Naga, San Fernando, Talisay
3		Vicente Rama	June 6, 1922	June 5, 1928	7th	Demócrata	Re-elected in 1925.	1916–1935; Carcar, Minglanilla, Naga, San Fernando, Talisay
4		Maximino Noel	June 5, 1928	June 5, 1934	8th	Nacionalista; Consolidado	Elected in 1928.	1916–1935; Carcar, Minglanilla, Naga, San Fernando, Talisay
4		Maximino Noel	June 5, 1928	June 5, 1934	9th	Nacionalista; Consolidado	Re-elected in 1931.	1916–1935; Carcar, Minglanilla, Naga, San Fernando, Talisay
(3)		Vicente Rama	June 5, 1934	September 16, 1935	10th	Nacionalista; Democrático	Elected in 1934.	1916–1935; Carcar, Minglanilla, Naga, San Fernando, Talisay
#	Image	Member	Term of office		National Assembly	Party	Electoral history	Constituent LGUs
#	Image	Member	Start	End	National Assembly	Party	Electoral history	Constituent LGUs
=== Cebu's 3rd district for the National Assembly (Commonwealth of the Philippines) ===
5		Agustín Kintanar	September 16, 1935	December 30, 1938	1st	Nacionalista; Democrático	Elected in 1935.	1935–1941; Carcar, Minglanilla, Naga, San Fernando, Talisay
(4)		Maximino Noel	December 30, 1938	December 30, 1941	2nd	Nacionalista	Elected in 1938.	1935–1941; Carcar, Minglanilla, Naga, San Fernando, Talisay
District dissolved into the two-seat Cebu's at-large district for the National Assembly (Second Philippine Republic).
#	Image	Member	Term of office		Common wealth Congress	Party	Electoral history	Constituent LGUs
#	Image	Member	Start	End	Common wealth Congress	Party	Electoral history	Constituent LGUs
=== Cebu's 3rd district for the House of Representatives of the Commonwealth of the Philippines ===
District re-created May 24, 1945.
(4)		Maximino Noel	June 9, 1945	May 25, 1946	1st	Nacionalista	Re-elected in 1941.	1945–1946; Carcar, Minglanilla, Naga, San Fernando, Talisay
#	Image	Member	Term of office		Congress	Party	Electoral history	Constituent LGUs
#	Image	Member	Start	End	Congress	Party	Electoral history	Constituent LGUs
=== Cebu's 3rd district for the House of Representatives of the Philippines ===
(4)		Maximino Noel	May 25, 1946	December 30, 1949	1st	Nacionalista	Re-elected in 1946.	1946–1972; Carcar, Minglanilla, Naga, San Fernando, Talisay
6		Primitivo Sato	December 30, 1949	December 30, 1953	2nd	Liberal	Elected in 1949.	1946–1972; Carcar, Minglanilla, Naga, San Fernando, Talisay
(4)		Maximino Noel	December 30, 1953	December 30, 1965	3rd	Nacionalista	Elected in 1953.	1946–1972; Carcar, Minglanilla, Naga, San Fernando, Talisay
(4)		Maximino Noel	December 30, 1953	December 30, 1965	4th	Nacionalista	Re-elected in 1957.	1946–1972; Carcar, Minglanilla, Naga, San Fernando, Talisay
(4)		Maximino Noel	December 30, 1953	December 30, 1965	5th	Nacionalista	Re-elected in 1961.	1946–1972; Carcar, Minglanilla, Naga, San Fernando, Talisay
7		Ernesto H. Bascón	December 30, 1965	December 30, 1969	6th	Liberal	Elected in 1965.	1946–1972; Carcar, Minglanilla, Naga, San Fernando, Talisay
8		Eduardo Gullas	December 30, 1969	September 23, 1972	7th	Nacionalista	Elected in 1969. Removed from office after imposition of martial law.	1946–1972; Carcar, Minglanilla, Naga, San Fernando, Talisay
District dissolved into the thirteen-seat Region VII's at-large district for the Interim Batasang Pambansa, followed by the six-seat Cebu's at-large district for the Regular Batasang Pambansa.
District re-created February 2, 1987.
9		Pablo P. Garcia	June 30, 1987	June 30, 1995	8th	Panaghiusa	Elected in 1987.	1987–present Aloguinsan, Asturias, Balamban, Barili, Pinamungajan, Toledo, Tuburan
9		Pablo P. Garcia	June 30, 1987	June 30, 1995	9th	Lakas	Re-elected in 1992.	1987–present Aloguinsan, Asturias, Balamban, Barili, Pinamungajan, Toledo, Tuburan
10		John Henry Osmeña	June 30, 1995	June 30, 1998	10th	LDP	Elected in 1995.	1987–present Aloguinsan, Asturias, Balamban, Barili, Pinamungajan, Toledo, Tuburan
11		Antonio P. Yapha Jr.	June 30, 1998	June 30, 2007	11th	NPC (Alayon)	Elected in 1998.	1987–present Aloguinsan, Asturias, Balamban, Barili, Pinamungajan, Toledo, Tuburan
11		Antonio P. Yapha Jr.	June 30, 1998	June 30, 2007	12th	NPC (Alayon)	Re-elected in 2001.	1987–present Aloguinsan, Asturias, Balamban, Barili, Pinamungajan, Toledo, Tuburan
11		Antonio P. Yapha Jr.	June 30, 1998	June 30, 2007	13th	NPC (Alayon)	Re-elected in 2004.	1987–present Aloguinsan, Asturias, Balamban, Barili, Pinamungajan, Toledo, Tuburan
12		Pablo John Garcia	June 30, 2007	June 30, 2013	14th	KAMPI (1CEBU)	Elected in 2007.	1987–present Aloguinsan, Asturias, Balamban, Barili, Pinamungajan, Toledo, Tuburan
12		Pablo John Garcia	June 30, 2007	June 30, 2013	14th	Lakas (1CEBU)	Elected in 2007.	1987–present Aloguinsan, Asturias, Balamban, Barili, Pinamungajan, Toledo, Tuburan
12		Pablo John Garcia	June 30, 2007	June 30, 2013	15th	NUP (1CEBU)	Re-elected in 2010.	1987–present Aloguinsan, Asturias, Balamban, Barili, Pinamungajan, Toledo, Tuburan
13		Gwendolyn Garcia	June 30, 2013	June 30, 2019	16th	UNA (1CEBU)	Elected in 2013.	1987–present Aloguinsan, Asturias, Balamban, Barili, Pinamungajan, Toledo, Tuburan
13		Gwendolyn Garcia	June 30, 2013	June 30, 2019	17th	PDP–Laban (1CEBU)	Re-elected in 2016.	1987–present Aloguinsan, Asturias, Balamban, Barili, Pinamungajan, Toledo, Tuburan
(12)		Pablo John Garcia	June 30, 2019	June 30, 2025	18th	PDP–Laban (1CEBU)	Elected in 2019.	1987–present Aloguinsan, Asturias, Balamban, Barili, Pinamungajan, Toledo, Tuburan
(12)		Pablo John Garcia	June 30, 2019	June 30, 2025	19th	NUP (1CEBU)	Re-elected in 2022.	1987–present Aloguinsan, Asturias, Balamban, Barili, Pinamungajan, Toledo, Tuburan
14		Karen Garcia	June 30, 2025	Incumbent	20th	NUP (1CEBU)	Elected in 2025.	1987–present Aloguinsan, Asturias, Balamban, Barili, Pinamungajan, Toledo, Tuburan

== Election results ==
=== 2025 ===
Candidate	Party	Votes	%
Karen Flores-Garcia	National Unity Party	155,730	100.00
Total		155,730	100.00
Valid votes		155,730	45.88
Invalid/blank votes		183,664	54.12
Total votes		339,394	100.00
Registered voters/turnout		397,831	85.31
National Unity Party hold			
Source: Commission on Elections

=== 2022 ===
2022 Philippine House of Representatives elections
Party	Candidate	Votes	%
NUP	Pablo John Garcia	201,530	100.00
Total votes		201,530	100.00
NUP hold			

=== 2019 ===
2019 Philippine House of Representatives elections
Party	Candidate	Votes	%
PDP–Laban	Pablo John Garcia	128,878	51.68
Independent	John Henry Osmeña	77,068	30.90
NPC	Geraldine Yapha	43,416	17.41
Total votes		249,362	100.00
PDP–Laban hold			

=== 2016 ===
2016 Philippine House of Representatives elections
Party	Candidate	Votes	%
UNA	Gwendolyn Garcia	139,923	62.20
Liberal	Grecilda Sanchez-Zaballero	82,830	36.82
Independent	Teodoro Osorio	2,206	0.98
Total votes		224,959	100.00
UNA hold			

=== 2013 ===
2013 Philippine House of Representatives elections
Party	Candidate	Votes	%
UNA	Gwendolyn Garcia	94,305	42.71
Liberal	Geraldine Yapha	89,952	40.74
Valid ballots		184,257	83.44
Invalid or blank votes		36,560	16.56
Total votes		220,817	100.00
UNA gain from NUP			

=== 2010 ===
2010 Philippine House of Representatives elections
Party	Candidate	Votes	%
Lakas–Kampi	Pablo John Garcia	127,730	55.09
Liberal	Antonio Yapha	79,604	34.34
Valid ballots		207,334	89.43
Invalid or blank votes		24,496	10.57
Total votes		231,830	100.00
Lakas–Kampi hold			

== See also ==
- Legislative districts of Cebu
