= Maximino Noel =

Filipino Visayan politician and longest-running congressman from Cebu, Philippines

The Honourable Maximino Jaen Noel
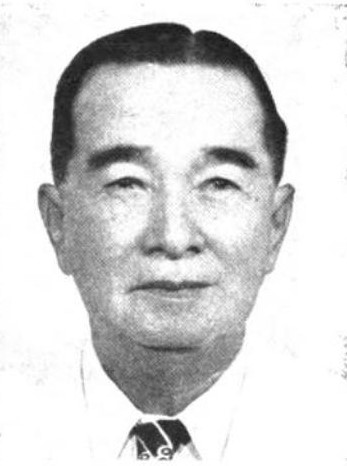
- Noel official portrait during the 3rd Congress.

Member of the Philippine House of Representatives from Cebu's 3rd district
- In office December 30, 1953 – December 30, 1965
- Preceded by: Primitivo Sato
- Succeeded by: Ernesto Bascón
- In office June 9, 1945 – December 30, 1949
- Preceded by: Himself (as member of the National Assembly)
- Succeeded by: Primitivo Sato
- In office June 5, 1928 – June 5, 1934
- Preceded by: Vicente Rama
- Succeeded by: Vicente Rama

Member of the Philippine National Assembly from Cebu's 3rd district
- In office December 30, 1938 – December 30, 1941
- Preceded by: Agustin Kintanar
- Succeeded by: Himself (as member of the House of Representatives)

Member of the Cebu Provincial Board from the 3rd district
- In office 1922–1925

Mayor of Carcar
- In office 1916–1922
- Preceded by: Mariano Noel

Member of the Carcar Municipal Council
- In office ?–1916

Personal details
- Born: Maximino Jaen Noel; May 29, 1879 Carcar, Cebu, Philippines
- Died: July 6, 1969 (aged 90)
- Party: Nacionalista
- Education: Liceo de Manila (Bcom)

Maximino Jaen Noel (May 29, 1879 – July 6, 1969) was a Filipino politician and the longest-serving congressman from Cebu, Philippines. Representing Cebu's 3rd district, he was a member of the House of Representatives from 1928 to 1934, 1945 to 1949 and 1953 to 1965. He was a member of the National Assembly from 1938 to 1941.

== Early life and education ==
Maximino Noel was born to parents Florencio Mercado Noel and Filomena Jaen in Carcar, Cebu on May 29, 1879. His father was the first municipal president (equivalent of mayor) of Carcar, and so was his brothers Vicente and Mariano who succeeded his father. He attended Liceo de Manila and took up Commerce. The ancestral house of the Noel family built in the mid-19th century was proclaimed a heritage house by Ambeth R. Ocampo, chairman of the National Historical Commission of the Philippines in May 2010.

== Career ==
Maximino, planter and businessman, was voted councilor in his hometown of Carcar, Cebu. Then he replaced Mariano when he was elected as mayor of Carcar in 1916 and served for six years. From 1922 to 1925, he became a member of the Cebu Provincial Board.

He was considered the longest-serving Congressman due to the length of his tenure representing Cebu's old 3rd legislative district, which was composed then of the municipalities of Talisay, Minglanilla, Naga, San Fernando, and Carcar. He was elected as member of the House of Representatives in 1928. Vicente Rama, his political rival to the position, published in his newspaper Bag-ong Kusog the story entitled Si Amar ug si Leon (Amar and Leon). Scholars believed the hero, Amar, represented Rama and the villain Leon, the political rival Noel. The exhumation of the remains of Leon Kilat, who was betrayed and killed in Carcar at the height of the Philippine Revolution, was also made into a political issue during that election.

Before World War II, he was one of the stockholders and original member of the Board of Directors of the now defunct National Rice and Corn Corporation by virtue of the executive order issued by then President Manuel L. Quezon.

In 1931, he won reelection and served for another term until 1934. He would run again 1938 as a member of the National Assembly. In 1941, he was voted again to the same office but served only in 1945 because of the outbreak of World War II. Moreover, he was voted to the same office in 1946.

In the 1949 elections, he was defeated by Primitivo Sato. However, Sato did not finish his term and was unseated as the House Electoral Tribunal ruled in favor of Maximino Noel's electoral protest that was promulgated by Enrique Medina in Electoral Case No. 42 on November 22, 1952.

He again won in the same elective post under Nacionalista Party and served from 1953 to 1965. During his term in Congress, he was a member of the Commission on Appointments, Vice Chairman of the Committee on Internal Government and Privileges, and a member of the Committee on Accounts.

== Historical commemoration ==
- The Rep. Maximino Noel (Guadalupe) National High School in Valladolid, Carcar, Cebu was named in his honor by virtue of Republic Act No. 8638 which was enacted on May 17, 1998.
- The Noel Boulevard in Talisay City, Cebu was also named after him by virtue of Municipal Council Resolution No. 70-89.
