= Plaza Sugbu =

Public square in Cebu City, Philippines

- Public square
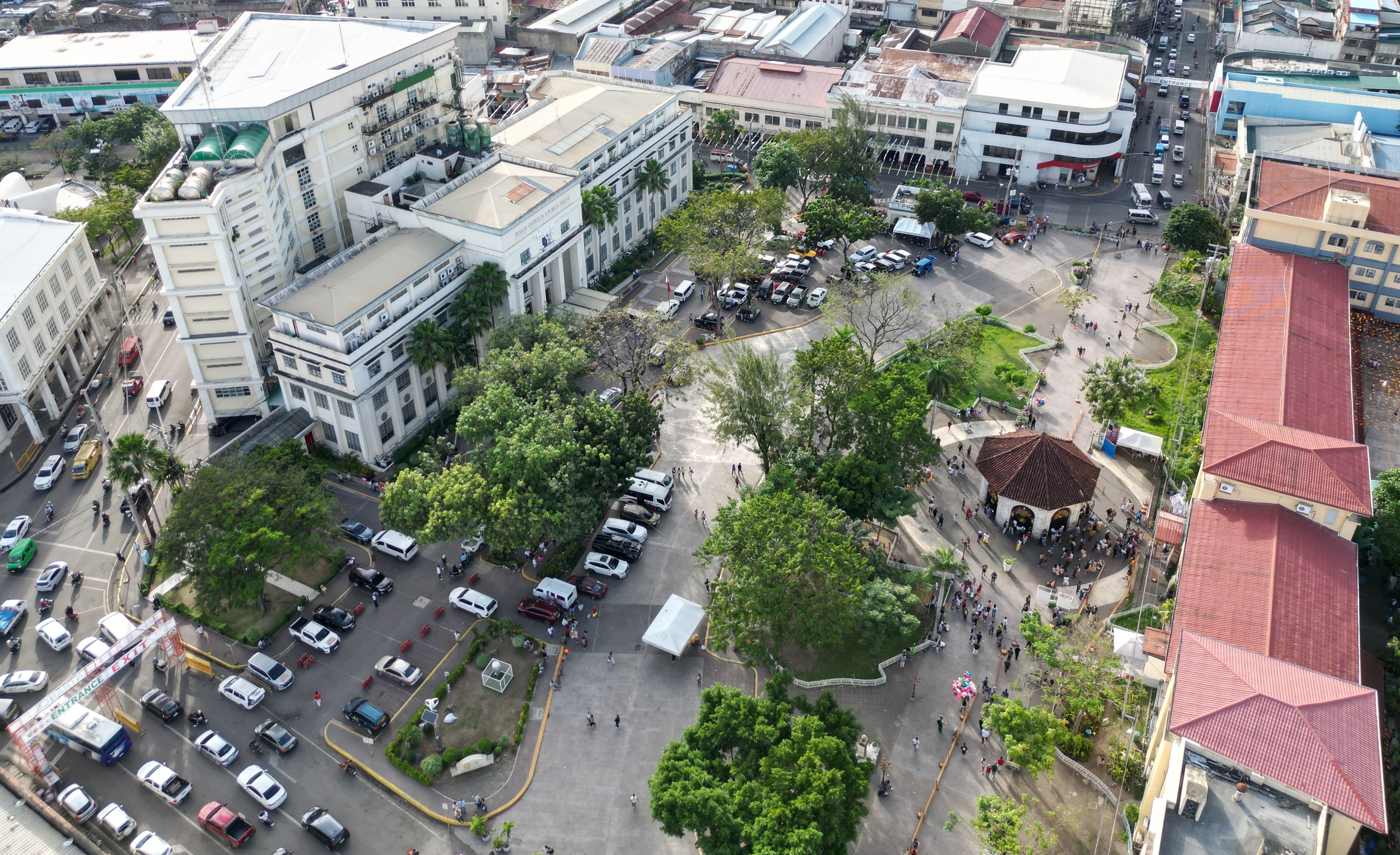
- Features: Jose Rizal Monument; Sergio Osmeña Jr. Monument; Vicente Rama Monument; Quincententennial historical marker
- Location: Cebu City, Philippines
- Location within Metro Cebu Location within Visayas Location within Philippines
- Coordinates: 10°17′36″N 123°54′6″E

Plaza Sugbu, formerly known as Plaza Rizal, is a public square in Cebu City, Philippines. The square connects the Magellan's Cross kiosk and the Cebu City Hall. The square was inaugurated in 2008 by Philippine president Gloria Arroyo.

== Monuments ==
Several monuments are located in the Plaza Sugbu grounds, including:

- Jose Rizal monument
- Sergio Osmeña Jr. monument
- Vicente Rama monument
- Quincentennial historical marker
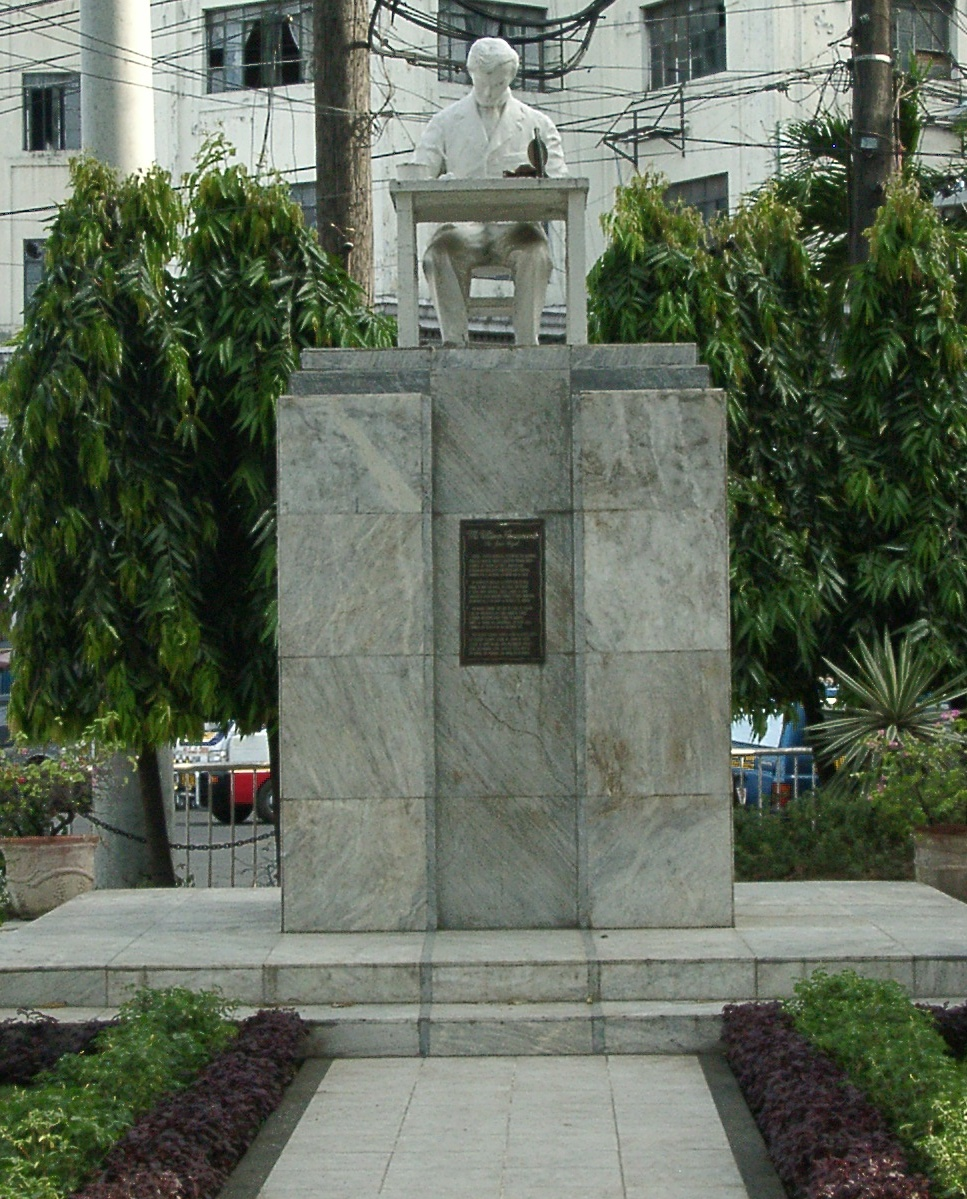
Jose Rizal monument

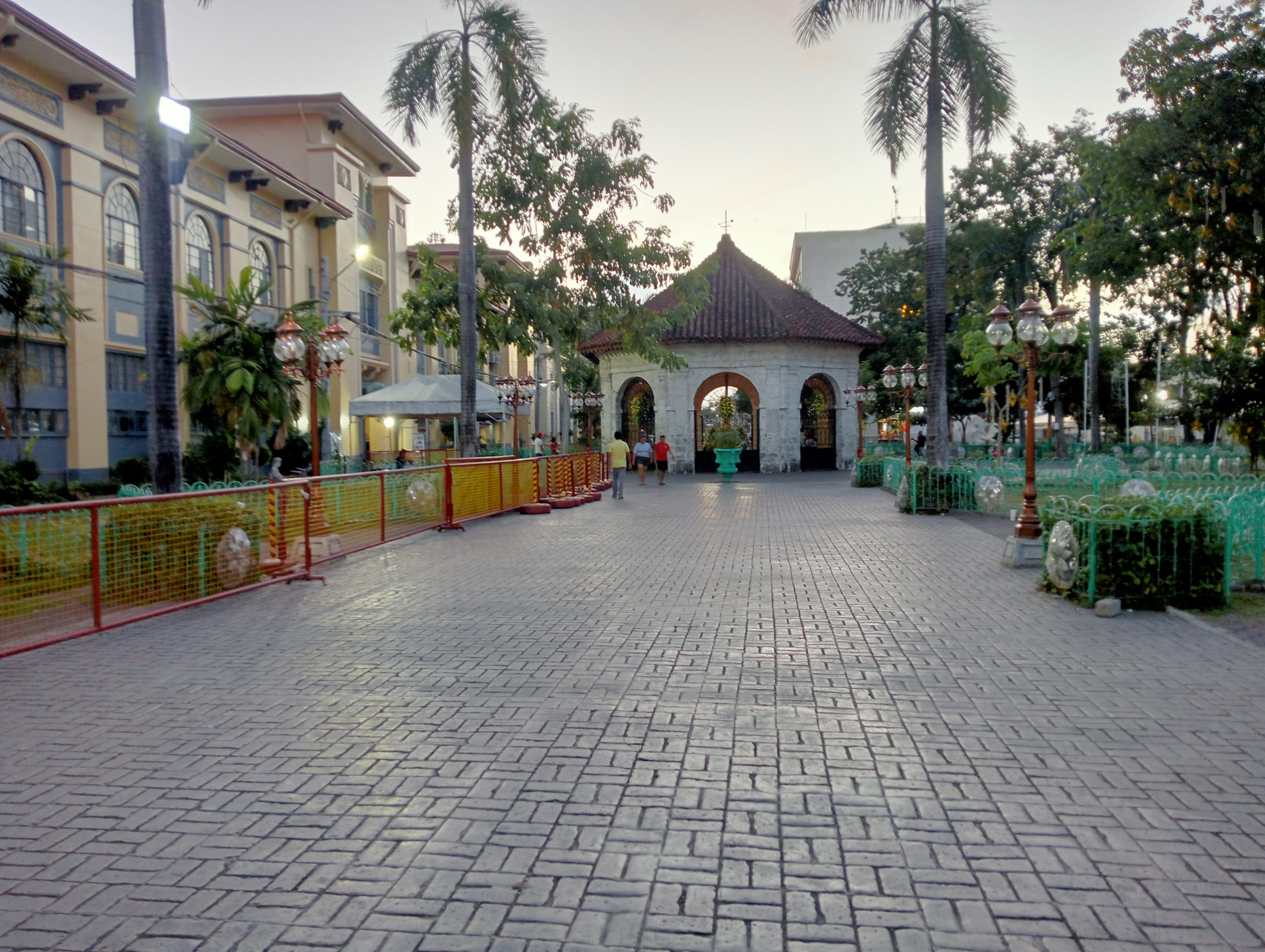
Magellan's Cross Pavilion

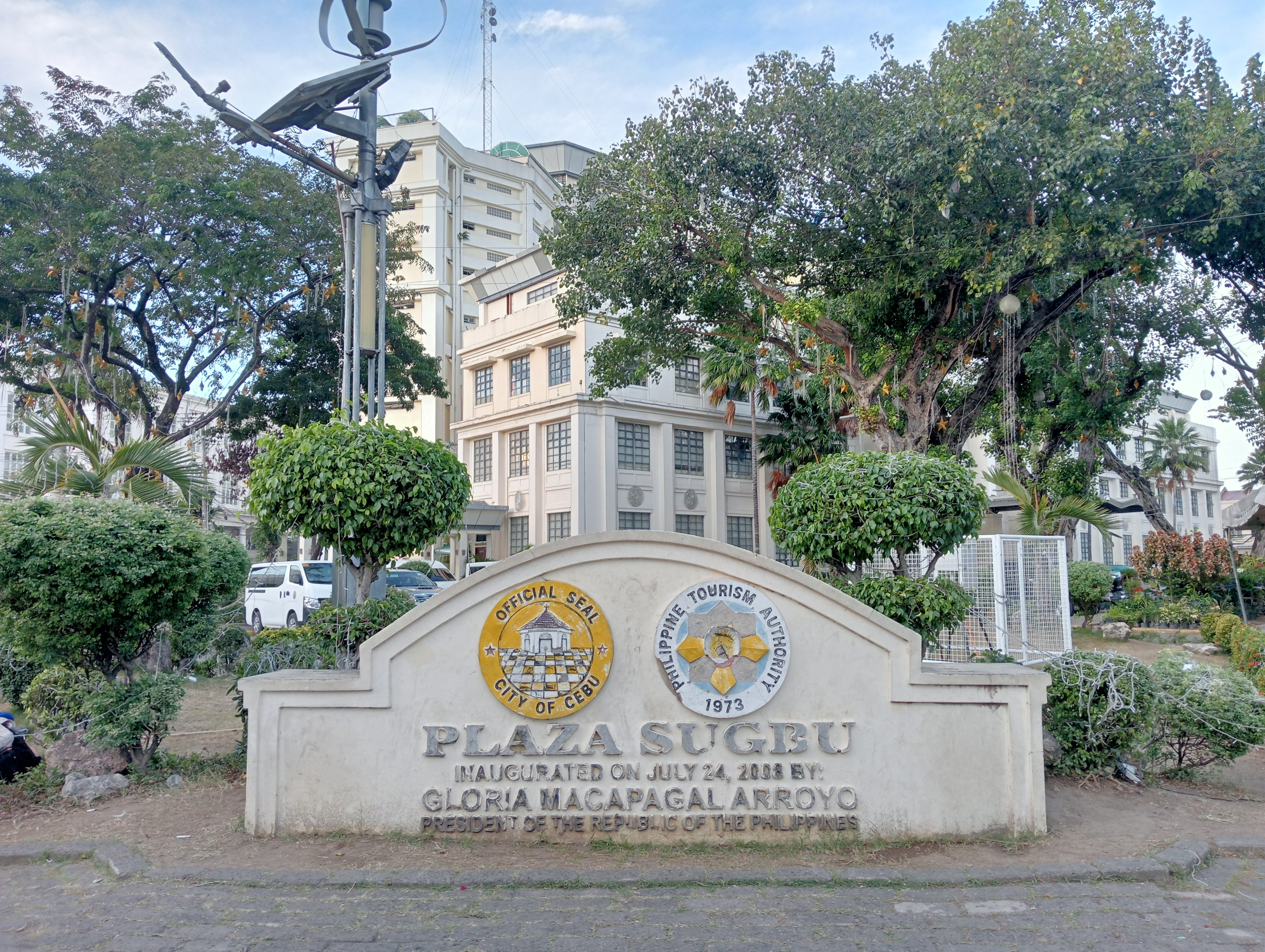
Square signage

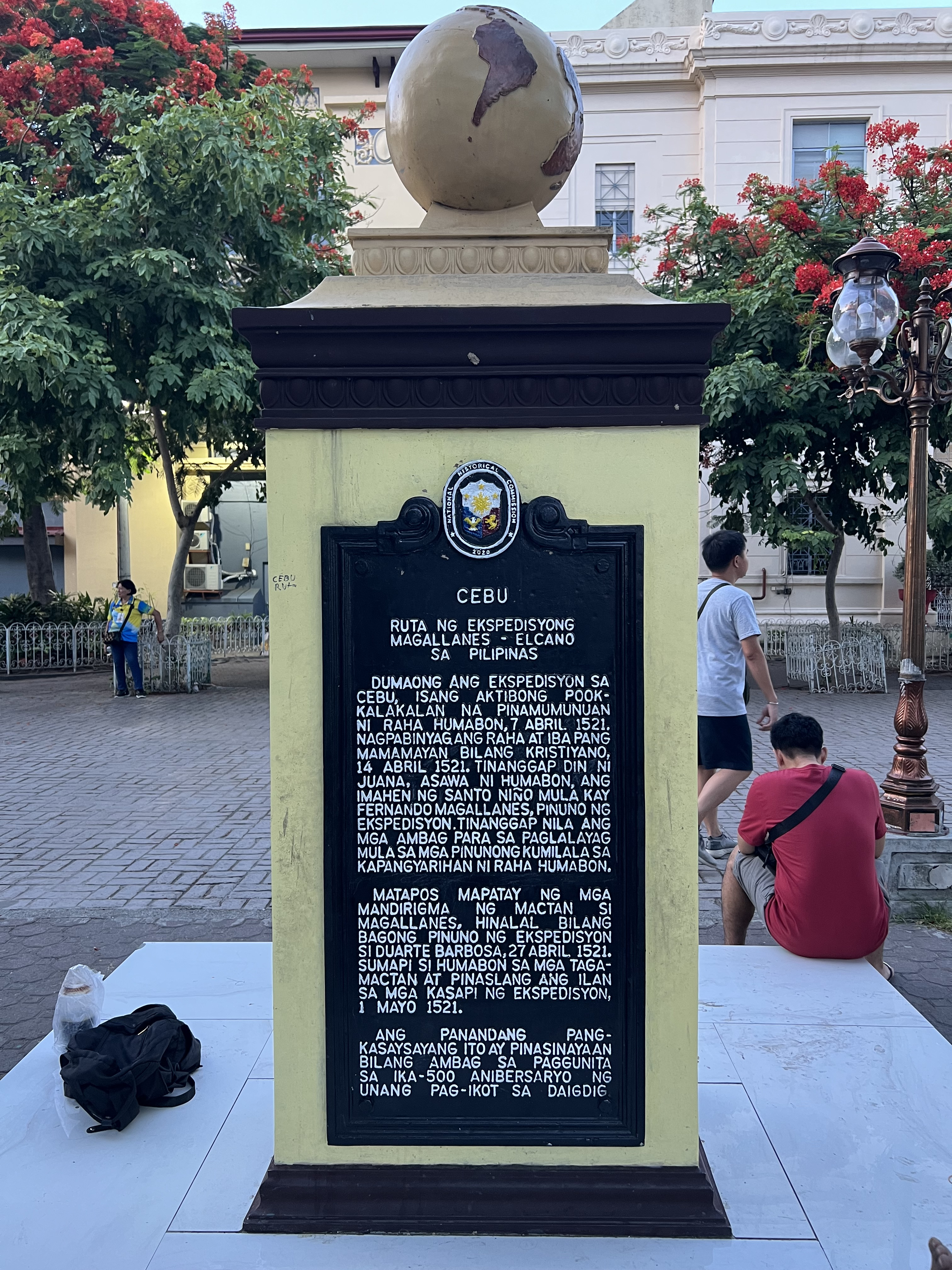
Quincentennial historical marker
