= Primitivo Sato =

Filipino lawyer and politician

The Honourable Primitivo N. Sato
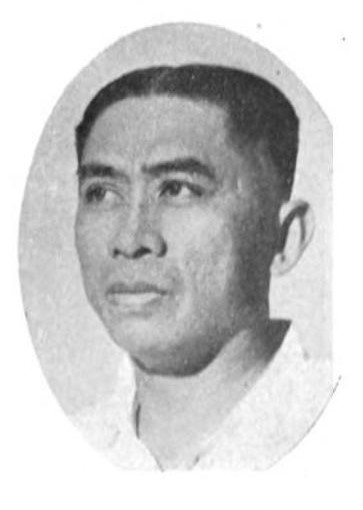

Member of the Philippine House of Representatives from Cebu's 3rd district
- In office December 30, 1949 – December 30, 1953
- Preceded by: Maximino Noel
- Succeeded by: Maximino Noel

Personal details
- Born: November 27, 1911 Carcar, Cebu, Philippines
- Died: February 10, 1972 (aged 60)
- Party: Liberal
- Education: University of the Philippines (AA); Philippine Law School (LLB)

Primitivo Nacario Sato (November 27, 1911 – February 10, 1972) was a Filipino Visayan lawyer from Cebu, Philippines and Congressman of Cebu's 3rd district from 1949 until 1952.

== Early life ==
Primitivo N. Sato, the son of Segundo Sato, was born in Carcar, Cebu on November 27, 1911. He passed the bar exams and was admitted to the Philippine Bar by December 23, 1937, becoming known to be a tax and inheritance laws expert and one of the few Filipino lawyers who had a doctorate of Civil Law. He married Julieta Erediano and the couple bore children namely Molly, Wesley, Rene, Bennie, Tita, Lorna, Letecia, and Annabelle.

== Career ==
Campaigning under the Liberal Party, he was voted as representative of the Cebu's 3rd legislative district during the 2nd Congress of the Republic in 1949. His term was cut short in 1952 because he was unseated by Maximino Noel who filed and was successful in an electoral protest at the House Electoral Tribunal.

== Landmark case on attorney's fees ==
In a landmark Supreme Court decision on the matter of attorney's fees, Sato successfully defended the right to compensation for services rendered to the estate of Rallos family. Simeon Rallos, the administrator of the estates of Numeriana Rallos and Victoria Rallos, engaged the services of Sato, who was then a Congressman, in reducing tax liabilities. Rallos would later refuse to pay, prompting Sato to file a suit. On September 30, 1964, the Supreme Court overruled the lower court's decision dismissing the case and stated that attorney's fees may be collected to an estate even after it was distributed to the heirs.

== Academe ==
The founders of Southwestern University, Matias Hipolito Chavez Aznar II and Anunciacion Barcenilla who were his clients, appointed him as the first dean of the institution's College of Law.

== Later years ==
Sato died on February 10, 1972.
