= Bag-ong Kusog =

Pre-war Cebuano periodical

Bag-ong Kusog (New Force)
- Founder: Vicente Rama
- Founded: 1921
- Ceased publication: 1941
- Language: Cebuano
- Headquarters: Cebu City, Philippines
- Sister newspapers: Nueva Fuerza
- Free online archives: https://archive.cebuanostudiescenter.com/pdf/

Bag-ong Kusog (New Force) was a periodical in the Cebuano language that was in circulation before World War II. Established in 1915 in Cebu, Philippines, with its bilingual predecessor, Nueva Fuerza, it was published every Friday until it ceased operations at the outbreak of the war in 1941.

== History ==
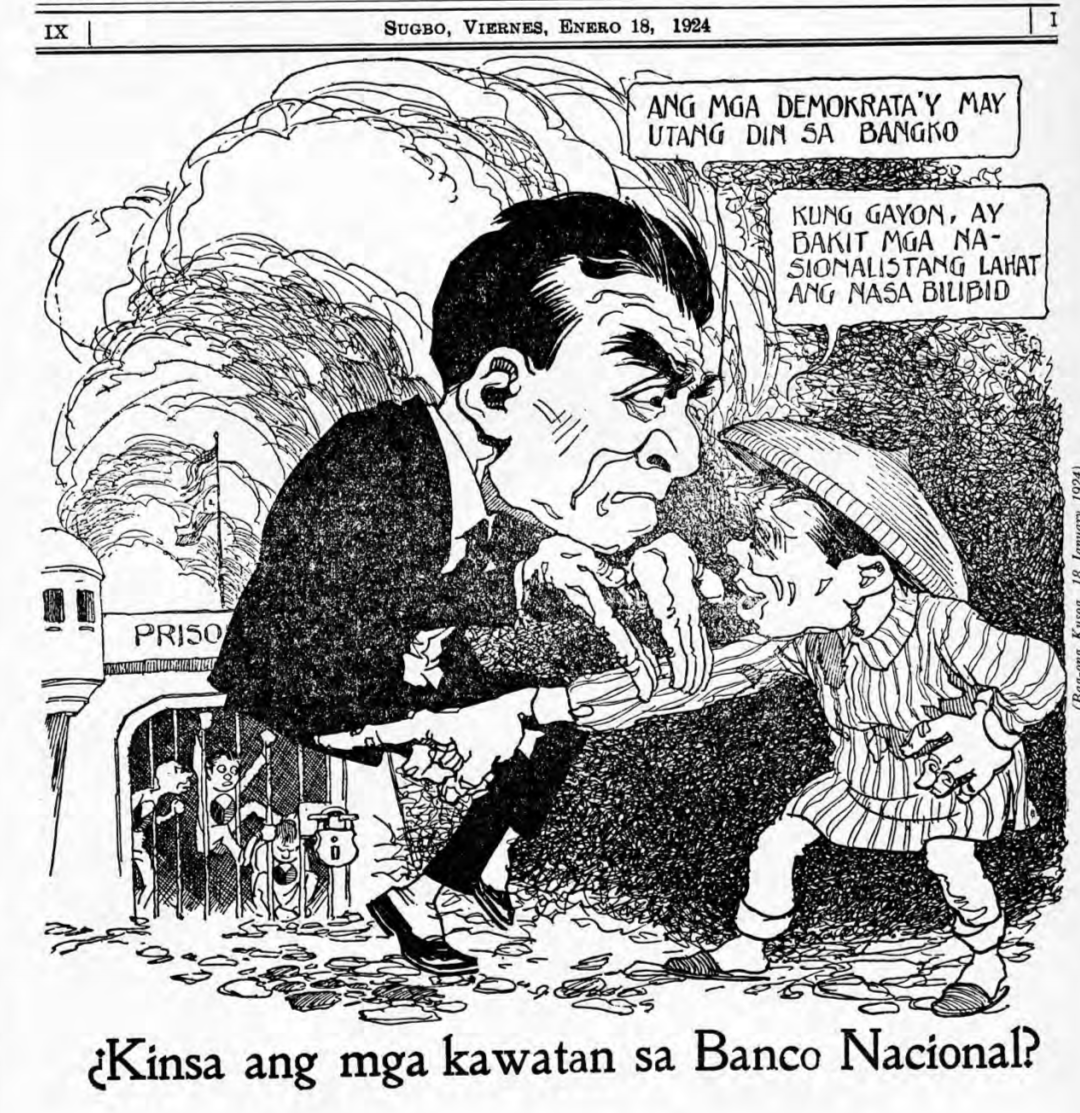
Cartoon from Bag-ong Kusog depicting Senate President Manuel L. Quezon referring to the Philippine National Bank controversy, published in January 18, 1924

After three centuries of Spanish colonial rule and in the Commonwealth period under the Americans, mass media in the country prospered. The period between 1916 and 1935 likewise marked the steady decline of Spanish as a lingua franca in Cebu and the rise of Cebuano publications.

Bag-ong Kusog started out as a Spanish–Cebuano bi-weekly publication named Nueva Fuerza. Founded on May 2, 1915, by writer, editor, and politician Vicente Rama, Nueva Fuerza later became tri-weekly starting on February 7, 1919. Its printing press company, which was previously the Imprenta Rosario and then Imprenta "The Cebu Chronicle", was sold to Vicente Rama. The company was then renamed "The Cebu Press" in 1917. Rama was assisted by circulation manager Felipe Tabasa, and editors Julio Pongan and Eustaquio B. Gonzales.

By 1922, Nueva Fuerza was absorbed by the sister weekly, Bag-ong Kusog, whose first issue was printed in 1921. The transition to Cebuano was driven by nationalistic sentiment prevalent in those times.

In its heyday, Bag-ong Kusog was the leading periodical with a circulation of 7,000, considered high at that time. It was the most successful regional periodical excluding the Manila-printed issues by Liwayway Publications. It enjoyed popularity and wide readership in Cebuano-speaking provinces in Visayas and Mindanao, as well as immigrants in Hawaii. Its last issue was released in 1941 at the outbreak of the World War II.

== Contents ==
Bag-ong Kusog and other local periodicals were considered popular form of reading material in the pre-war era. They were inexpensive and contained information that appealed to the masses newly accustomed to a free press. It contained coverage of current events, editorials, reports, columns, and literary works. Like the periodicals of its time, its role was assumed to be a vehicle for social change. One of the chief concerns of the writers of Bag-ong Kusog and the press was the changing attitude towards Spanish-era social customs and traditions particularly among young people that was attributed to the secularism brought by the Americans.

Similar to the periodicals at that time, its contents may contain information that forward political interest. According to scholars, during a congressional race that pitted Vicente Rama and Maximino Noel, Rama published a story where the hero's name was an anagram of Rama and villain's name that of Noel.

== Impact on Cebuano literary arts ==
The press in general contributed greatly to the development of Cebuano literary arts in the decades leading up to the war. Writers published their works on newspapers and magazines due to the underdevelopment of book publishing industry in Cebu, and Bag-ong Kusog printed literary outputs, publishing literary works such as novels, short stories, folklore and poetry.

Cebuano poets produced an estimated 13,000 poems before the war in various media. In addition, Bag-ong Kusog published Dr. Gardeopatra Gador Quijano's Lourdes, the first ever feminist novel written in the Cebuano language, with its advocacy for women to exercise their right of suffrage, through serialized printing in its August to September 1939 issues. Additionally, it was also one of the crucial instruments in developing the art of Cebuano essay and journalism, as well as publishing the works of writers of short story which became popular in the early part of the 20th century.

== Historical commemoration ==
- The Cebuano Studies Center of University of San Carlos, in cooperation with the National Commission for Culture and the Arts (NCCA), launched Nueva Fuerza online archive last August 31, 2017, which digitized copies of the periodical from 1921 until 1926.

== See also ==
- Cebuano literature
- Vicente Rama
- Vicente Garces
