= Vicente Rama =

Filipino legislator, publisher, and writer from Cebu, Philippines

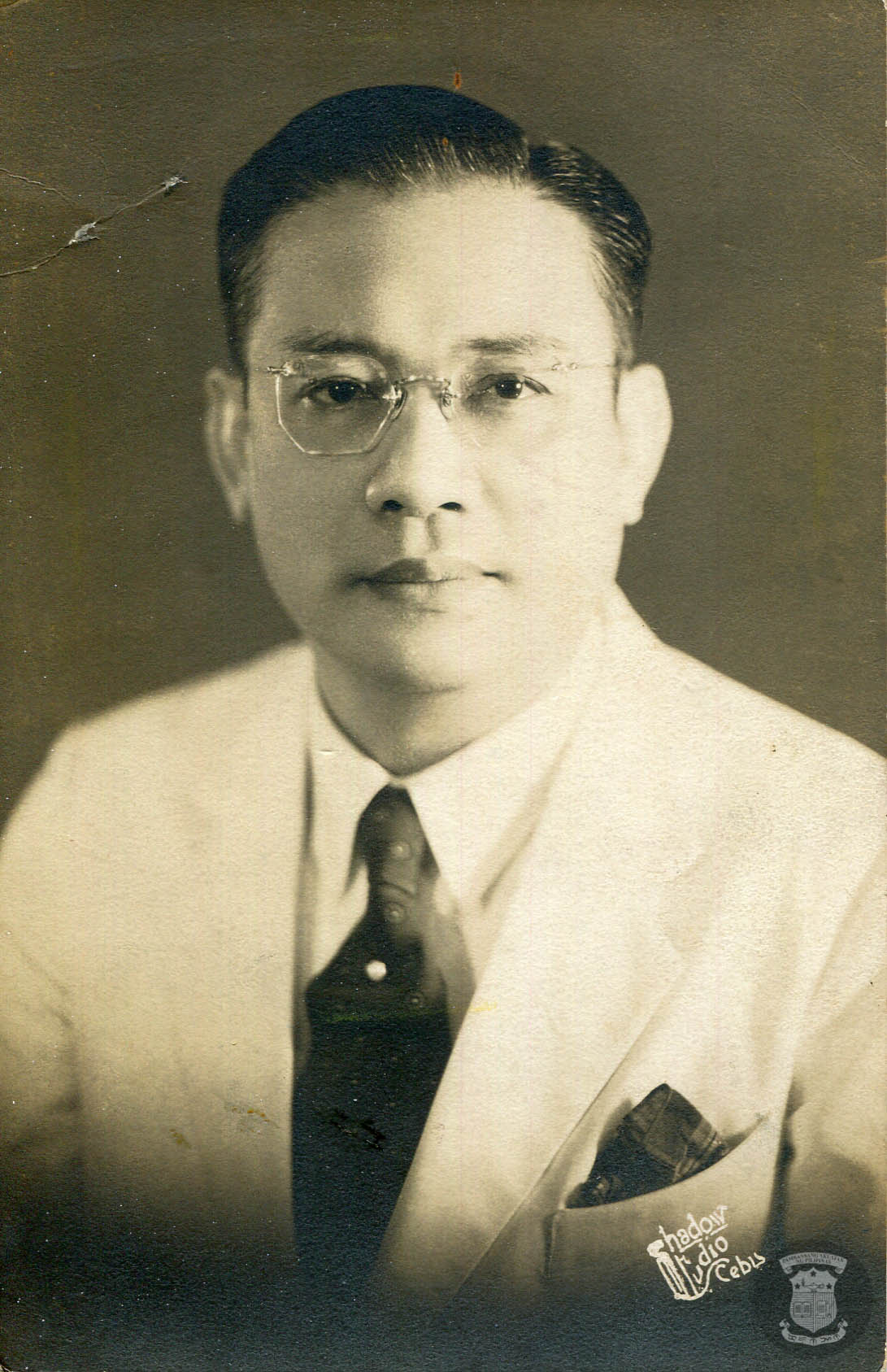

Senator of the Philippines
- In office July 9, 1945 – December 30, 1947

Mayor of Cebu City
- In office November 26, 1938 – August 2, 1940
- Appointed by: Manuel L. Quezon
- Preceded by: Alfredo Jacinto
- Succeeded by: Jose Delgado

Member of the National Assembly of the Philippines from Cebu's 4th district
- In office September 16, 1935 – December 30, 1938
- Preceded by: Agustin Kintanar
- Succeeded by: Agustin Kintanar

Member of the Philippine House of Representatives from Cebu's 3rd district
- In office 1934 – September 16, 1935
- Preceded by: Maximino Noel
- Succeeded by: Agustin Kintanar
- In office 1922–1928
- Preceded by: Vicente Urgello
- Succeeded by: Maximino Noel

Member of the Cebu Municipal Council
- In office 1916–1922

Personal details
- Born: June 6, 1887 Cebu, Cebu, Captaincy General of the Philippines
- Died: December 24, 1956 (aged 69) Cebu City, Cebu, Philippines
- Party: Nacionalista (1934–1956); Democrata (1916–1928)
- Children: Osmundo; Napoleon; Clemente; Jesus; Fernando; Lourdes; Laurente; Reynalda; Corazon; Resurreccion; Marianela; Dario; Miguel
- Parents: Bernabe Raffiñan (father); Engilberta Rama (mother)
- Relatives: Annabelle Rama (granddaughter); Michael Rama (grandson)
- Education: Colegio de San Carlos; Escuela de Derecho de Manila
- Alma mater: Colegio-Seminario de San Carlos; Escuela de Derecho de Manila (LL.B)
- Occupation: Senator; Assemblyman; Congressman; Mayor; Councilor; Publisher; Writer; Poet

Vicente Rama (June 6, 1887 – December 24, 1956) was a Filipino Visayan legislator, publisher, and writer from Cebu, Philippines. Recognized as the Father of Cebu City, he authored the bill for its cityhood which was approved into law by October 20, 1936. He also founded the leading pre-war Cebuano periodical, Bag-ong Kusog.

== Early life ==
Vicente Rama, also known with the honorific title, Don Vicente and Nyor Inting, was born in Cebu, Philippines on June 6, 1887. He was the eldest child of Gabriel "Abi" Raffiñan y Buzón and Engilberta "Iya Bita" Ramas y Enguio, who was the child of Laurente Ramas and Juana Enguio from Naga. He carried the last name "Rama" later on in life, providing no hint why he decided to drop its last letter. His mother, who managed a copra-tobacco brokerage, named him after St. Vincent Ferrer and raised him and his sister, Susana, as a single parent.

Upon the death of his father from diabetes mellitus, the same illness he would be afflicted with in his later years, he received a parcel of land. However, he seemed to have either ignored or forgotten the inheritance.

== Education ==
Rama attended the Seminario-Colegio de San Carlos, now known as the University of San Carlos, from 1904 until 1908, and he excelled at school. After his graduation, Rama went to Manila for further studies as was the practice among children of prominent families. It was also perceived as a positive attainment to possess when applying for jobs. Attending the Escuela de Derecho de Manila in 1908, he graduated with a law degree in 1910, and he did not proceed to take the bar exam to become a lawyer.

== Personal life and family ==
Rama married Catalina (Aquilana) Genson, and the couple had 16 children: physician and Cebu Governor Osmundo, commissioner and journalist Napoleon, Cebu City Councilor Clemente, lawyer Jesus, Fernando, Lourdes, Laurente, Reynalda, Corazon, Resurreccion, Marianela, Dario, and Miguel. Three of the 16 offspring did not survive childhood. The family moved from Pahina, San Nicolas to a three-hectare farm lot in Basak.

He disciplined his children and avoided using his influence in their behalf. For instance, he did not intervene when one of his children spent a night in jail after being involved in an altercation. Also, he did not allow his wife to use any government-owned vehicles. He insisted that his children put more effort into their studies, and had all of his daughters sent to school when it was customary for families to do so only with their male children.

== Career in journalism ==
Rama was one of the pioneers in Cebuano journalism and literature at a time when the use of Cebuano language in the media was peaking and the Spanish language was waning as a lingua franca. He became a newspaper editor at age 15 and began publishing in 1906. In 1908, he was a staff member of Spanish periodical El Precursor that was founded by election lawyer Domingo Franco and printed from 1907 until 1941. Later on, Mariano Jesus Cuenco took over its ownership. In addition, he edited several publications including Kauswagan that was founded by Francisco Labrador from 1912 until 1914. Likewise, he edited Vicente Sotto's Cebuano newspaper, Ang Suga (The Light), and Luz de Vizaya, and wrote for El Renacimiento, La Democracia, and Libertas.

On May 2, 1915, he established the bilingual periodical Nuerva Fuerza, which later on became a mainly Cebuano weekly Bag-ong Kusog (New Force). Rama was assisted by circulation manager Felipe Tabasa, and editors Julio Pongan and Eustaquio B. Gonzales, among others. Bag-ong Kusog was one of the periodicals that enjoyed popularity and wide readership in Cebuano-speaking provinces of Visayas and Mindanao, as well as among immigrants in Hawaii. Its contents dealt with public life of pre-war Cebuanos and the worrying decline towards observance of attitudes and tradition dating back to the time of Spanish colonization and the encroaching secularism brought by the American colonizers. Rama's published works encompassed various topics such as public service, Cebuano language, and literary arts.

Between 1928 and 1934, Rama also ran an English-language weekly Progress. A sister publication of Bag-ong Kusog, Progress was launched on December 2, 1928. Later on, it became a daily starting December 22, 1929. Additionally, it was suspended from operation from May 15, 1931, until November 22, 1931.

== Cebuano literature ==
Other than being a newspaperman, Rama wrote non-fiction, poems, short stories and novels using pseudonyms like Datu Dakila, Kolas Tabian, Justo Recio Recto, Mahomet Ben Yakub, Rectum Clarum. He printed two story collections: Larawan (Portrait) in 1921 and Aegri Somnia in 1922, and he also penned Sa Bung-aw sa mga Kasal-anan (On the Precipice of Transgression), which was a novel serialized in Bag-ong Kusog from 1933 to 1934, Ang Tinagoan (The Secret), also a novel that was printed from August 18, 1933, to March 9, 1934, and an adaptation of Jose Rizal's novel.

His newspaper, Bag-ong Kusog, also published the works of creative writers. It printed Lourdes, a novel by Gardeopatra Gador Quijano, the first ever feminist novel written in Cebuano.

Even after Bag-ong Kusog failed to release new issues after World War II, he continued to write. In 1947, he finished the novel Donya Marcosa and a year after, Ang Silot ni Bathala (God's Punishment). Resil Mojares on his critique of Rama's work wrote, "Rama was not just a publisher. In and out of Bag-ong Kusog, he was a prolific writer of novels, short stories, poems, editorials, columns and essays. What is most striking about his writings is their contemporaneity."

== Political career ==
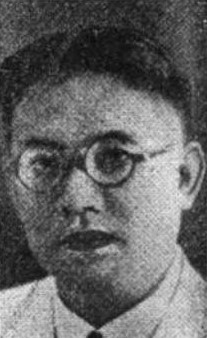
Rama as member of the Philippine House of Representatives, published by Benipayo Press c. 1935

His political career was launched when he won a seat in the municipal council of Cebu on June 16, 1916. Then, he was elected as representative of the third congressional district of Cebu and served three terms: 1922–1925, 1925–1928, and 1934–1935. He won as assemblyman in the fourth district of Cebu and became a member of the first National Assembly in 1935.

After his bill was approved to transform Cebu from a municipality to a chartered city, he was appointed as Inaugural Mayor of Cebu City and took oath before President Manuel L. Quezon at Malacañang Palace from 1938 to 1940. He replaced Alfredo V. Jacinto, the first municipal mayor of Cebu and former provincial treasurer of Cebu. Rama later resigned as mayor in order to run for senator in 1941.

From 1916 to 1935, all senators were voted into office from 12 senatorial districts. By November 11, 1941, Rama ran for a seat in the senate in the national elections. He won, receiving overwhelming electorate support in Cebu, and placing first in Bohol and third in Davao. The outbreak of World War II prevented him and the rest of elected senators from serving their term until Congress reconvened in 1945. During the war, he was appointed acting mayor of Carcar on May 15, 1942.

Rama was known to be skilled at public speaking, fluent in Spanish and English. After he retired, he wrote on the various highlights of his political life.

== Cebu City Charter ==
Rama authored the bill that called for the creation of Cebu City, transforming the municipality to a chartered city. His vision was to endow more power to the new city under the law by decreasing its dependence on national government's revenue allotment. However, he met many challenges in gathering support for the approval of the bill and made many enemies even from local political leaders and organizations.

On October 20, 1936, the Commonwealth Act No. 58 creating the City of Cebu was approved and subsequently signed into law by President Manuel Quezon. On the inauguration of the City of Cebu, Alfredo V. Jacinto was appointed as the first mayor of the new city who was sworn into office by then Secretary of the Interior Elpidio Quirino on February 24, 1937. Rama was then on hailed as the Father of Cebu City.

== Life during the war ==
During World War II, Rama and his family evacuated to Carcar where they were invited to live in the hacienda of a wealthy farmer named Pedro Mancao The evacuation stalled when he refused to leave behind his son Napoleon who was in a seminary studying for priesthood. The seminarians were told to stay in the seminary that was relocated away from the city.

The Japanese army hunted down Rama, who was just elected senator, to be appointed as part of the new government. On April 10, 1942, Jose Osmeña, child of then Vice President and former President Sergio Osmeña Sr., met him and brought the message of Colonel Kawakani, the chief of the Japanese Military Administrations, that instructed him to report to the army headquarters. When he refused, a Japanese army unit was dispatched on April 28 to where he was staying and he was brought to the headquarters in the town center of Carcar. By May 3, 1942, he refused the offer to become governor of Cebu and said Hilario Abellana was the incumbent provincial governor. He was then offered the mayoral post of Cebu City and, later, of Carcar with threats that he and his family would be killed should he continue to decline.

== Death ==
Rama died on December 24, 1956, at the age of 69.

== Historical commemoration ==
- In 2014, a life-size brass statue was erected at Plaza Sugbu in Cebu City. It was designed by national artist for sculpture Eduardo Castrillo and commissioned by Insular Life.
- Previously known as Calamba Street, Vicente Rama Street in Cebu City was named in his honor.
- A statue of Don Vicente Rama remains at the City Fire Department grounds.
- In 2009, Museo Sugbo opened a special gallery dedicated to his books and memorabilia.
- Approved on March 24, 1992, Republic Act No. 7287 declared February 24 as special nonworking holiday known as Cebu City Charter Day in Cebu, Philippines.
- Ang Tinagoan (The Secret) is cited as one of the notable works in the Cebuano literary canon.
- In 2004, Basak National High School was renamed Don Vicente Rama Memorial National High School.

== See also ==
- Cebuano literature – Literature of the Cebuano people of the Philippines
- Bag-ong Kusog – Pre-war Cebuano periodical
- Vicente Garces – Cebuano politician, writer, and poet
