= Vicente Garces =

Cebuano politician, writer, and poet

The Honourable Vicente Hermosa Garces

Mayor of Talisay, Cebu
- In office 1925–1937

Personal details
- Born: December 18, 1887
- Died: September 5, 1971 (aged 83)
- Party: Partido Democrata
- Education: Colegio de San Carlos
- Occupation: Politician; Writer; Poet
- Profession: Lawyer; Writer; Poet

Vicente Hermosa Garces, also known as Vicente Garces and Nyor Inting, was a Filipino Visayan politician, writer, and poet. His famous written works in Cebuano were published in Visayan newspaper, Bag-ong Kusog. He also served as mayor in the then municipality of Talisay, Cebu, Philippines from 1925 to 1937.

== Early life and education ==
Vicente H. Garces was to parents Agapito Garces and Teodora Hermosa born on December 18, 1887. The family used to reside in the district of Parian, Cebu City. He attended school at the Colegio de San Carlos, and then proceeded to take a law degree at the Lyceum de Manila.

At age 18, he married Resureccion Bangoy who was fondly called Lola Eccion and bore 13 children namely Alfreda, Agapito, Asteria, Clarita, Jesusa, Jose, Mariano, Pilar, Resureccion, Sincletica, Teodora, Vicente, and Virginio. Upon his marriage, he settled in Talisay, Cebu with his wife and children. The Garces Ancestral house is still extant on Jose Rizal Street in Talisay. The house was built in 1955 and was one of the tallest structures in the Poblacion.

== Literary career ==
Garces wrote for the Vicente Rama-owned Visayan newspaper, Bag-ong Kusog, using the pseudonyms Garvi and Kampisaw, after the name of a bird. His earliest published works included Kaniya Gibuhat ang Iyang Nabuhat (To Whom it was Done What's Done), Mahinuklogogng Paglubong ni Alicia (The Sorrowful Burial of Alice), and May Katarongan kang Imo Akong Hikalimtan (You Have Reason To Forget Me). He was regarded as one of the pioneers in Cebuano short story genre and his story, Mahinuklogogng Paglubong ni Alicia (The Sorrowful Burial of Alice), is considered part of the regional literary canon.

He organized Dilang Bisaya (DILBIS), a literary group established 1963, and became its first president.

== Political career ==
Garces was the local leader in Talisay of the political party, Partido Democrata. The party included Vicente Rama and Vicente Sotto, both of whom were his colleagues in journalism. In 1925, he ran in the election and won as mayor in the then municipality of Talisay. He served from 1925 to 1931. On September 5, 1971, he died at the age of 83.

== Historical commemoration ==
- Garces was named as one of the pre-war Cebuano writers in the short story genre by the National Library of the Philippines.
- The Cebu provincial government cited his published work, Mahinuklugong Paglubong ni Alicia, as one of the notable works in the Cebuano literary canon.
- The Cebuano Studies Center of the University of San Carlos included him in the list of pre-World War II published Cebuano authors.
- Vicente H. Garces Street was named after him. Located in Barangay Poblacion, it is one of the major thoroughfares in Talisay City, passing through Talisay City College (formerly the municipal hall) and the parish church, Archdiocesan Shrine of St. Therese of Avila.

== See also ==
- Cebuano literature
- Bag-ong Kusog
- Vicente Rama
