= Don Vicente Rama Memorial National High School =

Public high school in Cebu City, Philippines

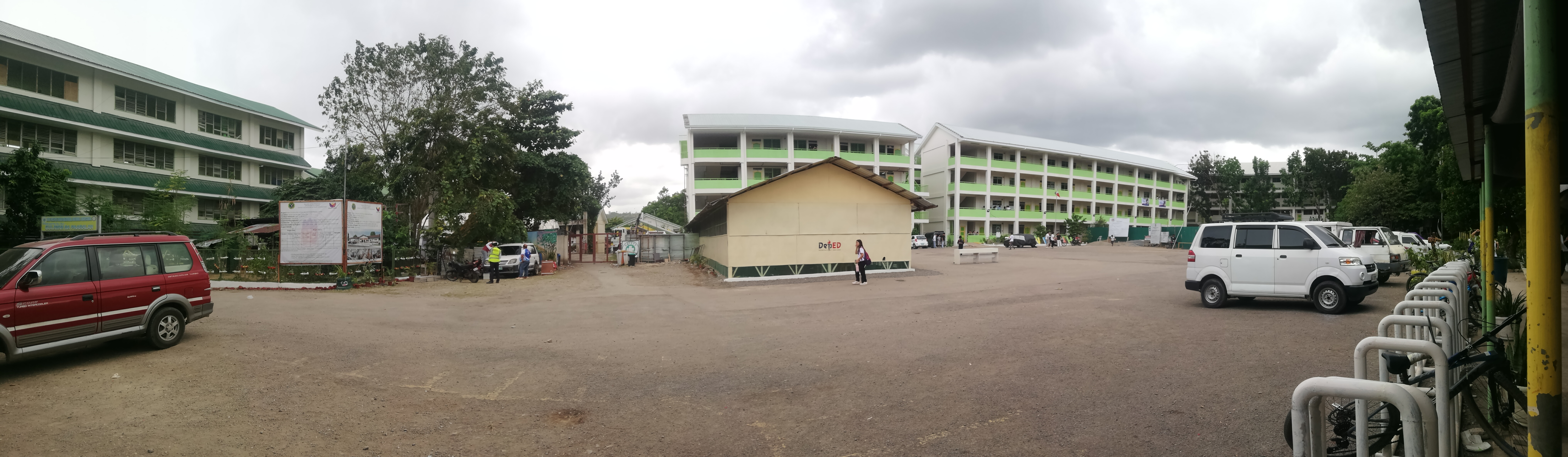

Location
- Macopa Street, Basak San Nicolas, Cebu City, Cebu; Central Visayas; Philippines

Information
- Former names: Don Carlos A. Gothong Memorial National High School — Basak Extension; Basak National High School
- Type: Public High School, Coeducational
- Motto: Knowledge, Virtue, Productivity
- Established: June 7, 1993
- Oversight: Cebu City Division
- Principal: Dr. Rosemarie O. Novabos
- Grades: 7 to 12
- Enrollment: Students (S.Y. 2026 - 2027)
- Campus: Urban
- Colors: Green and White
- Newspaper: Pen Reflections (English Version) and Bidlisiw (Filipino Version)

Don Vicente Rama Memorial National High School is a public secondary school in Cebu City in the Philippines.

== History ==
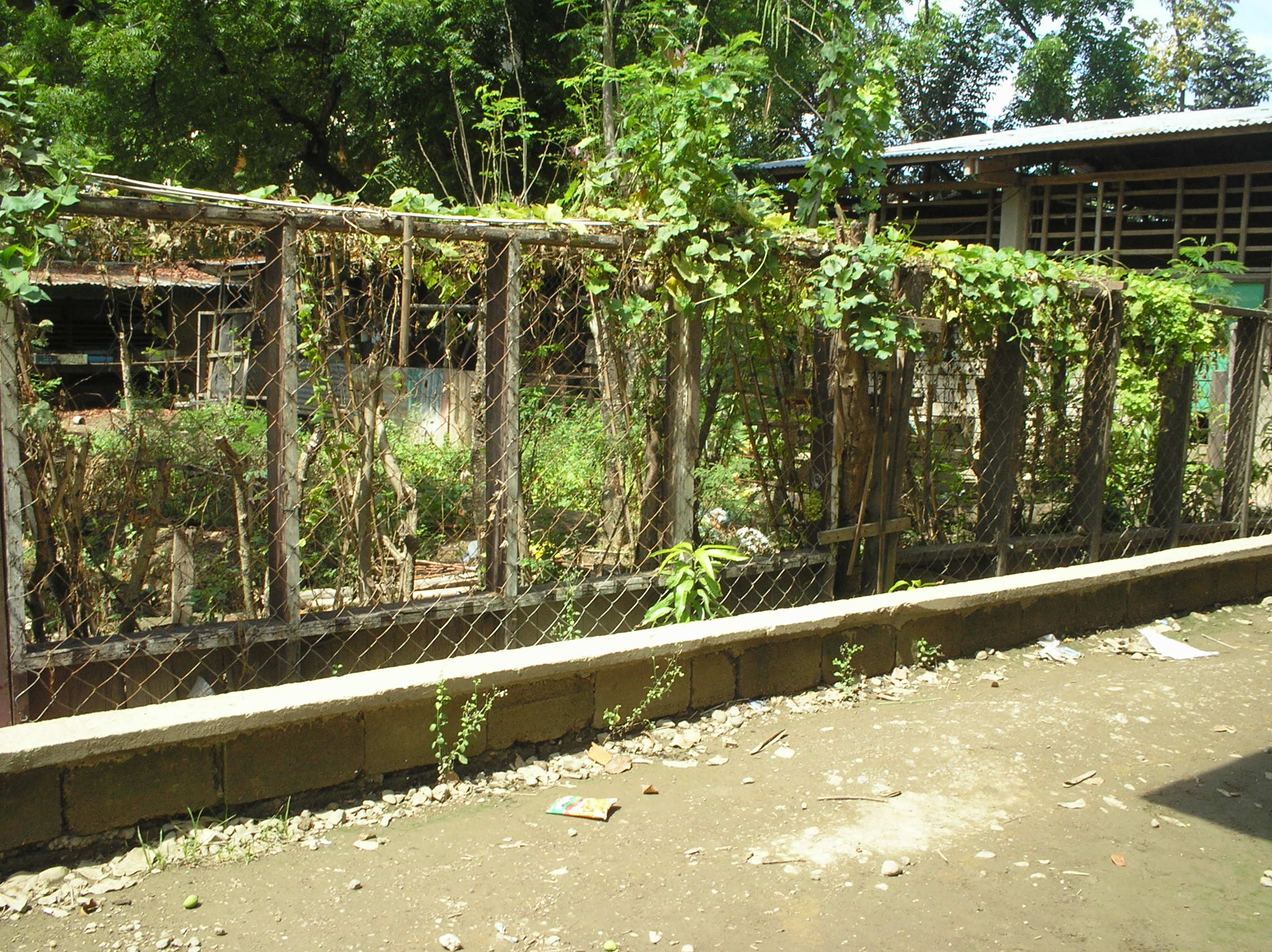
Don Vicente Rama Memorial National High School Garden

The first national high school in the south of Cebu City was opened on June 7, 1993, and acquired its name as Cebu City Don Carlos A. Gothong Memorial National High School – Basak Extension through DECS Order No. 5, series of 1989. This was made possible through the joint effort of the then Department of Education, Culture and Sports now Dep-Ed, Division of Cebu City headed by Dr. Dolores P. Abellanosa and Cebu City Government with Hon. Alvin B. Garcia as Mayor. The first principal was Dr. Matilde R. Mayonila.

The school started with 300 first year students with 50 students per section. There were eleven pioneer teachers namely Mrs. Lilibeth Tujan, Mrs. Ruby Enriquez, Mrs. Agnes Alfajardo, the late Mrs. Agustita Gabrera, Mrs. Fermencita Pacaña, Mrs. Josefina Bacalso, Miss Teresa Baril, Mr. Ricardo Diola, the late Mr. Mario Gabuya, Mr. Severino Panton and Mrs. Evelyn Hinon.

The school became independent with national funding last October 9, 1993. The following year, in 1994, the school acquired its new name, the Basak National High School. Through Sangguniang Panlungsod resolution in 2004, Basak National High School was converted into Don Vicente Rama Memorial National High School.

This school was named after Vicente Rama, a representative of Cebu's 3rd district instrumental as the author and sponsor of the bill of creating the City of Cebu and was enacted into a law as Commonwealth Act No. 58 by the Philippine Congress on October 20, 1936. He is also known as the "Father of the Cebu City Charter".

The school mainly serves the entire portion of Basak-San Nicolas and Basak-Pardo. It also serves the nearer barangays around it like Mambaling, Punta Princesa, Tisa, Kinasang-an Pardo, and Quiot.

At present, the school is being administered by Principal Dr. Rosemarie O. Novabos and Dr. Maximo C. Aniana Jr who is tasked to take charge of the Night Session.

The school is one of the biggest public schools in the South of Cebu City. The facilities of the school are adequate and its curriculum is in line with the Department of Education's curriculum.

It has an active Supreme Secondary Learner Government which monitors and mediates school activities. The latter also assists the school officials in all events within the school.

During the COVID-19 pandemic, the school buildings were used to isolate patients with COVID-19 until November 2020.
