= Agustin Kintanar =

Filipino lawyer from the Congressman

Agustín Kintanar
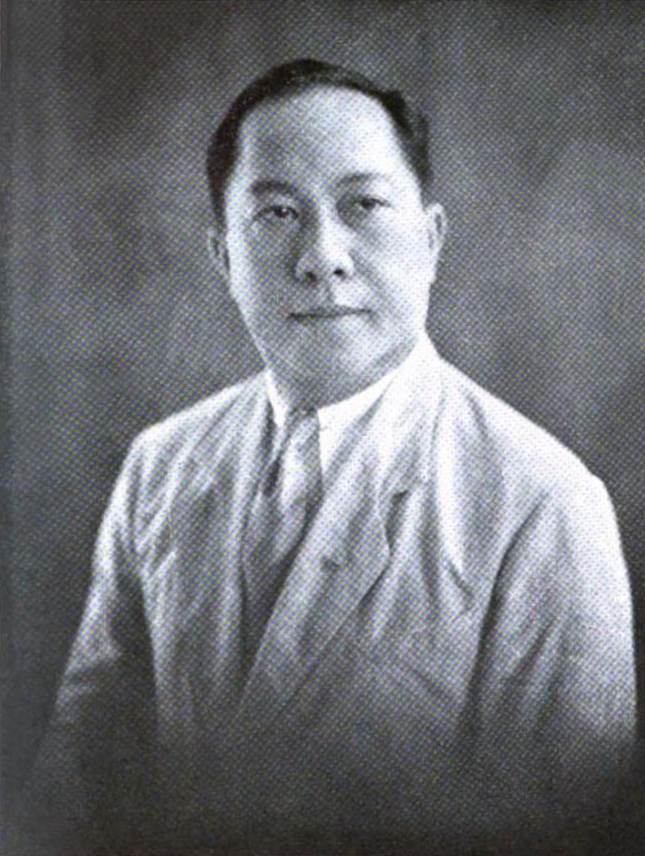
- Photograph from The Commercial & Industrial Manual of the Philippines, 1941

Member of the House of Representatives of the Philippines from Cebu's 4th district
- In office June 9, 1945 – December 30, 1949
- Preceded by: Himself (as member of the National Assembly)
- Succeeded by: Filomeno C. Kintanar
- In office June 5, 1934 – September 16, 1935
- Preceded by: Juan Alcazaren
- Succeeded by: Vicente Rama

Member of the National Assembly of the Philippines from Cebu
- In office December 30, 1938 – December 30, 1941
- Preceded by: Vicente Rama
- Succeeded by: Himself (as member of the House of Representatives)
- Constituency: 4th district
- In office September 16, 1935 – December 30, 1938
- Preceded by: Vicente Rama
- Succeeded by: Maximino Noel
- Constituency: 3rd district

Personal details
- Born: May 5, 1891 Argao, Cebu
- Died: February 6, 1969 (aged 77)
- Party: Nacionalista (from 1934); Democrata (until 1934)
- Education: University of the Philippines Diliman (LL.B)
- Profession: Lawyer

Agustín Yreneo Artiaga Kintanar (May 5, 1891 – February 6, 1969) was a Filipino Visayan lawyer from Cebu, Philippines who served as Cebu's representative and assemblyman from 1925 to 1941 and from 1945 to 1949.

== Early life ==
Agustín Y. Kintanar was the son of Román Kintanar and Petra Artiaga and born in Argao, Cebu on May 5, 1892. He acquired a bachelor's degree and law degree at the College of Law of the University of the Philippines in 1917, and became a lawyer on October 4, 1917. Married to Pureza Quintanilla Lucero, his children were Reynaldo Emmanuel, Carmelita Linda, Fidelis, Quintin, Simeon Victorino, Bernardita, Teresita Luz, Roman Antonio, Agustin Claro, Anafe, Serena, and Josefina Pureza.

== Career ==
In January 1920, he was appointed to the executive committee of the Partido Democrata, a newly formed political party, along with chairman Nicolas Rafols and vice chairman Vicente Rama on the visit of its president, Emiliano Tria Tirona. At the party's convention held in Rafols' residence on January 15, 1921, Kintanar was chosen candidate of Cebu's 4th congressional district for the 1922 general elections and would be chosen again in 1925 and in 1930. However, he lost in the elections of 1922, 1925, 1928 and 1931 to Juan Alcazaren.

In 1934, he was elected member of the 10th Philippine Legislature for Cebu's 4th district. He would be reelected in 1935 to the congressional seat at the 1st National Assembly of the Commonwealth, this time at the 3rd district, and then again in the 2nd National Assembly in 1938 to 1941 back at the 4th district. His election to the same legislative seat in 1941 was interrupted by World War II, and his term began in 1945 on the 1st Congress of the Commonwealth during the liberation period. He was once again elected to the 1st Congress of the Republic in 1946 and served until 1949.

During his tenure as Congressman, he witnessed the enactment of a bill that declared the municipality of Cebu a charter city and the third city in the Philippines after Manila and Baguio. In 1936, Manuel L. Quezon sent him a letter clarifying the president's position on the operation of Compañia Tabacalera and its attempts to rehabilitate one of its damaged ships, which Kintanar reportedly objected.

He was succeeded by Filomeno Kintanar.
