= Vicente Urgello =

Filipino lawyer and Congressman

The Honourable Vicente Urgello
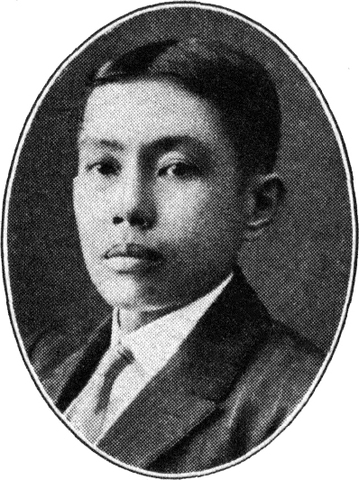
- Urgello as member of the Philippine House of Representatives, c. 1921

Member of the House of Representatives for Cebu's 3rd District
- In office 1916–1922
- Preceded by: Filemon Sotto
- Succeeded by: Vicente Rama

Personal details
- Born: Vicente Urgello y Sarmiento; April 22, 1875 Carcar, Cebu, Spanish East Indies
- Died: May 3, 1952 (aged 77)
- Party: Nacionalista
- Profession: Lawyer

Vicente Urgello y Sarmiento (April 22, 1875 – May 3, 1952) was a Filipino mestizo lawyer and legislator from Cebu, Philippines. He was a member of the House of the Representatives for Cebu's 3rd district from 1916 until 1922.

== Early life ==
Vicente Urgello was born in Carcar, Cebu to parents Francisco Urgello y Basa and Telesfora Sarmiento y Canarias on April 22, 1875. He became a lawyer on October 7, 1907 and owned big real estate properties in Cebu City. The street that was named after him used to be his private property and was previously known as Private Road.

== Career ==
He practiced law and was considered a prominent lawyer in his time.

His political career began when Filemon Sotto resigned from his position as Congressman of the 3rd district and ran for a seat in the Senate. A special congressional election was held and Urgello was elected to finish Sotto's term in the 3rd Philippine Legislature. Urgello would be reelected for another term in 1916 and again in 1919. He served as Congressman until 1922.

On October 2, 1939, then President Manuel L. Quezon appointed him as member of the Board of Tax Appeals for Cebu City.

He died on May 3, 1952.

== Historical commemoration ==
- The Vicente S. Urgello Street was named in his honor. It starts from Barangay Sambag I and ends at the Sergio Osmeña Boulevard.
