= San Fernando, Cebu =

Municipality in Cebu, Philippines

San Fernando
- Municipality
- Municipality of San Fernando
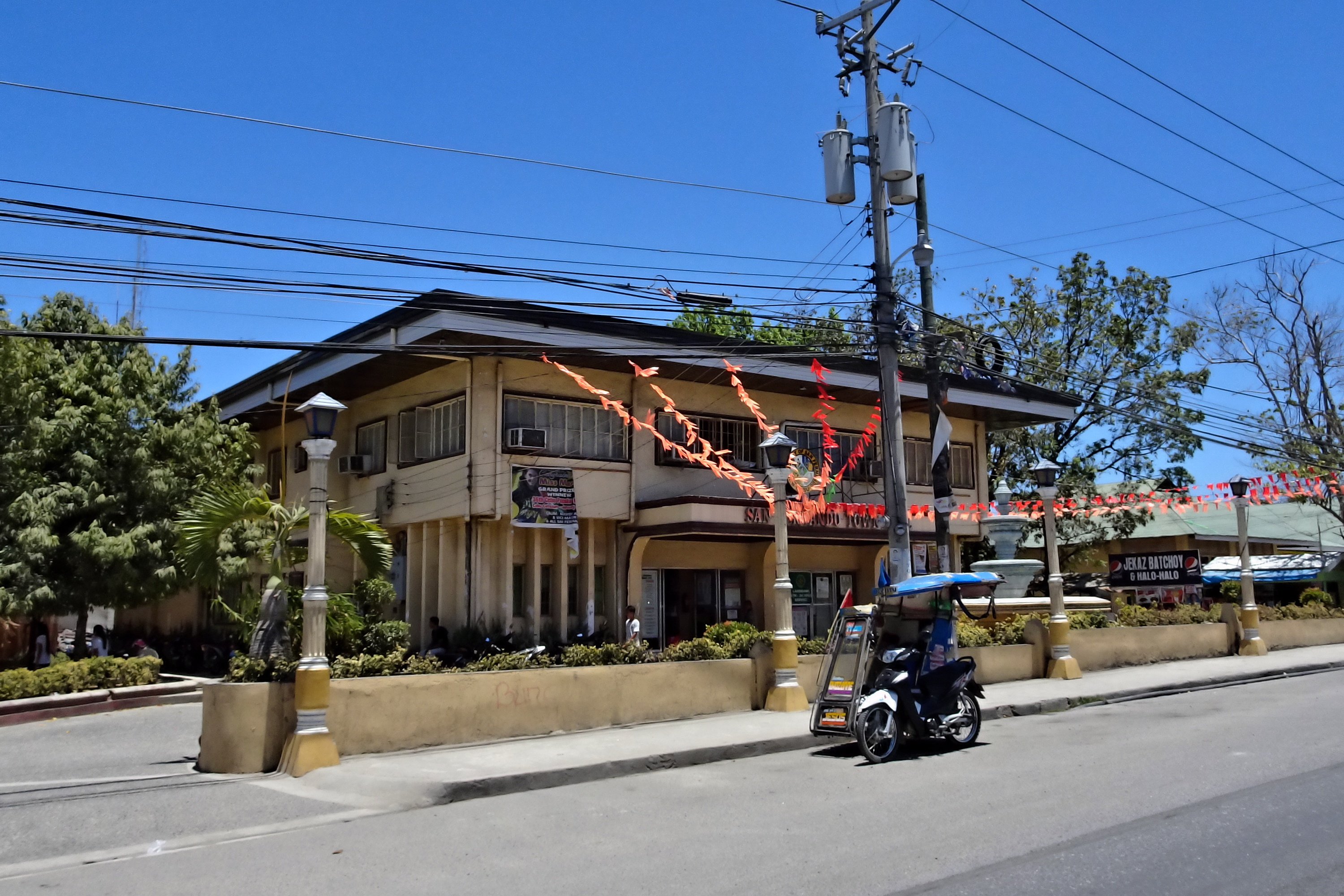
- San Fernando Municipal Hall

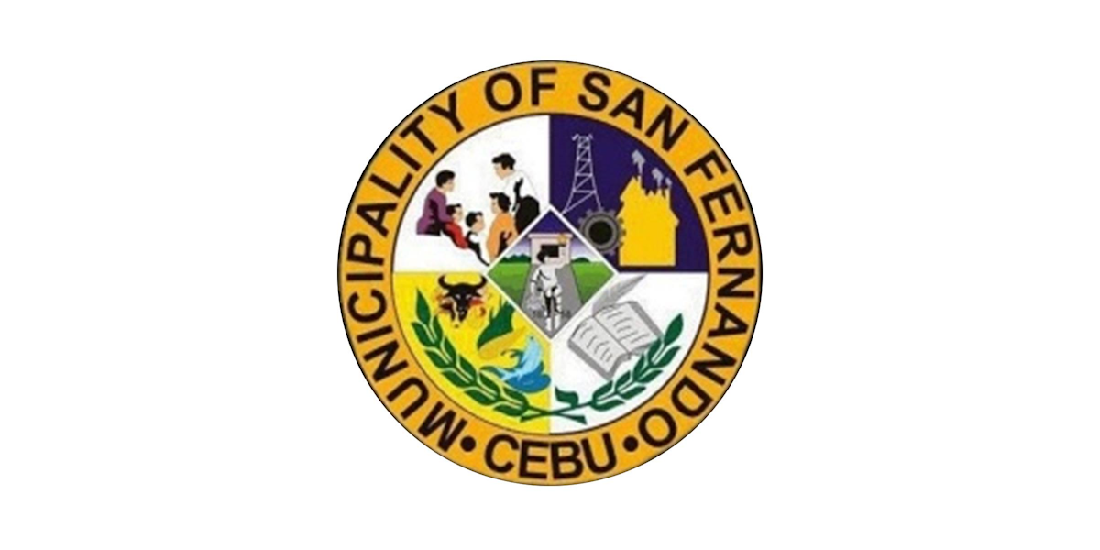
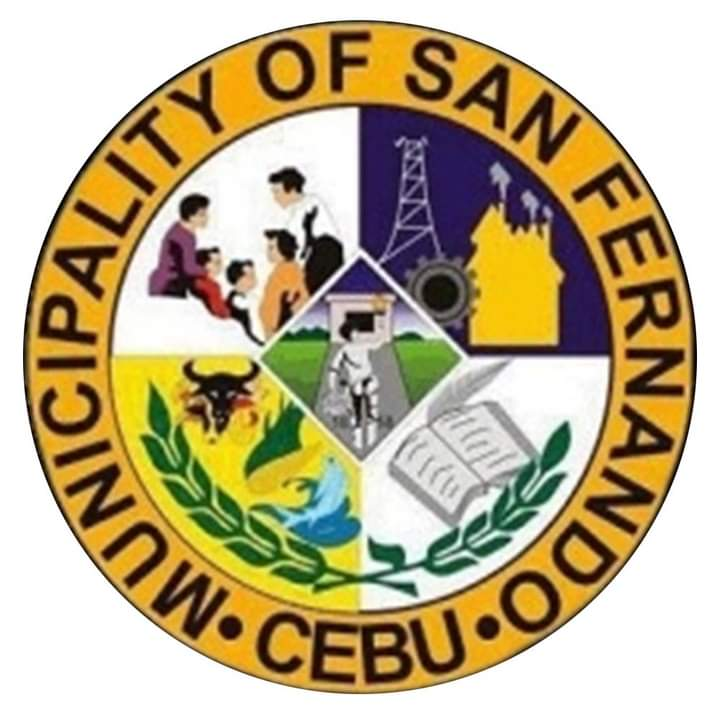
- Flag Seal
- Nickname: The Land of Heroic Waves
- Motto: On the Go San Fernando
- Anthem: San Fernando, Cebu hymn
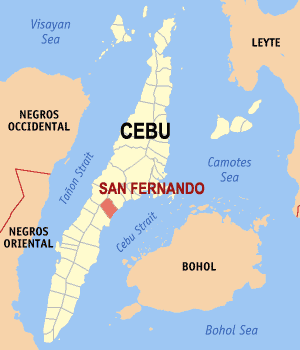
- Map of Cebu with San Fernando highlighted
- Interactive map of San Fernando
- Location within the Philippines
- Coordinates: 10°10′N 123°42′E
- Country: Philippines
- Region: Central Visayas
- Province: Cebu
- District: 1st district
- Founded: 1858
- Barangays: 21 (see Barangays)

Government
  - Type: Sangguniang Bayan
  - Mayor: Mytha Ann B. Canoy (NP)
  - Vice Mayor: Eugema V. Bacalla (NP)
  - Representative: Rhea Mae A. Gullas
  - Municipal Council: Members: Philip Jude Medalla; Rizza Jessica Canoy-Osmeña; Jovelita A. Aratia; Carlos B. Canoy; Juvy M. Procianos; Sulpicio R. Alguire; Cocoy Enad; Liberato T. Manlosa
  - Electorate: 51,416 voters (2025)

Area
  - Total: 69.39 km^{2} (26.79 sq mi)
- Elevation: 85 m (279 ft)
- Highest elevation: 401 m (1,316 ft)
- Lowest elevation: 0 m (0 ft)

Population (2024 census)
  - Total: 76,110
  - Density: 1,097/km^{2} (2,841/sq mi)
  - Households: 16,555

Economy
  - Income class: 1st municipal income class
  - Poverty incidence: 24.02% (2023)
  - Revenue: ₱ 350.3 million (2024)
  - Assets: ₱ 1,035 million (2024)
  - Expenditure: ₱ 237.6 million (2024)
  - Liabilities: ₱ 91.52 million (2024)

Service provider
  - Electricity: Visayan Electric Company (VECO)
- Time zone: UTC+8 (PST)
- ZIP code: 6018
- PSGC: 072241000
- IDD : area code: +63 (0)32
- Native languages: Cebuano; Tagalog

San Fernando, officially the Municipality of San Fernando (Cebuano: Lungsod sa San Fernando; Tagalog: Bayan ng San Fernando), is a municipality in the province of Cebu, Philippines. According to the 2024 census, it has a population of 76,110 people.

== History ==
The town was established in 1858 following the separation of the barrios of Magsico, Cabatbatan, Balungag, Sangat, Panadtaran, and Pitalo from Naga, with an initial population of nearly 3,000 people. The town was initially named San Isidro Labrador before changing to San Fernando in honor of a well-liked priest, Father Fernando Sanchez and his namesake saint.

== Geography ==
San Fernando is bordered to the north by the City of Naga, to the west is the town of Pinamungajan, to the east is the Cebu Strait, and to the south is the city of Carcar. It is 29 kilometres (18 mi) from Cebu City.

San Fernando lies within Metro Cebu.

=== Barangays ===
San Fernando is politically subdivided into 21 barangays. Each barangay consists of puroks and some have sitios.

PSGC	Barangay	Population			±% p.a.	
		2024		2010		
072241002	Balud	5.4%	4,135	3,525	▴	1.11%
072241003	Balungag	2.8%	2,116	1,855	▴	0.92%
072241005	Basak	1.3%	1,017	1,009	▴	0.05%
072241007	Bugho	1.7%	1,317	1,367	▾	−0.26%
072241008	Cabatbatan	2.5%	1,933	1,875	▴	0.21%
072241009	Green Hills	3.3%	2,508	2,700	▾	−0.51%
072241024	Ilaya	2.6%	1,975	1,918	▴	0.20%
072241010	Lantawan	2.7%	2,054	1,789	▴	0.96%
072241011	Liburon	1.3%	995	1,009	▾	−0.10%
072241012	Magsico	2.9%	2,188	2,188	Steady	0.00%
072241014	Panadtaran	7.1%	5,400	4,971	▴	0.58%
072241015	Pitalo	10.5%	7,962	7,311	▴	0.59%
072241013	Poblacion North	5.8%	4,444	4,205	▴	0.38%
072241018	Poblacion South	10.9%	8,294	7,352	▴	0.84%
072241016	San Isidro	5.4%	4,128	3,691	▴	0.78%
072241017	Sangat	7.8%	5,910	5,597	▴	0.38%
072241019	Tabionan	2.8%	2,147	1,873	▴	0.95%
072241020	Tananas	2.2%	1,706	1,345	▴	1.66%
072241021	Tinubdan	2.9%	2,215	1,994	▴	0.73%
072241022	Tonggo	2.8%	2,110	1,936	▴	0.60%
072241023	Tubod	2.3%	1,726	1,460	▴	1.17%
	Total		76,110	60,970	▴	1.55%

=== Climate ===
Climate data for San Fernando, Cebu
Month	Jan	Feb	Mar	Apr	May	Jun	Jul	Aug	Sep	Oct	Nov	Dec	Year
Mean daily maximum °C (°F)	28 (82)	29 (84)	30 (86)	31 (88)	31 (88)	30 (86)	30 (86)	30 (86)	30 (86)	29 (84)	29 (84)	28 (82)	30 (85)
Mean daily minimum °C (°F)	23 (73)	23 (73)	23 (73)	24 (75)	25 (77)	25 (77)	25 (77)	25 (77)	25 (77)	25 (77)	24 (75)	23 (73)	24 (75)
Average precipitation mm (inches)	70 (2.8)	49 (1.9)	62 (2.4)	78 (3.1)	138 (5.4)	201 (7.9)	192 (7.6)	185 (7.3)	192 (7.6)	205 (8.1)	156 (6.1)	111 (4.4)	1,639 (64.6)
Average rainy days	13.4	10.6	13.1	14.5	24.2	27.9	28.4	27.7	27.1	27.4	22.5	15.9	252.7
Source: Meteoblue

== Demographics ==
Population census of San Fernando
Year	Pop.	±% p.a.
1903	15,451	—
1918	20,029	+1.75%
1939	17,562	−0.62%
1948	16,132	−0.94%
1960	19,061	+1.40%
1970	24,073	+2.36%
1975	25,877	+1.46%
1980	28,324	+1.82%
1990	35,051	+2.15%
1995	38,700	+1.87%
2000	48,235	+4.83%
2007	54,932	+1.81%
2010	60,970	+3.87%
2015	66,280	+1.60%
2020	72,224	+1.82%
2024	76,110	+1.27%
Source: Philippine Statistics Authority

== Infrastructure ==
San Fernando is home to the PHIVOLCS Visayas Cluster Monitoring Center for Earthquake and Tsunami located in Purok 11-Santan, Barangay North Poblacion.

== Economy ==
Poverty incidence of San Fernando (%)

Source: Philippine Statistics Authority

In July 2024, Secretary Alfredo Pascual and Mayor Mytha Ann B. Canoy graced Taiheiyo Cement Philippines, Inc.'s inauguration of a PHP12.8 billion (US$220) production line in San Fernando. It has a capacity of 3 Mt annually, or 6000 tons per day of cement clinker and features advanced cement kiln renewal technology.

== Education ==
The public schools in the town of San Fernando are administered by one school district under the Schools Division of Cebu Province.

Elementary schools:

- Balud Elementary School — Balud
- Balungag Elementary School — Balungag
- Basak Elementary School — Basak
- Bolocboloc Elementary School — Sitio Bolocboloc, Sangat
- Greenhills Elementary School — Greenhills
- Liburon Elementary School — Liburon
- Magsico Elementary School — Magsico
- Pitalo Elementary School — Pitalo
- San Fernando North Central Elementary School — North Poblacion
- South Poblacion Elementary School — South Poblacion
- San Isidro Elementary School — San Isidro
- Sangat Elementary School — Sangat
- Tañañas Elementary School — Tañañas
- Tubod Elementary School — Tubod

High schools:

- Balud National High School — Balud
- Balungag National High School — Balungag
- Greenhills National High School — Greenhills
- Magsico National High School — Magsico
- Pitalo National High School — Pitalo
- Sangat National High School — Sangat
- San Fernando National High School — South Poblacion
- San Fernando Open & Night High School — North Poblacion
- South Poblacion National High School - Math & Science School — South Poblacion
- Tubod National High School — Tubod

Integrated schools:

- Bugho Integrated School — Bugho
- Cabatbatan Integrated School — Cabatbatan
- Ciriaco V. Paradela Integrated School — Tinubdan
- Ilaya Integrated School — Ilaya
- Lantawan Integrated School — Lantawan
- Panadtaran Integrated School — Panadtaran
- Tabionan Integrated School — Tabionan
- Tonggo Integrated School — Tonggo

== Notable personalities ==
- Beatrice Gomez
- Jessica Villarubin

== Sources ==
- Sun Star Cebu, CYR (8 October 2005). "RDC enlarges Metro Cebu". Archived from the original on 11 March 2007.
