= Naga, Cebu =

Component city in Cebu, Philippines

Naga
- Component city
- City of Naga
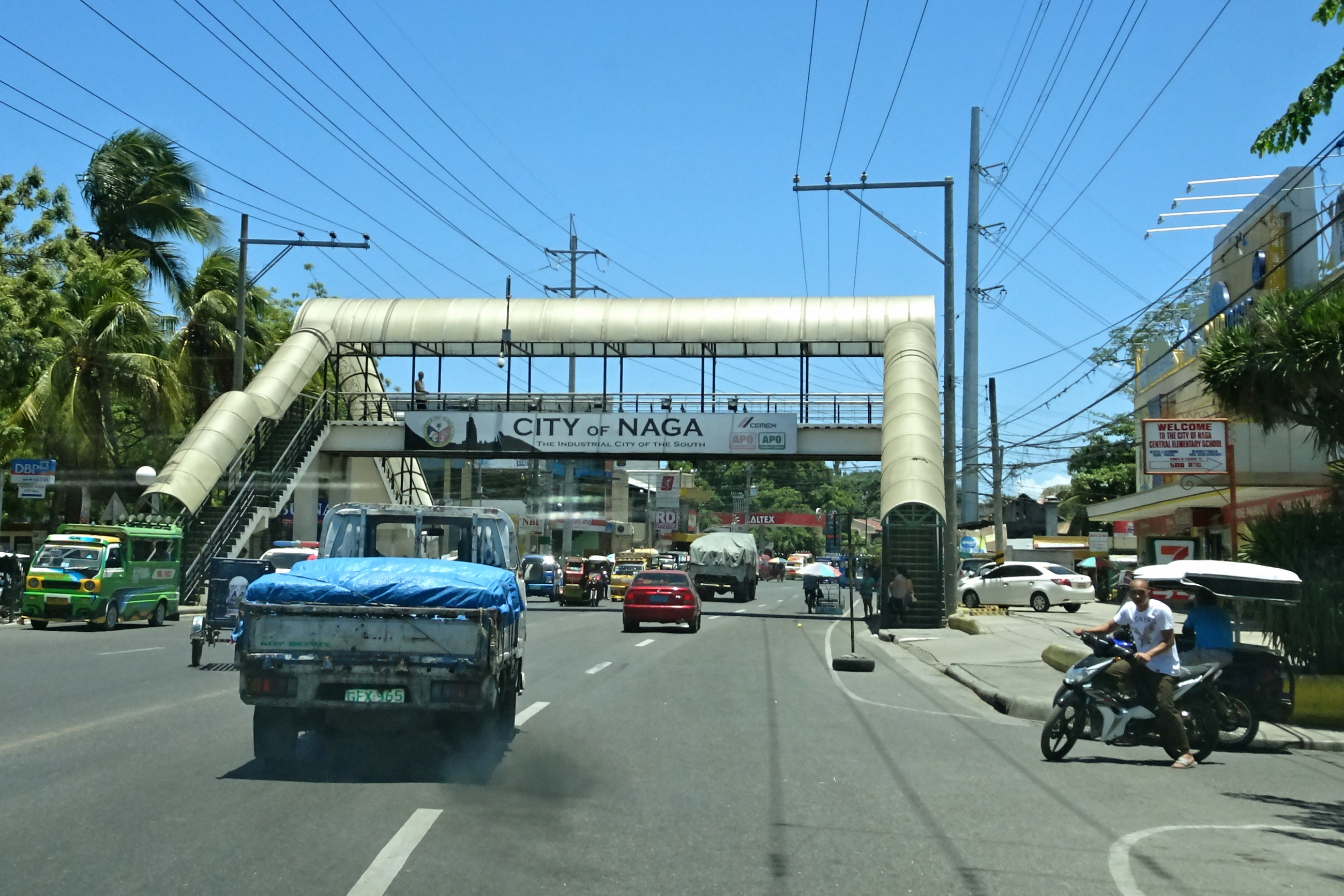
- Highway in Naga

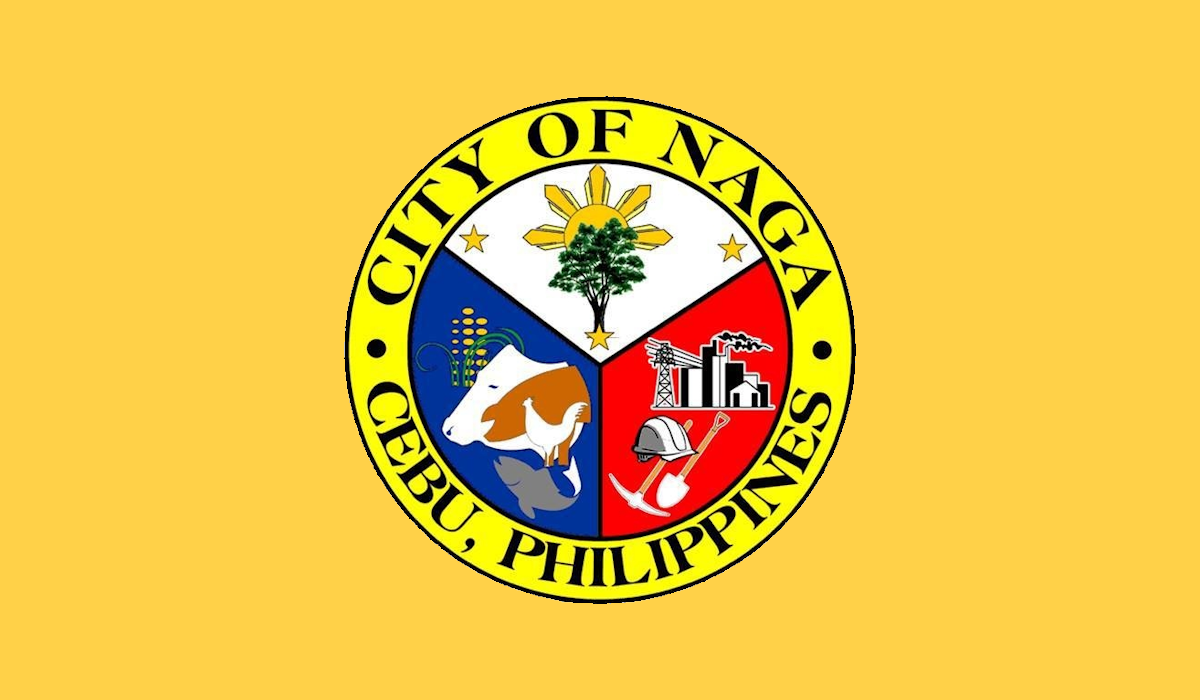
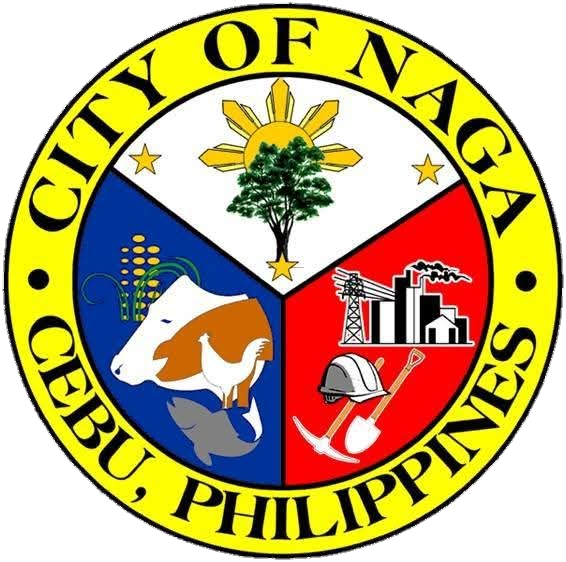
- Flag Seal
- Nickname: The Industrial Hub of Southern Cebu
- Mottoes: Naga atong garbo Service with a Heart; The Naga of Visayas
- Anthem: Mahal Kong Naga (My Beloved Naga)
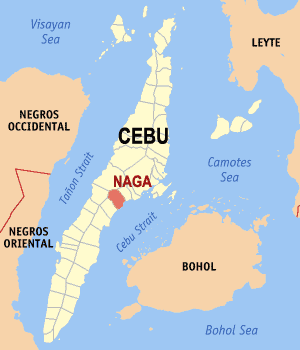
- Map of Cebu with Naga highlighted
- Interactive map of Naga
- Location within the Philippines
- Coordinates: 10°13′N 123°45′E
- Country: Philippines
- Region: Central Visayas
- Province: Cebu
- District: 1st district
- Founded: 1785
- Cityhood: September 2, 2007 (Lost cityhood in 2008 and 2010)
- Lost cityhood: 2008 and 2010
- Affirmed cityhood: February 15, 2011
- Barangays: 28 (see Barangays)

Government
  - Type: Sangguniang Panlungsod
  - Mayor: Valdemar M. Chiong (NP)
  - Vice Mayor: Virgilio M. Chiong (NP)
  - Representative: Rhea Mae A. Gullas (Lakas)
  - City Council: Members: Clint Isidro A. Chiong; Alexander R. Lara; Dominador A. Libor; Aniceto B. Alinsonorin; Carmelino N. Cruz, Jr.; Charmaine R. Navarro; Elmer John R. Lapitan; Justino L. Dakay; Ray A. Manabat; Letecia F. Abangan; Scott Juvenal A. Chiong ^{‡}; Faith James Servano ^{◌}; ‡ ex officio ABC president; ◌ ex officio SK chairman
  - Electorate: 86,935 voters (2025)

Area
  - Total: 101.97 km^{2} (39.37 sq mi)
- Elevation: 105 m (344 ft)
- Highest elevation: 819 m (2,687 ft)
- Lowest elevation: 0 m (0 ft)

Population (2024 census)
  - Total: 138,727
  - Density: 1,360.5/km^{2} (3,523.6/sq mi)
  - Households: 32,011

Economy
  - Income class: 3rd city income class
  - Poverty incidence: 20.57% (2023)
  - Revenue: ₱ 1,499 million (2024)
  - Assets: ₱ 5,428 million (2024)
  - Expenditure: ₱ 666.7 million (2024)
  - Liabilities: ₱ 1,826 million (2024)

Service provider
  - Electricity: Visayan Electric Company (VECO)
- Time zone: UTC+8 (PST)
- ZIP code: 6037
- PSGC: 072234000
- IDD : area code: +63 (0)32
- Native language: Cebuano
- Website: www.cityofnagacebu.gov.ph

Naga, officially the City of Naga (Cebuano: Dakbayan sa Naga; Filipino: Lungsod ng Naga), is a component city in the province of Cebu, Philippines. According to the 2024 census, it has a population of 138,727 people.

It is one of the two Philippine cities named Naga, the other being Naga, Camarines Sur in Luzon.

== History ==
=== Colonial Era ===
Saint Francis of Assisi church the Parish church of Naga, Cebu. According to Alicia M. L. Coseteng, it has incorporated Christianized-Islamic Filipino Mudejar Style into this Catholic church.

Naga was previously named by the first settlers as Narra due to the abundance of narra trees. And in Naga City at Bicol, The Narra Trees are associated with the more serpentine and Dragon-like Naga of Sanskrit origin wherein Narra Trees' roots are very serpentlike. The name eventually became Naga. Naga became a municipality on June 12, 1829. It was partitioned from San Nicolas, now part of Cebu City. The original barrios are Inayagan, Tinaan, Langtad, Pandan, Cantag-an, Lutac, Uling, and Alpaco.

Soon after, Spanish authorities discovered coal in the upland barangays of Uling and Lutac. However, mines were developed intermittently. In 1901, during American occupation, the Uling-Lutac coal and rail concession (also known as the Macleod concession) was identified as one of the three coal mines in Cebu that the government wanted to develop further.

In 1921, the Philippine government established the first cement plant in the country in Tinaan, Naga. It was called Cebu Portland Cement Company (CEPOC). Today, the plant still exists and able to produce 3.8 million metric tons (MMT) of cement per year. It is now known as the APO Cement Plant.

During World War II, around three-quarters of the town was destroyed.

=== Post-war Era ===
The manufacturing and industrial sector continued to grow in Naga. The Naga Coal Plant was established in 1981. It was the first grid-connected coal plant in the country and was built for the National Power Corporation. It had a capacity of 105 MW up to its retirement in 2015.

=== Cityhood ===
Cityhood was ratified in a plebiscite on September 2, 2007. The Supreme Court declared the cityhood law of Naga and 15 other cities unconstitutional after a petition filed by the League of Cities of the Philippines in its ruling on November 18, 2008. On December 22, 2009, the cityhood law of Naga and 15 other municipalities regain its status as cities again after the court reversed its ruling November 18, 2008 ruling.

On August 23, 2010, the court reinstated its ruling on November 18, 2008, making Naga and 15 other cities regular municipalities. Finally, on February 15, 2011, Naga and the other 15 municipalities declared that the conversion to cityhood met all legal requirements. In 2013, after six years of legal battle, in its board resolution the League of Cities of the Philippines acknowledged and recognized the cityhood of Naga and 15 other cities on July 19, 2013.

== Geography ==
Naga City is bordered to the north by the town of Minglanilla, to the west is the city of Toledo, to the east is the Cebu Strait, and to the south is the town of San Fernando. It is 21 kilometres (13 mi) from Cebu City.

It lies within the Cebu metropolitan area.

=== Barangays ===
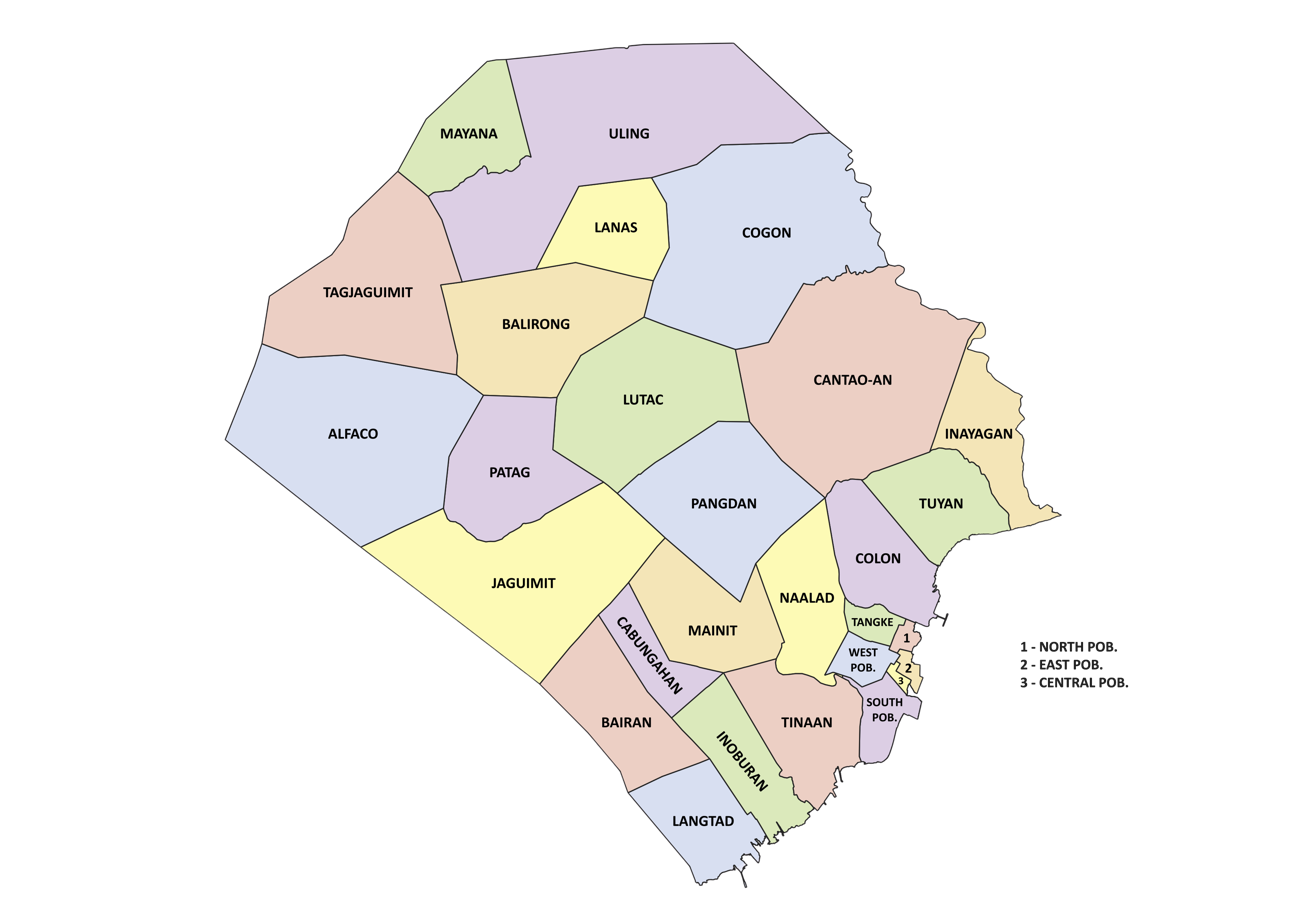
Political map of Naga

Naga is politically subdivided into 28 barangays. Each barangay consists of puroks and some have sitios.

PSGC	Barangay	Population			±% p.a.	
		2024		2010		
0772234001	Alpaco	2.5%	3,486	2,921	▴	1.23%
0772234002	Bairan	1.6%	2,173	1,772	▴	1.42%
0772234003	Balirong	3.4%	4,760	3,918	▴	1.36%
0772234004	Cabungahan	0.9%	1,306	1,176	▴	0.73%
0772234005	Cantao‑an	4.2%	5,889	5,133	▴	0.96%
0772234006	Central Poblacion	0.6%	896	933	▾	−0.28%
0772234007	Cogon	3.1%	4,267	3,583	▴	1.22%
0772234008	Colon	3.2%	4,467	4,227	▴	0.38%
0772234009	East Poblacion	0.5%	636	544	▴	1.09%
0772234011	Inayagan	6.0%	8,342	7,832	▴	0.44%
0772234010	Inoburan	4.4%	6,054	5,104	▴	1.19%
0772234012	Jaguimit	1.7%	2,344	2,071	▴	0.86%
0772234013	Lanas	2.1%	2,890	2,374	▴	1.37%
0772234014	Langtad	4.5%	6,220	6,900	▾	−0.72%
0772234015	Lutac	3.3%	4,603	3,879	▴	1.19%
0772234016	Mainit	2.0%	2,770	2,695	▴	0.19%
0772234017	Mayana	0.9%	1,299	1,295	▴	0.02%
0772234018	Naalad	2.1%	2,937	2,700	▴	0.58%
0772234019	North Poblacion	2.2%	3,019	2,866	▴	0.36%
0772234020	Pangdan	3.4%	4,730	4,643	▴	0.13%
0772234021	Patag	1.0%	1,419	1,167	▴	1.36%
0772234022	South Poblacion	4.1%	5,673	4,459	▴	1.68%
0772234023	Tagjaguimit	1.7%	2,317	2,302	▴	0.05%
0772234024	Tangke	3.8%	5,263	4,652	▴	0.86%
0772234025	Tinaan	5.2%	7,157	4,129	▴	3.88%
0772234027	Tuyan	8.2%	11,337	10,705	▴	0.40%
0772234028	Uling	4.5%	6,187	4,470	▴	2.28%
0772234029	West Poblacion	2.4%	3,309	3,121	▴	0.41%
	Total		138,727	101,571	▴	2.18%

=== Climate ===
Climate data for Naga, Cebu
Month	Jan	Feb	Mar	Apr	May	Jun	Jul	Aug	Sep	Oct	Nov	Dec	Year
Mean daily maximum °C (°F)	28 (82)	29 (84)	30 (86)	31 (88)	31 (88)	30 (86)	30 (86)	30 (86)	30 (86)	29 (84)	29 (84)	28 (82)	30 (85)
Mean daily minimum °C (°F)	23 (73)	23 (73)	23 (73)	24 (75)	25 (77)	25 (77)	25 (77)	25 (77)	25 (77)	25 (77)	24 (75)	23 (73)	24 (75)
Average precipitation mm (inches)	70 (2.8)	49 (1.9)	62 (2.4)	78 (3.1)	138 (5.4)	201 (7.9)	192 (7.6)	185 (7.3)	192 (7.6)	205 (8.1)	156 (6.1)	111 (4.4)	1,639 (64.6)
Average rainy days	13.4	10.6	13.1	14.5	24.2	27.9	28.4	27.7	27.1	27.4	22.5	15.9	252.7
Source: Meteoblue

== Demographics ==
City Hall

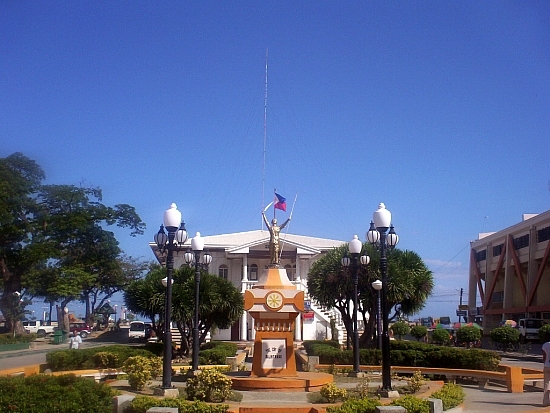
Bonifacio Park

Population census of Naga
Year	Pop.	±% p.a.
1903	16,884	—
1918	21,166	+1.52%
1939	25,850	+0.96%
1948	24,911	−0.41%
1960	32,475	+2.23%
1970	35,043	+0.76%
1975	38,242	+1.77%
1980	45,831	+3.69%
1990	60,425	+2.80%
1995	69,010	+2.52%
2000	80,189	+3.27%
2007	95,163	+2.39%
2010	101,571	+2.40%
2015	115,750	+2.52%
2020	133,184	+3.00%
2024	138,727	+0.98%
Source: Philippine Statistics Authority

== Economy ==
Poverty incidence of Naga (%)

Source: Philippine Statistics Authority

Naga is home to several heavy industries, and as such, the city bills itself as the Industrial City of the South. Among the industries in Naga are the Apo Cement Corporation, the largest factory in the country, producing 4,000 metric tons (3,900 long tons) per day; FSP Group; the 290-megawatt KEPCO Philippines Corporation power plant; MRC Allied Industries; Pryce Gases, Inc.; Rikio Southeast Asia; the 147-megawatt coal-fired Salcon Power Corporation plant; Asian Grains Corporation, a flour milling company; Sugbo ACS Food Manufacturing Corporation, the maker of Ichipan bread; UNAHCO Feeds, Inc.; and Provera Nutritional Solutions Corp. (feedmill), among other industries.

The Naga Valley Industrial Park (NAVA) is a 36 ha (89 acres) Philippine Economic Zone Authority (PEZA)-registered industrial park in Barangay Cantao-an. Locators in NAVA include Cebu Mitsumi, Inc., Kyocera Kinseki Philippines, Inc., and Tokyo Microshaft Corporation. The industrial park was a part of the 250 ha (620 acres) New Cebu Township One (NCTO) of MRC Allied before it was acquired by Cebu City-based developer Primary Properties Corporation.

== Sports venues ==
In December 2015, the Naga City government officially opened the Teodoro Mendiola Sports Field and Oval, located along West Poblacion. Its inauguration was in time for its usage as the main venue for the 2016 Central Visayas Regional Athletic Association (CVIRAA) games in February. The ₱68 million project comprises a track and field oval, swimming pool (Olympic-sized), and basketball, tennis, and volleyball courts.

In 2017, the city again hosted the CVIRAA, becoming the first host to hold the event in consecutive years at the venue.

== Sources ==
- Philippine Global, Bernard Supetran (June 25, 2012). "Economic boom brings prosperity to Cebu's new cities". Archived from the original on December 22, 2015.
- Sun.Star, Justin K. Vestil (December 14, 2015). "Naga opens P152.5M in infra, including track for runners". Archived from the original on December 14, 2015.
- Sun.Star, Richiel S. Chavez (February 11, 2017). "2017 Cviraa goes full swing today". Archived from the original on March 10, 2017.
