= List of members of the House of Representatives of the Philippines (O) =

This is a complete list of past and present members of the House of Representatives of the Philippines whose last names begin with the letter O.

This list also includes members of the Philippine Assembly (1907–1916), the Commonwealth National Assembly (1935–1941), the Second Republic National Assembly (1943–1944) and the Batasang Pambansa (1978–1986).

== Oa ==
- Ando Oaminal, member for Misamis Occidental's 2nd district (2022–present)
- Henry Oaminal, member for Misamis Occidental's 2nd district (2013–2022)
- Henry Oaminal Jr., member for Asenso Pinoy party-list (2025–present)

== Ob ==
- Crispin Oben, member for Laguna's 2nd district (1907–1909)
- Honesto Obias, member for Camarines Sur's 2nd district (1919–1922)
- Vicente Obieta, member for Samar's 1st district (1909–1912)
- Reena Concepcion Obillo, member for Una Ang Pamilya party-list (2010–2013)
- Alfonso Oboza, member for Davao (1943–1944)

== Oc ==
- Roberto Oca Jr., member for Region IV (1978–1984)
- Felicisimo Ocampo, member for Nueva Ecija's 2nd district (1957–1965)
- Julian Ocampo, member for Ambos Camarines's 2nd district (1912–1916)
- Macario Ocampo, member for Pampanga's 2nd district (1928–1931)
- Pablo Ocampo, member for Manila's 2nd district (1909–1912)
- Pablo V. Ocampo, member for Manila's 4th district (1965–1972), and Manila's 6th district (1987–1992)
- Rosenda Ann Ocampo, member for Manila's 6th district (1992–2001, 2010–2019)
- Satur Ocampo, member for Bayan Muna party-list (2001–2010)
- Vicente Ocampo, member for Laguna's 1st district (1919–1922)
- Loreto Leo Ocampos, member for Misamis Occidental's 2nd district (2010–2013)
- Elisa Ochoa, member for Agusan (1943–1944, 1945–1946)

== Od ==
- Nat Oducado, member for 1Tahanan party-list (2025–2026)

== Oj ==
- Dionisio Ojeda, sectoral member (1987–1992)

== Ol ==
- Arrel Olaño, member for Davao del Norte's 1st district (2001–2010)
- Khymer Adan Olaso, member for Zamboanga City's 1st district (2022–2025)
- Arturo Olegario Sr., sectoral member (1987–1998)
- Edwin Olivarez, member for Parañaque's 1st district (2010–2013, 2022–2025)
- Eric Olivarez, member for Parañaque's 1st district (2013–2022, 2025–present)

== On ==
- Emil Ong, member for Northern Samar's 2nd district (2007–2016)
- Jose Ong Jr., member for Northern Samar's 2nd district (1987–1992, 2019–2022)
- Ronnie Ong, member for Ang Probinsyano party-list (2019–2022)
- Edwin Ongchuan, member for Northern Samar's 2nd district (2016–2019, 2025–present)
- Harris Ongchuan, member for Northern Samar's 2nd district (2022–2025)
- Roberto Ongpin, Cabinet member (1978–1984)

== Op ==
- Felix Opimo, member for Samar's 3rd district (1945–1946)
- Blas Ople, member for Region III (1978–1984), and Bulacan (1984–1986)
- Tomas Oppus, member for Leyte's 2nd district (1922–1931), and Leyte's 3rd district (1931–1941, 1945–1946)

== Or ==
- Oscar Orbos, member for Pangasinan's 1st district (1987–1995)
- Rodolfo Ordanes, member for Senior Citizens party-list (2020–present)
- Eusebio Orense, member for Batangas's 2nd district (1907–1909, 1935–1941, 1945–1946)
- John Orola Jr., member for Bacolod (1998–2001)
- Antolin Oreta III, member for Malabon (2025–present)
- Francisco Ortega, member for La Union's 1st district (1934–1935, 1945–1949, 1953–1965)
- Francisco Ortega III, member for Abono party-list (2009–2016)
- Joaquin Ortega, member for La Union's 1st district (1969–1972), Region I (1978–1984), and La Union (1984–1986)
- Manuel Ortega, member for La Union's 1st district (1998–2007)
- Pablo Ortega, member for La Union's 1st district (2016–2022)
- Paolo Ortega, member for La Union's 1st district (2022–present)
- Victor Francisco Ortega, member for La Union's 1st district (1987–1998, 2007–2016)
- Vini Nola Ortega, member for Abono party-list (2016–2019)
- Augusto Ortiz, member for Region V (1978–1984), and Sorsogon (1984–1986)
- Mauro Ortiz, member for La Union's 2nd district (1922–1925)
- Montano Ortiz, member for Surigao (1925–1931)

== Os ==
- Diogenes Osabel, member for Alagad party-list (1998–2001, 2007–2010)
- Camilo Osías, member for La Union's 1st district (1935–1938)
- John Henry Osmeña, member for Cebu's 2nd district (1969–1972), and Cebu's 3rd district (1995–1998)
- Sergio Osmeña, member for Cebu's 2nd district (1907–1922)
- Sergio Osmeña Jr., member for Cebu's 2nd district (1957–1961)
- Tomas Osmeña, member for Cebu's 2nd district (2010–2013)

== Oz ==
- José Ozámiz, member for Misamis Occidental (1931–1941)
- Julio Ozamiz, member for Misamis Occidental's 1st district (1987–1992)
