= 2nd National Assembly of the Philippines =

15th legislative term of the Philippines

←	1st National Assembly	National Assembly (Second Republic)	→
- Old Legislative Building (c. 1988)

Overview
- Term: January 24, 1939 – December 16, 1941
- President: Manuel L. Quezon
- Vice President: Sergio Osmeña

National Assembly
- Members: 98
- Speaker: Jose Yulo
- Speaker pro tempore: Jose Zulueta
- Majority leader: Quintin Paredes

The 2nd National Assembly of the Philippines (Filipino: Ikalawang Asembleyang Pambansa ng Pilipinas) was the meeting of the legislature of the Commonwealth of the Philippines, from January 24, 1939, until December 16, 1941, during the fourth, fifth, and sixth years of Manuel L. Quezon's presidency.

== Sessions ==
- First Regular Session: January 24 – June 17, 1939
- First Special Session: August 15 – September 18, 1939
- Second Special Session: September 25 – 29, 1939
- Third Special Session: November 2 – 14, 1939
- Second Regular Session: January 22 – May 8, 1940
- Fourth Special Session: July 8 – August 10, 1940
- Third Regular Session: January 27 – May 22, 1941
- Fifth Special Session: December 11 – 16, 1941

== Legislation ==
The Second National Assembly passed a total of 256 laws: Commonwealth Act No. 416 to 671.

== Party summary ==
Assembly membership

Beginning of the Assembly

End of the Assembly

	Party (shading shows control)	Total	Vacant
	Nacionalista	Total	Vacant
End of previous legislature	98	98	0
Begin	98	98	0
End	94	94	4
Final voting share	95.9%		

== Leadership ==
Speaker of the National Assembly

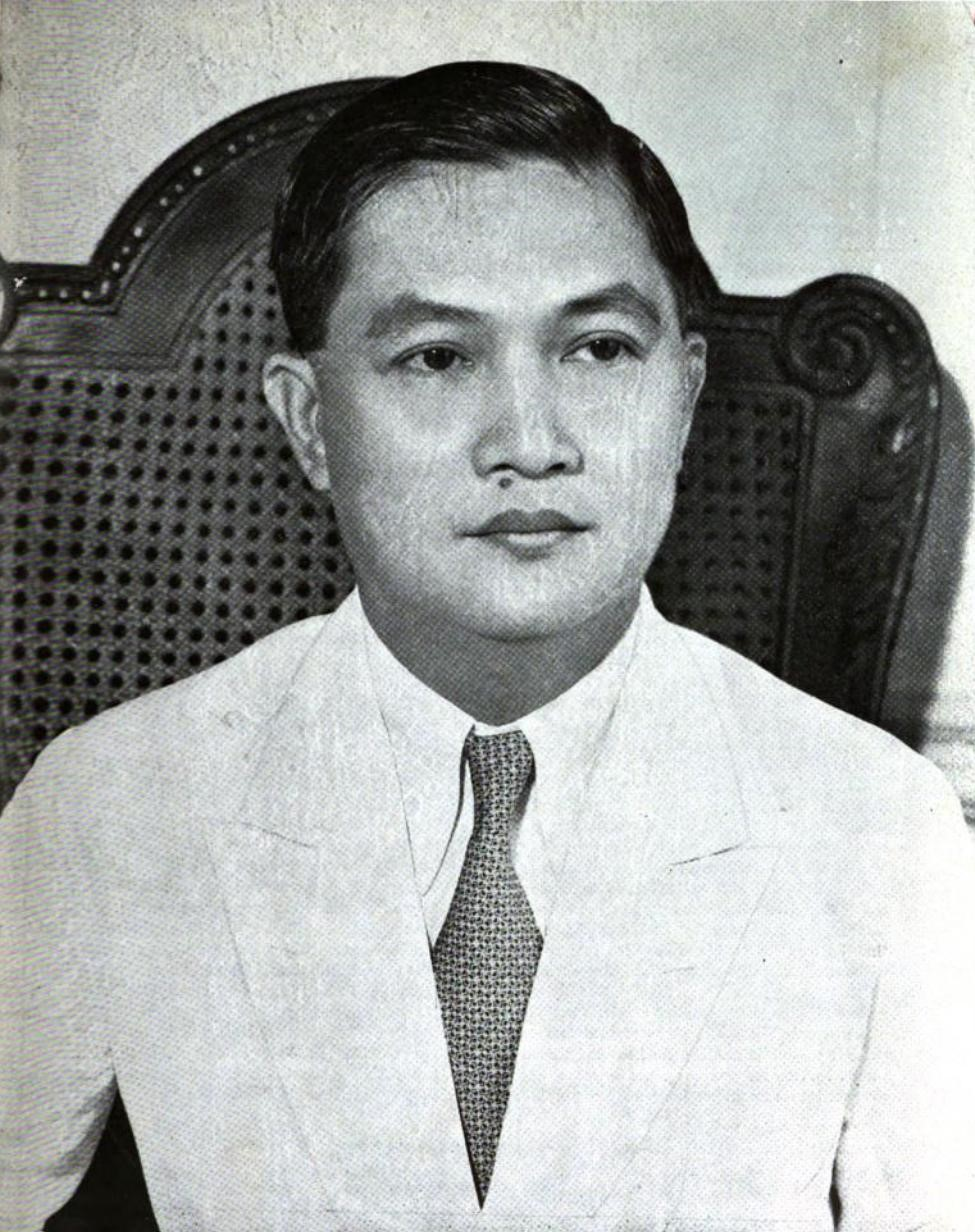
José Yulo

- Speaker: Jose Yulo (Negros Occidental–3rd, Nacionalista)
- Speaker pro tempore: Jose Zulueta (Iloilo–1st, Nacionalista)
- Floor Leader: Quintin Paredes (Abra, Nacionalista)

== Members ==
Province/City	District	Member	Party
Abra	Lone	Quintin Paredes	Nacionalista
Agusan	Lone	Apolonio D. Curato	Nacionalista
Albay	1st	Jose Bonto	Nacionalista
Albay	2nd	Justino N. Nuyda	Nacionalista
Albay	3rd	Pedro Sabido (Note: Pedro Sabido was appointed as chairman and general manager of the National Abaca and Other Fibers Corporation on November 3, 1939.)	Nacionalista
Albay	3rd	Marcial O. Rañola (Note: Marcial O. Rañola was elected on December 10, 1940, to succeed Pedro Sabido.)	Nacionalista
Albay	4th	Pedro Vera	Nacionalista
Antique	Lone	Calixto Zaldivar	Nacionalista
Bataan	Lone	Teodoro Camacho	Nacionalista
Batanes	Lone	Vicente Agan	Nacionalista
Batangas	1st	Miguel Tolentino	Nacionalista
Batangas	2nd	Eusebio Orense	Nacionalista
Batangas	3rd	Maximo M. Kalaw	Nacionalista
Bohol	1st	Genaro Visarra	Nacionalista
Bohol	2nd	Olegario B. Clarin	Nacionalista
Bohol	3rd	Teofilo B. Buslon	Nacionalista
Bukidnon	Lone	Manuel Fortich	Nacionalista
Bulacan	1st	Nicolas Buendia	Nacionalista
Bulacan	2nd	Antonio Villarama	Nacionalista
Cagayan	1st	Conrado V. Singson	Nacionalista
Cagayan	2nd	Miguel P. Pio	Nacionalista
Camarines Norte	Lone	Froilan Pimentel	Nacionalista
Camarines Sur	1st	Francisco Celebrado	Nacionalista
Camarines Sur	2nd	Jose Fuentebella	Nacionalista
Capiz	1st	Ramon A. Arnaldo	Nacionalista
Capiz	2nd	Jose A. Dorado	Nacionalista
Capiz	3rd	Juan M. Reyes (Note: Juan M. Reyes died in the sinking of the SS Corregidor on December 17, 1941.)	Nacionalista
Cavite	Lone	Justiniano Montano (Note: Justiniano Montano was removed on October 11, 1939, after an electoral protest.)	Nacionalista
Cavite	Lone	Manuel S. Rojas (Note: Manuel S. Rojas replaced Justiniano Montano on November 2, 1939, after winning an electoral protest.)	Nacionalista
Cebu	1st	Tereso Dosdos	Nacionalista
Cebu	2nd	Hilario Abellana	Nacionalista
Cebu	3rd	Maximino Noel	Nacionalista
Cebu	4th	Agustin Kintanar	Nacionalista
Cebu	5th	Miguel Cuenco	Nacionalista
Cebu	6th	Miguel Raffiñan	Nacionalista
Cebu	7th	Roque Desquitado	Nacionalista
Cotabato	Lone	Ugalingan Piang	Nacionalista
Davao	Lone	Cesar M. Sotto	Nacionalista
Ilocos Norte	1st	Vicente T. Lazo	Nacionalista
Ilocos Norte	2nd	Ulpiano H. Arzadon	Nacionalista
Ilocos Sur	1st	Benito Soliven	Nacionalista
Ilocos Sur	2nd	Prospero Sanidad	Nacionalista
Iloilo	1st	Jose Zulueta	Nacionalista
Iloilo	2nd	Ruperto Montinola (Note: Ruperto Montinola died on February 10, 1940.)	Nacionalista
Iloilo	2nd	Oscar Ledesma (Note: Oscar Ledesma was elected on December 10, 1940, to succeed Ruperto Montinola.)	Nacionalista
Iloilo	3rd	Atanasio Ampig (Note: Atanasio Ampig died in the sinking of the SS Corregidor on December 17, 1941.)	Nacionalista
Iloilo	4th	Tomas Buenaflor	Nacionalista
Iloilo	5th	Victoriano M. Salcedo	Nacionalista
Isabela	Lone	Mauro Verzosa	Nacionalista
La Union	1st	Delfin Flores	Nacionalista
La Union	2nd	Eulogio P. De Guzman	Nacionalista
Laguna	1st	Tomas Dizon	Nacionalista
Laguna	2nd	Crisanto M. Guysayko	Nacionalista
Lanao	Lone	Tomas Cabili	Nacionalista
Leyte	1st	Carlos Tan	Nacionalista
Leyte	2nd	Dominador Tan	Nacionalista
Leyte	3rd	Tomas Oppus	Nacionalista
Leyte	4th	Norberto Romualdez (Note: Norberto Romualdez died on November 4, 1941.)	Nacionalista
Leyte	5th	Ruperto Kapunan (Note: Ruperto Kapunan died on February 4, 1939.)	Nacionalista
Leyte	5th	Atilano R. Cinco (Note: Atilano R. Cinco was elected on December 10, 1940, to succeed Ruperto Kapunan.)	Nacionalista
Manila	1st	Gregorio Perfecto	Nacionalista
Manila	2nd	Pedro Gil	Nacionalista
Marinduque	Lone	Jose A. Uy	Nacionalista
Masbate	Lone	Pio V. Corpus	Nacionalista
Mindoro	Lone	Raul Leuterio	Nacionalista
Misamis Occidental	Lone	José Ozámiz	Nacionalista
Misamis Oriental	Lone	Isidro Vamenta	Nacionalista
Mountain Province	1st	Saturnino Moldero	Nacionalista
Mountain Province	2nd	Ramon P. Mitra	Nacionalista
Mountain Province	3rd	Miguel Gumangan	Nacionalista
Negros Occidental	1st	Enrique Magalona	Nacionalista
Negros Occidental	2nd	Pedro Hernaez	Nacionalista
Negros Occidental	3rd	Jose Yulo	Nacionalista
Negros Oriental	1st	Guillermo Z. Villanueva	Nacionalista
Negros Oriental	2nd	Jose E. Romero	Nacionalista
Nueva Ecija	1st	Manuel A. Alzate	Nacionalista
Nueva Ecija	2nd	Felipe Buencamino Jr. (Note: Felipe Buencamino Jr. resigned on March 27, 1940.)	Nacionalista
Nueva Ecija	2nd	Gabriel Belmonte (Note: Gabriel Belmonte was elected on December 10, 1940, succeeding Felipe Buencamino Jr..)	Nacionalista
Nueva Vizcaya	Lone	Guillermo Bongolan	Nacionalista
Palawan	Lone	Claudio R. Sandoval	Nacionalista
Pampanga	1st	Eligio G. Lagman	Nacionalista
Pampanga	2nd	Fausto F. Gonzales	Nacionalista
Pangasinan	1st	Anacleto B. Ramos	Nacionalista
Pangasinan	2nd	Eugenio Perez	Nacionalista
Pangasinan	3rd	Daniel Maramba (Note: Daniel Maramba died on December 28, 1941.)	Nacionalista
Pangasinan	4th	Nicomedes T. Rupisan	Nacionalista
Pangasinan	5th	Narciso Ramos	Nacionalista
Rizal	1st	Francisco Sevilla	Nacionalista
Rizal	2nd	Emilio de la Paz	Nacionalista
Romblon	Lone	Leonardo Festin	Nacionalista
Samar	1st	Agripino Escareal	Nacionalista
Samar	2nd	Pascual B. Azanza	Nacionalista
Samar	3rd	Juan L. Bocar	Nacionalista
Sorsogon	1st	Norberto Roque	Nacionalista
Sorsogon	2nd	Tomas Clemente	Nacionalista
Sulu	Lone	Gulamu Rasul	Nacionalista
Surigao	Lone	Ricardo Navarro	Nacionalista
Tarlac	1st	Jose Cojuangco	Nacionalista
Tarlac	2nd	Jose Urquico	Nacionalista
Tayabas	1st	Miguel Castillo	Nacionalista
Tayabas	2nd	Francisco Lavides	Nacionalista
Zambales	Lone	Valentin Afable	Nacionalista
Zamboanga	Lone	Juan S. Alano	Nacionalista

== Changes in membership ==
District	Incumbent				Special election	Successor		
District	Member	Party	Date	Reason	Special election	Member	Party	Date
Leyte–5th	Ruperto Kapunan	Nacionalista	February 4, 1939	Died in office	December 10, 1940	Atilano R. Cinco	Nacionalista	December 10, 1940
Cavite–Lone	Justiniano Montano	Nacionalista	October 11, 1939	Removed after an electoral protest	—N/a	Manuel S. Rojas	Nacionalista	November 2, 1939
Albay–3rd	Pedro Sabido	Nacionalista	November 3, 1939	Appointed chairman and general manager of the National Abaca and Other Fibers Corporation	December 10, 1940	Marcial O. Rañola	Nacionalista	December 10, 1940
Iloilo–2nd	Ruperto Montinola	Nacionalista	February 10, 1940	Died in office	December 10, 1940	Oscar Ledesma	Nacionalista	December 10, 1940
Nueva Ecija–2nd	Felipe Buencamino Jr.	Nacionalista	March 27, 1940	Resigned	December 10, 1940	Gabriel Belmonte	Nacionalista	December 10, 1940
Leyte–4th	Norberto Romualdez	Nacionalista	November 4, 1941	Died in office	—N/a			
Iloilo–3rd	Atanasio Ampig	Nacionalista	December 17, 1941	Died in office	—N/a			
Capiz–3rd	Juan M. Reyes	Nacionalista	December 17, 1941	Died in office	—N/a			
Pangasinan–3rd	Daniel Maramba	Nacionalista	December 28, 1941	Died in office	—N/a			

== See also ==
- National Assembly of the Philippines
- 1938 Philippine legislative election
