= 1st National Assembly of the Philippines =

14th legislative term of the Philippines

←	10th Legislature	2nd	→
- Old Legislative Building (c. 1988)

Overview
- Term: November 25, 1935 – August 15, 1938
- President: Manuel L. Quezon
- Vice President: Sergio Osmeña

National Assembly
- Members: 98
- Speaker: Gil Montilla
- Speaker pro tempore: Jose Zulueta
- Majority leader: Jose E. Romero

The 1st National Assembly of the Philippines (Filipino: Unang Asembleyang Pambansa ng Pilipinas) was the meeting of the legislature of the Commonwealth of the Philippines from November 25, 1935 until August 15, 1938, during the first three years of Manuel L. Quezon's presidency.

== Sessions ==
- First Special Session: November 25 – December 21, 1935
- First Regular Session: June 16 – October 9, 1936
- Second Special Session: August 28 – September 8, 1937
- Third Special Session: September 9, 1937
- Second Regular Session: January 24 – May 19, 1938
- Fourth Special Session: May 23 – 24, 1938
- Fifth Special Session: July 25 – August 15, 1938

== Legislation ==
The First National Assembly passed a total of 415 laws: Commonwealth Act Nos. 1 to 415.

=== Major legislation ===
- Commonwealth Act No. 1 – The National Defense Act of 1935
- Commonwealth Act No. 2 – Creation of the National Economic Council
- Commonwealth Act No. 3 – Reorganization of the Supreme Court and the Creation of the Court of Appeals
- Commonwealth Act No. 5 – Reorganization of the Executive Departments and the Creation of the Budget Commission
- Commonwealth Act No. 7 – Creation of the National Loan and Investment Board
- Commonwealth Act No. 20 – Agrarian Reform Act of 1936
- Commonwealth Act No. 34 – Setting the Date of April 30, 1937, for the Plebiscite of the Constitutional Amendments pertaining to Women's Suffrage
- Commonwealth Act No. 39 – Charter of the City of Zamboanga
- Commonwealth Act No. 51 – Charter of the City of Davao
- Commonwealth Act No. 58 – Charter of the City of Cebu
- Commonwealth Act No. 85 – Amendment to the Provincial and Municipal Appropriations Act
- Commonwealth Act No. 103 – Creation of the Court of Industrial Relations
- Commonwealth Act No. 104 – Authorizing the Secretary of Labor to Promulgate and Enforce Regulations and the Establishment of Safety Standards for Laborers and Employees working in Quarries and Mines
- Commonwealth Act No. 118 – The Philippine Livestock Promotion Fund Act of 1936
- Commonwealth Act No. 120 – The National Power Corporation Act of 1936
- Commonwealth Act No. 177 – Extension of the Civil Service Commission
- Commonwealth Act No. 184 – Creation of the Institute of National Language
- Commonwealth Act No. 186 – Creation of the Government Insurance Service System
- Commonwealth Act No. 192 – Creation of the National Produce Exchange
- Commonwealth Act No. 238 – Abolition of the Cedula or Poll Tax
- Commonwealth Act No. 234 – Appropriations for Primary Education
- Commonwealth Act No. 240 – Appropriations for New Elementary School Buildings
- Commonwealth Act No. 242 – Compensation for Lost Cedula Revenues
- Commonwealth Act No. 246 – General Appropriations Act of 1936
- Commonwealth Act No. 328 – Charter of the City of Bacolod
- Commonwealth Act No. 343 – Abolition of the State Force Police and the Re-Creation of the Philippine Constabulary
- Commonwealth Act No. 381 – Creating A Level of Three Years of Immediate Education for Children and its Appropriations

== Party summary ==
Assembly membership

Beginning of the Assembly

End of the Assembly

	Party (shading shows control)		Total	Vacant
	Democratico	Pro-Independencia	Total	Vacant
End of previous legislature	71	22	96	0
Begin	72	26	98	0
End	98 (Note: At the end of the Assembly, the Nacionalista Party, previously split into the Democratico and Democrata Pro-Independencia factions, reconciled to have a total of 98 seats under one party.)		98	0
Final voting share	75%	22.9%		
Beginning of next legislature	98			0

== Leadership ==
Speaker of the National Assembly

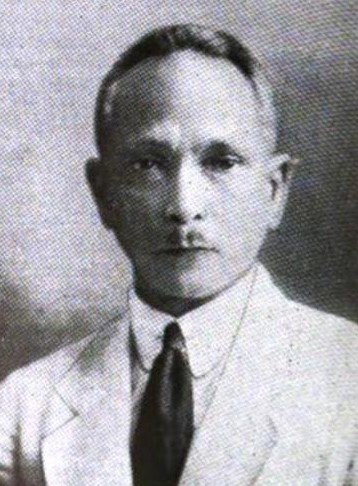
Gil Montilla

- Speaker: Gil Montilla (Negros Occidental–3rd, Nacionalista Democratico)
- Speaker pro tempore: Jose Zulueta (Iloilo–1st, Nacionalista Democratico)
- Floor Leader: Jose E. Romero (Negros Oriental–2nd, Nacionalista Democratico)

== Members ==
Province/City	District	Member	Party
Abra	Lone	Quintin Paredes (Note: Quintin Paredes was appointed as Resident Commissioner of the Philippines on January 9, 1936.)	Nacionalista Democratico
Abra	Lone	Agapito Garduque (Note: Agapito Garduque was elected on September 1, 1936, to succeed Quintin Paredes.)	Nacionalista
Agusan	Lone	Apolonio D. Curato	Nacionalista Democrata Pro-Independencia
Albay	1st	Jose Bonto	Nacionalista Democratico
Albay	2nd	Justino N. Nuyda	Nacionalista Democratico
Albay	3rd	Pedro Sabido	Nacionalista Democrata Pro-Independencia
Albay	4th	Pedro Vera	Nacionalista Democrata Pro-Independencia
Antique	Lone	Calixto Zaldivar	Nacionalista Democrata Pro-Independencia
Bataan	Lone	Teodoro Camacho	Nacionalista Democratico
Batanes	Lone	Vicente Agan	Nacionalista Democratico
Batangas	1st	Natalio Lopez (Note: Natalio Lopez was removed by the Electoral Commission on October 26, 1936, after an electoral protest.)	Nacionalista Democrata Pro-Independencia
Batangas	1st	Miguel Tolentino (Note: Miguel Tolentino replaced Natalio Lopez on October 26, 1936, after winning an electoral protest.)	Nacionalista Democrata Pro-Independencia
Batangas	2nd	Eusebio Orense	Nacionalista Democratico
Batangas	3rd	Maximo M. Kalaw	Nacionalista Democrata Pro-Independencia
Bohol	1st	Juan Torralba	Nacionalista Democratico
Bohol	2nd	Olegario B. Clarin	Nacionalista Democratico
Bohol	3rd	Margarito E. Revilles	Nacionalista Democrata Pro-Independencia
Bukidnon	Lone	Manuel Fortich	Nacionalista Democratico
Bulacan	1st	Nicolas Buendia	Nacionalista Democratico
Bulacan	2nd	Antonio Villarama	Nacionalista Democratico
Cagayan	1st	Marcelo Adduru	Nacionalista Democratico
Cagayan	2nd	Regino Veridiano	Nacionalista Democratico
Camarines Norte	Lone	Cayetano Lukban (Note: Cayetano Lukban was removed by the Electoral Commission on September 30, 1936, after an electoral protest.)	Nacionalista Democratico
Camarines Norte	Lone	Froilan Pimentel (Note: Froilan Pimentel was elected on August 3, 1937, to succeed Cayetano Lukban.)	Nacionalista Democratico
Camarines Sur	1st	Francisco Celebrado	Nacionalista Democratico
Camarines Sur	2nd	Luis N. de Leon (Note: Luis N. de Leon was removed by the Electoral Commission on May 25, 1937, after an electoral protest.)	Nacionalista Democratico
Camarines Sur	2nd	Jose Fuentebella (Note: Jose Fuentebella replaced Luis N. de Leon on May 25, 1937, after winning an electoral protest.)	Nacionalista Democrata Pro-Independencia
Capiz	1st	Manuel Roxas	Nacionalista Democrata Pro-Independencia
Capiz	2nd	Jose A. Dorado	Nacionalista Democrata Pro-Independencia
Capiz	3rd	Rafael S. Tumbokon	Nacionalista Democrata Pro-Independencia
Cavite	Lone	Justiniano Montano	Nacionalista Democratico
Cebu	1st	Celestino Rodriguez	Nacionalista Democrata Pro-Independencia
Cebu	2nd	Hilario Abellana	Nacionalista Democrata Pro-Independencia
Cebu	3rd	Agustin Kintanar	Nacionalista Democratico
Cebu	4th	Vicente Rama	Nacionalista Democratico
Cebu	5th	Miguel Cuenco	Nacionalista Democrata Pro-Independencia
Cebu	6th	Nicolas Rafols	Nacionalista Democrata Pro-Independencia
Cebu	7th	Buenaventura Rodriguez	Nacionalista Democrata Pro-Independencia
Cotabato	Lone	Datu Sinsuat Balabaran	Nacionalista Democrata Pro-Independencia
Davao	Lone	Romualdo Quimpo	Nacionalista Democratico
Ilocos Norte	1st	Vicente T. Lazo	Nacionalista Democratico
Ilocos Norte	2nd	Julio Nalundasan (Note: Member-elect Julio Nalundasan was assassinated on September 20, 1935.)	Nacionalista Democratico
Ilocos Norte	2nd	Ulpiano H. Arzadon (Note: Ulpiano H. Arzadon was elected on September 1, 1936, to succeed Julio Nalundasan.)	Nacionalista Democratico
Ilocos Sur	1st	Benito Soliven	Nacionalista Democrata Pro-Independencia
Ilocos Sur	2nd	Sixto Brillantes	Nacionalista Democratico
Iloilo	1st	Jose Zulueta	Nacionalista Democratico
Iloilo	2nd	Ruperto Montinola	Nacionalista Democrata Pro-Independencia
Iloilo	3rd	Tomas Confesor	Nacionalista Democratico
Iloilo	4th	Tomas Buenaflor	Nacionalista Democratico
Iloilo	5th	Victoriano M. Salcedo	Nacionalista Democratico
Isabela	Lone	Mauro Verzosa	Nacionalista Democratico
La Union	1st	Camilo Osias	Nacionalista Democrata Pro-Independencia
La Union	2nd	Agaton R. Yaranon	Nacionalista Democratico
Laguna	1st	Tomas Dizon	Nacionalista Democratico
Laguna	2nd	Arsenio Bonifacio	Nacionalista Democrata Pro-Independencia
Lanao	Lone	Tomas Cabili	Nacionalista Democrata Pro-Independencia
Leyte	1st	Carlos Tan	Nacionalista Democratico
Leyte	2nd	Dominador Tan	Nacionalista Democratico
Leyte	3rd	Tomas Oppus	Nacionalista Democratico
Leyte	4th	Francisco Enage (Note: Francisco Enage was appointed as Technical Adviser to President Manuel L. Quezon on September 1, 1936.)	Nacionalista Democratico
Leyte	4th	Norberto Romualdez (Note: Norberto Romualdez was elected on September 1, 1936, to succeed Francisco Enage.)	Nacionalista
Leyte	5th	Ruperto Kapunan	Nacionalista Democratico
Manila	1st	Gregorio Perfecto	Nacionalista Democrata Pro-Independencia
Manila	2nd	Pedro Gil	Nacionalista Democrata Pro-Independencia
Marinduque	Lone	Cecilio A. Maneja (Note: Cecilio A. Maneja was removed by the Electoral Commission on August 31, 1937, after an electoral protest.)	Nacionalista Democratico
Marinduque	Lone	Jose A. Uy (Note: Jose A. Uy replaced Cecilio A. Maneja on August 31, 1937, after winning an electoral protest.)	Nacionalista Democratico
Masbate	Lone	Pio V. Corpus	Nacionalista Democratico
Mindoro	Lone	Juan L. Luna	Nacionalista Democratico
Misamis Occidental	Lone	José Ozámiz	Nacionalista Democratico
Misamis Oriental	Lone	Leon Borromeo	Nacionalista Democratico
Mountain Province	1st	Saturnino Moldero	Nacionalista Democratico
Mountain Province	2nd	Felipe E. Jose	Nacionalista Democratico
Mountain Province	3rd	George K. Tait	Nacionalista Democratico
Negros Occidental	1st	Enrique Magalona	Nacionalista Democratico
Negros Occidental	2nd	Pedro Hernaez	Nacionalista Democratico
Negros Occidental	3rd	Gil Montilla	Nacionalista Democratico
Negros Oriental	1st	Guillermo Z. Villanueva	Nacionalista Democratico
Negros Oriental	2nd	Jose E. Romero	Nacionalista Democratico
Nueva Ecija	1st	Manuel A. Alzate	Nacionalista Democratico
Nueva Ecija	2nd	Felipe Buencamino Jr.	Nacionalista Democratico
Nueva Vizcaya	Lone	Bernardo L. Buenafe (Note: Appointed.)	Nacionalista Democratico
Palawan	Lone	Claudio R. Sandoval	Nacionalista Democratico
Pampanga	1st	Eligio G. Lagman	Nacionalista Democrata Pro-Independencia
Pampanga	2nd	Jose P. Fausto	Nacionalista Democrata Pro-Independencia
Pangasinan	1st	Anacleto B. Ramos	Nacionalista Democratico
Pangasinan	2nd	Eugenio Perez	Nacionalista Democratico
Pangasinan	3rd	Daniel Maramba	Nacionalista Democratico
Pangasinan	4th	Nicomedes T. Rupisan	Nacionalista Democratico
Pangasinan	5th	Narciso Ramos	Nacionalista Democratico
Rizal	1st	Pedro Magsalin	Nacionalista Democratico
Rizal	2nd	Emilio de la Paz	Nacionalista Democratico
Romblon	Lone	Gabriel Fabella	Nacionalista Democratico
Samar	1st	Tiburcio Tancinco	Nacionalista Democratico
Samar	2nd	Serafin S. Marabut (Note: Serafin S. Marabut was appointed as Undersecretary of Finance and Director of the Budget Office on May 27, 1936.)	Nacionalista Democratico
Samar	2nd	Pascual B. Azanza (Note: Pascual B. Azanza was elected on September 1, 1936, to succeed Serafin S. Marabut.)	Nacionalista Democratico
Samar	3rd	Juan L. Bocar	Nacionalista Democratico
Sorsogon	1st	Norberto Roque	Nacionalista Democratico
Sorsogon	2nd	Tomas Clemente	Nacionalista Democratico
Sulu	Lone	Ombra Amilbangsa	Nacionalista Democratico
Surigao	Lone	Ricardo Navarro	Nacionalista Democratico
Tarlac	1st	Jose Cojuangco	Nacionalista Democratico
Tarlac	2nd	Benigno Aquino Sr.	Nacionalista Democrata Pro-Independencia
Tayabas	1st	Jose A. Angara (Note: Jose A. Angara died on November 29, 1937.)	Nacionalista Democratico
Tayabas	2nd	Francisco Lavides	Nacionalista Democratico
Zambales	Lone	Potenciano Lesaca	Nacionalista Democratico
Zamboanga	Lone	Juan S. Alano	Nacionalista Democratico

== Changes in membership ==
District	Incumbent				Special election	Successor		
District	Member	Party	Date	Reason	Special election	Member	Party	Date
Ilocos Norte–2nd	Julio Nalundasan	Nacionalista Democratico	September 20, 1935	Died in office	September 1, 1936	Ulpiano H. Arzadon	Nacionalista Democratico	September 1, 1936
Abra–Lone	Quintin Paredes	Nacionalista Democratico	January 9, 1936	Appointed as Resident Commissioner of the Philippines	September 1, 1936	Agapito Garduque	Nacionalista	September 1, 1936
Samar–2nd	Serafin S. Marabut	Nacionalista Democratico	May 27, 1936	Appointed Undersecretary of Finance and Director of the Budget Office	September 1, 1936	Pascual B. Azanza	Nacionalista Democratico	September 1, 1936
Leyte–4th	Francisco Enage	Nacionalista Democratico	September 1, 1936	Appointed Technical Adviser to President Manuel L. Quezon	September 1, 1936	Norberto Romualdez	Nacionalista	September 1, 1936
Camarines Norte–Lone	Cayetano Lukban	Nacionalista Democratico	September 30, 1936	Removed after an electoral protest	August 3, 1937	Froilan Pimentel	Nacionalista Democratico	August 3, 1937
Batangas–1st	Natalio Lopez	Nacionalista Democrata Pro-Independencia	October 26, 1936	Removed after an electoral protest	—N/a	Miguel Tolentino	Nacionalista Democrata Pro-Independencia	October 26, 1936
Camarines Sur–2nd	Luis N. de Leon	Nacionalista Democratico	May 25, 1937	Removed after an electoral protest	—N/a	Jose Fuentebella	Nacionalista Democrata Pro-Independencia	May 25, 1937
Marinduque–Lone	Cecilio A. Maneja	Nacionalista Democratico	August 31, 1937	Removed after an electoral protest	—N/a	Jose A. Uy	Nacionalista Democratico	August 31, 1937
Tayabas–1st	Jose A. Angara	Nacionalista Democratico	November 29, 1937	Died in office	—N/a			

== See also ==
- National Assembly of the Philippines
- 1935 Philippine general election
