= 1936 Philippine legislative special elections =

1936 Philippine National Assembly special elections
- September 1, 1936

Four of 89 seats in the National Assembly of the Philippines
	First party	Second party
Party	Nacionalista	Nacionalista Democratico
Seats won	2	2
Seat change	▲2	▼2

Four special elections (known elsewhere as "by-elections") to the National Assembly of the Philippines, the legislature of the Commonwealth of the Philippines, were done on September 1, 1936. These were to fill up vacancies from four seats.

== Electoral system ==
The seats in the National Assembly were elected from single member districts, under the first-past-the-post voting system.

The following seats were up for election:

- Abra's at-large district
- Ilocos Norte's 2nd district
- Leyte's 4th district
- Samar's 2nd district

== Special elections ==
=== Abra ===
The seat from Abra was vacated when incumbent Quintín Paredes was appointed Resident Commissioner to the United States, the Commonwealth of the Philippines's delegate in the United States Congress.

1936 Abra's at-large National Assembly district special election
Candidate	Party	Votes	%
Agapito Garduque	Nacionalista	3,320	47.19
Jesus Paredes		2,525	35.89
Adolfo Brillantes		1,190	16.92
Total		7,035	100.00
Majority		795	11.3

=== Ilocos Norte's 2nd district ===
The seat from Ilocos Norte's 2nd district was vacated when assemblyman-elect Julio Nalundasan was shot at his home in Batac just right after the 1935 legislative election. Nalundasan was murdered on September 20, 1935 while he was brushing his teeth. Ferdinand Marcos, the future president and son of Nalundasan's opponent Mariano, among others, was convicted of murder, but that was reversed on appeal years later.

1936 Ilocos Norte's 2nd National Assembly district special election
Candidate	Party	Votes	%
Ulpiano Arzadon	Nacionalista Democratico	7,452	68.90
Mariano Marcos	Nacionalista	2,597	24.01
Juan Root		766	7.08
Total		10,815	100.00
Majority		4,855	44.89

=== Leyte's 4th district ===
The seat from Leyte's 4th district was vacated when incumbent Francisco Enage was appointed to be a member of the technical staff at Malacañang Palace.

1936 Leyte's 4th National Assembly district special election
Candidate	Party	Votes	%
Norberto Romualdez	Nacionalista	7,033	76.32
Antonio Marcos		2,182	23.68
Total		9,215	100.00
Majority		4,851	52.64

=== Samar's 2nd district ===
The seat from Samar's 2nd district was vacated when incumbent Serafin Marabut was appointed to be undersecretary of finance and director of the Budget Office (now the Secretary of Budget and Management).

1936 Samar's 2nd National Assembly district special election
Candidate	Party	Votes	%
Pascual Azanza	Nacionalista Democratico	4,722	59.34
Leocaldo Tanseco		3,236	40.66
Total		7,958	100.00
Majority		1,486	18.67

== See also ==
- 1940 Philippine National Assembly special elections
