= Lacsamana (surname) =

Lacsamana The surname Lacsamana is of Filipino origin, deeply rooted in the history and culture of the Philippines. It is believed to be derived from the Sanskrit word Lakshmana, a prominent figure in the Hindu epic Ramayana. In the epic, Lakshmana is known for his unwavering loyalty, courage, and dedication to his brother Rama.

Over time, as Hinduism and Indian culture influenced Southeast Asia, including the Philippines, the name Lakshmana was adopted and evolved into various forms, including Lacsamana. As a surname, Lacsamana likely originated as a way to honor or signify a connection to these virtuous qualities.

Notable people with the surname include:

- Alma Moreno (born 1959), Filipino actress and politician
- Mark Anthony Lacsamana Fernandez (born 1979), Filipino actor
- Vandolph (born 1984), Filipino actor, comedian and politician
- Winwyn Marquez (born 1992), Filipino actress and beauty pageant titleholder
- Chino Trinidad (1967–2024), Filipino sports journalist and executive
- Rafael Lacsamana Lazatin (1906–1993), Filipino politician and businessman
- Francisco Benito Isabelo Lacsamana Ortega (1904–1967), Filipino lawyer and politician
- Joaquin Lacsamana Ortega (1916–1996), Filipino politician
