= Misamis Occidental's at-large congressional district =

Legislative district of the Philippines

Misamis Occidental's at-large congressional district is an obsolete congressional district of the Philippines that encompassed the entire province of Misamis Occidental. It was created ahead of the 1931 Philippine House of Representatives elections following the 1929 division of Misamis into two provinces. The district elected one member to the final two meetings of the Philippine Assembly from 1931 to 1935 and to the Commonwealth National Assembly from 1935 to 1941.

Two members represented the district in the Second Republic National Assembly from 1943 to 1944. It returned to a single-member constituency for the restored House of Representatives in both the Commonwealth Congress from 1945 to 1946 and all seven meetings post-independence until 1972. The district was last contested at the 1984 Philippine parliamentary election and was abolished following the 1987 reapportionment under a new constitution.

== Representation history ==
#	Term of office		Legislature	Single seat							
#	Start	End	Legislature	Image	Member	Party	Electoral history				
=== Misamis Occidental's at-large district for the House of Representatives of the Philippine Islands ===
District created November 2, 1929. Redistricted from Misamis's 2nd district.
1	June 2, 1931	September 16, 1935	9th		José Ozámiz	Nacionalista; Consolidado	Elected in 1931.				
1	June 2, 1931	September 16, 1935	10th		José Ozámiz	Nacionalista; Democrático	Re-elected in 1934.				
#	Term of office		National Assembly	Single seat							
#	Start	End	National Assembly	Image	Member	Party	Electoral history				
=== Misamis Occidental's at-large district for the National Assembly (Commonwealth of the Philippines) ===
(1)	September 15, 1935	December 30, 1941	1st		José Ozámiz	Nacionalista; Democrático	Re-elected in 1935.				
(1)	September 15, 1935	December 30, 1941	2nd		José Ozámiz	Nacionalista	Re-elected in 1938.				
#	Term of office		National Assembly	Seat A				Seat B			
#	Start	End	National Assembly	Image	Member	Party	Electoral history	Image	Member	Party	Electoral history
=== Misamis Occidental's at-large district for the National Assembly (Second Philippine Republic) ===
District re-created September 7, 1943.
–	September 25, 1943	February 2, 1944	3rd		Rufino Abadiez	KALIBAPI	Elected in 1943.		P.M. Stuart del Rosario	KALIBAPI	Appointed as an ex officio member.
#	Term of office		Common wealth Congress	Single seat				Seats eliminated			
#	Start	End	Common wealth Congress	Image	Member	Party	Electoral history	Seats eliminated			
=== Misamis Occidental's at-large district for the House of Representatives of the Commonwealth of the Philippines ===								Seats eliminated			
District re-created May 24, 1945.								Seats eliminated			
2	June 11, 1945	May 25, 1946	1st		Eugenio Stuart del Rosario	Nacionalista	Elected in 1941.	Seats eliminated			
#	Term of office		Congress	Single seat				Seats eliminated			
#	Start	End	Congress	Image	Member	Party	Electoral history	Seats eliminated			
=== Misamis Occidental's at-large district for the House of Representatives of the Philippines ===								Seats eliminated			
3	May 25, 1946	December 30, 1953	1st		Porfirio G. Villarín	Liberal	Elected in 1946.	Seats eliminated			
3	May 25, 1946	December 30, 1953	2nd		Porfirio G. Villarín	Liberal	Re-elected in 1949.	Seats eliminated			
4	December 30, 1953	March 17, 1962	3rd		William L. Chiongbian	Liberal	Elected in 1953.	Seats eliminated			
4	December 30, 1953	March 17, 1962	4th		William L. Chiongbian	Liberal	Re-elected in 1957.	Seats eliminated			
4	December 30, 1953	March 17, 1962	5th		William L. Chiongbian	Liberal	Re-elected in 1961. Removed from office after an electoral protest.	Seats eliminated			
5	March 17, 1962	December 30, 1965	5th		Guillermo C. Sambo	Nacionalista	Declared winner of 1961 elections.	Seats eliminated			
(4)	December 30, 1965	September 23, 1972	6th		William L. Chiongbian	Liberal	Elected in 1965.	Seats eliminated			
(4)	December 30, 1965	September 23, 1972	7th		William L. Chiongbian	Nacionalista	Re-elected in 1969. Removed from office after imposition of martial law.	Seats eliminated			
District dissolved into the nine-seat Region X's at-large district for the Interim Batasang Pambansa.								Seats eliminated			
#	Term of office		Batasang Pambansa	Single seat				Seats eliminated			
#	Start	End	Batasang Pambansa	Image	Member	Party	Electoral history	Seats eliminated			
=== Misamis Occidental's at-large district for the Regular Batasang Pambansa ===								Seats eliminated			
District re-created February 1, 1984.								Seats eliminated			
6	July 23, 1984	March 25, 1986	2nd		Henry A. Regalado	Independent	Elected in 1984.	Seats eliminated			
District dissolved into Misamis Occidental's 1st and 2nd districts.								Seats eliminated			

== See also ==
- Legislative districts of Misamis Occidental
