= Rufino Abadies =

Filipino politician

Member of the National Assembly of the Philippines for Misamis Occidental's at-large district
- In office September 25, 1943 – February 2, 1944 Serving with P.M. Stuart del Rosario
- Period: Second Republic
- Preceded by: José Ozámiz (in the Commonwealth National Assembly)
- Succeeded by: District abolished (seat later held by Eugenio Stuart del Rosario in 1945)

Personal details
- Born: July 30, 1909
- Died: October 7, 1986 (aged 77)
- Party: KALIBAPI (1943–1945)

Rufino Jaca Abadies (July 30, 1909 – October 7, 1986) was a Filipino politician who served as a member of the National Assembly during the Second Philippine Republic representing Misamis Occidental's at-large assembly district from 1943 to 1944.

== Life and career ==
Rufino Jaca Abadies was born on July 30, 1909, to Ruperto Abadies and Cala Jaca. In 1943, he was elected to the National Assembly of the Second Philippine Republic during the Japanese occupation, representing Misamis Occidental alongside ex-officio assemblyman and provincial governor P. M. Stuart del Rosario. As an assemblyman, he was a member of the committee on forestry.

Abadiez died on October 7, 1986.

House of Representatives of the Philippines
Preceded by José Ozámiz (in the Commonwealth National Assembly)	Member of the National Assembly of the Philippines for Misamis Occidental's at-large district 1943–1944; With: P.M. Stuart del Rosario	Vacant Dissolution of the Second Republic Title next held by Eugenio Stuart del Rosario (in the House of Representatives)
