= Ortega family (Philippines) =

Filipino political family

- Political family
- Shield of the Ortega family
- Country: Philippines
- Current region: La Union
- Founded: 19th century
- Founder: Antonio Ortega
- Members: 2nd generation; Joaquin Sr.; 3rd generation; Francisco; Titing; 4th generation; Victor; Bobby; Mario Eduardo; 5th generation; Paolo; Francisco (Pacoy) III; 6th generation; Raphaelle David
- Connected members: Ysabel Ortega
- Connected families: Lacsamana and Orros families
- Traditions: Politics of La Union

The Ortega family of the province of La Union is an influential political clan in the Philippines.

== Background ==
=== Settlement in La Union ===
The Ortega clan's settlement in La Union occurred in the late 19th century when Antonio Ortega was assigned at the Tabacalera in Carlatan, San Fernando. He married Juana Juaquino of Surigao giving birth to Joaquin Ortega in 1870 in Cebu and is described as a Spanish meztiso. After studying at the University of Santo Tomas, Joaquin Ortega began working at the Tabacalera in Carlatan at 19 years old.

=== Political involvement ===
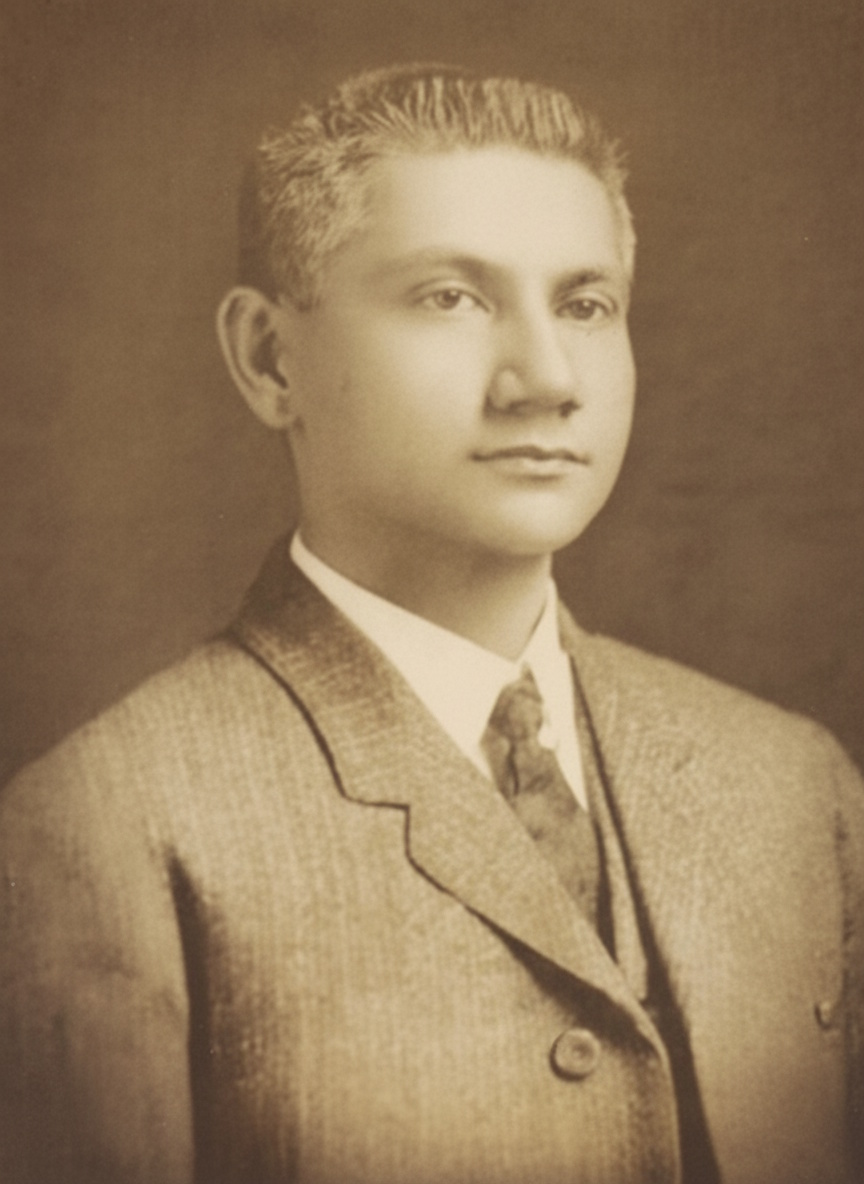
Governor Joaquin Ortega (1901–1904)

The Ortegas are known for being involved in the politics of La Union for roughly a century. Their relevance as a political family is said to have begun in 1901 during the American colonial period in the Philippines when Joaquin Ortega was appointed by the Taft Commission as La Union governor in 1901. He is the first civilian administrator of the province. He declined to take part in the 1904 election and was succeeded by Joaquin Luna. He have 14 children with his wife Francisca Lacsamana from Bangar Two of his sons, Joaquin Jr. (Titing) and Francisco (Pacoy) became politicians.

Members of the family has contested for the same position multiple times. Titing Ortega ran against his nephew, Victor for the office of La Union's 1st congressional district in the 1969 election after the elder Ortega initially announced he was quitting from politics. Victor lost to Joaquin Jr by 3,000 votes. Victor Ortega contested with three cousins for the 1971 Constitutional Convention.

The Ortegas would return to holding the executive seat of La Union when Joaquin Ortega Jr was elected as governor in the 1988 election.

In 1998, Mary Jane Ortega ran against a second cousin for the position of mayor of San Fernando. Originally from Indang, Cavite, Mary Jane is Victor's wife. She is the first female Ortega family member to enter politics.

The Ortegas has never represented the province's 2nd congressional district.
