= Victor Ortega =

Victor Ortega may refer to:

- Víctor Ortega (born 1988), Colombian diver
- Victor Ortega (politician) (born 1934), Filipino politician and lawyer
