= William Chiongbian =

Filipino politician and businessman

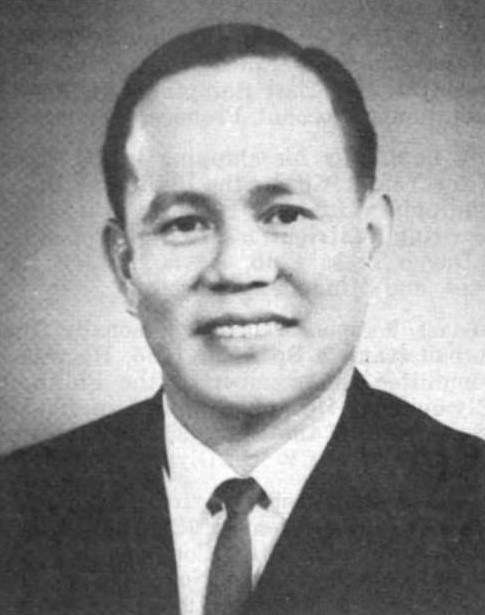
- Chiongbian official portrait during the 6th Congress.

Governor of Misamis Occidental
- In office 1987 – June 30, 1992
- Vice Governor: Florencio Garcia
- Preceded by: Gorgonio Buaquiña
- Succeeded by: Benito Chiongbian

Member of the Philippine National Assembly from Misamis Occidental's Lone District
- In office December 30, 1965 – September 23, 1972
- Preceded by: Guillermo Sambo
- Succeeded by: Post disestablished
- In office December 30, 1953 – March 17, 1962
- Preceded by: Porfirio G. Villarín
- Succeeded by: Guillermo Sambo

Personal details
- Born: William Lee Chiongbian; December 7, 1914 Oroquieta, Misamis, Philippine Islands
- Died: August 17, 2002 (aged 87) Cebu City, Philippines
- Party: Liberal (1953–1962); Nacionalista (1965–1972)
- Spouse: Virginia Sy (m. 1939)
- Education: Silliman University (BS)

William Lee Chiongbian (December 7, 1914 – August 17, 2002) was a Filipino politician and businessman. He represented Misamis Occidental's at-large congressional district in the House of Representatives. He is also the founder of the Cebu-based shipping company, William Lines and a patron of football in the Philippines.

== Early life ==
William Chiongbian was born on December 7, 1914 in Misamis (now Misamis Occidental) to Victoriano Taghap Chiongbian of Jimenez and Rosario Lee (born Lee Chay Hong) who resided in Oroquieta. The elder Chiongbian was a politician who was elected as a councilor of Plaridel in 1925 and became first municipal mayor of Don Mariano Marcos which was later renamed after him in 1986. His brother, James Chiongbian, was a lone district congressman of South Cotabato from 1969 to 1972.

== Political career ==
Chiongbian was first elected as representative of Misamis Occidental's at-large district in the House of Representatives in 1953. He was re-elected four times in 1957, 1961, 1965, 1969 serving until 1972. However Guillermo Sambo successfully filed an electoral protest against Chiongbian for his election in 1961. Sambo, who was ruled the winner of the 1961 elections by the Supreme Court served from 1962 until 1965.

== Business career ==
Chiongbian established the William Lines shipping company on December 13, 1945, making Cebu as its hub. He named a ship M/V Victoriano after his father which had its maiden voyage serving the locales of Cebu to Tagbilaran, Bohol and Siquijor, then to Plaridel and Ozamiz, Misamis Occidental.

From 1946 to 1949, his citizenship was subject to dispute by the Bureau of Customs, which meant that Chiongian could lose his ships since non-Filipino citizens cannot operate and own vessels of Philippine registry at that time. In 1949, the Supreme Court ruled that Chiongbian is a Filipino citizenship explaining that the election of Chiongbian's father into political office had the legal effect of making him a Filipino citizen, which extended to the younger Chiongbian who was a minor at that time.

William Lines' fleet grew to 15 ships and Chiongbian himself was named Shipping Man of the Year by the Business Writers Association of the Philippines. Chiongbian ceded William Lines to his son, Victor in 1966.

== Involvement in football ==
Chongbian was involved in football as a patron. A former football player in college, he formed the William Lines Football Team. The football team initially played matches within Cebu against local collegiate teams, seminarians, and visiting teams and later played outside Cebu such as in Dumaguete, Bacolod and Iloilo which are considered as football strongholds in the country. His team was also among the first Filipino club to employ a foreign coach, when Chiongbian brought in Scottish coach Tom Sneddon, who led Hong Kong to a third-place finish in the 1956 AFC Asian Cup, to coach William Lines

Chongbian served from 1955 to 1957 as football committee chair of the Philippine Amateur Athletic Federation. He also contributed to the Philippines national team providing ₱120,000 for the side's preparation for the 1958 Asian Games. The team was able to hold training in Spain prior to the games. The Philippines finished as quarterfinalist for that edition of the Asian Games, causing a 1–0 upset against Japan in the group stage in the process.

Chongbian also encouraged the formation of other football teams such as the Casino Español, Hap Hing Hardware and United Hardware.

The William Lines team eventually went to Manila to take part in competitions in the capital. However, issues in his shipping business forced Chongbian to disband the team.

== Death ==
Chiongbian died on August 17, 2002, due to a heart attack. He was rushed to the Cebu Doctors Hospital in Cebu City but was declared dead on arrival. He was aged 87.

== Personal life ==
Chiongbian was married to Virginia Sy of the SyCip family and had six children.
