= Prospero Sanidad =

Filipino lawyer and politician (1897-1969)

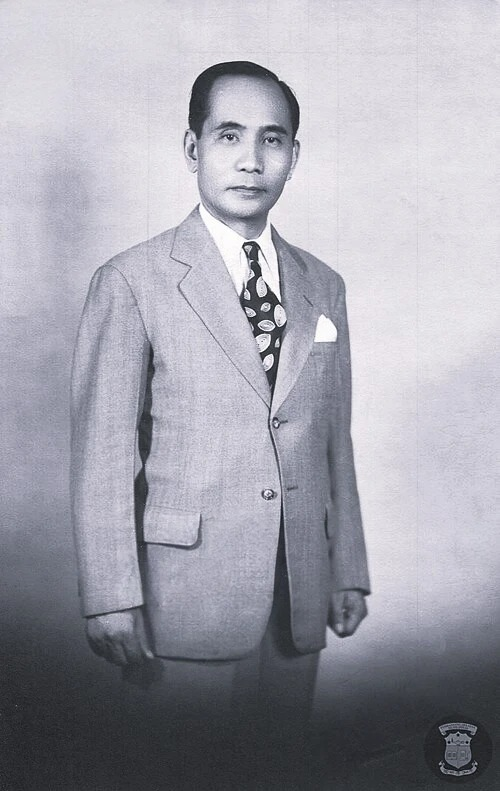
- Sanidad in c. 1947

10th Secretary of Public Works and Communications
- In office June 29, 1949 – 1951
- President: Elpidio Quirino
- Preceded by: Ricardo Nepomuceno
- Succeeded by: Sotero Baluyut

Senator of the Philippines
- In office May 22, 1947 – December 30, 1947

Speaker pro tempore of the House of Representatives of the Philippines
- In office June 9, 1945 – May 25, 1946
- Preceded by: Jose Zulueta (as speaker pro tempore of the National Assembly)
- Succeeded by: Francisco Ortega

Member of Philippine House of Representatives for Ilocos Sur's 2nd district
- In office December 30, 1938 – May 25, 1946
- Preceded by: Sixto Brillantes Sr.
- Succeeded by: Fidel Villanueva
- In office June 5, 1934 – November 15, 1935
- Preceded by: Fidel Villanueva
- Succeeded by: Sixto Brillantes Sr.

Personal details
- Born: January 17, 1897 Narvacan, Ilocos Sur, Captaincy General of the Philippines
- Died: 1969 (aged 71–72) Philippines
- Party: Liberal (1946–1947); Nacionalista (1934–1946)
- Spouse: Rosario Centeno
- Children: 3
- Education: University of the Philippines; George Washington University; National University School of Law

Prospero Casia Sanidad (17 January 1897 – 1969) was a Filipino lawyer and politician. He represented the second district of Ilocos Sur at the House of Representatives of the Philippines from 1934 to 1935, again from 1938 to 1941, and finally from 1945 to 1946. He then served as Senator of the Philippines from May 22, 1947 to December 30, 1947. Lastly, he served as Secretary of Public Works and Communications from 1949 to 1951.

== Early life and education ==
Sanidad was born on 17 January 1897 in Narvacan, Ilocos Sur to Cipriano Sanidad and Cayetana Casia. He pursued his higher education at the University of the Philippines, George Washington University and the National University School of Law in Washington DC, where he graduated with a Bachelor of Laws degree. He was admitted to the Bar in 1928.

== Political career ==
=== House of Representatives ===
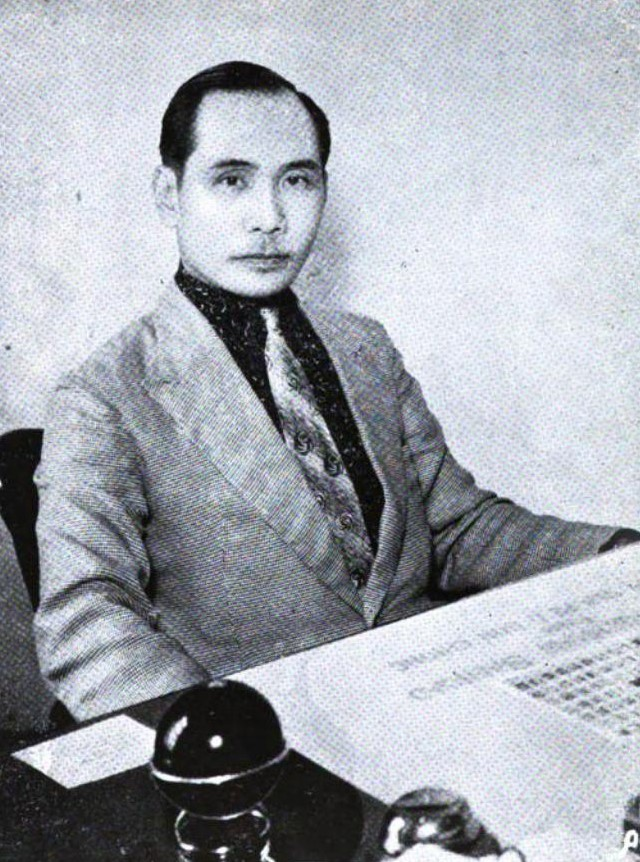
Photograph from The Commercial & Industrial Manual of the Philippines, 1941

Sanidad was elected in 1934 to the House of Representatives as a Nacionalista representative of Ilocos Sur's 2nd district in 1934 and served until 1935. He was elected again to the position in 1938 and reelected in 1941, but was only able to take his second consecutive term in office due to the Japanese occupation during the Second World War.

=== Senate ===
In 1946, he joined the Liberal Party and ran for the Philippine Senate but lost. However, he filed an electoral protest that became highly controversial, as it coincided with other protests filed against members of Congress belonging to the Nacionalista Party and the Democratic Alliance. In 1947, he won his protest and was sworn in, replacing José E. Romero. Beginning in 1946, congressmen who were allies of President Manuel Roxas began a movement to unseat opposition in government. Sanidad, a pro-Roxas legislator, claimed that opposition members in the legislature, especially those elected by the Democratic Alliance, "have no place in the scheme of government".

== Personal life ==
Sanidad was married to Rosario Centeno and had three children.

House of Representatives of the Philippines
Preceded by Jose Zulueta (as speaker pro tempore of the National Assembly)	Speaker pro tempore of the House of Representatives of the Philippines; June 9, 1945 – May 25, 1946	Succeeded by Francisco Ortega
Preceded by Sixto Brillantes Sr.	Representative, Ilocos Sur's 2nd district December 30, 1938 – May 25, 1946 (June 5, 1934 – November 15, 1935)	Succeeded by Fidel Villanueva
Preceded by Fidel Villanueva	Representative, Ilocos Sur's 2nd district December 30, 1938 – May 25, 1946 (June 5, 1934 – November 15, 1935)	Succeeded by Sixto Brillantes Sr.
