= La Union's 1st congressional district =

Legislative district of the Philippines

- Constituency for the House of Representatives of the Philippines
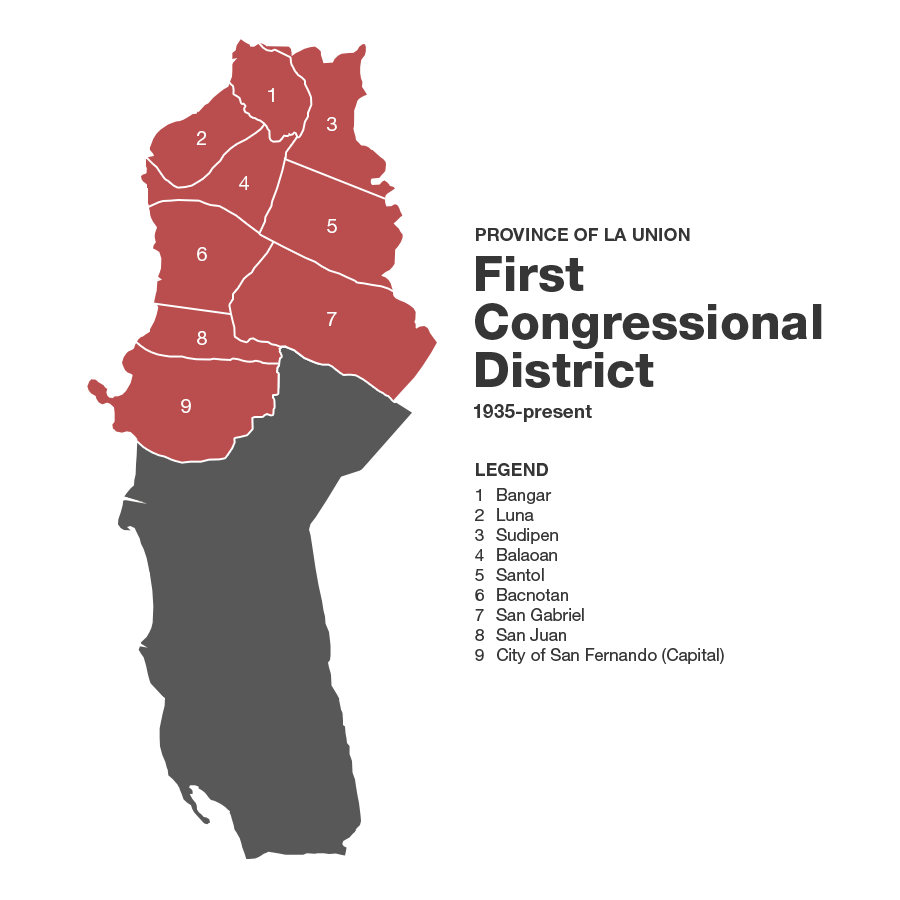
- Boundary of La Union's 1st congressional district in La Union

- Location of La Union within the Philippines
- Province: La Union
- Region: Ilocos Region
- Population: 376,529 (2020)
- Electorate: 243,178 (2022)
- Major settlements: 9 LGUs: Cities; San Fernando; Municipalities; Bacnotan; Balaoan; Bangar; Luna; San Juan; San Gabriel; Santol; Sudipen
- Area: 706.56 km^{2}

Current constituency
- Created: 1907
- Representative: Francisco Paolo Ortega
- Political party: Lakas–CMD
- Congressional bloc: Majority

La Union's 1st congressional district is one of the two congressional districts of the Philippines in the province of La Union. It has been represented in the House of Representatives of the Philippines since 1916 and earlier in the Philippine Assembly from 1907 to 1916. The district consists of the provincial capital city of San Fernando and adjacent municipalities of Bacnotan, Balaoan, Bangar, Luna, San Gabriel, San Juan, Santol and Sudipen. It is currently represented in the 20th Congress by Francisco Paolo Ortega of the Lakas–CMD.

== Representation history ==
#	Image	Member	Term of office		Legislature	Party	Electoral history	Constituent LGUs
#	Image	Member	Start	End	Legislature	Party	Electoral history	Constituent LGUs
=== La Union's 1st district for the Philippine Assembly ===
District created January 9, 1907.
1		Andrés Asprer	October 16, 1907	October 16, 1909	1st	Nacionalista	Elected in 1907.	1907–1916; Bacnotan, Balaoan, Bangar, Luna, San Fernando, San Juan
2		Joaquín Luna	October 16, 1909	October 16, 1916	2nd	Nacionalista	Elected in 1909.	1907–1916; Bacnotan, Balaoan, Bangar, Luna, San Fernando, San Juan
2		Joaquín Luna	October 16, 1909	October 16, 1916	3rd	Nacionalista	Re-elected in 1912.	1907–1916; Bacnotan, Balaoan, Bangar, Luna, San Fernando, San Juan
=== La Union's 1st district for the House of Representatives of the Philippine Islands ===
3		Juan T. Lucero	October 16, 1916	June 6, 1922	4th	Nacionalista	Elected in 1916.	1916–1935; Bacnotan, Balaoan, Bangar, Luna, San Fernando, San Juan
3		Juan T. Lucero	October 16, 1916	June 6, 1922	5th	Nacionalista	Re-elected in 1919.	1916–1935; Bacnotan, Balaoan, Bangar, Luna, San Fernando, San Juan
4		Pío Ancheta	June 6, 1922	June 2, 1925	6th	Nacionalista; Colectivista	Elected in 1922.	1916–1935; Bacnotan, Balaoan, Bangar, Luna, San Fernando, San Juan
5		Fausto Almeida	June 2, 1925	June 5, 1928	7th	Demócrata	Elected in 1925.	1916–1935; Bacnotan, Balaoan, Bangar, Luna, San Fernando, San Juan
(4)		Pío Ancheta	June 5, 1928	June 2, 1931	8th	Nacionalista; Consolidado	Elected in 1928.	1916–1935; Bacnotan, Balaoan, Bangar, Luna, San Fernando, San Juan
6		Mariano Alisangco	June 2, 1931	June 5, 1934	9th	Independent	Elected in 1931.	1916–1935; Bacnotan, Balaoan, Bangar, Luna, San Fernando, San Juan
7		Francisco Ortega	June 5, 1934	September 16, 1935	10th	Nacionalista; Democrático	Elected in 1934.	1916–1935; Bacnotan, Balaoan, Bangar, Luna, San Fernando, San Juan
#	Image	Member	Term of office		National Assembly	Party	Electoral history	Constituent LGUs
#	Image	Member	Start	End	National Assembly	Party	Electoral history	Constituent LGUs
=== La Union's 1st district for the National Assembly (Commonwealth of the Philippines) ===
8		Camilo Osías	September 16, 1935	December 30, 1938	1st	Nacionalista; Demócrata Pro-Independencia	Elected in 1935.	1935–1941; Bacnotan, Balaoan, Bangar, Luna, San Fernando, San Gabriel, San Juan, Santol, Sudipen
9		Delfín B. Flores	December 30, 1938	December 30, 1941	2nd	Nacionalista	Elected in 1938.	1935–1941; Bacnotan, Balaoan, Bangar, Luna, San Fernando, San Gabriel, San Juan, Santol, Sudipen
District dissolved into the two-seat La Union's at-large district for the National Assembly (Second Philippine Republic).
#	Image	Member	Term of office		Common wealth Congress	Party	Electoral history	Constituent LGUs
#	Image	Member	Start	End	Common wealth Congress	Party	Electoral history	Constituent LGUs
=== La Union's 1st district for the House of Representatives of the Commonwealth of the Philippines ===
District re-created May 24, 1945.
(7)		Francisco Ortega	June 11, 1945	May 25, 1946	1st	Nacionalista	Elected in 1941.	1945–1946; Bacnotan, Balaoan, Bangar, Luna, San Fernando, San Gabriel, San Juan, Santol, Sudipen
#	Image	Member	Term of office		Congress	Party	Electoral history	Constituent LGUs
#	Image	Member	Start	End	Congress	Party	Electoral history	Constituent LGUs
=== La Union's 1st district for the House of Representatives of the Philippines ===
(7)		Francisco Ortega	May 25, 1946	December 30, 1949	1st	Liberal	Re-elected in 1946.	1946–1972; Bacnotan, Balaoan, Bangar, Luna, San Fernando, San Gabriel, San Juan, Santol, Sudipen
10		Miguel G. Rilloraza Jr.	December 30, 1949	December 30, 1953	2nd	Nacionalista	Elected in 1949.	1946–1972; Bacnotan, Balaoan, Bangar, Luna, San Fernando, San Gabriel, San Juan, Santol, Sudipen
(7)		Francisco Ortega	December 30, 1953	December 30, 1965	3rd	Nacionalista	Elected in 1953.	1946–1972; Bacnotan, Balaoan, Bangar, Luna, San Fernando, San Gabriel, San Juan, Santol, Sudipen
(7)		Francisco Ortega	December 30, 1953	December 30, 1965	4th	Nacionalista	Re-elected in 1957.	1946–1972; Bacnotan, Balaoan, Bangar, Luna, San Fernando, San Gabriel, San Juan, Santol, Sudipen
(7)		Francisco Ortega	December 30, 1953	December 30, 1965	5th	Nacionalista	Re-elected in 1961.	1946–1972; Bacnotan, Balaoan, Bangar, Luna, San Fernando, San Gabriel, San Juan, Santol, Sudipen
11		Magnolia Antonino	December 30, 1965	November 14, 1967	6th	Independent	Elected in 1965. Resigned on election as senator.	1946–1972; Bacnotan, Balaoan, Bangar, Luna, San Fernando, San Gabriel, San Juan, Santol, Sudipen
12		Joaquín L. Ortega	December 30, 1969	September 23, 1972	7th	Nacionalista	Elected in 1969. Removed from office after imposition of martial law.	1946–1972; Bacnotan, Balaoan, Bangar, Luna, San Fernando, San Gabriel, San Juan, Santol, Sudipen
District dissolved into the twelve-seat Region I's at-large district for the Interim Batasang Pambansa, followed by the two-seat La Union's at-large district for the Regular Batasang Pambansa.
District re-created February 2, 1987.
13		Victor Francisco C. Ortega	June 30, 1987	June 30, 1998	8th	Nacionalista	Elected in 1987.	1987–present Bacnotan, Balaoan, Bangar, Luna, San Fernando, San Gabriel, San Juan, Santol, Sudipen
13		Victor Francisco C. Ortega	June 30, 1987	June 30, 1998	9th	NPC	Re-elected in 1992.	1987–present Bacnotan, Balaoan, Bangar, Luna, San Fernando, San Gabriel, San Juan, Santol, Sudipen
13		Victor Francisco C. Ortega	June 30, 1987	June 30, 1998	10th	Lakas	Re-elected in 1995.	1987–present Bacnotan, Balaoan, Bangar, Luna, San Fernando, San Gabriel, San Juan, Santol, Sudipen
14		Manuel C. Ortega	June 30, 1998	June 30, 2007	11th	NPC	Elected in 1998.	1987–present Bacnotan, Balaoan, Bangar, Luna, San Fernando, San Gabriel, San Juan, Santol, Sudipen
14		Manuel C. Ortega	June 30, 1998	June 30, 2007	12th	NPC	Re-elected in 2001.	1987–present Bacnotan, Balaoan, Bangar, Luna, San Fernando, San Gabriel, San Juan, Santol, Sudipen
14		Manuel C. Ortega	June 30, 1998	June 30, 2007	13th	NPC	Re-elected in 2004.	1987–present Bacnotan, Balaoan, Bangar, Luna, San Fernando, San Gabriel, San Juan, Santol, Sudipen
(13)		Victor Francisco C. Ortega	June 30, 2007	June 30, 2016	14th	Lakas	Elected in 2007.	1987–present Bacnotan, Balaoan, Bangar, Luna, San Fernando, San Gabriel, San Juan, Santol, Sudipen
(13)		Victor Francisco C. Ortega	June 30, 2007	June 30, 2016	15th	Lakas	Re-elected in 2010.	1987–present Bacnotan, Balaoan, Bangar, Luna, San Fernando, San Gabriel, San Juan, Santol, Sudipen
(13)		Victor Francisco C. Ortega	June 30, 2007	June 30, 2016	16th	Lakas	Re-elected in 2013.	1987–present Bacnotan, Balaoan, Bangar, Luna, San Fernando, San Gabriel, San Juan, Santol, Sudipen
15		Pablo C. Ortega	June 30, 2016	June 30, 2022	17th	NPC	Elected in 2016.	1987–present Bacnotan, Balaoan, Bangar, Luna, San Fernando, San Gabriel, San Juan, Santol, Sudipen
15		Pablo C. Ortega	June 30, 2016	June 30, 2022	18th	NPC	Re-elected in 2019.	1987–present Bacnotan, Balaoan, Bangar, Luna, San Fernando, San Gabriel, San Juan, Santol, Sudipen
16		Francisco Paolo P. Ortega V	June 30, 2022	Incumbent	19th	NPC	Elected in 2022.	1987–present Bacnotan, Balaoan, Bangar, Luna, San Fernando, San Gabriel, San Juan, Santol, Sudipen
16		Francisco Paolo P. Ortega V	June 30, 2022	Incumbent	19th	Lakas	Elected in 2022.	1987–present Bacnotan, Balaoan, Bangar, Luna, San Fernando, San Gabriel, San Juan, Santol, Sudipen
16		Francisco Paolo P. Ortega V	June 30, 2022	Incumbent	20th	Lakas	Re-elected in 2025.	1987–present Bacnotan, Balaoan, Bangar, Luna, San Fernando, San Gabriel, San Juan, Santol, Sudipen

== Election results ==
=== 2025 ===
Candidate	Party	Votes	%
Paolo Ortega (incumbent)	Lakas–CMD	143,823	73.45
Joy Ortega	Nacionalista Party	48,420	24.73
Ed Banzon	Partido Demokratiko Pilipino	3,578	1.83
Total		195,821	100.00
Valid votes		195,821	90.08
Invalid/blank votes		21,572	9.92
Total votes		217,393	100.00
Registered voters/turnout		245,584	88.52
Lakas–CMD hold			
Source: Commission on Elections

=== 2022 ===
2022 Philippine House of Representatives elections
Party	Candidate	Votes	%
NPC	Francisco Paolo Ortega	144,295	
WPP	Miguel "Migz" Magsaysay	36,330	
Independent	Mario Rodriguez	7,247	
Total votes			
NPC hold			

=== 2019 ===
2019 Philippine House of Representatives elections
Party	Candidate	Votes	%
NPC	Pablo Ortega	145,723	100
Total votes		145,723	100
NPC hold			

=== 2016 ===
2016 Philippine House of Representatives elections
Party	Candidate	Votes	%
Liberal	Pablo Ortega	117,845	
Independent	Manuel Victor Ortega, Jr.	26,633	
Independent	Justo Oros III	12,017	
Margin of victory			
Invalid or blank votes		25,345	
Total votes		181,840	
Liberal gain from Lakas			

=== 2013 ===
2013 Philippine House of Representatives elections
Party	Candidate	Votes	%
Lakas	Victor Francisco Ortega	117,053	87.49
Independent	Ruella Tiongson	3,380	2.53
Margin of victory		113,673	84.97%
Invalid or blank votes		13,351	9.99
Total votes		133,784	100.00
Lakas hold			

=== 2010 ===
2010 Philippine House of Representatives elections
Party	Candidate	Votes	%
Lakas–Kampi	Victor Francisco Ortega	144,537	100.00
Valid ballots		144,537	87.71
Invalid or blank votes		2,575	2.64
Total votes		164,785	100.00
Lakas–Kampi hold			

== See also ==
- Legislative districts of La Union
