= Joaquin Ortega =

Filipino politician (1868–1943)

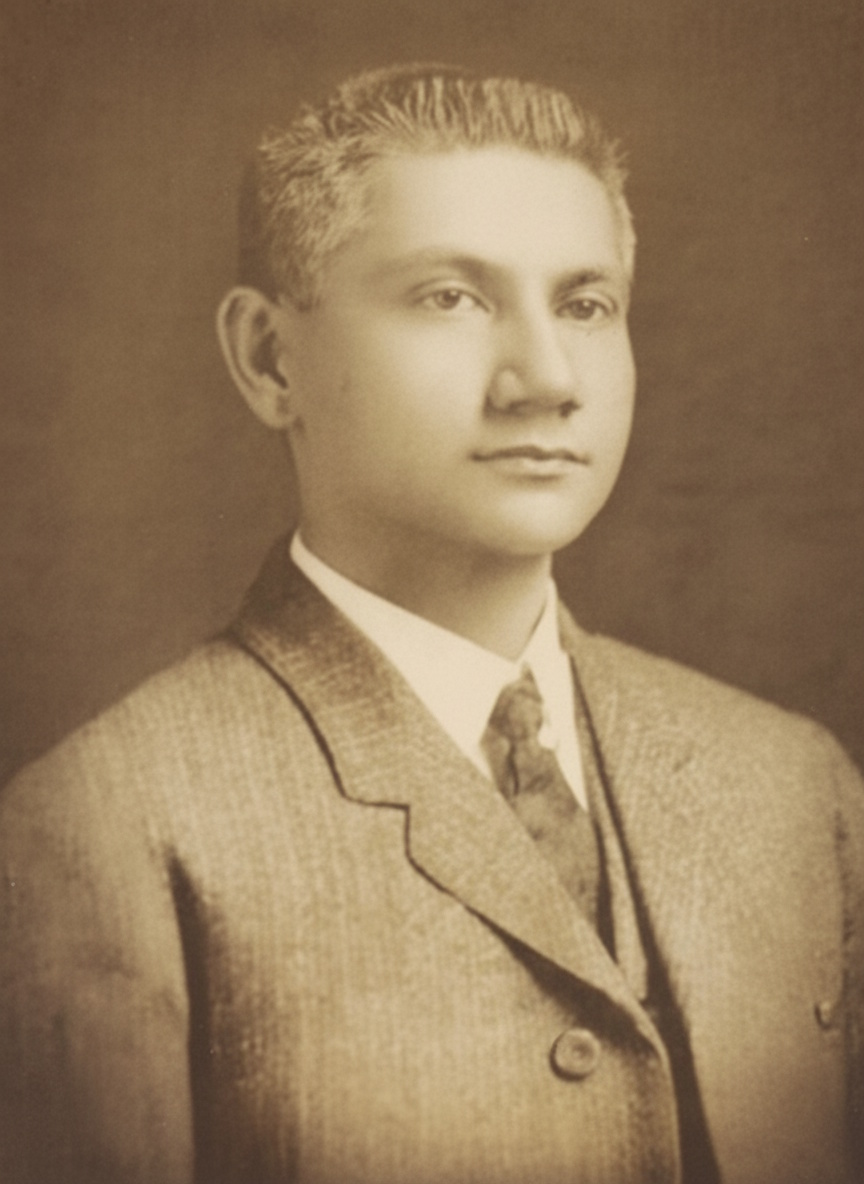

2nd Governor of La Union
- In office August 15, 1901 – February 1904
- Appointed by: Taft Commission (1901–1902)
- Preceded by: Lucino Almeida
- Succeeded by: Joaquin Luna

2nd Governor of Abra
- In office 1904–1914
- Preceded by: Juan Villamor
- Succeeded by: Rosalio Eduarte

Personal details
- Born: Joaquín Vicente Eulogio Ortega y Joaquino; 1868 Cebu, Cebu, Captaincy General of the Philippines
- Died: May 31, 1943 (aged 74–75)
- Party: Federalista
- Spouse: Francisca Lacsamana
- Children: 14 (inc. Joaquin Jr.)
- Relatives: Ortega family
- Occupation: Politician

Joaquín Vicente Eulogio Ortega y Joaquino (1868 – May 31, 1943) was a Filipino politician who was the first civil governor of the province of La Union. His tenure marked the centuries long presence of the Ortega political family in the affairs of the province.

== Early life and education ==
Joaquin Ortega was born in Cebu in 1868. His father was Antonio Ortega who worked at the Tabacalera in Carlatan, San Fernando, La Union while his mother is Juana Juaquino of Surigao. He is described as a Spanish mestizo. He studied at the University of Santo Tomas

He initially worked as a cashier for the Compañia General de Tabacos de Filipinas in La Union.

== Political career ==
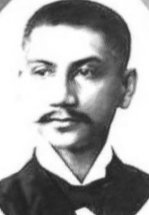
Portrait as governor of La Union, published c. 1905, by the United States Bureau of the Census

He later represented La Union in the Malolos Congress during the Philippine Revolution.

The Taft Commission of the United States-backed Insular Government of the Philippine Islands appointed Ortega as the first civil governor of the Province of La Union on August 15, 1901 and first ever civil governor of the Ilocos Region itself. He was affiliated with Partido Federal. In the 1902 local election, he became the first elected La Union governor serving until February 1904. Ortega went on to become the 2nd Governor of Abra serving for 10 years from 1904 until 1914.

== Death and legacy ==
Ortega died on May 31, 1943. Many of his children and his descendants became politicians themselves. The Ortega political family is often cited as a "dynasty" that endured for a century in La Union's politics. with relatives even contending for the same major position in elections. In 1988, his son Titing was elected as La Union governor.

== Personal life ==
Ortega married Francisca Lacsamana of Bangar with whom he raised fourteen children.
