= Victor Ortega (politician) =

Filipino lawyer and politician (born 1934)

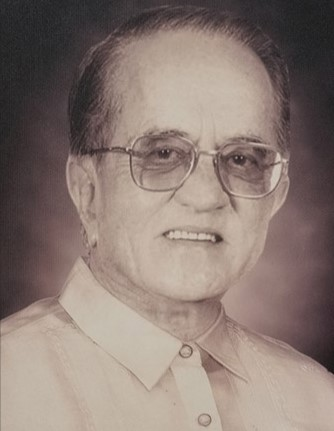

Member of the House of Representatives from La Union's 1st district
- In office June 30, 2007 – June 30, 2016
- Preceded by: Manuel Ortega
- Succeeded by: Pablo Ortega
- In office June 30, 1987 – June 30, 1998
- Preceded by: District re-established Post last held by Titing Ortega
- Succeeded by: Manuel Ortega

25th Governor of La Union
- In office June 30, 2001 – June 30, 2007
- Vice Governor: Aureo Nisce
- Preceded by: Justo Orros Jr.
- Succeeded by: Manuel Ortega

4th Vice Governor of La Union
- In office January 30, 1980 – February 25, 1986
- Governor: Thomas Asprer
- Preceded by: Roman Vilalon Jr.
- Succeeded by: Norman Zandueta

Personal details
- Born: Victor Francisco Campos Ortega; June 4, 1934 (age 92) San Fernando, La Union, Philippine Islands
- Party: Lakas (1995–present)
- Other political affiliations: NPC (1992–1995); Nacionalista (1987–1992); KBL (1980–1986); Liberal (1969)
- Spouse: Mary Jane Ortega
- Relations: Ortega family
- Relatives: Bobby Ortega (brother); Mario Eduardo Ortega (brother)

Victor Francisco Campos Ortega (born June 4, 1934) is a Filipino lawyer and politician who served as representative of the 1st district of La Union from 2007 to 2016, a position he previously held from 1987 to 1998. He served as governor of La Union from 2001 to 2007. He also served as vice governor of La Union from 1980 to 1986.

== Early years ==
Victor Francisco Ortega comes from the Ortega political family of La Union and is a descendant of the first civilian governor of the province Joaquin Ortega Sr. (1901–1904). He was born to Francisco Ortega and Bauang-native Corazon Campos on June 4, 1934 in San Fernando. Victor Ortega is the eldest among eight brothers. He also has a sister.

== Political career ==
Victor Ortega ran for the office of La Union's 1st congressional district in the 1969 election after his uncle Titing Ortega initially announced he was quitting from politics. However, the elder Ortega won by 3,000 votes.

Victor Ortega later contested with three cousins for the 1971 Constitutional Convention.

Victor Ortega was elected as vice governor of La Union unopposed in the 1980 election. He served until 1986.

Ortega became La Union 1st district representative for three terms.

He later became governor of the province from 2001 to 2007.

Ortega filed a candidacy for the position of San Fernando mayor for the 2016 election but later withdrew his candidacy to give way to his wife, Mary Jane who has previously been the executive of the city.

== Personal life ==
Victor Ortega is married to Mary Jane, a woman who hails from Indang, Cavite. Mary Jane Ortega is the first female member of the Ortega clan to enter politics having been elected as San Fernando mayor in 1998. He is a lawyer by profession and ran Ortega Law Offices.

As part of an established political family, six of his brothers have ran for local positions in La Union. Victor Ortega's son-in-law Eduardo Regala has also ran for councilor of San Fernando.
