= Felipe Buencamino Jr. =

Filipino lawyer and politician (1886–1959)

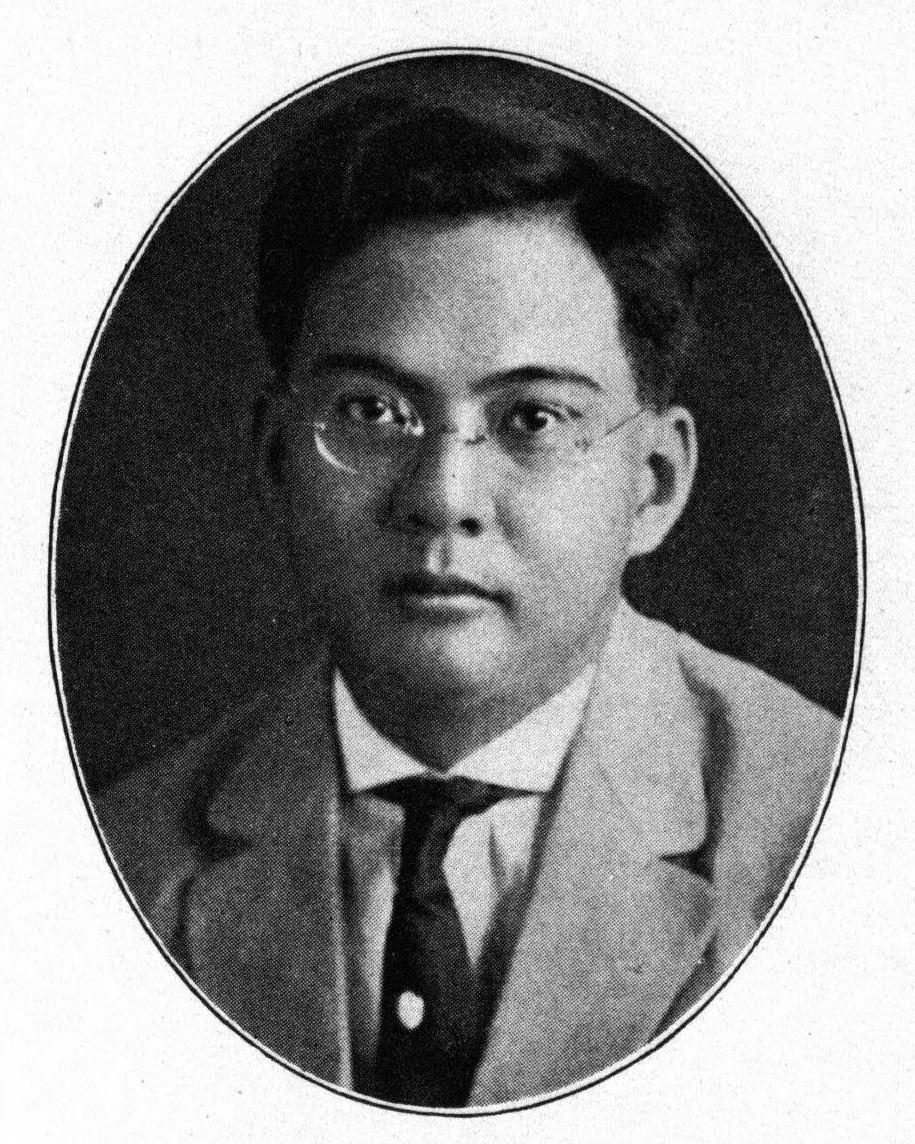
- Portrait of Buencamino as Senate secretary

Member of Philippine National Assembly for Nueva Ecija's 2nd district
- In office November 15, 1935 – March 27, 1940
- Preceded by: Isauro Gabaldón (for the House of Representatives)
- Succeeded by: Gabriel Belmonte

Member of Philippine House of Representatives for Nueva Ecija's 2nd district
- In office June 2, 1931 – June 5, 1934
- Preceded by: Aurelio Cecilio
- Succeeded by: Isauro Gabaldón

Secretary of the Senate of the Philippines
- In office October 16, 1916 – 1917
- Preceded by: Position established
- Succeeded by: Fernando María Guerrero

Personal details
- Born: Felipe Abreu Buencamino Jr. December 12, 1886 Tondo, Manila, Captaincy General of the Philippines
- Died: July 12, 1959 (aged 72)
- Party: Nacionalista (1931–1959)
- Relations: Felipe Buencamino (father)

Military service
- Allegiance: Philippines
- Branch/service: Philippine National Guard
- Rank: Major

Felipe Abreu Buencamino Jr. (December 12, 1886 – July 12, 1959) was a Filipino lawyer and politician who served as the representative for the Nueva Ecija's 2nd congressional district in the National Assembly of the Philippines from 1935 to 1940, and previously in the House of Representatives from 1931 to 1934. A member of the Nacionalista Party, he also served as the first secretary of the Senate of the Philippines from 1916 to 1917.

== Early life and education ==
Felipe Abreu Buencamino Jr. was born on December 12, 1886, in Tondo, Manila, to former foreign relations secretary Felipe Buencamino Sr. and Guadalupe Abreu. He attended various institutions for his education, including Ateneo de Manila University, Liceo de Manila, Boone's University School, and the University of California. He graduated with a Bachelor of Laws degree and was admitted to the Philippine Bar in 1909 and to the United States Supreme Court in 1914. Buencamino practiced as a corporation lawyer in Manila.

== Career ==
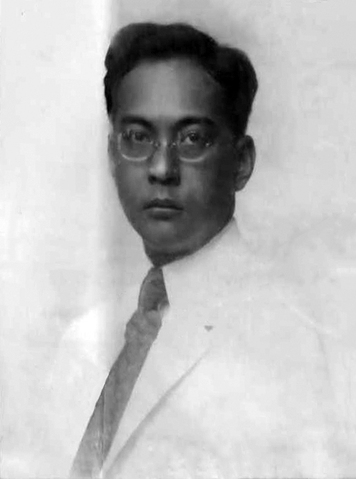
Buencamino on his United States passport application in 1918

Buencamino was elected as the first secretary of the Philippine Senate upon its establishment in 1916, serving until 1917. He later became a member of the Philippine National Guard with the rank of major.

He made two unsuccessful bids for senator in 1922 and 1925, running for the third senatorial district in both elections.

In 1931, he successfully ran for the seat representing Nueva Ecija's 2nd congressional district in the House of Representatives. He was elected to the same district in the National Assembly in 1935 and again in 1938.

In 1939, Buencamino was arrested for his involvement in a fraud scheme involving bonds from the Philippine Railway Company. He effectively resigned his seat on March 27, 1940, after a New York court ordered his 18-month detention and his plea to postpone the execution of the sentence was denied. He was succeeded by Gabriel Belmonte in a special election.

== Personal life ==
Buencamino was married to Maria Romero. He died on July 12, 1959, aged 72.

Senate of the Philippines
First	Secretary; October 16, 1916 – 1917	Succeeded by Fernando María Guerrero
House of Representatives of the Philippines
Preceded by Isauro Gabaldón (for the House of Representatives)	Member of the National Assembly for Nueva Ecija's 2nd district November 15, 1935 – March 27, 1940	Succeeded by Gabriel Belmonte
Preceded by Aurelio Cecilio	Member of the Philippine House of Representatives for Nueva Ecija's 2nd district June 2, 1931 – June 5, 1934	Succeeded by Isauro Gabaldón
