= Bobby Ortega =

Retired police officer and politician (1939–2017)

Member of the Baguio City Council
- In office June 30, 1995 – June 30, 2001
- In office June 30, 2013 – June 30, 2017

Personal details
- Born: Roberto Campos Ortega; March 14, 1939 San Fernando, La Union, Commonwealth of the Philippines
- Died: July 30, 2017 (aged 78) San Fernando, La Union, Philippines
- Party: UNA (2012–2017)
- Other party: NPC (1995–2001)
- Relations: Ortega family
- Relatives: Victor Ortega (brother); Mario Eduardo Ortega (brother); Ysabel Ortega (granddaughter)
- Nickname: Bungo
- Police career
- Service: Philippine National Police
- Allegiance: Philippines
- Divisions: Baguio City Police; MetroCom; MISG
- Rank: Police Colonel

Ret. Col. Roberto "Bobby" Campos Ortega (born March 14, 1939 – July 30, 2017) was a Filipino retired police officer and politician.

== Police career ==
Earned nickname Bungo, Ortega was the former Baguio Police Office chief from 1985 to 1987, and known for lowering the crime rate in the city. Before that was served in the Metrocom Intelligence and Security Group.

== Political career ==
Ortega served as city councilor of Baguio from 1995 to 2001, and to 2013 to 2017. He did not finished his term of office as councilor due to death.

== Personal life ==
Ortega is a member of known Ortega political clan of La Union.

Ortega's life was in the movies “Markang Bungo: The Bobby Ortega Story” in 1991 and “Iligpit si Bobby Ortega: Markang Bungo 2” in 1995, both starring by late action star, Rudy Fernandez.

Ortega died on July 30, 2017 at the Lorma Medical Center, and interred on August 5, 2017.
