= 1938 Philippine legislative election =

- November 8, 1938

All 98 seats in the National Assembly of the Philippines 50 seats needed for a majority
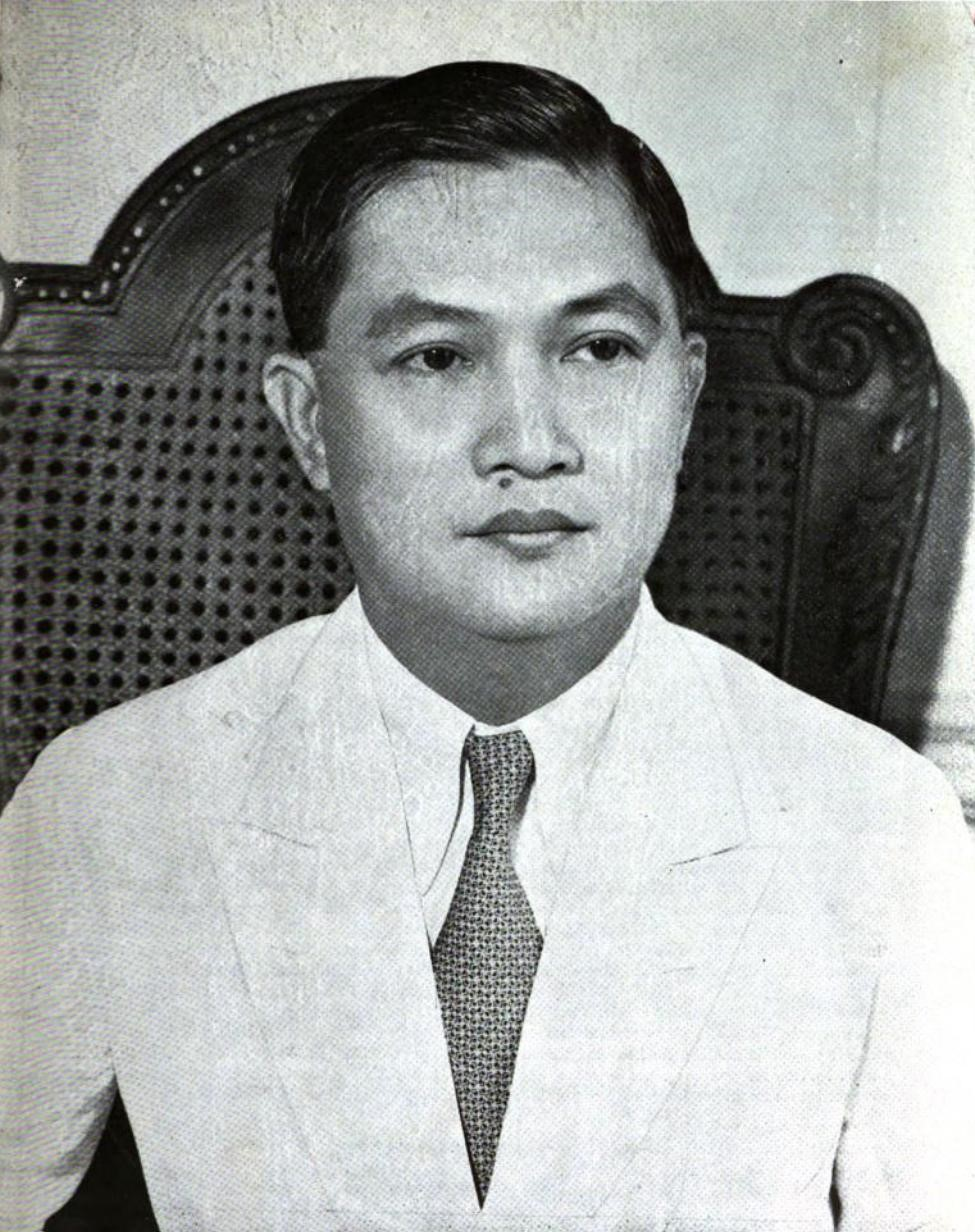
	Majority party
Leader	José Yulo
Party	Nacionalista
Leader's seat	Negros Occidental–3rd
Seats won	98
Seat change	▲15
Speaker before election
Gil Montilla
Nacionalista
Democratico
Elected Speaker
José Yulo
Nacionalista

Elections for the Second National Assembly were held on November 8, 1938, under a new law that allowed block voting, which favored the governing Nacionalista Party (formerly divided into the Democratica and the Pro-Independencia factions, which later reconciled). As expected all, the 98 seats of the National Assembly went to the Nacionalistas. The elected members would serve in the 2nd National Assembly of the Philippines from 1938 to 1941. José Yulo, who was Quezon' Secretary of Justice from 1934 to 1938, was elected Speaker.

== Summary ==
Ahead of the first midterm polls in the country, the two factions of the Nacionalista Party had already reunited. The party went into the 1938 Elections with the confidence of having practically every branch of government under the control of its stalwarts. This reconsolidation of political forces left the opposition in tatters, with the Allied Minorities, a loose caucus of opposition parties, failing to stop the Nacionalista bid.

The elections of 1938 proved to be historic in two ways: It was the first and last time that a single party would secure 100 percent of the seats in the legislature, with the Nacionalistas winning all 98 seats; and it ushered in the years of one-party rule in the country.

== Results ==
↓

98
Nacionalista

Party	Seats	+/–
Nacionalista Party	98	New
Allied Minorities	0	0
Independent	0	−6
Total	98	0

== Contributions ==
The Second National Assembly embarked on passing legislations strengthening the economy, the cloud of the Second World War loomed over the horizon. Certain laws passed by the First National Assembly were modified or repealed to meet existing realities. A controversial immigration law that set an annual limit of 50 immigrants per country which affected mostly Chinese and Japanese nationals escaping the Sino-Japanese War was passed in 1940. Since the law bordered on foreign relations it required the approval of the U.S. president which was nevertheless obtained. When the result of the 1939 census was published, the National Assembly updated the apportionment of legislative districts, which became the basis for the 1941 elections.

== See also ==
- 2nd National Assembly of the Philippines
