= Francisco Ortega (politician) =

Filipino lawyer and politician (1904–1967)

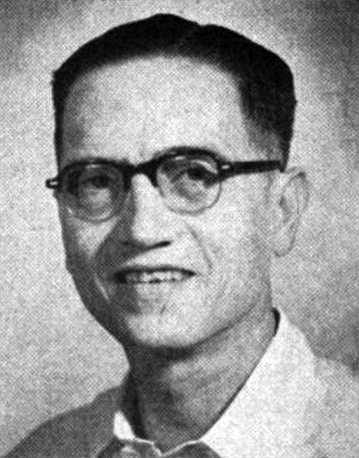
- Ortega's official portrait during the 3rd Congress

Speaker pro tempore of the House of Representatives of the Philippines
- In office May 25, 1946 – December 30, 1949
- Preceded by: Prospero Sanidad
- Succeeded by: Domingo Veloso

Member of the Philippine House of Representatives from La Union's 1st district
- In office December 30, 1953 – December 30, 1965
- Preceded by: Miguel Rilloraza Jr.
- Succeeded by: Magnolia Antonino
- In office June 9, 1945 – December 30, 1949
- Preceded by: Delfín Flores
- Succeeded by: Miguel Rilloraza Jr.
- In office June 5, 1934 – November 15, 1935
- Preceded by: Mariano Alisangco
- Succeeded by: Camilo Osías

Mayor of Baguio
- In office April 3, 1951 – January 12, 1952
- Preceded by: Gil Mallare
- Succeeded by: Virginia Oteyza-de Guia

Member of the San Fernando Municipal Council
- In office 1928–1934

Personal details
- Born: Francisco Benito Isabelo Lacsamana Ortega; July 8, 1904 San Fernando, La Union, Philippine Islands
- Died: March 20, 1967 (aged 62)
- Party: Nacionalista (1934–1946; 1953–1967)
- Other political affiliations: Liberal (1946–1953)
- Spouse: Corazon Campos
- Relations: Ortega family
- Children: 9, including Victor, Mario and Bobby
- Relatives: Titing Ortega (brother)
- Profession: Lawyer

Francisco Benito Isabelo "Pacoy" Lacsamana Ortega (July 8, 1904 – March 20, 1967) was a Filipino lawyer and politician who served as speaker pro tempore of the House of Representatives of the Philippines from 1946 to 1949. He represented La Union's 1st district in the House of Representatives from 1934 to 1935, 1945 to 1949, and 1953 to 1965.

== Early life and education ==
Ortega was born on July 8, 1904, in San Fernando, La Union, to former governor Joaquin Ortega Jr. and Francisca Lacsamana. He graduated with a Bachelor of Laws degree and passed the 1925 Bar examination. He began practicing law and pursued postgraduate studies at Georgetown University in Washington, D.C.

== Political career ==
Ortega began his political career with his election to the San Fernando Municipal Council in 1928. In 1934, he was first elected to the House of Representatives, representing La Union's 1st district. He won a second term in 1941 but only assumed office in 1945 following World War II. In 1946, he ran under the Liberal Party banner and won, and was elected House speaker pro tempore. In 1951, Ortega was appointed as mayor of Baguio until 1952. Ortega returned to the House in 1953 after switching back to the Nacionalista Party, and served for three consecutive terms until 1965. His seat was later held by his father in 1969.

== Personal life ==
Ortega was married to Corazon Campos, with whom he had nine children, including Victor, Manuel and Pablo, who held his congressional seat for various terms beginning in 1987. His son Mario, is the current governor of La Union since 2025.

== Death ==
Ortega died on March 20, 1967.

== Legacy ==
The Speaker Pro Tempore Francisco I. Ortega Legislative Building at the La Union Provincial Capitol and the Speaker Pro-Tempore Francisco I. Ortega Convention Center, both in San Fernando City, were named in his honor.

House of Representatives of the Philippines
Preceded by Prospero Sanidad	Speaker pro tempore of the House of Representatives of the Philippines; May 25, 1946 – December 30, 1949	Succeeded by Domingo Veloso
Preceded by Miguel Rilloraza Jr.	Member of the Philippine House of Representatives for La Union's 1st district December 30, 1953 – December 30, 1965 (June 9, 1945 – December 30, 1949) (June 5, 1934 – November 15, 1935)	Succeeded by Magnolia Antonino
Preceded by Delfin Flores	Member of the Philippine House of Representatives for La Union's 1st district December 30, 1953 – December 30, 1965 (June 9, 1945 – December 30, 1949) (June 5, 1934 – November 15, 1935)	Succeeded by Miguel Rilloraza Jr.
Preceded by Mariano Alisangco	Member of the Philippine House of Representatives for La Union's 1st district December 30, 1953 – December 30, 1965 (June 9, 1945 – December 30, 1949) (June 5, 1934 – November 15, 1935)	Succeeded by Camilo Osías
Political offices
Preceded by Gil Mallare	Mayor of Baguio; April 3, 1951 – January 12, 1952	Succeeded by Virginia Oteyza-de Guia
