= 1940 Philippine legislative special elections =

1940 Philippine National Assembly special elections
- December 10, 1940

Four of 98 seats in the National Assembly of the Philippines
	First party
Party	Nacionalista
Seats won	4
Seat change	Steady

Four special elections (known elsewhere as "by-elections") were held on December 10, 1940, for vacant seats in the National Assembly of the Philippines, the legislative body of the Commonwealth of the Philippines. These elections were conducted to fill the seats left vacant by the appointment of Pedro Sabido as manager of the National Abaca and other Fibers Corporation in Albay's third district, the deaths of Ruperto Montinola in Iloilo's second district and Ruperto Kapunan in Leyte's fifth district, and the resignation of Felipe Buencamino Jr. in Nueva Ecija's second district following his arrest over a fraud scheme. The date of the special elections was set by President Manuel L. Quezon through Proclamation No. 625 signed on October 4, 1940.

The special elections were held on the same date as local elections for provincial, municipal and city officials.

== Results ==
Party	Seats
Nacionalista Party	4
Young Philippines	0
Popular Philippines	0
Popular Front (Juan Sumulong wing)	0
Popular Front (Pedro Abad Santos wing)	0
Total	4

The following were elected to fill the four vacant seats in the National Assembly of the Philippines, all retaining the control of the Nacionalista Party:

- Albay—3rd: Marcial O. Rañola
- Iloilo—2nd: Oscar Ledesma
- Leyte—5th: Atilano R. Cinco
- Nueva Ecija—2nd: Gabriel Belmonte
