= Paolo Ortega =

Filipino politician (born 1984)

Francisco Paolo Ortega V
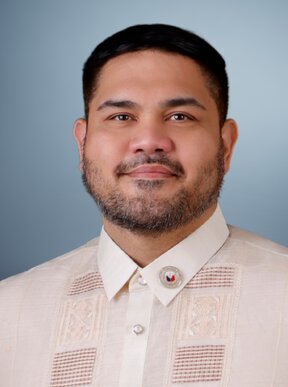
- Official portrait, 2025

Deputy Speaker of the House of Representatives of the Philippines
- Incumbent
- Assumed office August 11, 2025
- House Speaker: Martin Romualdez; Faustino "Bojie" Dy III

Member of the Philippine House of Representatives from La Union's 1st district
- Incumbent
- Assumed office June 30, 2022
- Preceded by: Pablo C. Ortega

Member of the La Union Provincial Board from the 1st District
- In office June 30, 2019 – June 30, 2022

Member of the San Fernando City Council
- In office June 30, 2010 – June 30, 2019

Barangay Kagawad of San Fernando, La Union
- In office 2007–2010

Personal details
- Born: Francisco Paolo Padua Ortega V April 14, 1984 (age 42) Philippines
- Party: Lakas (2009–2012; 2023–present)
- Other political affiliations: NPC (2018–2023); Independent (2007–2009; 2015–2018); Liberal (2012–2015)
- Relations: Ortega family
- Education: San Beda University (BS); Ateneo de Manila University (MPM); Philippine Christian University (Ph.D.)
- Occupation: Politician

Francisco Paolo Padua Ortega V (born April 14, 1984), also known as Paolo Ortega, is a Filipino politician serving as the incumbent representative of the first district of La Union since 2022. He was elected as one of the Deputy Speakers of the House of Representatives on August 11, 2025.

== Early life and education ==
Ortega earned his Bachelor of Science in Commerce Major in Marketing Management from San Beda University in Manila. He later pursued graduate studies at the Ateneo de Manila University School of Government, obtaining a Master of Arts in Public Management, and eventually a Doctor of Philosophy in Development Administration from the Philippine Christian University.

== Political career ==
Ortega first entered public service as a Barangay Kagawad of San Fernando, La Union from 2007 to 2010. He later served three consecutive terms as City Councilor from 2010 to 2019. He also held positions as a member of the Board of Regents of the Don Mariano Marcos Memorial State University – La Union and as an ex-officio board member of the Philippine Councilors League – La Union.

In 2022, Ortega was elected as the Representative of La Union's 1st Congressional District. He assumed office on June 30, 2022. On August 11, 2025, he was elected Deputy Speaker of the House of Representatives.

== Personal life ==
Ortega belongs to the political Ortega family of La Union. He is the son of Pablo C. Ortega.

== Electoral history ==
Electoral history of Paolo Ortega
Year	Office	Party	Votes received				Result
Year	Office	Party	Total	%	P.	Swing	Result
2010	Councilor (San Fernando, La Union)	Lakas-Kampi	35,695	—N/a	3rd	—N/a	Won
2013	Councilor (San Fernando, La Union)	Liberal	34,064	—N/a	2nd	—N/a	Won
2016	Councilor (San Fernando, La Union)	Independent	32,550	—N/a	2nd	—N/a	Won
2019	Board Member (La Union–1st)	NPC	108,761	—N/a	1st	—N/a	Won
2022	Representative (La Union–1st)	NPC	144,295	76.80%	1st	—N/a	Won
2025	Representative (La Union–1st)	Lakas	143,823	73.45%	1st	-3.37	Won
