= Titing Ortega =

Filipino politician (1916–1996)

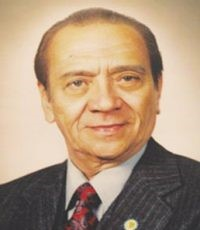

Head of National Tobacco Administration
- In office December 1992 – January 1995
- President: Fidel V. Ramos
- Preceded by: Edilberto V. Cariaso
- Succeeded by: Amante E. Siapno

23rd Governor of La Union
- In office February 2, 1988 – June 30, 1992
- Vice Governor: Aida M. Aspiras
- Preceded by: Robert V. Dulay
- Succeeded by: Justo O. Orros Jr.

Member of the Batasang Pambansa from La Union
- In office June 30, 1984 – March 25, 1986
- Preceded by: Office established
- Succeeded by: Office abolished

Member of the Batasang Pambansa from Region I's at-large district
- In office June 12, 1978 – June 5, 1984
- Preceded by: Office established
- Succeeded by: Office abolished

Member of the House of Representatives from La Union's 1st district
- In office December 30, 1969 – September 23, 1972
- Preceded by: Magnolia Antonino
- Succeeded by: District abolished Post later held by Victor Ortega

Personal details
- Born: Joaquin Lacsamana Ortega Jr. November 7, 1916 San Fernando, La Union, Philippine Islands
- Died: September 20, 1996 (aged 79) Los Angeles, California, U.S.
- Party: Nacionalista (1969–1978, 1988–1992); Bileg Ti La Union (local party; 1987–1992)
- Other political affiliations: KBL (1978–1986)
- Spouse: Felicula Nuesa
- Relations: Ortega family
- Children: 5
- Parent(s): Joaquin Ortega (father); Francisca Lacsamana (mother)
- Relatives: Francisco Ortega (brother)
- Occupation: Politician

Joaquin Tomas "Titing" Lacsamana Ortega Jr. (November 7, 1916 – September 20, 1996) was a Filipino politician. He served as governor of La Union from 1988 to 1992, and as head of the National Tobacco Administration from 1992 to 1995. He represented the 1st district of La Union in the House of Representatives of the Philippines from 1969 to 1972.

== Early life ==
Joaquin Tomas Ortega Jr. was born on November 7, 1916 in San Fernando, La Union to Joaquin Ortega Sr., the governor of La Union from 1901 to 1904, and Francisca Lacsamana Ortega. He had 13 siblings, among whom was his elder brother Francisco ("Pacoy").

== Political career ==
Following the footstep of his father, Ortega attempted to run for an electoral position six times before getting voted as La Union 1st district representative in 1969. He had 3,000 more votes than his closest opponent Victor Ortega who was also his nephew.

In 1972 after the declaration of martial law by president Ferdinand Marcos, Ortega who is a Nacionalista member lost his position after the Congress was disbanded.

From 1978, Ortega returned to the legislature as a member representing La Union in the Interim Batasang Pambansa. The legislature became the Regular Batasang Pambansa in 1984 which was dissolved in the 1986 People Power Revolution which deposed Marcos.

In January 1988, Ortega was elected as governor of La Union. He held the position until 1992.

In December 1992, Ortega was appointed head of the National Tobacco Administration (NTA) by President Fidel V. Ramos, succeeding Edilberto V. Cariaso. During an interview with The New Yorker correspondent Stan Sesser in 1993, Ortega was asked about the issue of street children and teenagers selling and using cigarettes, to which he answered: "They’re part of the industry. We consider them vital cogs in the industry, because they provide a service to drivers who have no time to buy cigarettes. Isn’t this better for them than stealing or shoplifting?" He also expressed his view that children engaged in smoking was not a problem: "I don’t think smoking affects a person unless he’s genetically disposed to cancer. Should you tell a seven-year-old boy to stop eating sugar since sugar can cause diabetes?" He vacated his position by January 1995, and was succeeded by Amante E. Siapno.

== Personal life ==
He was married to Felicula Nuesa with whom he have five children. His son, Carlos Ortega became La Union provincial board member from 1995 to 2001.
