= José Ozámiz =

Spanish Filipino lawyer and politician (1898–1944)

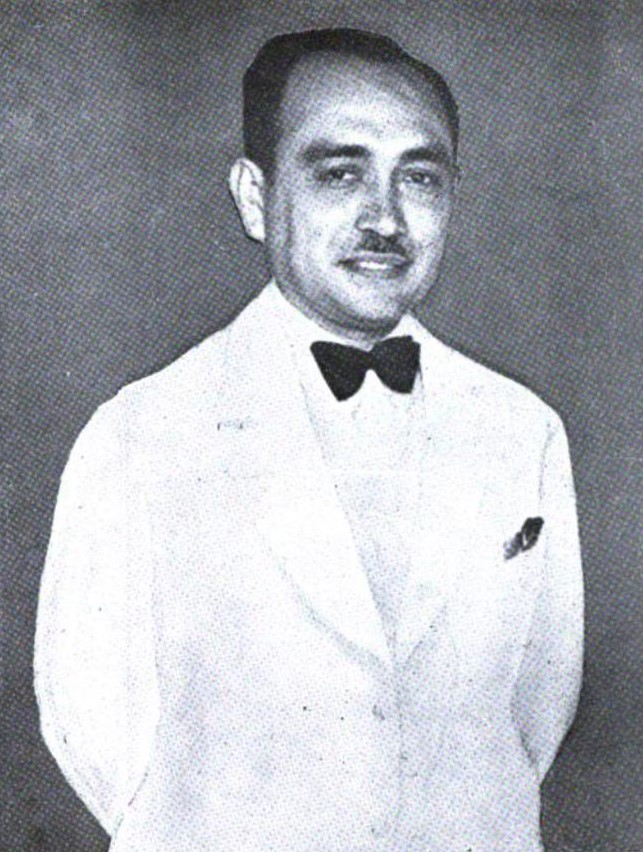
- Photograph from The Commercial & Industrial Manual of the Philippines, 1941

Chairman of the Games and Amusements Board
- In office 1943–1944
- President: Jose P. Laurel

Senator of the Philippines
- Died before taking office

Member of the National Assembly from Misamis Occidental's at-large district
- In office September 16, 1935 – December 30, 1941
- Preceded by: Himself
- Succeeded by: District abolished (Next held by Eugenio Stuart del Rosario and Rufino Abadiez)

Member of the House of Representatives from Misamis Occidental's at-large district
- In office June 2, 1931 – September 16, 1935
- Preceded by: District established
- Succeeded by: Himself

Governor of Misamis Occidental
- In office 1929–1931
- Preceded by: Position established
- Succeeded by: Anselmo Bernad

Personal details
- Born: José Ozámiz y Fortich; May 5, 1898 Jimenez, Misamis, Captaincy General of the Philippines
- Died: August 30, 1944 (aged 46) Manila, Commonwealth of the Philippines
- Cause of death: Execution by beheading
- Resting place: Manila North Cemetery
- Party: Nacionalista
- Spouse: Lourdes Hyndman
- Education: Ateneo de Manila (LL.B)
- Profession: Lawyer

José Ozámiz y Fortich (May 5, 1898 – August 30, 1944) was a Spanish Filipino lawyer and politician from Misamis Occidental.

== Early life ==
Ozámiz was born on May 5, 1898, in a house near the "old bridge" in Aloran to Jenaro Ozámiz from Basque Country, Spain and Basilisa Fortich, a Filipino mestizo of Spanish and Cebuano ancestry. Jenaro left Spain at age sixteen and came to Aloran, then ended up at the Municipality of Jimenez and engaged in the business of abacá and copra trading which made him very rich, acquiring through the years 3.55 km^{2} (1.37 sq mi) in the tile province and a 10 km^{2} (3.9 sq mi) ranch in Bukidnon. Ozámiz spoke his first languages Spanish, Cebuano, Tagalog and English when the Philippines came under American rule.

He was the oldest and the only son among ten children. His sisters are Pacita, Consuelo, Carmen, Pilar, Remedios, Nieves, Mercedes, Paulita, and Lourdes. Three of his sisters, Consuelo, Carmen, and Nieves, remained distinct and never got married. Two entered politics: Consuelo was a councilor for six terms in Jimenez, and Remedios became a congresswoman of Bukidnon. Remedios' son, Carlos Fortich, became governor of Bukidnon.

In 1904, the Ozámiz family transferred to a big house in Jimenez, where they engaged in the copra business and shipped them to other islands in the Philippines.

== Legal career ==
Ozámiz graduated from Ateneo de Manila and became a lawyer on September 24, 1921. Actively practicing law, he was a counsel of big companies in Manila, like Madrigal Shipping and Dela Rama Steamship, both owned by senators.

== Political career ==
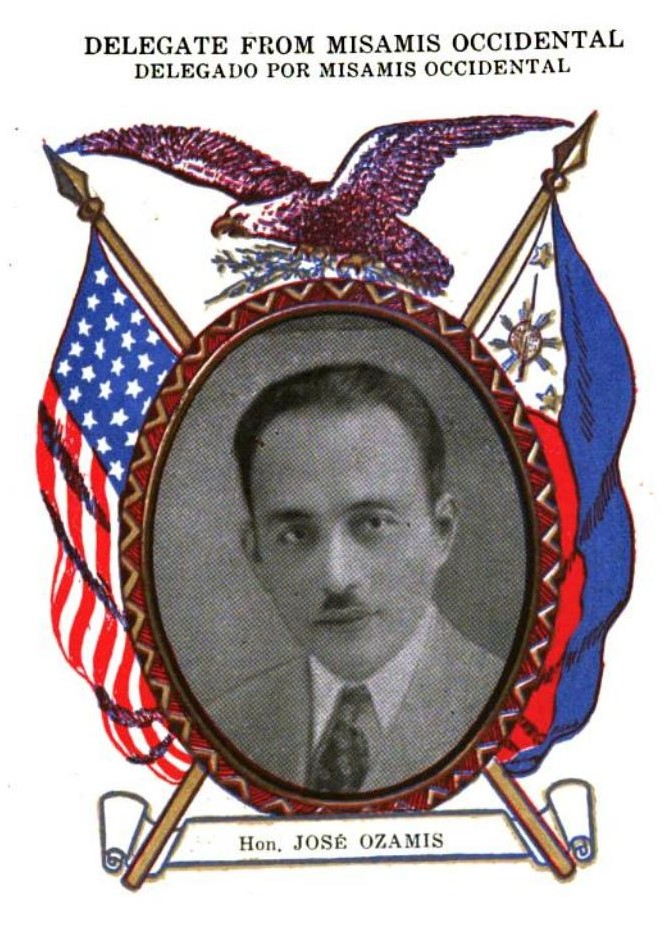
Ozámiz as a delegate to the Philippine Constitutional Convention, published by Benipayo Press (c. 1935)

Ozámiz was appointed as Misamis Occidental's first provincial governor and served from 1929 to 1931. He was later elected as representative of the lone district of Misamis Occidental from 1931 to 1941. He was a delegate to the 1935 Constitutional Convention that resulted in the creation of the 1935 Constitution for the Philippine Commonwealth Government. In 1941, he was elected to the Philippine Senate. However, he did not serve his term as senator due to Imperial Japan invading the Philippines during World War II. He was executed before he could assume office.

== World War II ==
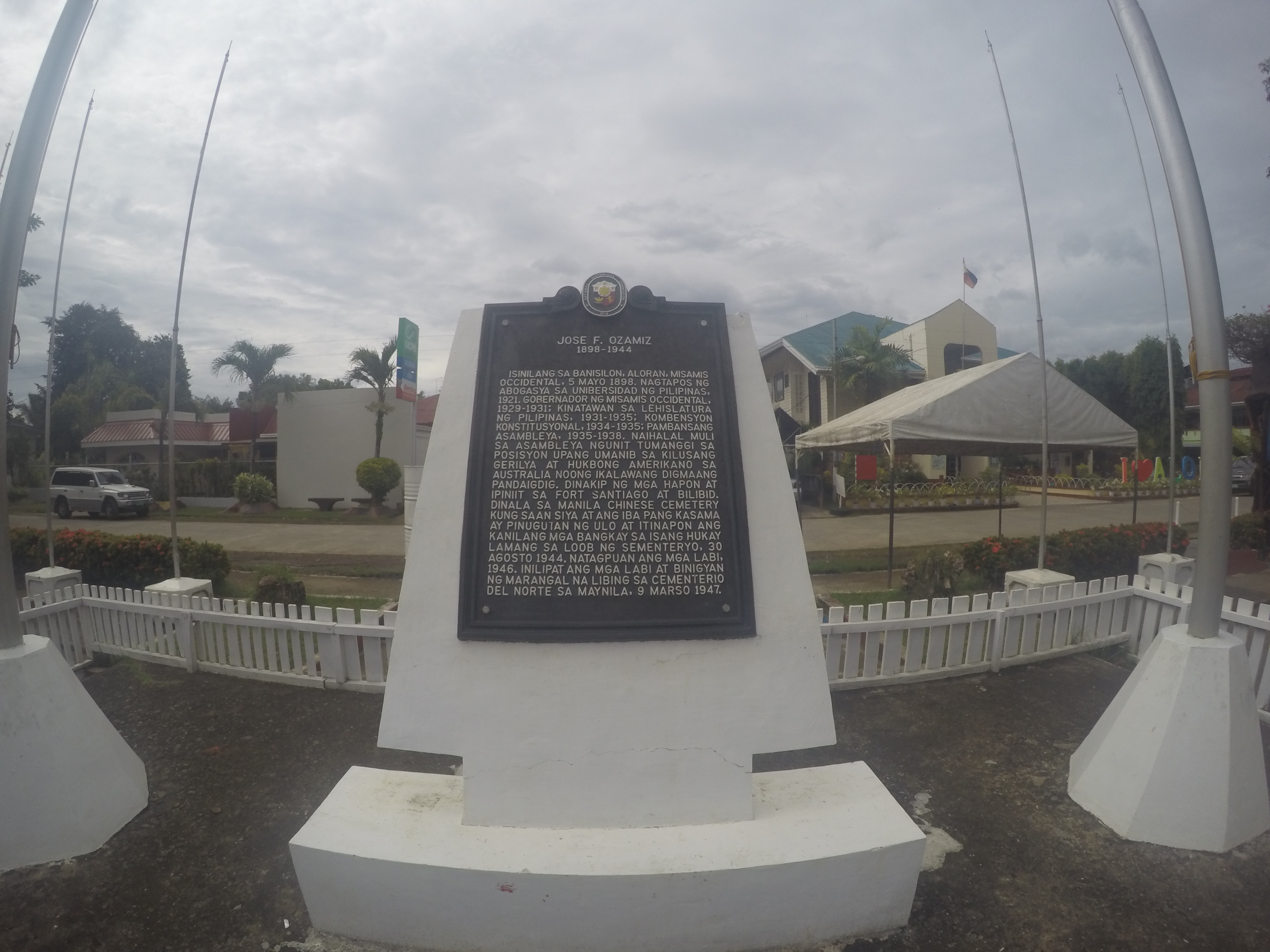
Historical marker of José Ozámiz at the Aloran Town Plaza

When the Japanese occupied the country during World War II, Ozámiz was among those who accepted a post in the Japanese government with the blessings of the guerrilla movement who saw that his position would allow him to move discreetly. He became chairperson of the Games and Amusement Board. In May 1943, he came to Mindanao to contact Fertig. He came by boat accompanied by Jose Maria and Pelong Campos of Aloran. During his arrival in Mindanao, he met Fertig and Parson, both major leaders of the guerrilla movement.

On his way home, Ozámiz's family was under house arrest. He went back to Manila in February 1944. He was arrested by Japanese Kempetai on February 11 on his wife's birthday. He was condemned to be executed. A Filipino nicknamed "Makapili" played a part in his downfall along with twenty-nine other fellow Filipinos who were also arrested at the same time. They were the core of the guerilla movement in Manila.

Ozámiz was beheaded at the Manila North Cemetery, alongside 29 guerilla members, by the Japanese during their occupation of the Philippines during World War II for his involvement in the resistance movement.

== Legacy ==
- The city of Ozamiz (which used to be called Misamis) in the province of Misamis Occidental was posthumously named in his honor.
- Nailon Primary School of Nailon, Tudela, Misamis Occidental was renamed after him, which is now Ozamiz Elementary School in Camarin, Cabol-anonan, Tudela, Misamis Occidental (Barangay Cabol-anonan was once part of Barangay Nailon).
