= Julio Nalundasan =

Filipino lawyer and politician

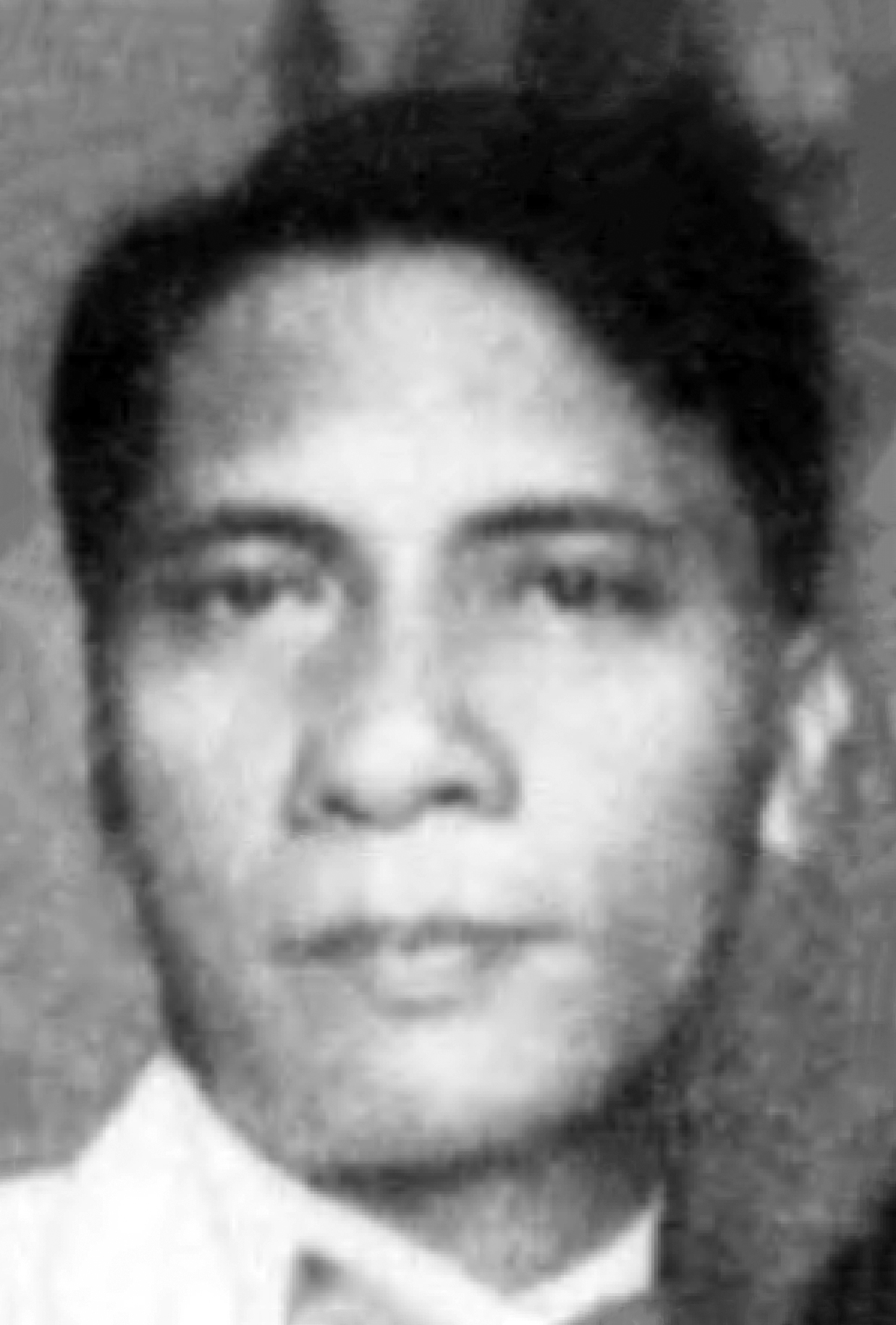

Member of the Philippine House of Representatives from Ilocos Norte's 2nd District
- In office July 10, 1934 – September 20, 1935
- Preceded by: Emilio Medina
- Succeeded by: Ulpiano Arzadon

Personal details
- Born: July 21, 1894 Batac, Ilocos Norte, Captaincy General of the Philippines
- Died: September 20, 1935 (aged 41) Laoag, Ilocos Norte, Philippine Islands
- Cause of death: Murder by gunshot
- Resting place: Manila North Cemetery
- Party: Nacionalista Democrático
- Spouse: Angelina Nalundasan
- Profession: Lawyer

Julio Nalundasan (July 21, 1894 – September 20, 1935) was a Filipino lawyer and politician who was one of the political rivals of Ilocos Norte politician Mariano Marcos, the father of Ferdinand Marcos, who would become president of the Philippines for 20 years.

Nalundasan was first elected as representative of the second district of Ilocos Norte in 1934, beating Mariano Marcos. They competed again in 1935, this time for assemblyman, and he was re-elected. He was killed by a sniper at his home on September 20, 1935, just two days after being proclaimed the winner. Marcos's son, Ferdinand, and brother-in-law, Quirino Lizardo, were later convicted for the murder. However, the conviction was overturned by the Supreme Court of the Philippines, through a decision by then-Associate Justice Jose P. Laurel.
