= National Assembly of the Philippines =

Unicameral legislative body of the Commonwealth of the Philippines from 1935 until 1941

- Philippines
- 1940 Coat of arms of the Philippines

Type
- Type: Unicameral

History
- Established: May 14, 1935
- Disbanded: June 18, 1940

Leadership
- Speaker of the Assembly: Gil Montilla (Assemblyman, Negros Occidental–3rd) Nacionalista Democratico (1935–1939); José Yulo (Assemblyman, Negros Occidental–3rd) Nacionalista (1939–1941)
- Deputy Speaker: José Zulueta (Assemblyman, Iloilo–1st) Nacionalista Democratico/Nacionalista
- Majority Floor Leader: José E. Romero (Assemblyman, Negros Oriental–2nd) Nacionalista (1935–1938); Quintin Paredes (Assemblyman, Abra–Lone) Nacionalista (1938–1941)

Structure
- Seats: 89 members (1935); elected 98 members (1938); elected
- Length of term: 3 years
- Authority: Article VI, 1935 Constitution of the Philippines

Elections
- Voting system: First-past-the-post voting

Meeting place
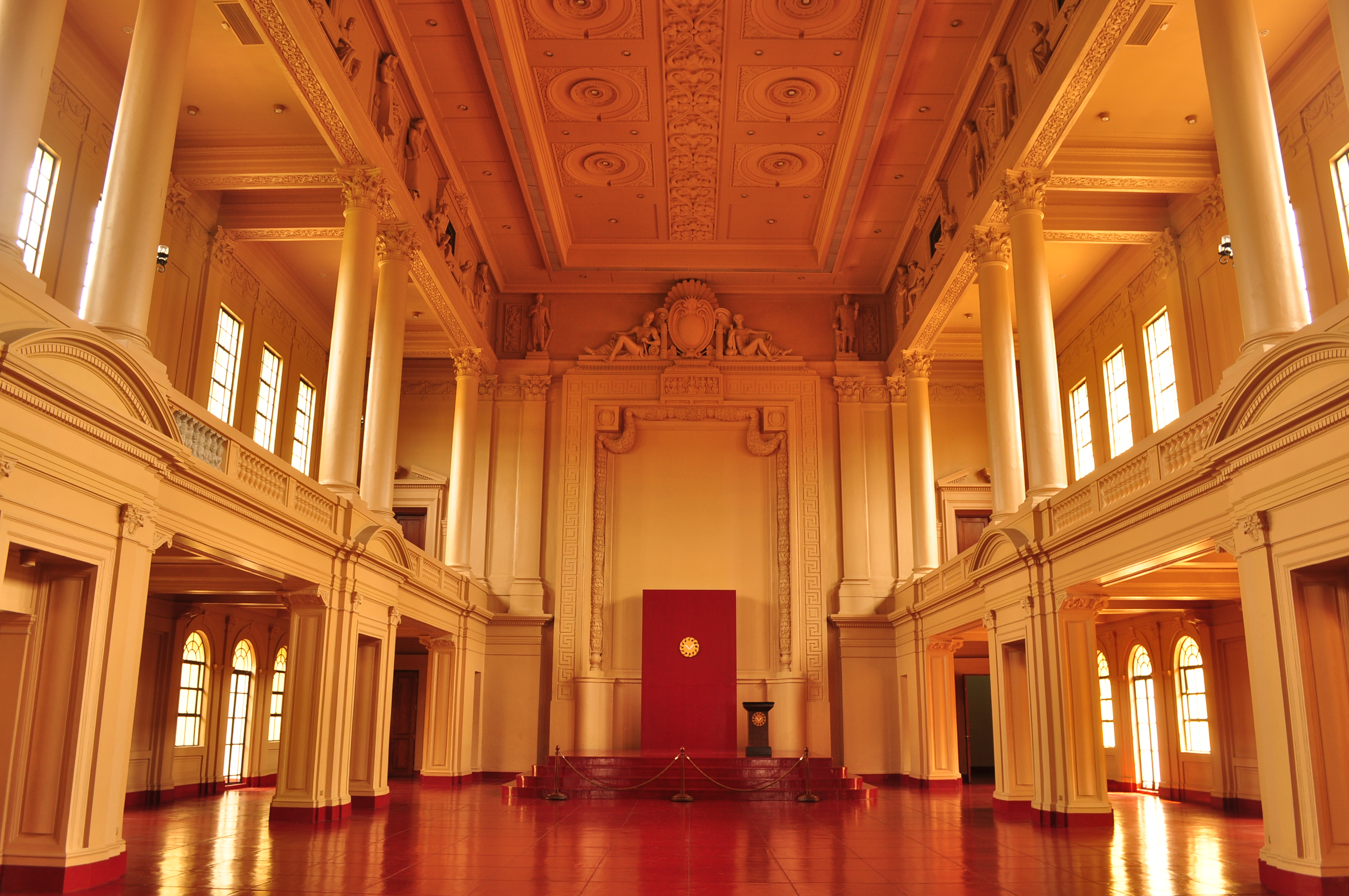
- Legislative Building, Padre Burgos Avenue, Ermita, Manila

The National Assembly of the Philippines (Tagalog: Kapulungáng Pambansâ ng Pilipinas, Spanish: Asamblea Nacional de Filipinas) refers to the legislature of the Commonwealth of the Philippines from 1935 to 1941, and of the Second Philippine Republic during the Japanese occupation. The National Assembly of the Commonwealth was created under the 1935 Constitution, which served as the Philippines' fundamental law to prepare it for its independence from the United States of America.

The National Assembly during the Japanese occupation of the Philippines during the Second World War in the Pacific was created by the 1943 Constitution. With the invasion of the Philippines, the Commonwealth government had gone into exile to the United States. It left behind a skeletal bureaucracy whose officials formed a government under the Japanese Imperial Army. In an attempt to win the loyalty of Filipinos, the Japanese established a nominally independent Republic of the Philippines, with a National Assembly as its legislative body. The Second Philippine Republic was only recognized by the Axis powers.

== Establishment ==
Prior to 1935, the Philippine Islands, an insular area of the United States had the bicameral Philippine Legislature as its legislative body. The Philippine Legislature was established in 1907 and reorganized in 1916, pursuant to a U.S. federal law known as the Jones Law. The Jones Law provided for a Senate and a House of Representatives, whose membership were elected except for a few, which were appointed by the U.S. Governor-General without the need for confirmation. The Governor-General, being the chief executive of the territory, also exercised the power to veto any of the Philippine Legislature's legislations.

In 1934, Filipino politicians obtained the passage of a Philippine independence law known as the Tydings–McDuffie Act. It was crafted to prepare the Philippines for its eventual independence after a ten-year period. The Tydings–McDuffie Act also enabled them to draft and adopt a constitution, subject to the concurrence of the U.S. president.

In the constitutional convention that followed, a unicameral National Assembly was adopted. This came after the failure of the constitutional convention delegates to agree on the setup of the bicameral system that was favored by the majority. It also set the ceiling on its membership to a maximum of 120, that were to be elected every three years; similar to what the Jones Law had provided. It entitled every province, regardless of its population to have at least one representative. The convention likewise provided for the direct election of representatives from the non-predominantly Christian areas previously appointed by the U.S. Governor-General.

== Commonwealth National Assembly ==
After the 1935 Constitution was ratified, elections were held on September 17, 1935, for the 98 members of the National Assembly; simultaneous with the elections for the Commonwealth President and Vice President. The Philippine Commonwealth was inaugurated on November 15, 1935, and thus the term of the elected officials began. The National Assembly first met officially on November 25, ten days after the Commonwealth government was inaugurated and elected Gil M. Montilla of Negros Occidental as its Speaker. It soon organized itself into three commissions and 40 standing committees, when it adopted its rules on December 6.

=== Legislation ===
The assembly had the task of passing laws to prepare the Philippines for its eventual independence. Certain laws dealing with foreign relations and finance however, still required the approval of the U.S. president. Commonwealth President Manuel L. Quezon, who had practical control of the National Assembly, addressed the body on its inaugural session and laid-out his administration's priorities and legislative agenda. He was able to secure the passage of important legislation without much opposition, after he diluted the powers of the Speaker to a mere presiding officer. Among the first of such measures were the National Defense Act of 1935, which created the Philippine Army; the creation of the National Economic Council, to serve as an advisory body on economic matters; and the creation of the Court of Appeals. Several economic measures were also tackled, including the impending difficulties on the phase out of free trade between the Philippines and the United States after independence, setting a minimum wage, and the imposition of new taxes among others.

Most of the bills enacted were drafted by the executive branch and the few that originated from the members themselves were often vetoed by Quezon. In the sessions of the First National Assembly in 1936, 236 bills were passed, of which 25 bills were vetoed; while on its 1938 session, 44 out of 105 bills were vetoed due to practical defects, including one which proposed to make religious instruction compulsory in schools – clearly violating the constitutional provision on the separation of Church and State. The sporadic vetoing of its legislation prompted the "rubber stamp" legislature to criticize Quezon's policies. It then began to assert its independence from the executive. In line with this, the National Assembly went on to reinstate the inherent powers of the Speaker.

It was also in this period that Filipino women were finally extended universal suffrage following a special, all-female plebiscite held on April 30, 1937, where 447,725 women voted favorably for it, against 44,307.

The second elections for the National Assembly were held on November 8, 1938, under a new law that allowed block voting, which favored the governing Nacionalista Party. As expected all the 98 seats of the National Assembly went to the Nacionalistas. José Yulo who was Quezon's Secretary of Justice from 1934 to 1938, was elected Speaker.

The Second National Assembly passed legislation to strengthen the economy, unfortunately war loomed. Certain laws passed by the First National Assembly were modified or repealed to meet existing realities. A controversial immigration law that set an annual limit of 50 immigrants per country, which affected mostly Chinese and Japanese nationals escaping the Sino-Japanese War was passed in 1940. Since the law bordered on foreign relations it required the approval of the U.S. president, which was nevertheless obtained. When the result of the 1939 census was published, the National Assembly updated the apportionment of legislative districts, which became the basis for the 1941 elections.

=== Restoration of the bicameral legislature ===
Quezon was barred by the 1935 Constitution to serve as president beyond 1941. He orchestrated a set of amendments to the constitution that included restoring the bicameral legislature. It provided for the replacement of the National Assembly by the Congress of the Philippines, composed of a Senate and a House of Representatives. Unlike the Jones Law Senate (1916 to 1935), whereby two senators were elected from each of the twelve senatorial districts the Philippines was divided into, the 1940 Amendments prescribed that all the 24 senators were to be elected at-large. They were to serve for a staggered 6-year term, so that one-third of the Senate membership is replaced every two years. Similar to the National Assembly, the House of Representatives had a cap of 120 members. The amendments which were contained under Resolution No. 38 were adopted by the National Assembly on September 15, 1939, and were ratified in a plebiscite on June 18, 1940. U.S. President Franklin D. Roosevelt approved it on December 2, 1940, effectively paving the way for the abolition of the National Assembly after the incumbency of those elected in 1938 on December 30, 1941.

=== Outbreak of World War II ===
Concerns about international conflict and the first stages of the World War II stretched throughout most of the Second National Assembly. In 1940, the National Assembly declared a state of national emergency which gave the President extensive emergency powers. On December 8, 1941, Japan attacked the Philippines a few hours after attacking Pearl Harbor. The National Assembly lost no time in enacting substantive legislation diverting all remaining funds for national defense and declaring a state of total emergency. It furthered the emergency powers already granted to the President, such as the transfer of the seat of government and the extension of the effectivity of lapsing laws. In its last act, the National Assembly certified the results of the 1941 elections which reelected Manuel L. Quezon and Sergio Osmeña as president and vice president, respectively.

== Second Republic National Assembly ==
The Commonwealth government was exiled in Washington, D.C. upon the invitation of Pres. Roosevelt. The Japanese took over Manila on January 2, 1942, and soon established the Japanese Military Administration to replace the exiled Commonwealth government. It utilized the existing administrative structure already in place and coerced high-ranking Commonwealth officials left behind to form a government. In order to win greater support for Japan and its war effort, no less than Japanese Prime Minister Hideki Tōjō promised the Filipinos independence earlier than the Tydings–McDuffie Act had scheduled. But before it could be realized a constitution would have to be adopted. The Preparatory Commission for Philippine Independence drafted what came to be known as the 1943 Constitution. It provided for a unicameral National Assembly that was to be composed of provincial governors and city mayors as ex-officio members and an elected representative from each province and city who were to serve for a term of three years. Though created subordinate to the executive, the National Assembly had the power to elect the President, who in turn appoints the provincial governors and city mayors, ensuring him control of the legislature.

=== National Assembly convenes ===
Jorge B. Vargas, chairman of the Philippine Executive Commission addressed the National Assembly at its pre-independence session on September 25, 1943, where KALIBAPI Director-General Benigno Aquino, Sr. of Tarlac, who served as Agriculture Secretary in the Commonwealth government was elected Speaker of the National Assembly. On the other hand, former Commonwealth Justice Secretary and Acting Supreme Court Chief Justice José P. Laurel was elected President of the soon-to-be-independent Republic of the Philippines. The National Assembly also went to organize itself into 66 committees.

Philippine independence was eventually proclaimed on October 14, 1943. Laurel called the National Assembly into a special session from October 17 to 23, when it passed resolutions expressing gratitude to the Japanese for its grant of independence. The National Assembly met for its first regular session from November 25, 1943, to February 2, 1944. It passed a total of 66 bills and 23 resolutions, ranging from the creation of new government agencies to address the existing problems and conditions during the war and other problems which had not been addressed during the Commonwealth period. Since the Philippines now acted as an independent state, the National Assembly created the Ministry of Foreign Affairs and a Central Bank. It also extended additional powers to the President, similar to those granted to Quezon by the Commonwealth National Assembly.

=== Dissolution ===
When it ended its session on February 2, 1944, the National Assembly was never to meet again. It was scheduled to meet for its second regular session on October 20, 1944, but American forces had already begun their campaign to liberate the Philippines from Japan with its first attack on Manila on September 21, 1944. This prompted the Japanese to demand the Philippines' declaration of war against the United States. It was only heeded after a compromise was reached that no Filipino would be conscripted into the Japanese military. Realizing that such a declaration was not binding until ratified by the National Assembly, the Japanese also demanded that the National Assembly be convened to ratify it, but Laurel remained steadfast not to convoke the National Assembly into a special session. Two days after the surrender of Japan to the Allied forces on August 15, 1945, and with the Commonwealth government already restored in Manila, Laurel who was by then in prison in Japan dissolved the Second Philippine Republic. Meanwhile, all the laws passed by the Second Republic's National Assembly were invalidated by a proclamation of Gen. Douglas MacArthur on October 23, 1944 just right after reestablishing the Commonwealth government in Tacloban.

== See also ==
- Congress of the Philippines
- Commonwealth of the Philippines
- Second Philippine Republic
