= List of female senators of the Philippines =

This is a list of women senators of the Philippines. It is a guide to identify the women in the Philippines who have served as senators in the Senate of the Philippines, as distinct from the existing whole list of Philippine senators.

Since 1947, there have been 24 Filipino women senators in Philippine history. In the ongoing 20th Congress, there are 5 incumbent female senators.

== History ==
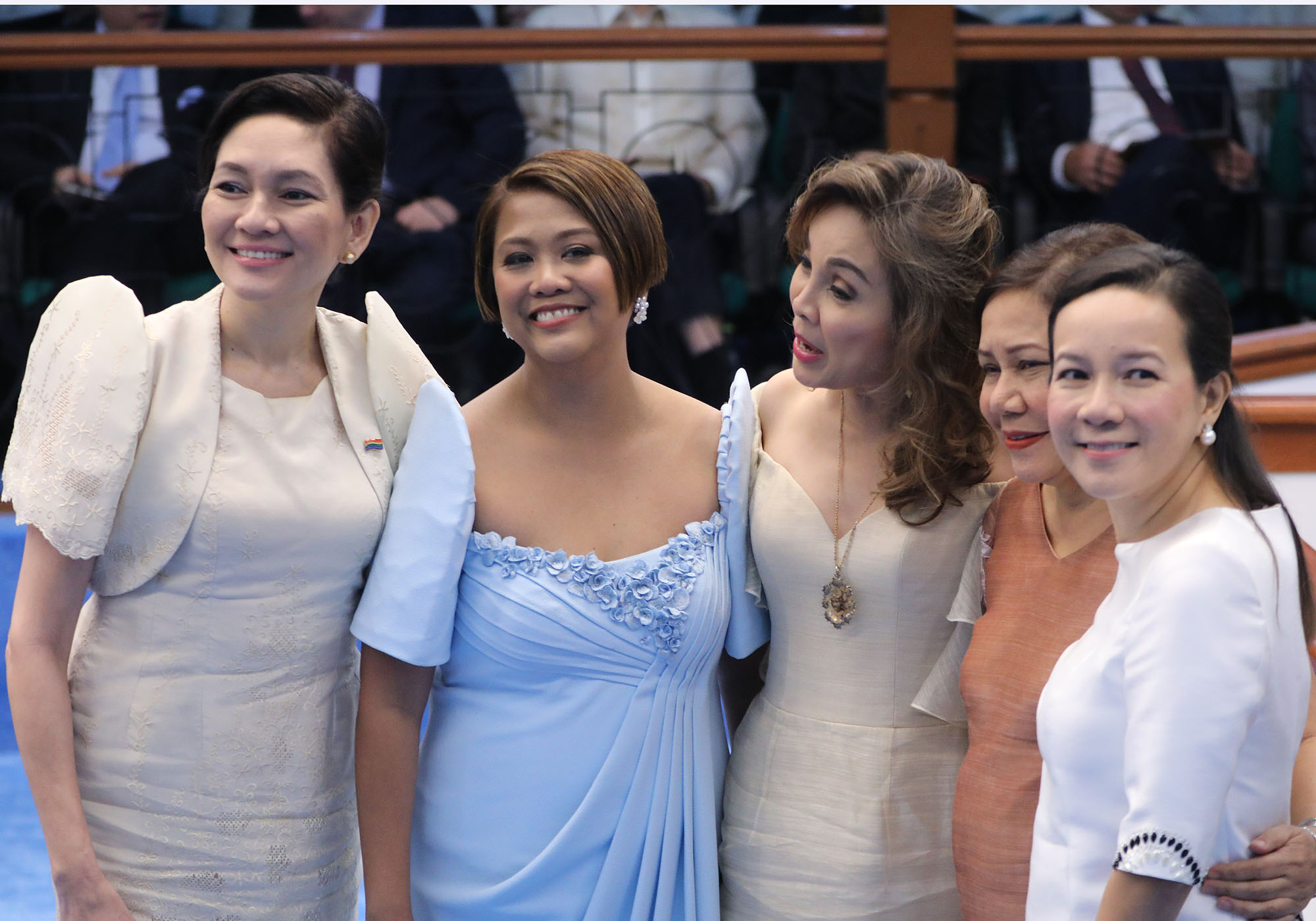
Female senators of the 17th Congress in 2018

The first female senator elected in the Philippines was Geronima Pecson, who reaped the third largest number of votes during the Philippine senatorial elections of 1947. During her senatorial term, Pecson headed the Senate Committee on Education, the Senate Committee on Health and Public Welfare, and the Joint Congressional Committee on Education.

Eva Estrada-Kalaw was the first woman to be re-elected as senator.

Tecla San Andres Ziga was the first woman in the Philippines to top the bar examinations for law degree graduates. She was elected as a senator in 1963.

Leticia Ramos-Shahani became the first Filipino woman to become president pro tempore of the Senate in 1993.

Santanina Rasul is the first Filipina Muslim senator.

Miriam Defensor Santiago was the first Filipino and first Asian from a developing country to be elected as a judge of the International Criminal Court (ICC) on December 12, 2011. She later resigned the post due to suspected ME/CFS, which turned out to be lung cancer.

Gloria Macapagal Arroyo was the first female senator who was elected as vice president (1998–2001) and later installed to the presidency (2001–2010). She became the first female speaker of the House of Representatives in 2018.

Loren Legarda is the first Philippine female senator to top the Senate race twice in 1998 and 2007. She also became the first woman to serve as Majority Floor Leader of the Senate of the Philippines as well as the second woman to serve as President Pro Tempore of the Senate of the Philippines. She was also the youngest senator during the 11th Congress. She is the only female member of the Senate's history to serve in four different decades. Legarda is currently serving her fourth term as a senator, making her the longest-serving female senator in the Philippines.

Pia Cayetano is the youngest woman elected senator in Philippine history at the age of 38. She was elected in 2004, then re-elected in 2010. She returned to the Senate in 2019. Upon her reelection in 2025, she became the second woman to be elected to a fourth term as senator.

Loi Ejercito Estrada became the first first spouse (to Joseph Ejercito Estrada) to be elected in the Senate. She served from 2001 to 2007 after her husband's removal from the presidency in 2001.

Risa Hontiveros is the Philippines' first democratic socialist woman senator, representing the Akbayan party. In 2022, she became the first Filipino to serve as Deputy Minority Floor Leader of the Senate. In 2025, she became the first woman to occupy the post of Deputy Majority Floor Leader.

== Female senators ==
* denotes incumbent senator

Portrait	Name (lifespan)	Election	Years in service	Congress	Prior political experience (Note: Before first election to the Senate; does not include positions held prior to reelection after having served for at least one term)	Party (Note: Party membership during senatorial tenure only)
	Geronima Pecson (1896–1989)	1947	1947–1953	1st, 2nd	Assistant Executive Secretary to President Manuel Roxas	Liberal
	Pacita Madrigal-Warns (1915–2008)	1955	1955–1961	3rd, 4th	Secretary of Social Welfare and Development (1953–1955)	Nacionalista
	Maria Kalaw-Katigbak (1912–1992)	1961	1961–1967	5th, 6th		Liberal
	Tecla Ziga (1906–1992)	1963	1963–1969	5th, 6th	Secretary of Social Welfare and Development (1962–1963)	Liberal
	Eva Estrada-Kalaw (1920–2017)	1965 1971	1965–1972	6th, 7th		Nacionalista
	Magnolia Antonino (1915–2010)	1967	1967–1972	6th, 7th	Representative, La Union's 1st district (1965–1967)	Nacionalista
	Helena Benitez (1914–2016)	1967	1967–1972	6th, 7th		Nacionalista
	Leticia Ramos-Shahani (1929–2017)	1987 1992	1987–1998	8th, 9th, 10th	Under-Secretary-General of the United Nations for Social Development and Humanitarian Affairs (1981–1986)	LDP (until 1992)
	Leticia Ramos-Shahani (1929–2017)	1987 1992	1987–1998	8th, 9th, 10th	Under-Secretary-General of the United Nations for Social Development and Humanitarian Affairs (1981–1986)	Lakas (from 1992)
	Nina Rasul (1930–2024)	1987 1992	1987–1995	8th, 9th	Commissioner for Muslim and Other Ethnic Minorities (1978–1987)	Liberal (until 1992)
	Nina Rasul (1930–2024)	1987 1992	1987–1995	8th, 9th	Commissioner for Muslim and Other Ethnic Minorities (1978–1987)	Lakas (from 1992)
	Gloria Macapagal Arroyo (born 1947)	1992 1995	1992–1998	9th, 10th	Undersecretary of Trade and Industry (1989–1992)	Lakas
	Nikki Coseteng (born 1952)	1992 1995	1992–2001	9th, 10th, 11th	Representative, Quezon City's 3rd district (1987–1992)	NPC
	Miriam Defensor-Santiago (1945–2016)	1995 2004 2010	1995–2001; 2004–2016	10th, 11th, 13th, 14th, 15th, 16th	Secretary of Agrarian Reform (1989–1990)	PRP
	Loren Legarda (born 1960)	1998 2007 2013 2022	1998–2004, 2007–2019, 2022–present	11th, 12th, 14th, 15th, 16th, 17th, 19th, 20th		Lakas (until 2003)
	Loren Legarda (born 1960)	1998 2007 2013 2022	1998–2004, 2007–2019, 2022–present	11th, 12th, 14th, 15th, 16th, 17th, 19th, 20th		Independent (2003–2005)
	Loren Legarda (born 1960)	1998 2007 2013 2022	1998–2004, 2007–2019, 2022–present	11th, 12th, 14th, 15th, 16th, 17th, 19th, 20th		NPC (from 2005)
	Tessie Aquino-Oreta (1944–2020)	1998	1998–2004	11th, 12th	Representative, Malabon–Navotas's lone district (1987–1998)	LDP
	Loi Ejercito (born 1930)	2001	2001–2007	12th, 13th	First Lady of the Philippines (1998–2001)	Independent (until 2004)
	Loi Ejercito (born 1930)	2001	2001–2007	12th, 13th	First Lady of the Philippines (1998–2001)	PMP (from 2004)
	Jamby Madrigal (born 1958)	2004	2004–2010	13th, 14th	Presidential Adviser for Children's Affairs (1999–2001)	LDP (until 2007)
	Jamby Madrigal (born 1958)	2004	2004–2010	13th, 14th	Presidential Adviser for Children's Affairs (1999–2001)	PDP–Laban (2007–2009)
	Jamby Madrigal (born 1958)	2004	2004–2010	13th, 14th	Presidential Adviser for Children's Affairs (1999–2001)	Independent (from 2009)
	Pia Cayetano (born 1966)	2004 2010 2019 2025	2004–2016; 2019–present	13th, 14th, 15th, 16th, 18th, 19th, 20th		Lakas (until 2007)
	Pia Cayetano (born 1966)	2004 2010 2019 2025	2004–2016; 2019–present	13th, 14th, 15th, 16th, 18th, 19th, 20th		Nacionalista (from 2007)
	Grace Poe (born 1968)	2013 2019	2013–2025	16th, 17th, 18th, 19th	Chair, Movie and Television Review and Classification Board (2010–2012)	Independent
	Nancy Binay (born 1973)	2013 2019	2013–2025	16th, 17th 18th, 19th	Personal assistant to Vice President Jejomar Binay (2010–2013)	UNA
	Cynthia Villar (born 1950)	2013 2019	2013-2025	16th, 17th, 18th, 19th	Representative, Las Piñas's lone district (2001–2010)	Nacionalista
	Risa Hontiveros (born 1966)	2016 2022	2016–present	17th, 18th, 19th, 20th	Representative, Akbayan (2004–2010)	Akbayan
	Leila de Lima (born 1959)	2016	2016–2022	17th, 18th	Secretary of Justice (2010–2015)	Liberal
	Imee Marcos (born 1955)	2019 2025	2019–present	18th, 19th 20th	Representative, Ilocos Norte's 2nd district (1998–2007); Governor of Ilocos Norte (2010–2019)	Nacionalista
	Camille Villar (born 1985)	2025	2025–present	20th	Representative, Las Piñas's lone district (2019–2025)	Nacionalista

== Timeline of female senators ==
=== Per Congress ===
Women voted for their right suffrage and to run for public office in the 1937 Philippine women's suffrage plebiscite. The National Assembly was a unicameral legislature at this time. The 1940 Philippine constitutional plebiscites restored, among other things, the bicameral Congress, and the Senate was first elected in 1941.

Congress	Session	Election	Elected	Composition
1st Commonwealth Congress		1941	0 / 24	0 / 24
2nd Commonwealth Congress	1st–2nd	1946	0 / 24	0 / 24
1st Congress	1st–2nd	1946	0 / 24	
1st Congress	3rd–4th	1947	1 / 16	1 / 24
2nd Congress	1st–2nd	1949	0 / 8	1 / 24
2nd Congress	3rd–4th	1951	0 / 9	1 / 24
3rd Congress	1st–2nd	1953	0 / 8	0 / 24
3rd Congress	3rd–4th	1955	1 / 9	1 / 24
4th Congress	1st–2nd	1957	0 / 8	1 / 24
4th Congress	3rd–4th	1959	0 / 8	1 / 24
5th Congress	1st–2nd	1961	1 / 8	1 / 24
5th Congress	3rd–4th	1963	1 / 8	2 / 24
6th Congress	1st–2nd	1965	1 / 8	3 / 24
6th Congress	3rd–4th	1967	2 / 8	4 / 24
7th Congress	1st–2nd	1969	0 / 8	3 / 24
7th Congress	3rd–4th	1971	1 / 8	3 / 24
8th Congress		1987	2 / 24	2 / 24
9th Congress		1992	4 / 24	4 / 24
10th Congress		1995	3 / 12	4 / 24
11th Congress		1998	2 / 12	4 / 24
12th Congress		2001	1 / 13	3 / 24
13th Congress		2004	3 / 12	4 / 24
14th Congress		2007	1 / 12	4 / 24
15th Congress		2010	2 / 12	3 / 24
16th Congress		2013	4 / 12	6 / 24
17th Congress		2016	2 / 12	6 / 24
18th Congress		2019	5 / 12	7 / 24
19th Congress		2022	2 / 12	7 / 24
20th Congress		2025	3 / 12	5 / 24
