= 5th Congress of the Philippines =

22nd legislative term of the Philippines

←	4th	6th	→
- Old Legislative Building (c. 1988)

Overview
- Term: January 22, 1962 – December 17, 1965
- President: Diosdado Macapagal
- Vice President: Emmanuel Pelaez

Senate
- Members: 24
- President: Eulogio Rodriguez (until April 5, 1963); Ferdinand Marcos (from April 5, 1963)
- President pro tempore: Fernando Lopez
- Majority leader: Arturo Tolentino
- Minority leader: Estanislao Fernandez

House of Representatives
- Members: 104
- Speaker: Daniel Romualdez (until March 9, 1962); Cornelio Villareal (from March 9, 1962)
- Speaker pro tempore: Salipada Pendatun
- Majority leader: Justiniano Montano
- Minority leader: Cornelio Villareal (until March 9, 1962); Daniel Romualdez (from March 9, 1962)

The 5th Congress of the Philippines (Filipino: Ikalimang Kongreso ng Pilipinas), composed of the Philippine Senate and House of Representatives, met from January 22, 1962, until December 17, 1965, during the presidency of Diosdado Macapagal.

== Sessions ==
- First Regular Session: January 22 – May 17, 1962
- Second Regular Session: January 28 – May 23, 1963
- First Special Session: June 10 – July 12, 1963
- Third Regular Session: January 27 – May 21, 1964
- Second Special Session: May 22 – June 25, 1964
- Third Special Session: June 26 – July 8, 1964
- Fourth Special Session: August 3–15, 1964
- Fourth Regular Session: January 25 – May 20, 1965
- First Joint Session: March 1 – May 5, 1965
- Fifth Special Session: May 21 – June 24, 1965
- Sixth Special Session: June 30 – July 12, 1965
- Second Joint Session: December 14–17, 1965

== Legislation ==
The Fifth Congress passed a total of 1,192 laws. (Republic Act Nos. 3451 – 4642)

== Leadership ==
=== Senate ===
Senate President

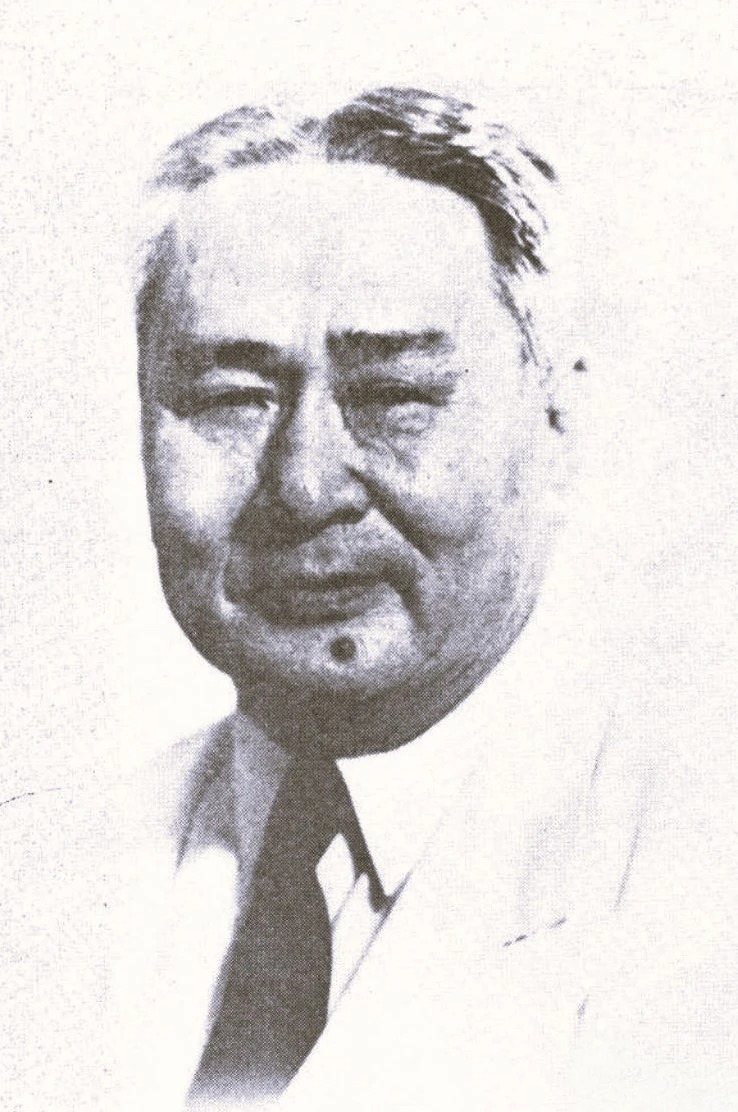
Eulogio Rodriguez,
until April 5, 1963

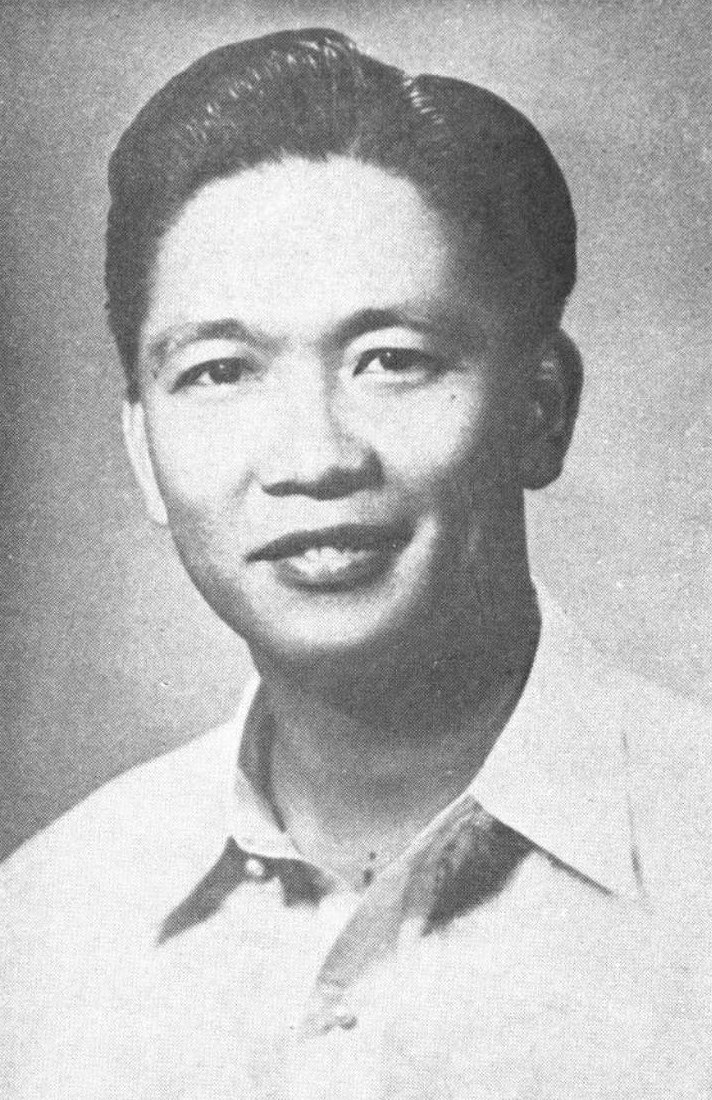
Ferdinand Marcos,
from April 5, 1963

- President:
  - Eulogio Rodriguez (Nacionalista), until April 5, 1963
  - Ferdinand Marcos (Liberal), from April 5, 1963
- President pro tempore: Fernando Lopez (Nacionalista)
- Majority Floor Leader: Arturo Tolentino (Nacionalista)
- Minority Floor Leader: Estanislao Fernandez (Liberal)

=== House of Representatives ===
House Speaker

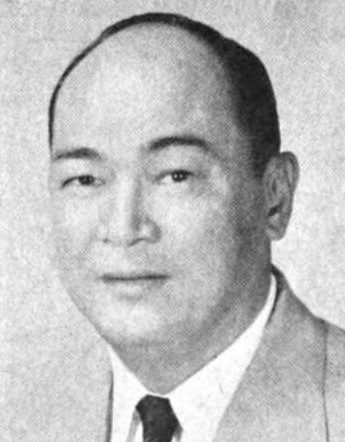
Daniel Romualdez,
until March 9, 1962

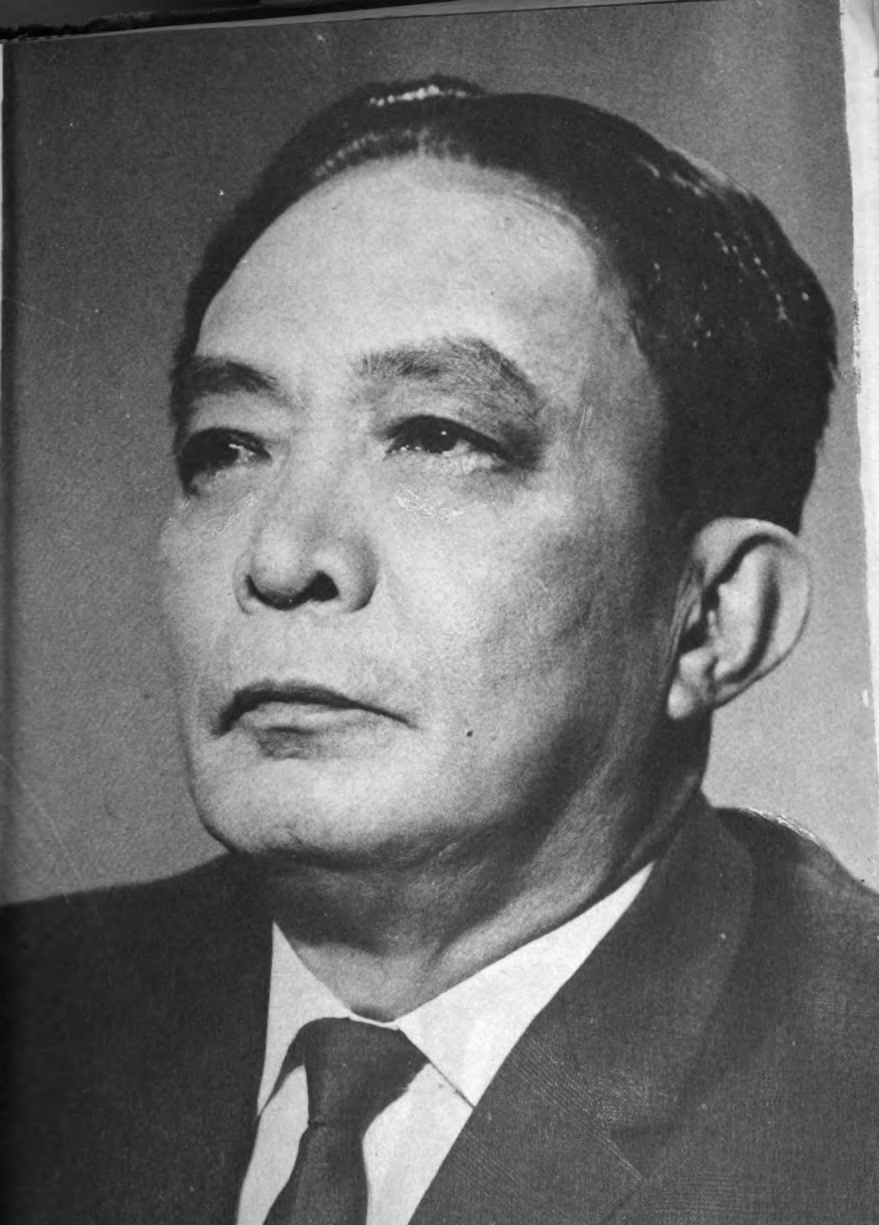
Cornelio Villareal,
from March 9, 1962

- Speaker:
  - Daniel Romualdez (Leyte–1st, Nacionalista), until March 9, 1962
  - Cornelio Villareal (Capiz–2nd, Liberal), from March 9, 1962
- Speaker pro tempore: Salipada Pendatun (Cotabato, Liberal)
- Majority Floor Leader: Justiniano Montano (Cavite, Nacionalista)
- Minority Floor Leader:
  - Cornelio Villareal (Capiz–2nd, Liberal), until March 9, 1962
  - Daniel Romualdez (Leyte–1st, Nacionalista), from March 9, 1962

== Members ==
=== Senate ===
Composition of the Senate during the 5th Congress' 1st and 2nd (left), and 3rd & 4th (right) sessions.

The following are the terms of the senators of this Congress, according to the date of election:

- For senators elected on November 12, 1957: December 30, 1957 – December 30, 1963
- For senators elected on November 10, 1959: December 30, 1959 – December 30, 1965
- For senators elected on November 14, 1961: December 30, 1961 – December 30, 1967
- For senators elected on November 12, 1963: December 30, 1963 – December 30, 1969

Senator	Party	Term end
Alejandro Almendras	Nacionalista	1965
Gaudencio Antonino	Liberal	1967
Eulogio Balao	Nacionalista	1963
Mariano Jesus Cuenco (Note: Mariano Jesus Cuenco died on February 25, 1964.)	Nacionalista	1965
Rogelio de la Rosa	Liberal	1963
Jose W. Diokno	Nacionalista	1969
Estanislao Fernandez	Liberal	1965
Rodolfo Ganzon	Nacionalista	1969
Maria Kalaw Katigbak	Liberal	1967
Oscar Ledesma	Nacionalista	1963
Roseller T. Lim	Nacionalista	1963
Juan Liwag	Liberal	1969
Fernando Lopez	Nacionalista	1965
Genaro Magsaysay	Nacionalista	1965
Manuel Manahan	Progressive	1967
Raul Manglapus	Progressive	1967
Ferdinand Marcos	Liberal	1965
Camilo Osias	Liberal	1967
Ambrosio Padilla	Liberal	1963, 1969
Cipriano Primicias Sr.	Nacionalista	1963
Gil Puyat	Nacionalista	1963, 1969
Soc Rodrigo	Nacionalista	1967
Eulogio Rodriguez (Note: Eulogio Rodriguez died on December 19, 1964.)	Nacionalista	1965
Gerry Roxas	Liberal	1969
Jose Roy	Nacionalista	1967
Tecla San Andres Ziga	Liberal	1969
Lorenzo Sumulong	Nacionalista	1967
Lorenzo Tañada	NCP	1965
Arturo Tolentino	Nacionalista	1963, 1969

=== House of Representatives ===
Composition of the House of Representatives during the 5th Congress.

Fifth Congress representation map of the Philippines

Province/City	District	Representative	Party
Abra	Lone	Lucas P. Paredes	Nacionalista
Agusan	Lone	Guillermo Sanchez	Nacionalista
Aklan	Lone	Godofredo Ramos	Nacionalista
Albay	1st	Venancio Ziga	Nacionalista
Albay	2nd	Justino Nuyda	Nacionalista
Albay	3rd	Josefina Duran	Liberal
Antique	Lone	Tobias Fornier (Note: Tobias Fornier died on October 31, 1964.)	Nacionalista
Bataan	Lone	Jose Nuguid	Nacionalista
Batanes	Lone	Jorge Abad (Note: Jorge Abad was appointed as Secretary of Public Works, Transportation and Communications on June 22, 1964.)	Liberal
Batangas	1st	Apolinario Apacible (Note: Apolinario Apacible died on August 22, 1963.)	Nacionalista
Batangas	1st	Luis N. Lopez (Note: Luis N. Lopez was elected on November 12, 1963, to succeed Apolinario Apacible.)	Liberal
Batangas	2nd	Apolinario Marasigan	Nacionalista
Batangas	3rd	Jose Laurel Jr.	Nacionalista
Bohol	1st	Natalio Castillo	Nacionalista
Bohol	2nd	Bartolome Cabangbang	Nacionalista
Bohol	3rd	Maximino Garcia	Nacionalista
Bukidnon	Lone	Cesar Fortich	Nacionalista
Bulacan	1st	Teodulo Natividad	Nacionalista
Bulacan	2nd	Rogaciano Mercado	Nacionalista
Cagayan	1st	Tito Dupaya	Nacionalista
Cagayan	2nd	Benjamin Ligot	Nacionalista
Camarines Norte	Lone	Marcial Pimentel	Liberal
Camarines Sur	1st	Juan Triviño	Nacionalista
Camarines Sur	2nd	Felix Fuentebella	Nacionalista
Capiz	1st	Gerry Roxas (Note: Gerry Roxas took office as Senator of the Philippines on December 30, 1963.)	Liberal
Capiz	2nd	Cornelio Villareal	Liberal
Catanduanes	Lone	Jose M. Alberto	Liberal
Cavite	Lone	Justiniano Montano	Nacionalista
Cebu	1st	Ramon Durano Sr.	Nacionalista
Cebu	2nd	Jose Briones	Liberal
Cebu	3rd	Maximino Noel	Nacionalista
Cebu	4th	Isidro Kintanar	Nacionalista
Cebu	5th	Miguel Cuenco	Nacionalista
Cebu	6th	Manuel Zosa	Nacionalista
Cebu	7th	Tereso Dumon	Nacionalista
Cotabato	Lone	Salipada Pendatun	Liberal
Davao	Lone	Ismael Veloso	Liberal
Ilocos Norte	1st	Antonio Raquiza	Liberal
Ilocos Norte	2nd	Simeon Valdez	Nacionalista
Ilocos Sur	1st	Floro Crisologo	Liberal
Ilocos Sur	2nd	Pablo Sanidad	Liberal
Iloilo	1st	Pedro Trono	Liberal
Iloilo	2nd	Rodolfo Ganzon (Note: Rodolfo Ganzon took office as Senator of the Philippines on December 30, 1963.)	Nacionalista
Iloilo	3rd	Ramon Tabiana (Note: Ramon Tabiana died on December 20, 1964.)	Liberal
Iloilo	4th	Ricardo Ladrido	Nacionalista
Iloilo	5th	Jose Aldeguer	Nacionalista
Isabela	Lone	Delfin Albano	Nacionalista
La Union	1st	Francisco Ortega	Nacionalista
La Union	2nd	Manuel Cases	Liberal
Laguna	1st	Joaquin Chipeco	Nacionalista
Laguna	2nd	Wenceslao Lagumbay	Nacionalista
Lanao del Norte	Lone	Laurentino Badelles	Nacionalista
Lanao del Sur	Lone	Rashid Lucman	Liberal
Leyte	1st	Daniel Romualdez	Nacionalista
Leyte	2nd	Primo Villasin	Liberal
Leyte	3rd	Marcelino Veloso	Nacionalista
Leyte	4th	Dominador Tan	Nacionalista
Manila	1st	Fidel A. Santiago	Liberal
Manila	2nd	Joaquin R. Roces	Nacionalista
Manila	3rd	Ramon Bagatsing	Liberal
Manila	4th	Justo Albert	Liberal
Marinduque	Lone	Francisco Lecaroz	Nacionalista
Masbate	Lone	Emilio Espinosa Jr.	Nacionalista
Misamis Occidental	Lone	William Chiongbian (Note: William Chiongbian was removed by the Supreme Court on March 17, 1962, after an electoral protest.)	Liberal
Misamis Occidental	Lone	Guillermo Sambo (Note: Guillermo Sambo replaced William Chiongbian on March 17, 1962, after winning an electoral protest.)	Nacionalista
Misamis Oriental	Lone	Vicente de Lara	Liberal
Mountain Province	1st	Alfredo Lamen	Independent
Mountain Province	2nd	Ramon P. Mitra	Nacionalista
Mountain Province	3rd	Luis Hora	Nacionalista
Negros Occidental	1st	Vicente Gustilo Sr. (Note: Vicente Gustilo Sr. died on December 17, 1962.)	Nacionalista
Negros Occidental	1st	Armando Gustilo (Note: Armando Gustilo was elected on November 12, 1963, to succeed Vicente Gustilo Sr.)	Nacionalista
Negros Occidental	2nd	Inocencio Ferrer	Nacionalista
Negros Occidental	3rd	Agustin M. Gatuslao	Nacionalista
Negros Oriental	1st	Lorenzo Teves	Nacionalista
Negros Oriental	2nd	Lamberto Macias	Nacionalista
Nueva Ecija	1st	Eugenio Baltao	Liberal
Nueva Ecija	2nd	Felicisimo Ocampo	Liberal
Nueva Vizcaya	Lone	Leonardo B. Perez	Nacionalista
Occidental Mindoro	Lone	Felipe Abeleda	Liberal
Oriental Mindoro	Lone	Luciano Joson	Liberal
Palawan	Lone	Gaudencio Abordo	Nacionalista
Pampanga	1st	Francisco Nepomuceno	Liberal
Pampanga	2nd	Emilio Cortez	Nacionalista
Pangasinan	1st	Aguedo Agbayani	Nacionalista
Pangasinan	2nd	Angel Fernandez	Liberal
Pangasinan	3rd	Cipriano Primicias Jr.	Nacionalista
Pangasinan	4th	Amadeo J. Perez	Liberal
Pangasinan	5th	Luciano Millan	Nacionalista
Quezon	1st	Manuel S. Enverga	Nacionalista
Quezon	2nd	Eladio Caliwara	Liberal
Rizal	1st	Rufino D. Antonio	Liberal
Rizal	2nd	Jovito Salonga	Liberal
Romblon	Lone	Jose D. Moreno	Nacionalista
Samar	1st	Eladio Balite	Nacionalista
Samar	2nd	Fernando Veloso	Nacionalista
Samar	3rd	Felipe Abrigo	Nacionalista
Sorsogon	1st	Salvador Encinas	Nacionalista
Sorsogon	2nd	Vicente Peralta	Nacionalista
Southern Leyte	Lone	Nicanor Yñiguez	Nacionalista
Sulu	Lone	Salih Ututalum	Nacionalista
Surigao del Norte	Lone	Reynaldo Honrado	Nacionalista
Surigao del Sur	Lone	Vicente Pimentel	Liberal
Tarlac	1st	Peping Cojuangco	Nacionalista
Tarlac	2nd	Constancio Castañeda	Nacionalista
Zambales	Lone	Virgilio Afable	Nacionalista
Zamboanga del Norte	Lone	Alberto Ubay	Nacionalista
Zamboanga del Sur	Lone	Vincenzo Sagun	Nacionalista

== See also ==
- Congress of the Philippines
- Senate of the Philippines
- House of Representatives of the Philippines
- 1961 Philippine general election
- 1963 Philippine general election
