= Victor Ziga =

Filipino politician (1945–2021)

The Honorable Victor San Andres Ziga
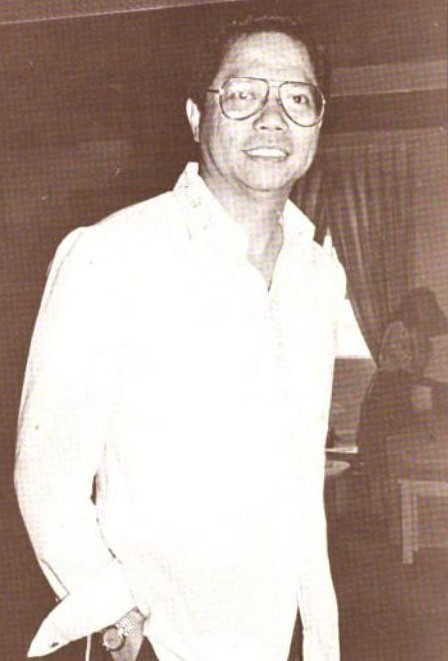
- Ziga as a senator, photograph released by the Philippine Congress, c. 1988

Senator of the Philippines
- In office June 30, 1987 – June 30, 1992

23rd Governor of Albay
- In office April 10, 1995 – June 30, 1995
- Vice Governor: Jesus James B. Calisin; Marcial E. Tuanqui
- Preceded by: Dominador Imperial Lim (Acting)
- Succeeded by: Al Francis Bichara

Mambabatas Pambansa (Assemblyman) from Albay
- In office June 30, 1984 – March 25, 1986 Serving with Pedro M. Marcellana, Jr. and Peter A. Sabido

Personal details
- Born: Victor San Andres Ziga; September 30, 1945 Manila, Philippine Commonwealth
- Died: January 31, 2021 (aged 75) Taguig, Philippines
- Party: Liberal (1988–2021)
- Other political affiliations: UNIDO (1984–1988)
- Spouse: Carmen Olbes Velasco
- Children: 6
- Parents: Venancio Ziga (father); Tecla San Andres Ziga (mother)
- Education: Ateneo de Manila University University of Santo Tomas
- Occupation: Lawyer

Victor "Vic" San Andres Ziga Sr. (September 30, 1945 – January 31, 2021) was a Filipino politician who served as senator in the 8th Congress. He was an assemblyman for Albay in the Regular Batasang Pambansa prior to getting elected as senator. He also served as Governor of Albay and cabinet minister in the Corazon Aquino administration.

== Early life and career ==
Ziga was born on 30 September 1945 in Manila to parents Venancio Ziga, former governor and congressman of Albay, and Tecla San Andres Ziga, a former Senator and who was the first woman who topped number 1 in the Bar Examination in the Philippines.

Ziga studied in Ateneo de Naga University, Ateneo de Manila University, University of Santo Tomas and the University of California in Los Angeles. He passed the bar in 1975.

== Political career ==
Ziga ran in and won the 1984 Batasang Pambansa elections. He filed various bills such as the establishment of the National Rehabilitation Center for drug addicts, requiring secondary schools to teach avoiding drug addiction and abuse and increasing the minimum basic monthly salaries of public school teachers.

In 1986, he was appointed the Cabinet Minister of General Services. In 1987, he was elected as a Philippine Senator. He was the Chairman of the Public works and highways committee and a member of the Commission on Appointments, Senate Electoral Tribunal and 16 other committees.

Ziga's interest and concern for those who have less in life is reflected in his association and involvement in typhoon relief operations and civic organizations, such as the free Medical Eye Specialist Mission and the Medical Mission of the Philippine General Hospital.

In 1991, he joined the Magnificent 12 in rejecting the new proposed treaty for Subic Naval Base. Ziga eventually left politics after losing his Senate re-election bid in 1992 and returned to the private sector as board director of San Miguel Corporation.

From April to June 1995, Ziga briefly returned to politics, serving as the governor of Albay.

== Personal life ==
Senator Ziga was married to Carmen Olbes Velasco with whom he had six children, including Victor Ziga Jr., who had served as a member of the Albay Provincial Board.

== Death ==
Victor Ziga died at January 31, 2021, at 75 years old. Senate President Sotto and Senate Majority Leader Migz Zubiri filed a resolution stating "the profound sympathy and sincere condolences of the Senate of the Philippines” on the Death of the Senator. Ziga's remains were cremated.
