= Tecla San Andres Ziga =

Filipina politician

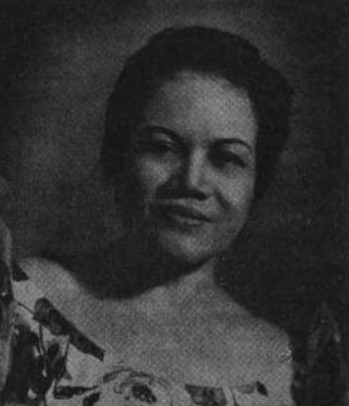

Senator of the Philippines
- In office December 30, 1963 – December 30, 1969
- Governor: Governor of the Integrated Bar of the Philippines for Bicol Region

Member of the House of Representatives from Albay's First District
- In office December 30, 1955 – December 30, 1961
- Preceded by: Lorenzo Ziga
- Succeeded by: Venancio Ziga

Personal details
- Born: Tecla Ravago San Andres; August 23, 1906 Nueva Caceres, Ambos Camarines, Philippine Islands
- Died: August 17, 1992 (aged 85) Manila, Philippines
- Party: Liberal
- Spouse: Venancio Ziga (m. 1941; died 1971)
- Education: University of the Philippines, Manila
- Occupation: Lawyer

Tecla Ravago San Andres Ziga (August 23, 1906 – August 17, 1992) was a female senator in the Philippines notable for being the first woman in the country to top the bar examination for law-degree graduates, for being the first Bicolana senator, the first woman representative of Albay, the first woman representative to be re-elected, the only female member of the Commission on Bar Integration, one of the first nine governor of the board of governors of the Integrated Bar of the Philippines. She was a Liberal Party politician whose legislative work prioritizes social welfare, women's rights, child protection, and public service. She and her son, Victor San Andres Ziga, were the first mother-and-son pair in Philippine history to have both served as senators.

== Biography ==
=== Early years ===
She was born August 23, 1906, in Nueva Caceres (now Naga, Camarines Sur) to Atanacio San Andres and Marcelina Ravago. She at least have two siblings, Enrique Ravago San Andres and Benjamin Ravago San Andres.

=== Education ===
San Andres Ziga obtained her elementary education from Santa Isabel College. She gained her high school education from the Catholic Central School (now known as Catholic Central School of Tabaco). In 1930, she obtained her degrees in liberal arts and law with honors from the University of the Philippines, Manila, garnering a remarkable 99% mark in procedural law. She took the bar examination in 1931.

Her legal education culminated in exceptional success at the Philippine Bar Examination, where she secured the top position with an overall rating of 89.4%, marking her as the first woman to achieve this distinction in the nation's history. She made history by becoming the first woman to place first in the bar examinations. The significance of the examination was highlighted by Associate Justice George A. Malcolm, who supervised the bar examinations that year. Malcolm praised both the integrity of the examination process and the competence of the successful candidates, stating that the examinees "passed strictly on their merits and honorably" and earned membership in the Philippine Bar "by right." His remarks underscored the legitimacy and prestige of San Andres's achievement at a time when women were still rare in the legal profession.

=== Career ===
San Andres Ziga first worked as an assistant attorney at the DeWitt Law Office at Dewitt, New York. She was the only female member of the highly prestigious and all-male law firm, and she worked there for seven years. After seven years there, she took and passed the 1937 Philippine Civil Service examination.

Government Career

Assistant Attorney at the Department of Justice (1937-1954)

In 1937, San Andres Ziga topped the bar exam, securing her appointment to the Department of Justice. At the DOJ, she served as a legal researcher and assistant attorney, playing a key role in the revision of Philippine legal codes through her participation as a member of the Code Committee, which involves analyzing and updating statutes to align with contemporary needs. Her years at the DOJ provided her with foundational experience in public administration, legal management, and policy formulation.

Congresswoman at the House of Representatives (1955-1961)

She was elected to the House of Representatives, representing Albay's 1st district, through a special election held on November 8, 1955, to serve the unfinished term of her late brother-in-law Lorenzo Ziga. She served the unexpired term, focusing initial legislative efforts on issues affecting women, children, and families. She was re-elected in 1957 and served until 1961, becoming the first woman representative of albay and the first woman representative to achieve a re-election, in 1957. Throughout her Congress term, she remained the sole female representative in the house, highlighting her pioneering status amid limited female representation and participation in Philippine national politics during her time. She was named as an Outstanding Legislator for 1956 to 1957 by the Congressional World, one of the 10 Outstanding Representatives of 1958 by the League of Women Voters, and one of the most outstanding legislators of 1961.

During her tenure in the House of Representatives, Tecla San Andres-Ziga was appointed as a member of the Special Committee created under House Resolution No. 59 to investigate Congressman Sergio Osmeña Jr.'s controversial privilege speech against President Carlos P. Garcia. Her participation in the committee was later cited in the landmark Supreme Court case Osmeña Jr. v. Pendatun (G.R. No. L-17144, October 28, 1960), which affirmed the power of Congress to discipline its own members.

First Senatorial Campaign (1961)

She first ran for a senate seat in 1961 but lost, ranking 9th. President Diosdado Macapagal then appointed her into his cabinet in 1962.

Secretary of the Department of Social Welfare and Development (1962-1963)

In 1962, President Diosdado Macapagal appointed her as the administrator of the Philippine Social Welfare Administration (now secretary-equivalent and now known as the Department of Social Welfare and Development). She became the administrator of the Philippine Social Welfare Administration, where she is the only woman member in the cabinet of President Macapagal, until her successful Senate campaign in 1963. Her term as the administrator of the Philippine Social Welfare Administration emphasized human rights and social justice initiatives amid post-war reconstruction challenges and disputes in the Philippines, including aid distribution, welfare, and support for disadvantaged groups such as children, women, and the impoverished. One documented action of the government office during her tenure as administrator involved coordinating SWA funds for provincial relief, as evidenced by her report to Malacañang on a P4,509 allocation from agency deposits to address local welfare needs in Davao. Her role as the administrator of the said government agency helped her win the 1963 Senate election. Andres-Ziga's advocacy aligned with post-war efforts to institutionalize and stabilize social protections.

Second Senatorial Campaign (1963)

Tecla San Andres Ziga's 1963 senatorial bid was directly endorsed and supported by the incumbent President Diosdado Macapagal and first lady Eva Macapagal. As the head of the Liberal Party, President Macapagal backed her senatorial campaign, following his previous 1962 appointment of Ziga as the Administrator of the Social Welfare Administration (the precursor to the DSWD).

During her successful 1963 senatorial campaign, San Andres-Ziga utilized campaign songs such as "Tecla Ziga Balitaw" and "Ziga for Senator March." The jingle was composed in the traditional balitaw style by Serafin Payawal with lyrics by Levi Celerio and was recorded by Sylvia La Torre. These jingles were used to promote her candidacy during the election that led to her election to the Philippine Senate in 1963.

Senator of the Republic of the Philippines (1963-1969)

She ran for a second time and was elected as a senator, becoming the 4th female senator of the Philippines, ranking 6th in the 1963 Senate election, running under the Liberal Party. She served as chair of several important Senate committees, including the Committee on Health, Committee on Social Justice and Public Welfare, as well as the Committee on Community Development, and General Services from 1963 to 1969. Furthermore, she's also a member of the following committees: agriculture and natural resources, education, foreign affairs, and blue ribbon. Her political agenda as senator focused on the protection of women and children and regulation of practice in dietetics, among others. She introduced and co-sponsored bills aimed to protect women and children, such as RA No. 2714, which created the Women's and Minors' Bureau (no longer an active standalone agency; its functions and records were eventually transitioned into the Bureau of Workers with Special Concerns); RA No. 2674, which regulated the practice of dietetics; and RA 2370, which provided the barrio autonomy. During her Senate tenure, she was named as one of the Outstanding Senators by the Philippine Free Press and was called " the conscientious dove of the senate."

She was the first female senator from Bicol Region and the first female bar top-notcher to serve in the Philippine Senate. During her tenure in the Philippine Senate (1963–1969), Tecla San Andres-Ziga remained a prominent political figure in the Bicol Region. Contemporary newspaper accounts and greetings published during the 1966 Peñafrancia festivities reflected her active public presence and close association with regional affairs alongside then Congressman Venancio P. Ziga.

Together with her son, Victor San Andres Ziga, Tecla San Andres-Ziga became the first mother-and-son pair in Philippine history to have both served as senators of the Philippines. She served from 1963 to 1969, while Victor Ziga served from 1987 to 1992. Their service did not overlap. More than a decade later, Luisa 'Loi' Ejercito Estrada and Jinggoy Ejercito Estrada became the first mother-and-son pair to serve concurrently in the Senate.

Third and Last Senatorial Campaign (1969)

Senator Tecla San Andres Ziga ran for re-election in 1969 (placing 12th place) but lost; she retired from politics.

Commission on Bar Integration Member (1970-1973)

Following her service in the Senate, Ziga remained active in the Philippine legal profession. In 1970, she was appointed a member of the Commission on Bar Integration, the body created by the Supreme Court to formulate and implement the integration of the Philippine Bar; she served as a member of the committee for 3 years (1970-1973). The commission was chaired by Associate Justice (later Chief Justice) Fred Ruiz Castro and included prominent members of the bench and bar. The Commission's work culminated in the landmark Supreme Court Resolution of January 9, 1973, which formally established the Integrated Bar of the Philippines (IBP).

Governor of the Integrated Bar of the Philippines (1973-1975)

In 1973, Ziga was elected as one of the first nine governors of the newly organized Integrated Bar of the Philippines (IBP) where she became the first female governor in the board of governors of the Integrated Bar of the Philippines, representing the Bicolandia (Bicol) region. She served on the inaugural Board of Governors following the establishment of the IBP as the official national organization of Philippine lawyers, her term formally commenced upon the constitution of the IBP in May 1973 and concluded around 1975.

Later Years

In her later years, she worked as a law professor at the University of the Philippines College of Law; she taught law subjects including but are not limited to legal and professional ethics, Rowena Guanzon became one of her studens during those times. During her time as a law professor, she wrote the 1975 paper Women in Politics and Government, acknowledging the role of Filipina politicians and public servants of her era. In the paper she mentioned numerous prominent women leaders, including herself and several of her contemporaries. Among those she highlighted was Leticia Ramos Shahani, then one of the pioneering women ambassadors of the Philippines, who would later become a senator in 1987 and, for a time, serve as her son's, Victor Ziga's colleague/friend in the senate.

Even after leaving elective office, Tecla San Andres-Ziga remained active in the legal profession. In People v. Barcena (G.R. No. L-34202, June 30, 1983), the Supreme Court identified former Senator Tecla San Andres-Ziga as counsel for the accused in a criminal appeal involving a conviction for homicide.

Tecla San Andres Ziga's contributions to Philippine law and politics continue to attract scholarly interest. In 1990, De La Salle University historians conducted and preserved an oral-history interview with her, entitled "The lady is a senator par excellance: An interview with Mrs. Tecla San Andres Ziga, one of the first women senators of the Philippines and the first women lawyer in the Senate." The interview forms part of the Marcelino A. Foronda Oral Histories Collection and remains an important primary source for researchers studying women in Philippine politics and legal history.

Legacy and Awards

In 1964, San Andres-Ziga was recognized during the Federation of Asian Women's Associations (FAWA) Convention held in Washington, D.C. A photograph published in Guam Times Weekly documented her receiving a commemorative plaque, highlighting the international recognition she received as a Filipino lawyer, legislator, and advocate for women's participation in public affairs.

In recognition of her distinguished career in law and public service, the Philippine Senate adopted Senate Resolution No. 006, s. 1992 on 18 August 1992.

The Naga City National Road traversing Barangay Peñafrancia, San Felipe, Pacol, Carolina, and Panicuason in Naga City, Camarines Sur is renamed "Senator Tecla R. San Andres Ziga Avenue" also known as Ziga Avenue in honor of Senator Tecla Ziga under the mayoral term of former vice president Leni Robredo of Naga City in 2025. Tecla San Andres Ziga is commemorated as one of the Philippines' pioneering women senators and was featured in the Senate Women's Month Tribute in 2025, recognizing her contributions as the country's first female bar top notcher and a trailblazing legislator; she is featured alongside other early women senators such as Geronima Pecson, Maria Kalaw Katigbak, Eva Estrada-Kalaw, Magnolia Antonino, and Helena Benitez.

=== Personal life ===
Tecla San Andres Ziga is part of the Ziga political dynasty; she was the wife of Venancio Ziga, a former governor and then congressman of the first district of Albay, Camarines Sur. They are the parents of Victor Ziga Sr., a former assemblyman and governor of Albay, who also became a senator. Tecla San Andres Ziga is the grandmother of Victor "Bong" Ziga Jr. who served as a member of the Albay Provincial Board. She is also a relative of Caroline Ziga So, a provincial board member of Albay's 1st district. Her predecessor, the congressman of Albay's 1st district, Lorenzo Ziga, is her brother-in-law.

Tecla San Andres Ziga firmly believe that women must take an active role in advancing their own rights and opportunities. Reflecting this conviction, she wrote in 1975 in her Women in Politics and Government paper that "while it is true that the Filipino woman has not yet been fully granted full equality under Philippine laws, the burden of responsibility to help achieve equality rests on us, the women, ourselves."

=== Death ===
She died 17 August 1992, in Manila, at the age of 85. In recognition of her distinguished career in law and public service, the Philippine Senate adopted Senate Resolution No. 006, s. 1992 on 18 August 1992, expressing its "profound sympathies, condolences, and high admiration" to her family. The resolution honored her service as a former senator of the Republic and acknowledged her enduring contributions to the nation.
