= Venancio Ziga =

Filipino lawyer and politician (1904-1970)

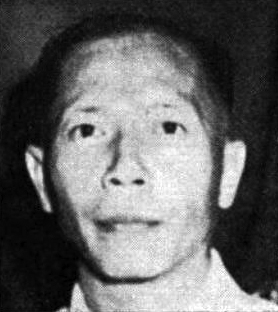
- Ziga in 1967

Member of the Philippine House of Representatives from Albay's 1st district
- In office December 30, 1961 – December 30, 1969
- Preceded by: Tecla San Andres Ziga
- Succeeded by: Amando Cope

17th Governor of Albay
- In office June, 1946 – December 30, 1951
- Preceded by: Saturnino Benito
- Succeeded by: Manuel Maronilla Calleja

Personal details
- Born: Venancio Prieto Ziga; March 24, 1904 Bacacay, Albay, Philippine Islands
- Died: January 26, 1970 (aged 65) Quezon City, Philippines
- Party: Liberal
- Spouse: Tecla San Andres (m. 1941)
- Occupation: Lawyer, politician

Venancio Prieto Ziga (March 24, 1904 – January 26, 1970) was a Filipino lawyer and politician. He represented the Albay's first district in the House of Representatives from 1961 to 1969. He served as Governor of Albay in the Philippines from 1946 to 1951.

== Early life and education ==
Ziga was born in Bacacay, Albay on March 24, 1904. He is the eldest son of Engracio Yu Ziga and Petrona Prieto. He finished his secondary education in Albay Provincial High School. He also finished pre-law course in the University of the Philippines, Manila and took up law at the University of Santo Tomas. In 1937, he passed the bar examinations.

== Career ==
Ziga was elected as municipal councilor of Tabaco in 1940. During outbreak of World War II, he was recruited by the USAFFE and joined Bataan Death March.

In 1946, Ziga was appointed to Governor of Albay by President Manuel Roxas.

In 1961, Ziga was elected as first district representative of Albay for two consecutive terms.

== Personal life ==
Ziga was the husband of Senator Tecla San Andres Ziga, a public servant and lawyer. They have only one son, Victor Ziga who were later elected as a Senator of the Philippines.
