= Vicente Peralta =

Filipino lawyer and politician (1914–1968)

- Peralta's official portrait during the 6th Congress

Member of the Philippine House of Representatives from Sorsogon's 2nd district
- In office December 30, 1953 – June 13, 1968
- Preceded by: Tomas Clemente
- Succeeded by: Rafael Aquino

Personal details
- Born: October 27, 1914 Sorsogon, Sorsogon, Philippine Islands
- Died: June 13, 1968 (aged 53)
- Party: Nacionalista (1953–1968)
- Spouse: Mercedes Berenguer
- Children: 8
- Education: University of the Philippines (LLB)

Vicente Leyva Peralta (October 27, 1914 – June 13, 1968) was a Filipino lawyer and politician who served as the representative for Sorsogon's 2nd congressional district in the Philippine House of Representatives from 1953 until his death in office in 1968.

== Early life and education ==
Vicente Leyva Peralta was born on October 27, 1914, in Sorsogon, Sorsogon, to Elias Peralta and Consolacion Leyva. He attended Sorsogon Provincial High School for his secondary education and received a Bachelor of Laws degree from the University of the Philippines (UP) in 1938. He placed ninth in that year's bar examination, with an average of 87.2%.

Peralta was recognized by the Friendship Chest of America for his excellence in high school economics. During college, his law thesis, entitled "Judicial Approach and the Problem of the Constitution," received second prize from the UP College of Law. He also belonged to several campus organizations, serving as speaker pro tempore of the UP Junior House of Representatives, president of the UP Law senior class, and law representative to the UP Student Council. He received various awards in oratory and debate, including a championship in extemporaneous speech in 1938.

== Early career ==
Peralta held several civil service eligibilities. He topped the second-grade civil service examination in 1935, with an average of 92.6%, and passed the first-grade examination. He also qualified as an immigration inspector, served as a member of the Board of Special Inquiry, and placed tenth in a government examination in bill drafting and legislative research.

Before entering politics, Peralta worked as a junior attorney at the Bureau of Mines from 1936 to 1941 and served as a member of the bureau's Board of Special Inquiry. He later held various positions, including senior attorney in the legal division of the Bureau of Civil Service, acting governor of Sorsogon in 1946, chairman of the Nacionalista Party provincial committee, and technical assistant to the 1949 Philippine mission to the United States. He also traveled to Europe and the Middle East to observe political and economic trends.

== House of Representatives ==
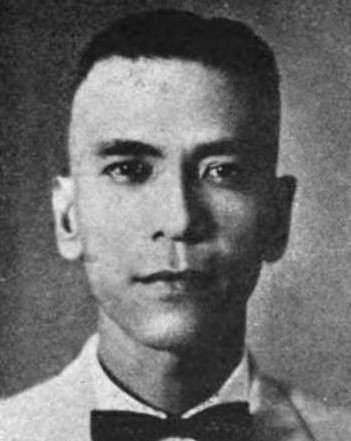
Peralta's official portrait during the 3rd Congress

Peralta was first elected to the House of Representatives in 1953, representing Sorsogon's 2nd congressional district and defeating incumbent Tomas Clemente. He was re-elected to three consecutive terms in 1957, 1961, and 1965.

During the 3rd Congress, he chaired the House Committee on Civil Service and served as a member of the committees on Revision of Laws, Transportation, and Ways and Means. He retained the chairmanship of the Committee on Civil Service during the 4th Congress and served on all standing committees on economic affairs. In the 6th Congress, he was a member of six House committees.

Peralta ran for a seat in the Senate in 1963 but lost, placing eleventh.

He died in office on June 13, 1968.

== Personal life ==
Peralta was married to Mercedes Berenguer, who was also from his hometown of Sorsogon, and had eight children.

== Electoral history ==
Electoral history of Vicente Peralta
Year	Office	Party	Votes received				Result
Year	Office	Party	Total	%	P.	Swing	Result
1953	Representative (Sorsogon–2nd)	Nacionalista	17,108	54.06%	1st	—N/a	Won
1957	Representative (Sorsogon–2nd)	Nacionalista	—N/a	—N/a	1st	—N/a	Won
1961	Representative (Sorsogon–2nd)	Nacionalista	—N/a	—N/a	1st	—N/a	Won
1965	Representative (Sorsogon–2nd)	Nacionalista	26,321	49.96%	1st	—N/a	Won
1963	Senator of the Philippines	Nacionalista	2,605,605	33.79%	11th	—N/a	Lost

House of Representatives of the Philippines
Preceded by Tomas Clemente	Member of the Philippine House of Representatives for Sorsogon's 2nd district 1965–1969	Succeeded by Rafael Aquino
