= 1963 Philippine Senate election =

18th Philippine senatorial election

- November 12, 1963

8 (of the 24) seats in the Senate 13 seats needed for a majority
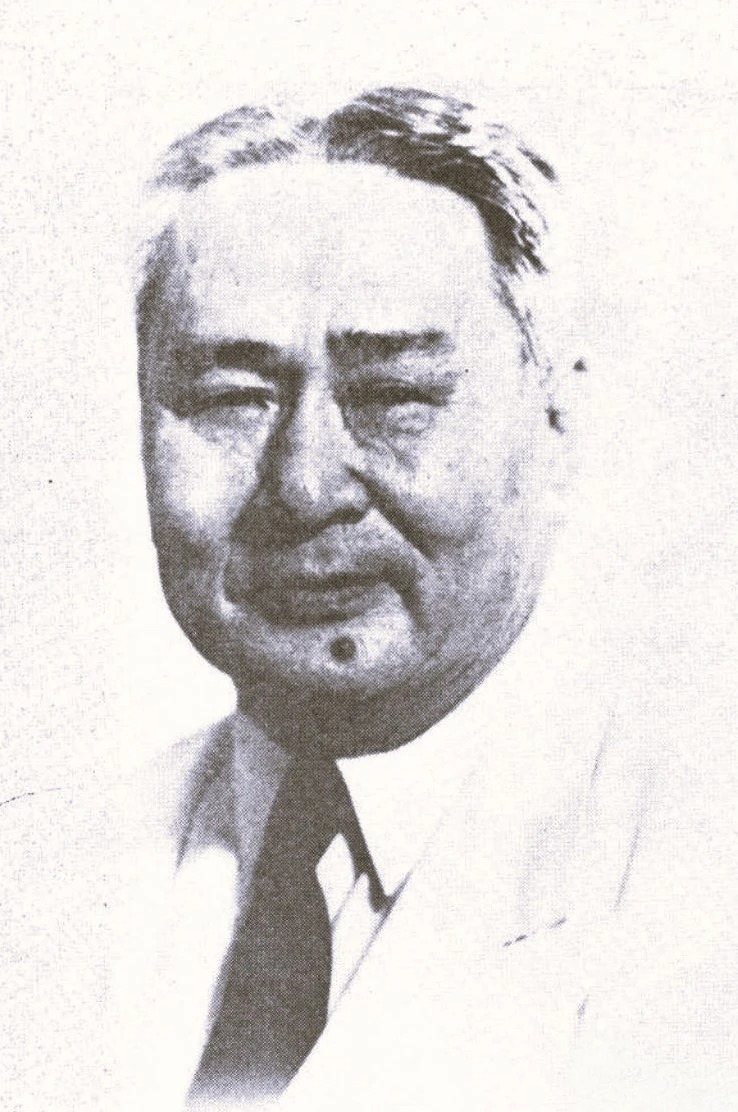

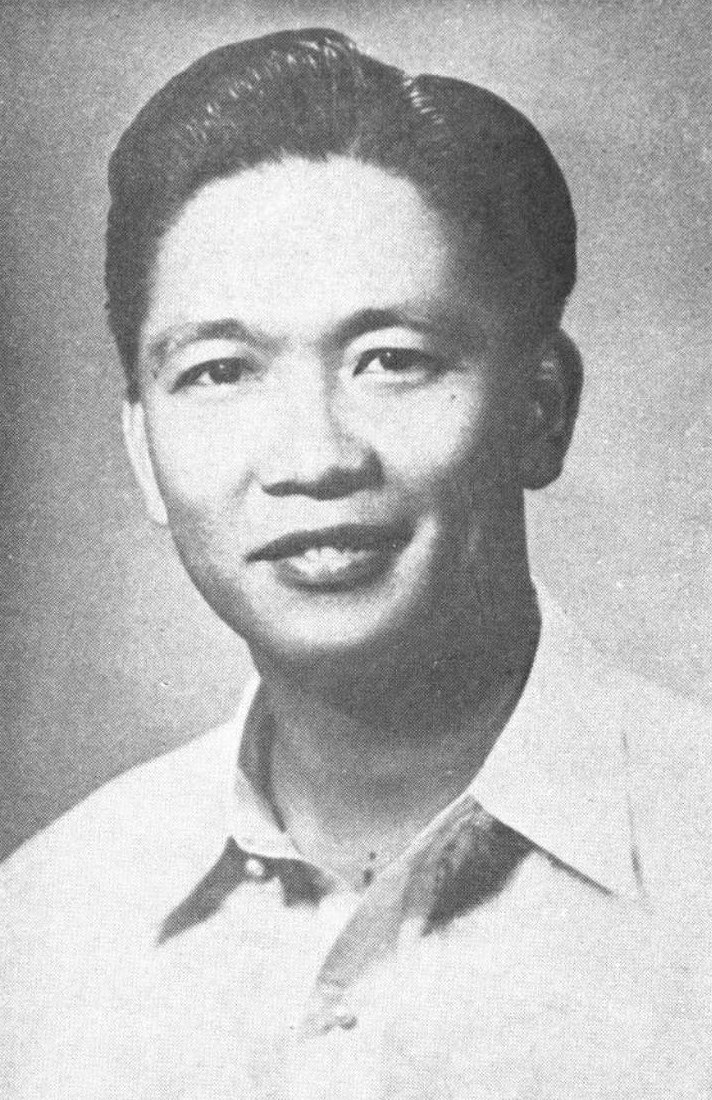
	Majority party	Minority party
Leader	Eulogio Rodriguez	Ferdinand Marcos
Party	Nacionalista	Liberal
Seats before	13 (6 up)	8 (2 up)
Seats won	4	4
Seats after	11	10
Seat change	▼2	▲2
Popular vote	22,983,457	22,794,310
Percentage	50.17	49.76
Swing	▲5.10	▲11.88
Senate President before election
Ferdinand Marcos
Liberal
Elected Senate President
Ferdinand Marcos
Liberal

The 18th election of members to the Senate of the Philippines was held on November 12, 1963. The 1963 elections were known as a midterm election as the date when the elected officials take office falls halfway through President Diosdado Macapagal's four-year term.

The Liberal Party won control of the chamber after having ten seats out of the 24-member Senate, as the 2-member Grand Alliance (the old Progressive Party) were caucusing with them, plus Alejandro Almendras of the Nacionalistas who personally supported Senate President Ferdinand Marcos.

== Electoral system ==
Philippine Senate elections are held via plurality block voting with staggered elections, with the country as an at-large district. The Senate has 24 seats, of which 8 seats are up every 2 years. The eight seats up were last contested in 1957; each voter has eight votes and can vote up to eight names, of which the eight candidates with the most votes winning the election.

== Retiring incumbents ==
1. Oscar Ledesma (Nacionalista), appointed as ambassador to the United States in 1964

== Results ==
The Nacionalista Party and the Liberal Party each won four seats.

Nacionalistas Arturo Tolentino and Gil Puyat, and Liberal Ambrosio Padilla all defended their seats.

Five winners are neophyte senators. These are Juan Liwag, Gerry Roxas and Tecla San Andres Ziga of the Liberal Party, and the Nacionalistas' José W. Diokno and Rodolfo Ganzon.

Incumbent Nacionalista senators Eulogio Balao, Roseller T. Lim and Cipriano Primicias Sr., and Rogelio de la Rosa of the Liberal Party all lost.

	1	2	3	4	5	6	7	8	9	10	11	12	13	14	15	16	17	18	19	20	21	22	23	24
Before election									‡	‡	‡	‡	‡	‡	‡	‡								
Election result	Not up								LP				NP				Not up							
After election									√	*	+	+	*	*	√	√								

Key:

- ‡ Seats up
- + Gained by a party from another party
- √ Held by the incumbent
- * Held by the same party with a new senator
- ^ Vacancy

=== Per candidate ===
Candidate	Party	Votes	%
Gerry Roxas	Liberal Party	3,623,385	46.98
Arturo Tolentino	Nacionalista Party	3,570,619	46.30
Jose W. Diokno	Nacionalista Party	3,422,828	44.38
Ambrosio Padilla	Liberal Party	3,384,064	43.88
Gil Puyat	Nacionalista Party	3,024,995	39.22
Tecla San Andres Ziga	Liberal Party	3,014,686	39.09
Rodolfo Ganzon	Nacionalista Party	2,708,385	35.12
Juan Liwag	Liberal Party	2,704,222	35.07
Roseller T. Lim	Nacionalista Party	2,655,866	34.44
Cesar Climaco	Liberal Party	2,618,152	33.95
Vicente Peralta	Nacionalista Party	2,605,605	33.79
Bartolome Cabangbang	Nacionalista Party	2,572,830	33.36
Manuel Cuenco	Liberal Party	2,495,180	32.35
Eulogio Balao	Liberal Party	2,489,133	32.28
Rogelio de la Rosa	Liberal Party	2,465,488	31.97
Cipriano Primicias Sr.	Nacionalista Party	2,422,334	31.41
Jacobo Gonzales	Independent	29,458	0.38
Ernesto Bernal	Independent	3,663	0.05
Eulogio Jamolin	Independent	1,577	0.02
Total		45,812,470	100.00
Total votes		7,712,019	–
Registered voters/turnout		9,691,121	79.58

=== Per party ===
Party	Votes	%	+/–	Seats				
Party	Votes	%	+/–	Up	Before	Won	After	+/−
Nacionalista Party	22,983,462	50.17	+5.10	6	13	4	11	−2
Liberal Party	22,794,310	49.76	+11.88	2	8	4	10	+2
Independent	34,698	0.08	−0.36	0	0	0	0	0
Progressive Party				0	2	0	2	0
Nationalist Citizens' Party				0	1	0	1	0
Total	45,812,470	100.00	–	8	24	8	24	0
Total votes	7,712,019	–						
Registered voters/turnout	9,691,121	79.58						

Vote share
NP	50.17%
LP	49.76%
Others	0.08%

Senate seats
NP	50.00%
LP	50.00%
Others	0.00%

== Defeated incumbents ==
1. Eulogio Balao (Nacionalista) retired from politics
2. Rogelio de la Rosa (Liberal) appointed as ambassador to Cambodia in 1965
3. Roseller T. Lim (Nacionalista) ran in 1967 and lost, ran as delegate to the Constitutional Convention in 1970 and won
4. Cipriano Primicias Sr. (Nacionalista) retired from politics

== See also ==
- Also done on this day:
  - 1963 Philippine local elections
  - 1963 Philippine House of Representatives special elections (Batangas's 1st and Negros Occidental's 1st districts)
  - 1963 Angeles cityhood plebiscite
  - 1963 Pioduran creation plebiscite
- 5th Congress of the Philippines
