= Geronima Pecson =

Filipino politician (1896–1989)

The Honorable Geronima T. Pecson
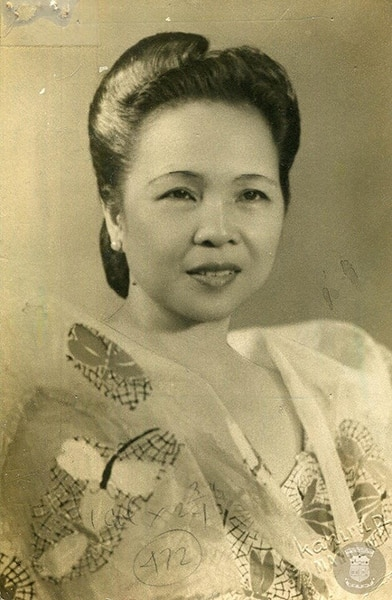

Senator of the Philippines
- In office December 30, 1947 – December 30, 1953

Member of the UNESCO Executive Board
- In office 1947–1954
- In office 1958–1962

Personal details
- Born: Geronima Josefa Palisoc Tomelden; December 19, 1896 Lingayen, Pangasinan, Captaincy General of the Philippines
- Died: July 31, 1989 (aged 92) Manila, Philippines
- Resting place: Basilica of the National Shrine of Our Lady of Mount Carmel Crypt, Quezon City
- Party: Liberal (from 1947)
- Spouse: Potenciano Pecson
- Education: University of the Philippines Manila
- Occupation: Politician
- Profession: Educator social worker

Geronima Josefa Tomelden Pecson (December 19, 1896 – July 31, 1989) was an educator, suffragist, and social worker who became the first woman senator of the Philippines in 1947 and the first woman member of the executive board of the United Nations Educational, Scientific and Cultural Organization (UNESCO) in 1950.

== Early life ==
Pecson was born in Barrio Libsong in Lingayen, Pangasinan as the second child of Victor Tomelden, a census inspector, and Maria Paz Palisoc, a teacher.

She gained her elementary and secondary education from Lingayen's public schools and her college education from the University of the Philippines Manila, where she graduated with degrees in Bachelor of Science and Master of Arts.

She began her career as a classroom teacher at the Manila High School and Ermita Elementary School in 1919. After seven years, she became a teacher and later Principal of the Soler Intermediate School and the Santa Clara Primary School (later known as Gomez Elementary School). In 1934, she began teaching at Far Eastern College (now Far Eastern University), Centro Escolar University and the University of Manila. She eventually joined the faculty of the Zamboanga Normal School (now Western Mindanao State University) when her husband was assigned to teach there.

She married Potenciano Pecson, a teacher and lawyer, who was elected as representative for the First District of Pangasinan from 1928 to 1935 and was later appointed an associate justice of the Court of Appeals in 1953.

Pecson also became active in women's groups. She became involved in social work as co-founder, board member, treasurer, and first vice-president of the National Federation of Women's Clubs of the Philippines (NFWCP) and as a suffragette who advocated for Filipino women's right to vote – which was granted on April 30, 1937, following a special plebiscite.

== Political career ==
Before becoming a senator, Pecson served as the private secretary of President Jose P. Laurel and as Assistant Executive Secretary of President Manuel Roxas. In 1947, she was picked as a candidate by the Liberal Party and won the third spot in the senatorial election.

During Pecson's tenure as a senator, she headed the Senate Committee on Education, the Senate Committee on Health and Public Welfare, and the Joint Congressional Committee on Education. Apart from being a member of Commission on Appointments and of the Senate Electoral Tribunal, Pecson pioneered Philippines laws that included the 1953 Free and Compulsory Education Act, the Vocational Education Act, laws related to establishing training facilities for instructors of arts and trades in certain national schools, and laws that upgraded the School of Forestry of the University of the Philippines and the Philippine Normal School into colleges.

She ran in the 1953 Philippine Senate election for a second term but lost and placed ninth out of twenty candidates. At that time, only eight senators have to be elected.

== Later life and legacy ==
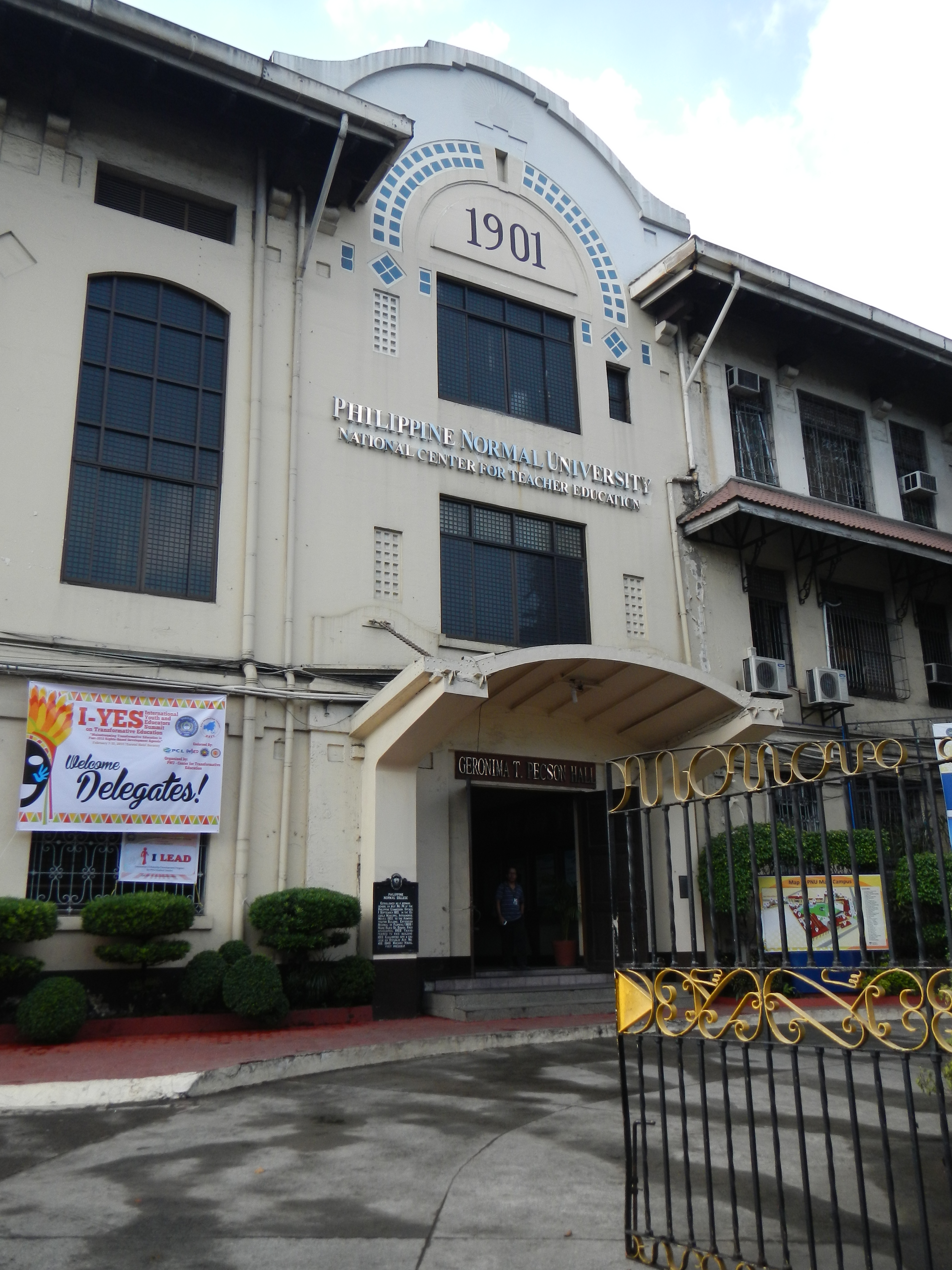
Geronima T. Pecson Hall, the main building of Philippine Normal University Manila

In the 1950s to 1960s, Pecson chaired the UNESCO National Commission of the Philippines and became the first Filipina and woman member of UNESCO's executive board. She also served as chairperson of the Philippine Red Cross.

Pecson was a member of the board of trustees of a number of schools and universities, among which were Centro Escolar University, the Philippine Normal College, and the Philippine College of Commerce (now the University of the East); and a member of the Board of Regents of the University of the Philippines.

She also served as a board member of the Philippines Tuberculosis Society and the Philippine Rural Reconstruction Movement. In her later years, she was a consultant of the Ministry of Education & Culture (now the Department of Education).

In 1996, President Fidel Ramos created a special committee for the commemoration of her centennial birth anniversary.

The main building of the Philippine Normal University in Manila was renamed Geronima T. Pecson Hall in 2005 to honor her.

== Honors and awards ==
=== National honors ===
- : Philippine Legion of Honor, Legionnaire (LLH) – (April 9, 1958)
- Rizal Pro Patria Award (1961)
- Outstanding Award for Excellent Service in Philippine Education (1964)

=== Foreign honor ===
- : Civil Order of Alfonso X, the Wise, Grand Cross (1953)
