= 1947 Philippine Senate election =

10th Philippine senatorial election

- November 11, 1947

8 (of the 24) seats in the Senate of the Philippines 13 seats needed for a majority
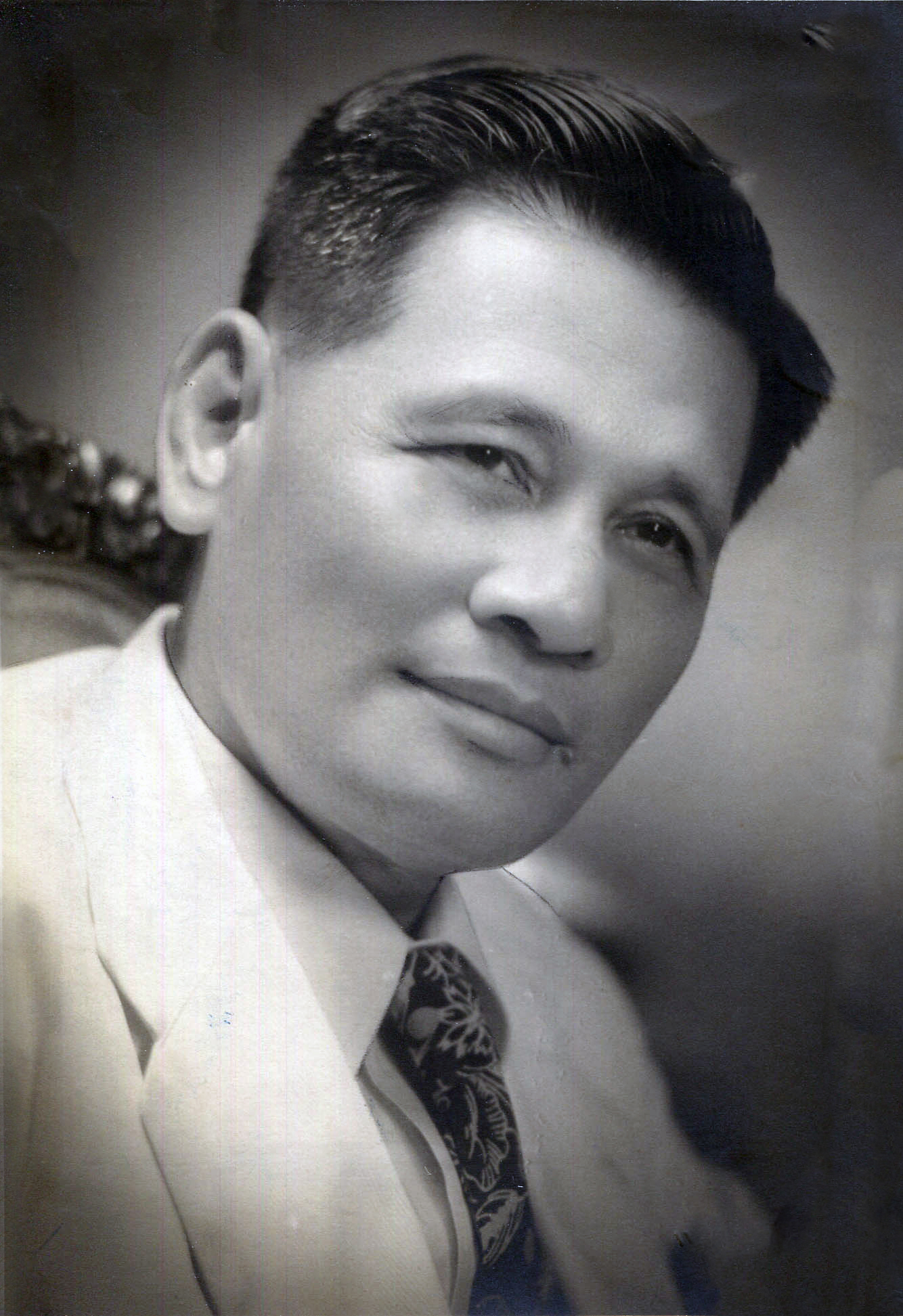

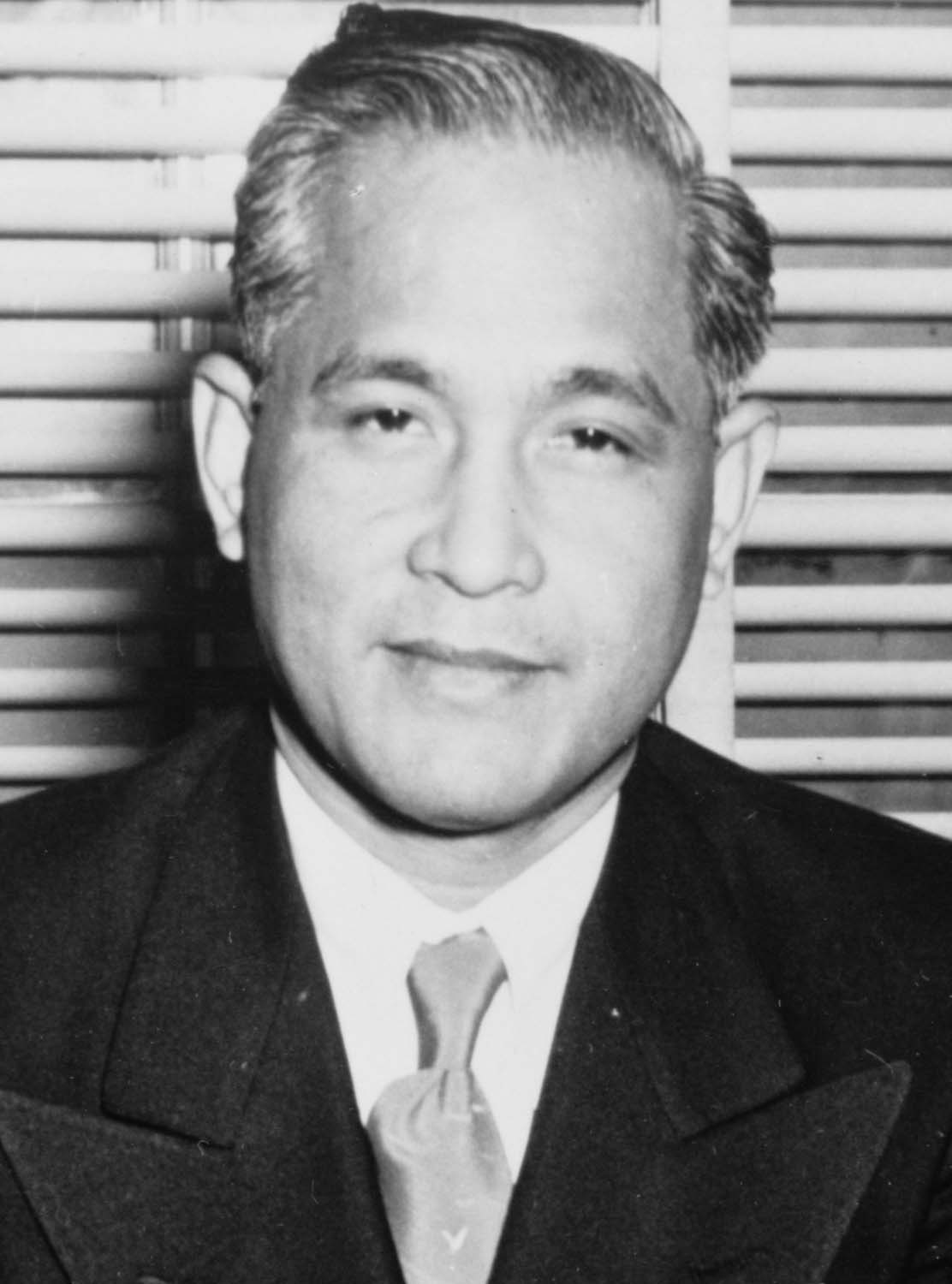
	Majority party	Minority party
Leader	José Avelino	Carlos P. Garcia
Party	Liberal	Nacionalista
Seats before	11 (2 up)	12 (6 up)
Seats won	6	2
Seats after	15	8
Seat change	▲4	▼4
Popular vote	12,288,616	10,114,453
Percentage	54.72	45.04
Swing	▲7.46	▲4.23
Senate President before election
José Avelino
Liberal
Elected Senate President
José Avelino
Liberal

The 10th election of members to the Senate of the Philippines was held on November 11, 1947, with eight of the 24 seats in the Senate being contested. These eight seats were elected regularly; the winners were eligible to serve six-year terms from December 30, 1947, until December 30, 1953. Gubernatorial and local elections were held on the same date.

== Electoral system ==
Philippine Senate elections are held via plurality block voting with staggered elections, with the country as an at-large district. The Senate has 24 seats, of which 8 seats are up every 2 years. The eight seats up were last contested in 1941, or the eight seats not contested in 1946; each voter has eight votes and can vote up to eight names, of which the eight candidates with the most votes winning the election.

== Summary ==
Going into the 1947 election, the Senate consisted of nine Liberals, 14 Nacionalista, and one Popular Front (Vicente Y. Sotto). Of the seats up for election in 1947, all eight seats were held by Nacionalistas.

Senate President Jose Avelino, president of the Liberal Party, scored the opposition and said, "the Nacionalista Party of today is not the party of Quezon and Osmeña ... (it is) the party of Hukbalahaps and other dissident elements." In response, Nacionalista Party President Eulogio Rodriguez appealed for the voters to give the opposition a stronger mandate to fiscalize the administration, which they accused of being corrupt and incompetent.

In the 1st Congress, the Liberals held 14 seats in the Senate, thereby retaining control of the Senate. The Liberals' total was reduced to 13 seats pursuant to the Senate Electoral Tribunal resolution in which Senator Carlos Tan (Liberal) was unseated and replaced by Eulogio Rodriguez (Nacionalista) in 1949.

Geronima Pecson became the first woman to be elected in the Senate.

== Retiring incumbents ==
1. Esteban de la Rama (Nacionalista)
2. Pedro Hernaez (Nacionalista)
3. Vicente Rama (Nacionalista)
4. Proceso Sebastian (Nacionalista)

== Candidates ==
Total seats up: 8
Party	Total
Liberal	8
Nacionalista	8
Modernist	3
Democrat (Osmeña)	1
Goodwill Party	1
Young Philippines	1
Total	22

=== Administration slate === Liberal Party (LP) Jesus Barrera Sotero Cabahug Jose Imperial Emilio Javier Camilo Osías Eulogio Rodriguez Felixberto Serrano Jose Maria Veloso	=== Opposition slate === Nacionalista Party (NP) Pablo Ángeles David Fernando Lopez Primitivo Lovina Vicente Madrigal Geronima Pecson Carlos Tan Lorenzo Tañada Emiliano Tria Tirona	=== Third party slates === Democrat (Osmeña) Rosendo Zaldarriaga Goodwill Party (GP) Melchor Lagasca Modernist Party (MP) Manuel Dikit Hilario Moncado Leonardo Tenebro Young Philippines (YP) Ponciano Abordo

== Results ==
The Liberal Party won seven of the eight seats up; the Nacionalista Party won the other seat.

Two incumbents, all Liberals, defended their seats: Vicente Madrigal and Emiliano Tria Tirona.

There were five neophyte senators, all Liberals: Pablo Ángeles y David, Fernando Lopez, Geronima Pecson, Lorenzo Tañada and Carlos Tan. Nacionalista Camilo Osías returns to the Senate, after last serving in 1929.

Eulogio Rodriguez of the Nacionalistas, was the sole incumbent defeated, but won an electoral protest against Tan and was seated in 1949.

	1	2	3	4	5	6	7	8	9	10	11	12	13	14	15	16	17	18	19	20	21	22	23	24
Before election											‡	‡	‡	‡	‡	‡	‡	‡						
Election result	Not up										LP						NP		Not up					
After election											√	√	+	+	+	+	*	*						

Key:

- ‡ Seats up
- + Gained by a party from another party
- √ Held by the incumbent
- * Held by the same party with a new senator

=== Per candidate ===
Candidate	Party	Votes	%
Lorenzo Tañada	Liberal Party	1,570,390	48.11
Vicente Madrigal	Liberal Party	1,562,825	47.87
Geronima Pecson	Liberal Party	1,559,511	47.77
Emiliano Tria Tirona	Liberal Party	1,552,545	47.56
Fernando Lopez	Liberal Party	1,543,830	47.29
Camilo Osías	Nacionalista Party	1,512,196	46.32
Pablo Ángeles David	Liberal Party	1,489,014	45.61
Carlos Tan (Note: Carlos Tan was later removed from office in favor of Eulogio Rodriguez who won an election protest.)	Liberal Party	1,480,305	45.35
Primitivo Lovina	Liberal Party	1,473,888	45.15
Eulogio Rodriguez	Nacionalista Party	1,346,174	41.24
Felixberto Serrano	Nacionalista Party	1,236,649	37.88
Jose Maria Veloso	Nacionalista Party	1,225,347	37.54
Emilio Javier	Nacionalista Party	1,210,419	37.08
Sotero Cabahug	Nacionalista Party	1,209,598	37.05
Jesus Barrera	Nacionalista Party	1,201,329	36.80
Jose Imperial	Nacionalista Party	1,172,741	35.92
Ponciano Abordo	Young Philippines	13,441	0.41
Hilario Moncado	Modernist Party	11,261	0.34
Manuel Dikit	Modernist Party	10,136	0.31
Rosendo Zaldarriaga	Democrat (Osmeña)	9,010	0.28
Leonardo Tenebro	Modernist Party	7,884	0.24
Melchor Lagasca	Goodwill Party	1,641	0.05
Total		22,400,134	100.00
Total votes		3,264,423	–
Registered voters/turnout		4,233,528	77.11

=== Per party ===
Party	Votes	%	+/–	Seats				
Party	Votes	%	+/–	Up	Before	Won	After	+/−
Liberal Party	12,288,616	54.72	+7.46	2	11	6	15	+4
Nacionalista Party	10,114,453	45.04	+4.23	6	12	2	8	−4
Modernist Party	29,281	0.13	−1.69	0	0	0	0	0
Young Philippines	13,441	0.06	New	0	0	0	0	0
Democrat (Osmeña)	9,010	0.04	−0.01	0	0	0	0	0
Goodwill Party	1,641	0.01	New	0	0	0	0	0
Popular Front				0	1	0	1	0
Total	22,456,442	100.00	–	8	24	8	24	0
Total votes	3,264,423	–						
Registered voters/turnout	4,233,528	77.11						

Vote share
LP	54.72%
NP	45.04%
Others	0.24%

Senate seats
LP	75.00%
NP	25.00%
Others	0.00%

== Defeated incumbents ==
1. Eulogio Rodriguez (Nacionalista) originally lost the election, but won an election protest and was seated in 1949.

== See also ==
- Also held on this day:
  - 1947 Cebu's 6th congressional district special election
  - 1947 Philippine local elections
- Commission on Elections
- 1st Congress of the Philippines
