= List of political families in the Philippines =

This is a list of notable members of political families of the Philippines and their areas of influence. Names in bold indicate the individual was or is a President or Vice President of the Philippines.

The Philippine political arena is mainly arranged and operated by families or alliances of families, rather than being organized around political parties.

== A ==
=== Abad family — Batanes ===
- Jorge Abad – member of the House of Representatives for Batanes (1949–1957, 1961–1964, 1969–1972); secretary of public works, transportation and communications (1964–1965)
  - Aurora Barsana-Abad, wife of Jorge – member of the House of Representatives for Batanes (1965–1969); governor of Batanes (1986–1987)
  - Florencio Abad, son of Jorge – member of the House of Representatives for Batanes (1987–1989, 1995–2004); secretary of agrarian reform (1989–1990); secretary of education (2004–2005); secretary of budget and management (2010–2016)
    - Dina Abad, wife of Florencio – member of the House of Representatives for Batanes (2004–2007, 2010–2017)

=== Abad Santos family — Pampanga ===
- José Abad Santos – acting president of the Philippines (1942); chief justice (1941–1942); associate justice (1936–1941); secretary of justice (1922–1923, 1928–1932, 1938–1941), acting secretary of finance (1941–1942)
  - Pedro Abad Santos – member of the San Fernando municipal council (1910–1912); member of the House of Representatives for Pampanga (1916–1922)
    - Vicente Abad Santos, nephew of José and Pedro – associate justice (1979–1986); member of the Interim Batasang Pambansa from Region III (1978–1984), secretary and minister of justice (1970–1979)
    - Manuel D. Abad Santos, nephew of José and Pedro – mayor of Angeles City (1952–1959)
    - Antonio A. Abad Santos, son of Manuel – mayor of Angeles City (1988–1992)

=== Abalos family — Mandaluyong ===
- Benjamin Abalos Sr. – mayor of Mandaluyong (1986–1987, 1988–1998, 2022–2025), chairman of the Metropolitan Manila Development Authority (2001–2002), chairman of the Commission on Elections (2002–2007)
  - Benjamin "Benhur" Abalos Jr., son of Benjamin Sr. – mayor of Mandaluyong (1998–2004, 2007–2016); member of the House of Representatives for Mandaluyong (2004–2007); chairman of the Metropolitan Manila Development Authority (2021–2022); secretary of the interior and local government (2022–2025)
    - Carmelita "Menchie" Abalos, wife of Benjamin Jr. – mayor (2016–2022, 2025–present) and vice mayor (2022–2025) of Mandaluyong
    - Charisse Abalos-Vargas, daughter of Benjamin Jr. – member of the Mandaluyong city council (2013–2022)
      - David Angelo "Gelo" Vargas, husband of Charisse – mayor of Aliaga, Nueva Ecija (2019–2022); assistant general manager of the Metropolitan Manila Development Authority (2023–present)
    - Benjamin "Benjie" Abalos III, son of Benjamin Jr. – member of the Mandaluyong city council (2022–present)
  - Jonathan Abalos, son of Benjamin Sr. – member of the Mandaluyong city council
    - Jonathan Clement "JC" Abalos II – Assistant Minority Leader of the House of Representatives for 4Ps Party-list (2022–present)
- Arsenio Abalos, brother of Benjamin Sr. – barangay captain of Hagdang Bato Itaas, Mandaluyong; member of the Mandaluyong city council

=== Abaya family — Cavite ===
- Plaridel Abaya – member of the House of Representatives for Cavite (1995–2004)
  - Joseph Emilio Abaya, son of Plaridel – secretary of transportation and communications (2012–2016); member of the House of Representatives for Cavite (2004–2012)
  - Francis Gerald Abaya, son of Plaridel – member of the House of Representatives for Cavite (2013–2022)
  - Paul Plaridel Abaya Jr., son of Plaridel – vice mayor of Kawit (2013–2016)

=== Abubakar family — Sulu Archipelago, ARMM, and Zamboanga City ===
- Ismael Abubakar Jr. – member (1990–1996, 2001–2005) and speaker (1990–1993, 2003) of the ARMM Regional Legislative Assembly; vice governor of Tawi-Tawi (1988–1990)
- Rashdi N. Abubakar — former Mayor of Jolo
- Myra Paz Valderrosa-Abubakar – undersecretary of the Department of Tourism (2021–present); member of the Zamboanga city council (2010–2019)
- Yusuf R. Abubakar – former ambassador of the Philippines to Malaysia and member of the Philippine Constitutional Commission of 1986

=== Abueg family — Cavite, Palawan, Zambales ===
- Catalino P. Abueg - mayor of Rosario, Cavite (1895–1900)
- Moises "Ojing" N. Abueg - nephew of Catalino, treasurer of Subic, Zambales (1899), Katipunero, mayor of Masinloc, Zambales
  - Alfredo M. Abueg Sr. - son of Moises, governor of Palawan (1946–1951, 1955–1959)
    - Alfredo Abueg Jr. - son of Alfredo Sr., mayor of Puerto Princesa, Palawan (1986–1987), representative 2nd district of Palawan (1992–2001)
      - Frederick Abueg - son of Alfredo Jr., representative 2nd district of Palawan (2013–2019)
      - Beng Abueg - daughter of Alfredo Jr., representative 2nd district of Palawan (2019–2022)

=== Acop family — Antipolo ===
- Romeo Acop – member of the House of Representatives for Antipolo's 2nd district (2010–2019; 2022–2025)
  - Resurreccion Acop, wife of Romeo – member of the House of Representatives for Antipolo's 2nd district (2019–2021)
    - Bong Acop, son of Romeo and Resurreccion – member of the House of Representatives for Antipolo's 2nd district (2026–present); city councilor (2013–2022)

=== Acosta family — Bukidnon ===
- Socorro Acosta – member of the House of Representatives for Bukidnon (1987–1998); mayor of Manolo Fortich (1979, 1980–1987, 2001–2007)
  - J. Nereus Acosta, son of Socorro – member of the House of Representatives for Bukidnon (1998–2007); member of the Bukidnon Provincial Board (1995–1998); general manager of the Laguna Lake Development Authority (2011–2016); presidential adviser for environmental protection (2011–2016)
  - Maria Lourdes Acosta-Alba, daughter of Socorro – member of the House of Representatives for Bukidnon (2013–2022)
    - Jose Manuel Alba, husband of Maria Lourdes – member of the House of Representatives for Bukidnon (2022–present)

=== Adiong — Lanao del Sur ===
- Mamintal Adiong Sr. - Governor of Lanao del Sur
- Soraya Bedjora Adiong - Governor of Lanao del Sur, wife
  - Mamintal Adiong Jr. - Governor of Lanao del Sur, son of Soraya

=== Afable family — Zambales ===
- Valentin Afable – member of the House of Representatives for Zambales (1938–1941, 1943–1944, 1945–1946)
- Virgilio Afable – member of the House of Representatives for Zambales (1961–1965)

=== Agarao family — Laguna ===
- Benjamin Agarao Sr. – member of the Lumban municipal council
  - Benjamin Agarao Jr. son of Benjamin Sr. – member of the House of Representatives for Laguna (2004–2007, 2013–2022, 2025–present); member of the Laguna Provincial Board (1992–1995, 2001–2004); national president of the Kabataang Barangay (1984–1985); member of the Santa Cruz municipal council (1975–1980); federation president of the Pagsawitan, Santa Cruz Kabataang Barangay (1975–1985)
    - Joseph Kris Benjamin Agarao, son of Benjamin Jr. – mayor of Santa Cruz (2025–present); member of the Laguna Provincial Board (2010–2019, 2022–2025)
    - Jam Agarao, daughter of Benjamin Jr. – member of the House of Representatives for Laguna (2022–2025); member of the Laguna Provincial Board (2019–2022; 2025–present)
  - Ma. Meg Agarao-Espiritu – member of the Laguna Provincial Board (2018–2024), barangay captain of Pagsawitan, Santa Cruz (2013–present), member of the Pagsawitan, Santa Cruz barangay council (2002–2010)

=== Aguilar family — Las Piñas and Muntinlupa ===
- Dr. Filemon Aguilar Sr. - the patriarch of one of the most prominent political families in the Philippines

- Mayor Las Piñas (1963–1986);
- Congressman House of Representatives for Las Piñas-Muntinlupa (1987–1992)

- Filemon Aguilar Jr. - son of Dr. Filemon Aguilar Sr.

- Councilor Sangguniang Panlungsod Las Piñas
- President of ABC (Association of Barangay Captains) Las Piñas

- Asuncion Aguilar - wife of Filemon Aguilar Jr.

- Barangay Captain BF International Village Las Piñas

- Capt. Albert "Abet" Aguilar - son of Filemon Aguilar Jr.

- Barangay Captain BF International Village
- President of ABC (Association of Barangay Captains) Las Piñas

- Albie Aguilar - son of Capt. Albert "Abet" Aguilar

- Councilor Sangguniang Panlungsod Las Piñas

- Filemon "Peewee" Aguilar III - son of Filemon Aguilar Jr.

- Councilor Sangguniang Panlungsod Las Piñas

- Veronica Aguilar - Nicolas - daughter of Filemon Aguilar Jr.
- Kiko Nicolas - husband of Veronica Aguilar

- Councilor Sangguniang Panlungsod City of Malolos

- Cynthia Aguilar-Villar - daughter of Dr. Filemon Aguilar Sr.

– Congresswoman House of Representatives for Las Piñas-Muntinlupa (2001–2010)
- Senator; Senate of the Philippines (2013–2025)

- Manny Villar- husband of Cynthia Villar (see Villar family of Las Piñas and Muntinlupa)

– Congressman House of Representatives for Las Piñas-Muntinlupa
- Senator; Senate of the Philippines

- Mark Villar - son of Cynthia Villar (see Villar family of Las Piñas and Muntinlupa)

– Congressman House of Representatives lone district of Las Piñas
- Senator; Senate of the Philippines

- Emmeline Aglipay - Villar - wife of Mark Villar

- Congresswoman House of Representatives
- Undersecretary Department of Justice (DOJ)
- Undersecretary at the Department of Social Welfare and Development (DSWD)

- Camille Villar - Genuino - daughter of Cynthia Villar (see Villar family of Las Piñas and Muntinlupa)

- Senator; Senate of the Philippines
– Congresswoman House of Representatives lone district of Las Piñas

- Vergel "Nene" Aguilar - son of Dr. Filemon Aguilar Sr.

- Mayor Las Piñas (1995–2004; 2007–2016)

- Imelda Tobias-Aguilar - wife of Vergel "Nene" Aguilar

- Mayor Las Piñas (2004–2007; 2016–2025)
- Vice-Mayor Las Piñas (2025–present)

- April Aguilar-Nery - daughter of Vergel "Nene" Aguilar

- Vice-Mayor Las Piñas (2019–2025)
- Mayor Las Piñas

- Bong Nery - husband of April Aguilar

- Barangay Captain, Manuyo Dos, Las Piñas

- Alelee Aguilar - Andanar - daughter of Vergel "Nene" Aguilar

- Councilor Sangguniang Panlungsod Las Piñas

- Martin Andanar - husband of Alelee Aguilar

- Secretary Presidential Communications Office

- Christian Aguilar - son of Dr. Filemon Aguilar Sr.

- Carlo Aguilar- son of Christian Aguilar

- Councilor Sangguniang Panlungsod Las Piñas

- Lord Aguilar - son of Christian Aguilar

- Councilor Sangguniang Panlungsod Las Piñas

- Elizabeth Aguilar - Masangkay – daughter of Dr. Filemon Aguilar Sr.

- Barangay Captain, Putatan, Muntinlupa

=== Alawi family — Lanao del Sur and Lanao del Norte ===
- Sultan Dardagan Alawi Macarimbang: Provincial Sheriff of undivided Lanao (Commonwealth); Bureau of Education District Supervisor of undivided Lanao (Commonwealth); Deputy Governor of undivided Lanao (1946–1959); Provincial Board Member of Lanao del Sur (1980–1986); First Maranao to pass the Philippine Civil Service Examination; 5th Sultan of the Royal Sultanate of Madalum; Brother of Sheikh Omar Macarimbang and Hadji Usman Alawi
- Sheikh Omar Alawi Macarimbang: Deputy Governor-at-Large of undivided Lanao (1953–1959); Brother of Sultan Dardagan Macarimbang and Hadji Usman Alawi
- Hadji Usman Macarimbang Alawi: Municipal District President of Madalum; Mayor of Madalum (1955–1968); Brother of Sultan Dardagan Macarimbang and Sheikh Omar Macarimbang
- Arsad "RPK" Alawi Marohombsar: Vice-Governor of Lanao del Sur (2007–2016)
- Kasan Alawi Marohombsar: Vice-Governor of Lanao del Sur (1968–1972); Philippine Ambassador to Egypt (1986–1993); Nephew of Sultan Dardagan Macarimbang, Sheikh Omar Macarimbang, and Hadji Usman Alawi
- Hadji Latip Alawi Macarimbang: Municipal District President of Madalum; Brother of Datu Mangontra Macarimbang; 1st cousin of Sultan Dardagan Macarimbang, Sheikh Omar Macarimbang, and Hadji Usman Alawi
- Datu Mangontra Alawi Macarimbang: Municipal District President of Madalum; Brother of Hadji Latip Macarimbang; 1st cousin of Sultan Dardagan Macarimbang, Sheikh Omar Macarimbang, and Hadji Usman Alawi
- Samad Alawi Tantao: Vice-Mayor of Madalum (2007–2010)
- Abdul-sani Bansao Alawi: Vice-Mayor of Madalum (1986–1988)
- Hadji Ali M. Alawi: Vice-Mayor of Bacolod Grande (1972–19??)
- Magdaga Alawi Langi: Vice-Mayor of Kapatagan (1952–1956)
- Abdulazis Alawi Tantao: Councilor, Madalum (2022–present)
- Faisal Basher Alawi: Councilor, Madalum (2004–2013)
- Datu Gulam Alawi: Councilor, Madalum (1968–19??)
- Macapasir Timblo Alawi: Councilor, Madalum (1964–1968)
- Bashir Macapasir Alawi: Councilor, Madalum (1972–19??)
- Macabebe Alawi: Councilor, Madalum (1988–1992)
- Palawan A. Alawi: Councilor, Madalum (1992–1995)
- Abdul A. Alawi: Councilor, Sapad (1998–2007, 2010–2016)
- Mohammad S. Alawi: Councilor, Balo-i (2025–present)
- Haron M. Alawi: Barangay Chairman of Lumbac, Madalum (2002–2013)

=== Albano family — Isabela ===
- Delfin Albano: representative, Lone District (1957–1965)
  - Delfinito C. Albano - mayor, Ilagan (2001–2006). Son of Delfin
  - Rodolfo Albano Jr. - vice governor (1959–1963); representative, lone district (1969–1972, 1978–1986); deputy minister; representative, 1st district (1987–1998, 2001–2004, 2010–2013); mayor of Cabagan (2013–2016); chairperson, Energy Regulatory Commission. Son of Delfin.
    - Rodolfo Albano III - representative, 1st District (1998–2001, 2004–2010, 2013–2019); vice governor (2010–2013); governor (2019–present). Son of Rodolfo Jr.
    - Mila Albano-Mamauag - mayor, Cabagan (1998–2004). Daughter of Rodolfo Jr.
      - Christopher Mamauag - mayor of Cabagan. Husband of Mila.
    - Antonio Albano; vice governor (2013–2019), representative of the 1st district (2019–present). Son of Rodolfo Jr.
    - Rene T. Albano Jr. - vice mayor, Cabagan (2004–2007). Cousin of Rodolfo III.

=== Alcala family — Quezon ===
- Anacleto Alcala Sr.: governor (1964–1980)
  - Anacleto "Third" Alcala III: grandson of Anacleto, councilor of Lucena (2013–2022), Vice Governor of Quezon (2022–present)
  - Proceso Alcala: nephew of Anacleto, representative, 2nd District (2004–2010), agriculture secretary (2010–2016)
    - Irvin M. Alcala: son of Proceso; representative, 2nd District (2010–2013)
  - Vicente J. Alcala: brother of Proceso; vice governor (2010–2013), congressman, 2nd District (2013–present) and provincial board member (2001–2010)
  - Hermilando Alcala Jr.: brother of Proceso and Vicente; Punong Barangay, Cotta, Lucena
    - Roderick A. Alcala: nephew of Proceso; mayor, Lucena (2012–2022), councilor, Lucena (1998–2001); vice mayor, Lucena (2001–2007 and 2010–2012)
      - Mark Alcala: son of Roderick A. Alcala; mayor, Lucena (2022–present)

=== Alfelor family — Camarines Sur ===
- Felix O. Alfelor Sr.: mayor, Iriga; governor (1972–1975)
  - Felix Alfelor Jr.: son of Felix Sr.; representative, 4th District (2001–2010)
    - Madelaine A. Gazmen: niece of Felix Jr.; provincial board member (2001–2004); mayor, Iriga (2004–2013, 2016–present)
  - Ciriaco Alfelor: son of Felix Sr.; representative, 4th district (1987–1998)
  - Emmanuel R. Alfelor: son of Felix Sr.; mayor, Iriga (1995–2004)
  - Ronald Felix Alfelor – mayor, Iriga (2013–2016)

=== Almario family — Cebu and Davao Oriental ===
- Manuel Zosa: representative, 6th district, Cebu (1949–1972)
  - Thelma Z. Almario: niece of Manuel; mayor, Mati (1967–1977); representative, 2nd district, Davao Oriental (1987–1998); vice governor, Davao Oriental (2001–2004)
    - Jose Mayo Almario: son of Thelma; representative, 2nd district, Davao Oriental (1998–2007, 2016–2022), Vice Governor of Davao Oriental (2007–2016)
      - Cheeno Almario: son of Jose; representative, 2nd district, Davao Oriental (2022–present)

=== Almendras family — Cebu and Davao ===
- Paulo Gonzales Almendras (b. 1893) — Mayor of Danao City, Cebu (1921–1923; 1928–1940);
  - Jovenal Durano Almendras (1915–2000) — Mayor of Danao City (1986–1987)
  - Alejandro "Landring" Durano Almendras Sr. (1919–1995) — Senator (1959–1972), 17th Governor of Davao (1951–1958), 3rd Governor of Davao del Sur (1968–1986), 2nd Davao del Sur 1st District Representative (1992–1995), Davao del Sur Assemblyman (1978–1986)
    - Alejandro Cabahug Almendras Jr. — Davao del Sur Representative (1995–1998) and Provincial Board Member; Candidate for mayor of Digos (2010)
    - Alexis "Dodong" Cabahug Almendras — Mayor of Santa Cruz, Davao del Sur (2016–2019), Vice Mayor of Santa Cruz (2007–2016), and Davao City Councilor (1981–1986; 1992–1998; 2001–2004); candidate for vice mayor of Santa Cruz, Davao del Sur (2022)
      - Aileen Condevillamar Almendras — Vice Governor of Davao del Sur (2016–2019); Candidate for Davao del Sur Vice Governor (2013; 2019)
      - Alvin Rey "Dongkoy" Condevillamar Almendras — Santa Cruz Municipal Councilor (2016–2019; 2022–2025); candidate for councilor of Santa Cruz (2010)
    - Manuel "Manny" Cabahug Almendras
      - Maria Carla "Marla" Poblete Almendras — Davao del Sur 1st District Provincial Board Member (2025–present); candidate for board member (2022)
  - Cecilia Almendras de la Paz — Governor of Davao del Norte (1988)
  - Josefino "Pinong" Durano Almendras — Mayor of Danao City (1952); candidate for Cebu 2nd District Representative (1969)
    - Agnes Almendras Magpale (b. 1942) — Acting Governor of Cebu (2012–2013), 16th Vice Governor of Cebu (2011–2019), Cebu 5th District Provincial Board Member (1992–2001, 2004–2011), and Vice Mayor of Danao (c. 1971)
      - Miguel Antonio "Migs" Almendras Magpale (b. 1978) — Cebu 5th District Provincial Board Member (2010–2019) and Danao City Councilor; candidate for mayor of Danao City (2025)
    - Jose Rene Dimataga Almendras (b. 1960) — Acting Secretary of Foreign Affairs (2016), 8th Cabinet Secretary (2012–2016), and 9th Secretary of Energy (2010–2012)
    - Jerome Almendras — Businessman
      - Jerard "Jed" Gaviola Almendras (b. 1975) — Danao City Councilor (2013–2022; 2025–present); candidate for Cebu 5th District Provincial Board Member (2022)
  - Priscillano Durano Almendras — 4th Vice Governor of Cebu (1963–1967)

Other members

- Alejandro King Almendras — Davao del Sur 1st District Provincial Board Member (2010–2013)
- Wilhemina "Minaking" King Almendras — Candidate for Davao del Sur Representative (2016; 2022)

=== Alonte family — Biñan ===
- Bayani Arthur Alonte – mayor of Biñan (1987–1997)
  - Len Alonte – daughter of Bayani Arthur; councilor (1998–2004), vice mayor (2004–2007), mayor (2007–2016), representative (2016–2025)
  - Gel Alonte – son of Bayani Arthur; councilor (2013–2016), vice mayor (2016–2025), mayor (2025–present)

=== Alonto family — Lanao del Sur and Lanao del Norte ===
- Sultan Alauya Adiong Alonto, senator under the Philippine Commonwealth
  - Ahmad Domocao Alonto, governor, congressman (1953), senator 1958–1961 (son)
  - Sheik Abdul Ghaffur Alonto, governor, 1960–1964, 1964–1967 and Ambassador (son)
  - Princess Tarhata Alonto-Lucman, governor, Lanao del Sur 1970–1974, OIC 1987–1988 (daughter)
    - Sultan Rashid Lucman: husband of Tarhata, congressman
    - Normalah Alonto Lucman: daughter of Tarhata; former vice governor of Lanao del Sur
    - Haroun Al-Rashid Alonto Lucman Jr.: son of Tarhata; former vice governor of Autonomous Region in Muslim Mindanao (ARMM)
  - Adnan Alonto: grandson; Philippine ambassador to Saudi Arabia
  - Akira Alonto: grandson; mayor of Marantao
  - Abul Khayr Alonto, speaker, ARMM (grandson)
  - Ricky Alonto Mamainte, mayor Bayang (great-grandson)
  - Yasser Alonto Balindong, former assemblyman and incumbent representative, 2nd District of Lanao del Sur (great-grandson)
  - Alexander G. Alonto, Jr, 1st District board member, (great-grandson) present
  - Abdulrashid Alonto Balindong, board member Liga ng mga Barangay, Lanao del Sur (great-grandson)
  - Amer Gary Alonto Balindong-II vice mayor and OIC mayor of Malabang (great-grandson)
  - Abdul Mikhail Alonto B Balindong (great-grandson)
  - Mamintal Adiong Sr., congressman and governor, Lanao del Sur (nephew)
    - Mamintal Alonto Adiong Jr.: son of Mamintal Sr.; governor, Lanao del Sur (2019–present)
      - Mohammad Khalid "Mujam" Adiong: son of Mamintal Jr.; vice governor, Lanao del Sur (2019–present)
    - Ziaur-Rahman "Zia" Alonto Adiong: son of Mamintal Sr.; former Deputy Speaker, Regional Legislative Assembly; former member, interim Bangsamoro Parliament; representative, 1st district of Lanao del Sur (2022–present)
    - Ansaruddin Alonto Adiong: son of Mamintal Sr.; assemblyman, vice governor (2008–2009) and acting governor of ARMM; representative, 1st district of Lanao del Sur (2013–2022); mayor, Ditsaan-Ramain (2022–present)
- Datu Birua Alonto, mayor, Marawi, 1938 (brother)
- Pangalian Balindong, 1971 Constitutional Convention Delegate and ARMM assembly speaker, congressman and deputy speaker 2nd District (son-in-law)
- Jamal Alonto, mayor, Bubong (nephew)

=== Alunan family — Negros Occidental ===
- Rafael Rivas Alunan Sr. - Secretary of Finance (1933), Secretary of Agriculture and Commerce (1928–1933), (1941), (1942–1945) and Secretary of the Interior (1938–1941)
- Rafael Moreno Alunan III - Grandson of the former. Secretary of Tourism (1991–1992) Secretary of the Interior (1992–1996)

=== Alvarez family — Davao del Norte and Zamboanga City ===
- Vicente Álvarez – president of the Republic of Zamboanga (1899)
- Pantaleon Alvarez – speaker of the House of Representatives (2016–2018), secretary of Transportation of Communications (2001–2002), representative of Davao del Norte (1998–2001, 2016–present)

=== Amatong family — Zamboanga del Norte and Davao de Oro/Compostela Valley ===
- Jacobo Amatong – city councilor of Dipolog (1971–1984).
- Isagani Amatong – congressman from the Third District of Zamboanga del Norte (2013–2022), governor of Zamboanga del Norte (1986–1995; 1998–2004), and city councilor of Dipolog (1984–1986).
  - Adrian Michael "Ian" Amatong, congressman from the Third District of Zamboanga del Norte (2022–present). Son of Isagani.
- Prospero Amatong – congressman from the Second District of Compostela Valley (1998–2007), governor of Compostela Valley (1998) and Davao del Norte (1988–1998), mayor of Nabunturan (1972–1977; 1980–1986).
  - Rommel Amatong, congressman from the Second District of Compostela Valley (2007–2016). Son of Prospero.
- Ernesto Amatong – congressman from the Second District of Zamboanga del Norte (1987–1995), and delegate to the 1971 Constitutional Convention.
  - Juanita Amatong, secretary of the Department of Finance (2003–2005). Wife of Ernesto.
- Ephyro Luis Amatong – commissioner of Securities and Exchange Commission. Nephew of Jacobo, Isagani, Prospero, and Ernesto.

=== Ampatuan family — Maguindanao del Sur ===
- Andal Ampatuan Sr. – governor of Maguindanao
  - Datu Saudi Ampatuan - mayor of Datu Piang
  - Andal Ampatuan Jr. – mayor of Datu Unsay
  - Zaldy Ampatuan – governor of Autonomous Region in Muslim Mindanao
- Datu Andal "Datu Aguak" S. Ampatuan V – mayor of Datu Unsay
- Marop B. Ampatuan – mayor of Shariff Aguak
- Akmad A. Ampatuan Jr. – mayor of Mamasapano
- Tahirodin Benzar A. Ampatuan – vice mayor of Mamasapano
- Bongbong Ampatuan – mayor of Datu Hoffer Ampatuan

=== Angara family — Quezon/Aurora ===
- Jose Angara: representative, Philippine Legislature (1934–1935); representative, National Assembly (1935–1938)
  - Edgardo Angara: nephew of Jose; senator (1987–1998, 2001–2013), Secretary of Agriculture(1999–2001)
    - Juan Edgardo "Sonny" Angara: son of Edgardo; congressman (2004–2013), senator in the 16th Congress (2013–2025)Secretary of Education (2025-present)
    - Dita Angara-Mathay- Interim Secretary of Tourism (2026-present)
  - Arthur Angara: brother of Edgardo; mayor of Baler (1992–2001, 2004–2013)
    - Karen Angara Ularan: daughter of Arthur; vice mayor of Baler (2013–2016)
  - Bellaflor Angara-Castillo: sister of Edgardo; governor (2004–2013); representative of Lone District (1995–2004, 2013–2019)
  - Joselito J. Angara-Mayor of Baler
    - Rommel Rico Angara: son of Joselito; vice-governor (2013–2019), representative (2019–present)

=== Antiporda family — Binangonan, Rizal ===
- Clemente Antiporda – mayor (1908–1912)
  - Julio Antiporda – mayor (1928–1936)
    - Antonio Antiporda – councilor (1952–1956), vice mayor (1956–1963)
      - Gilderado Doblada Antiporda – councilor (2001–2010)
        - Jerome Ceñidoza Antiporda – councilor (2022–2025)
        - Coco Ceñidoza Antiporda – barangay kagawad from Pilapila (2023–2025), councilor (2025–present)

=== Antonino family — Nueva Ecija, La Union and General Santos ===
- Gaudencio Antonino – senator (1961–1967)
  - Magnolia Antonino – congresswoman of the First district of La Union (1965–1967), senator (1967–1972)
  - Darlene Antonino-Custodio – member of the House of Representatives from South Cotabato's First District (2001–2010), mayor of General Santos (2010–2013)
  - Rodolfo Antonino – member of the House of Representatives from Nueva Ecija's Fourth District (2004–2013)
  - Magnolia Antonino Nadres – member of the House of Representatives from Nueva Ecija's Fourth District (2013–2019)

=== Antonio family — Cagayan ===
- Alvaro Trinidad Antonio – governor (2007–2016), mayor of Alcala (2004–2007)
- Cristina Antonio - mayor of Alcala

=== Aquino family — Agusan del Norte ===
- Jose C. Aquino Sr. – governor 1964–1966, congressman 1967–1969
  - Jose "Joboy" Aquino II – representative (2007–2013; 2022–present), vice mayor of Butuan (2016–2022)

=== Aquino family — Sorsogon ===
- Rafael C. Aquino Sr. – congressman 7th Congress (1969–1972)
  - Rodolfo N. Aquino – board member 1st District
  - Rebecca L. Aquino – board member 1st District

=== Aquino family — Tarlac, Malabon, Makati and Navotas ===
- Servillano Aquino: representative, Samar (Malolos Congress of 1898)
  - Benigno S. Aquino Sr., representative, 2nd district, Tarlac (1916–1928); senator (1934). Son of Servillano.
    - Agapito "Butz" Aquino, senator (1987–1998); representative, 2nd district, Makati (1998–2007). Son of Benigno Sr.
    - Teresa "Tessie" Aquino-Oreta, representative, lone district, Malabon-Navotas (1987–1998); senator (1998–2004). Daughter of Benigno Sr.
      - Antolin "Lenlen" Aquino Oreta III, mayor, Malabon (2012–2022); vice mayor, Malabon (2010–2012); city councilor, Malabon (2007–2010). Son of Tessie.
    - Benigno "Ninoy" S. Aquino Jr., senator (1968–1972). Son of Benigno Sr.
      - **Corazon C. Aquino**, **11th President of the Philippines** (1986–1992). Wife of Benigno Jr.
      - **Benigno Aquino III**, **15th President of the Philippines** (2010–2016); senator (2007–2010); representative, 2nd district, Tarlac (1998–2007). Son of Benigno Jr.
    - Paolo Benigno "Bam" Aguirre Aquino IV, senator (2013–2019, 2025–present).
    - Jesli Aquino Lapus, representative, 3rd district, Tarlac (1998–2007). Cousin of Agapito.
    - Titus A. Valdez, vice mayor, Concepcion, Tarlac (1998–2004). Cousin of Agapito.
  - Herminio S. Aquino, representative, 3rd district, Tarlac (1992–1998); vice governor, Tarlac (1998–2001). Son of Servillano.

=== Arcillas family — Laguna ===
- Leon Arcillas – mayor (1998–2005)
- Arlene Arcillas – mayor (2019–present), (2007–2016), and 1st District of Laguna (2016–2019), vice mayor (2005–2007), councilor (2004–2005)
- Arnold Arcillas – vice mayor (2022–present), (2016–2019)

=== Arroyo family — Camarines Sur, Negros Occidental, Pampanga, and Iloilo ===
- Ignacio Arroyo Jr. – representative, 5th District of Negros Occidental (2004–2012).
- Ma. Lourdes T. Arroyo – representative, 5th District Negros Occidental.
- Jose María Arroyo – representative, 1st District of Iloilo (1916–1919); senator (1919–1927).
  - Jose Miguel Arroyo – Second Gentleman (1998–2001); First Gentleman (2001–2010); grandson of Jose María Arroyo.
    - **Gloria Macapagal Arroyo** – **14th President of the Philippines** (2001–2010); **Vice-President of the Philippines** (1998-2001); representative, 2nd District of Pampanga; wife of Jose Miguel. granddaughter-in-law of Jose María Arroyo; daughter of Diosdado Macapagal (of Macapagal family).
      - Juan Miguel Macapagal Arroyo – representative, Ang Galing Pinoy Partylist and 2nd District of Pampanga (2004–2010). Son of Jose Miguel and Gloria.
      - Diosdado "Dato" Macapagal Arroyo – representative, 2nd and 1st Districts of Camarines Sur (2007–2010); Son of Jose Miguel and Gloria.

=== Arroyo family — Camarines Sur and Makati ===
- Joker Arroyo: senator (2001–2013); representative of Makati; Executive Secretary
- Jack Arroyo: brother of Joker; governor (1950s)
- Precy De Guzman Arzobal - Vice Mayor Balayan Batangas 1995 - 2000, Municipal Councilor 2000- 2009
- Cristopher Edison Arzobal - SK Chairman, Liga ng Kabataan Leader - Province of Batangas, Office of the Mayor Secretary 20010 - 2013

=== Asistio family — Caloocan ===
- Cornelio Roxas Cordero – mayor (1941–1944)
- Macario Asistio, Sr – mayor (1952–1972)
  - Macario "Boy" Asistio Jr. – mayor (1980–1995)
  - Luis "Baby" Asistio – representative, 2nd District (1992–2001, 2004–2007)
    - Macario "Maca" Asistio III – councilor, 2nd District (2004–2013), vice mayor (2013–2022)
  - Aurora Asistio-Henson – representative, 1st District (1992–1997)
    - Onet Asistio-Henson – Punong Barangay (2007–2013), 1st District councilor (2013–present)
- Alejandro Asistio Fider – mayor (1976–1978)
- Delfin M. Asistio - councilor Mandaluyong City (? - ?)
- Albert Asistio-Munoz – presidential advisor
- Dean Asistio – councilor, 1st District (2013–2022), representative, 3rd District (2022–present)
- Keanu Asistio – Barangay Councilor Brgy 175 (2018–present)
- Art Asistio -Barangay Councilor Brgy 178 (2023–present)
- Gut Cordero Asistio - Barangay Councilor Brgy 20 (2023–present)
- Matthew Asistio - Sangguniang Kabataan Chairperson Brgy 71 (2023–present)

=== Atienza family — Manila ===
- Hermenegildo Atienza – mayor (1944–1945)
- Lito Atienza – Buhay Partylist representative (2013–2022), secretary of Environment and Natural Resources (2007–2009), mayor (1998–2007) and Mambabatas Pambansa (1984–1986); nephew of Herminigildo
  - Kim Atienza – councilor, 5th District (1995–2004)
  - Ali Atienza – councilor, 5th District
  - Chi Atienza – vice mayor (2025–present)

== B ==
=== Bagatsing family — Manila and Muntinlupa ===
- Ramon Bagatsing – representative, 3rd District of Manila (1957–1965; 1969–1972) and mayor of Manila (1972–1986)
  - Amado Bagatsing – representative, 5th District of Manila; son
    - Cristal Bagatsing – representative, 5th District of Manila
  - Ramon Bagatsing Jr. – representative, 4th District of Manila (1987–1998); son
    - Ramon Bagatsing – councilor, 4th District of Manila (1998–2004)
    - Don Juan "DJ" Bagatsing – councilor, 4th District of Manila
  - Roberto "Robbie" Bagatsing Oca – councilor, 3rd District of Manila (2009–2010); nephew of Amado and Ramon Jr.
  - Ryan Bagatsing – councilor of Muntinlupa (2001–2010, 2019–present); nephew of Amado and Ramon Jr.

=== Baguilat family — Ifugao ===
- Raymundo Baguilat – mayor of Kiangan (1935–1940), governor (1952–1953), 1971 Constitutional Convention Delegate
- Teddy Baguilat, councilor of Kiangan (1992–1995), mayor of Kiangan (1995–2001), governor (2001–2004; 2007–2010), representative, lone district (2010–2019); grandson of Raymundo

=== Balindong family — Lanao del Sur ===
- Sultan Amer Macaorao Balindong – mayor of Malabang (1953–1971)
- Ali Pangalian M. Balindong – representative, 2nd district (1995–1998; 2007–2016)
  - Yasser Alonto Balindong – representative, 2nd district (2004–2016)
  - Abdul Rashid Alonto Balindong – board member, ABC Federation president (2018–present)
  - Amer Alonto Balindong – mayor of Malabang
- Anwar Biruar M. Balindong – mayor of Malabang
  - Omensalam S. Balindong – mayor of Malabang (2013–2016, 2016–present)
  - Amir Oden S. Balindong – board member, 2nd district (2010–2016)
  - Raizoli S. Balindong – vice mayor of Malabang (2017–present)
  - Elaine S. Balindong – Brgy. chairman of Malabang
  - Arif S. Balindong – Brgy. chairman of Malabang
  - Amir Ali S. Balindong – Brgy. chairman of Malabang
- Alinader Dagar M. Balindong – mayor of Malabang and Picong (20 years in service)
  - Amin Dimaporo Balindong – former mayor of Picong (Sultan Gumander) 2007-2010 and mayor of Malabang, Lanao del Sur (2025–present)
  - Mesron Dimaporo Balindong – mayor of Picong (Sultan Gumander)
  - Yacob Dimaporo Balindong – vice mayor of Picong (Sultan Gumander)
- Lomala Balindong – assemblyman, 2nd district
- Aleem Abdullah Balindong – Board member, 2nd district
- Sonairah Balindong Macandog – Brgy. chairman of Picong
- Abdul Harris Balindong Macacua – Board member, 2nd district
- Nassif Balindong Marohom – councilor, Malabang (2013–present)
- Waled Balindong Marohom – Brgy. chairman, Malabang
- Norodin Balindong Marohom – Brgy. chairman, Malabang
- Rohanna Balindong Marohom – Brgy. chairman, Malabang
- Junairah Cariga Balindong – councilor, Malabang
- Mansawi Bayabao Balindong – councilor, Picong (Sultan Gumander)
- Bobby Balindong Cariga – councilor, Picong (Sultan Gumander)
- Ibrahim Balindong Cariga – councilor, Picong (Sultan Gumander)

=== Balingsat family — Ilocos Sur ===
- Juanito Balingsat – mayor, Galimuyod, 2016–present
  - Jessie Balingsat – son of Juanito; mayor, Galimuyod, 2013–2016
    - Maricel Balingsat – municipal councilor, 2016–present

=== Bangoy family — Davao City ===
- Felix Berenguer de Marquina – Governor General of the Philippines
  - Ysabel Berenguer de Marquina y Sumulong – child of Demetria Linda Sumulong y Lindo; married to Santiago Sauza y delos Rios
    - Restituta Maria Del Carmen Sauza y Berenguer de Marquina – married to Francisco Gabriel Bangoy y Badiang – Cabeza de Barangay of Baclayon (c. 1810s); Cabeza de Barangay of Cateel (c. 1830s)
      - Gabriel Bangoy y Sauza – Cabeza de Barangay of Davao (c. 1853–1883)
        - Antolin Bangoy y Porta – Cabeza de Barangay of Davao (c. 1883–1889)
          - Francisco Bangoy y Bustamante – Cabeza de Barangay of Davao (c. 1889–1898); first elected Filipino board member of Davao (1915–1929); representative, 2nd District of Mindanao and Jolo – 9th Philippine Legislature (1931–1934)
            - Paciano Bangoy y Villanueva – councilor, Davao City (1945–1947; 1954–1955); vice governor of Davao (1959–1965); governor of Davao (1965–1967); governor of Davao Oriental (1967–1968)
          - Cayetano Bangoy y Bustamante – Third board member of Davao (1919–1925); councilor, Davao (1926–1928); Third board member of Davao (1928–1930); governor of Davao (1930–1931); deputy mayor, District of Davao (1944–1945)
            - Benigno S. Bangoy – councilor, Third District of Davao City
              - Renato S. Bangoy – councilor, Third District of Davao City

=== Baraguir family — Maguindanao del Norte ===
- Sanggacala Baraguir – mayor of Sultan Kudarat, governor (1977–1980)
  - Jaymar Baraguir – councilor, Northern Kabuntalan (2019–2021)

=== Barbers family ===
- James Barbers – vice mayor
  - Robert Barbers – congressman, senator
    - Robert Ace Barbers – congressman, governor
    - Robert Dean Barbers – councilor

=== Barzaga family — Dasmariñas, Cavite ===
- Francisco Barzaga – municipal secretary of Dasmariñas (1896-1897); municipal president of Dasmariñas (1900-1901, 1922–1924); municipal treasurer of Dasmariñas (c. 1901); councilor of Dasmariñas (1906-1907).
  - Elpidio Barzaga Sr. - chief of police of Dasmariñas (c. 1934). Son of Francisco and Bernarda Mangubat.
    - Elpidio "Pidi" Barzaga Jr. – mayor of Dasmariñas (1998–2007, 2016–2019); representative of Cavite (2nd district: 2007–2010; 4th district: 2010–2016, 2019–2024). Son of Elpidio Sr. and Magdalena Gelle Frani.
      - Jennifer "Jenny" Austria-Barzaga – mayor of Dasmariñas (2007–2016, 2019–present); representative, 4th district of Cavite (2016–2019). Wife of Elpidio Jr.
        - Francisco "Kiko" Barzaga – councilor of Dasmariñas (2019–2025); representative, 4th district of Cavite (2025–2026). Son of Elpidio Jr. and Jennifer.
        - Elpidio "Third" Barzaga III — vice mayor of Dasmariñas (2025–present). Son of Elpidio Jr. and Jennifer.

=== Belmonte family — Quezon City ===
- Feliciano "Sonny" Belmonte Jr. – speaker of the House of Representatives (2001, 2010–2016), representative of the 4th District (1992–2001, 2010–2019) and mayor (2001–2010)
  - Josefina "Joy" Belmonte-Alimurung – mayor, vice mayor; daughter of Sonny
  - Miguel Belmonte – councilor, 2nd District
  - Christopher "Kit" Belmonte – representative, 6th District; nephew of Sonny
  - Ricardo "RJ" Belmonte – councilor, 1st District; nephew of Sonny
  - Oliver Belmonte – councilor, 1st District
  - Vincent Belmonte – councilor, 4th District; nephew of Sonny
  - Irene Belmonte – councilor, 4th District

=== Bernabe family — Parañaque ===
- Florencio Bernabe Sr. – mayor (1965–1986)
  - Florencio Bernabe Jr. – mayor (2004–2013)
    - Florencio Bernabe III – son of Florencio Jr., councilor (2010–2013), vice mayor (2025–present)

=== Biazon family — Muntinlupa ===
- Rodolfo Biazon: AFP Chief of Staff (1991); senator (1992–1995; 1998–2010); representative, lone district (2010–2016)
  - Rozzano Rufino B. Biazon: son of Rodolfo; mayor of Muntinlupa (2022–present); representative, lone district (2001–2010, 2016–2022); Customs Commissioner

=== Bichara family — Albay ===
- Alfonso Bichara – gubernatorial candidate
  - Al Francis Bichara – member of the House of Representatives from the 2nd District (2007–2016), governor (1995–2004, 2016–2022), member of the House of Representatives from the 3rd District (1992–1995), mayor of Ligao (1986–1992)

=== Binay family — Makati ===
- **Jejomar Binay** – **Vice President of the Philippines** (2010–2016), mayor (1986–1987, 1988–1998, 2001–2010)
  - Elenita Binay – mayor (1998–2001)
  - Maria Lourdes "Nancy" Binay – senator (2013–2025), mayor (2025–present)
  - Mar-Len Abigail "Abby" Binay – mayor (2016–2025), congresswoman of the 2nd District (2007–2016)
    - Luis Jose Angel Campos – congressman of the 2nd District (2019–2025), husband of Abby
  - Jejomar Erwin "Junjun" Binay Jr. – mayor (2010–2015), member of the city council from the 1st district (2001–2010), Sangguniang Kabataan chairman of Barangay San Antonio (1992–2001)

=== Biron family — Iloilo ===
- Ferjenel G. Biron, M.D. – congressman, 4th District (2004–2013, 2019–2022, 2022–present) (Author of Cheaper Meds Law, FDA Law, and ARTA Law)
  - Braeden John Q. Biron, mayor, municipality of Dumangas 2022–present (former congressman 2019–2022, former mayor of Barotac Nuevo 2016–2019)
  - Bryant Paul Q. Biron, mayor of Barotac Nuevo, 2019–2022; 2022–present (former board member 2016–2019)
  - Hernan G. Biron Jr., vice mayor of Barotac Nuevo 2022–present (former board member 2010–2013; former congressman 2013–2016)
  - Hernan D. Biron Sr., mayor, Barotac Nuevo 2007–2010, 2010–2013, 2013–2016; former Vice Mayor 2019–2022

=== Blanco family – Batangas ===
- Arthur "Bart" G. Blanco – board member, 2016–present
- Hamilton G. Blanco – brother of Arthur, councilor, 2010–2019; 2022–present

=== Bondoc family — Pampanga ===
- Emigdio Bondoc – representative, 4th district (1992–1997)
  - Juan Pablo Bondoc – representative, 4th district (1998–2004; 2013–2022)
  - Anna York Bondoc – representative, 4th district (2004–2013; 2022–present)

=== Buencamino family — (San Miguel, Bulacan) ===
- Juan Buencamino – Alcalde
- Felipe Buencamino – Cabinet Member of First Philippine Republic; Member of Malolos Congress
- Francisco D.V. Buencamino – Vice-Mayor, Board Member 3rd District, Bulacan
- Judge Felipe V. Buencamino – Mayor, Board Member 3rd District, Bulacan
- Edmundo "Pop" Buencamino – Mayor

=== Buguina family — (San Mariano, Isabela) ===
- Elmer Buguina – councilor
- Edison Buguina – councilor

=== Buhain family ===
- Cecilia Reyes-Buhain – vice-mayor of Bacoor, Cavite
  - Eric Buhain – congressman

=== Bulut family — Apayao ===
- Elias Kirtug Bulut Sr. – mayor of Calanasan (1981–1992, 2010–2016), governor (2001–2010), congressman of Lone District (1998–2001), congressman of Lone District of Kalinga-Apayao (1992–1995, 1995–1998)
  - Elias "Butzy" Bulut Jr. – son of Elias Sr.; governor (2010–2019, 2022–present), congressman of Lone District (2001–2010, 2019–2022), mayor of Calanasan (1998–2001), vice mayor (1995–1998)
  - Eleanor "Leah" Bulut-Begtang – daughter of Elias Sr.; congressman of Lone District (2010–2019, 2022–present); governor (2019–2022); mayor of Calanasan (2001–2010)
  - Shamir Marrero Bulut – son of Elias Sr.; councilor of Calanasan (2013–2015); vice mayor (2015–2022); mayor of Calanasan (2022–present)
  - Kyle Mariah Chelsea S. Bulut-Cunan – daughter of Governor Elias Jr.; councilor of Calanasan (2019–2022); pcl/ex-officio board member (2019–2022); provincial board member of the 1st District (2022–present)
  - Shirley "Galang" Kirtug-Romero – 1st cousin of Elias Sr.; provincial board member of the 1st District (2013–2019), councilor of Calanasan (2010–2013)

=== Bustos family — Pampanga ===
- Jorge Antonio Bustos – representative of Patrol (2019–2025)
  - Jose Antonio Bustos – mayor of Masantol (2022–2025)

== C ==
=== Calaguio family — Pangasinan ===
- Mauro G. Calaguio – Revenue Director, BIR (1970s) and Commissioner of Finance, Metro Manila Commission (1980s)
- Mauro Alano Calaguio Jr. – son of Mauro Sr., Vice Mayor, Municipality of Sta. Barbara
- Salvador Calaguio - son of Mauro Sr., Barangay Chairperson, White Plains, QC

=== Calo family — Butuan City and Agusan del Norte ===
- Consuelo V. Calo – vice-governor of unified Agusan (1964–1967)
- Marcos Calo – husband of Consuelo, representative, Agusan del Norte (1946–1953)
- Susan Calo-Medina – daughter of Marcos; commissioner, National Commission on Culture and Arts, TV host – Travel Time
- Rodolfo Calo – mayor of Butuan City 1952–1953 (appointed)
- Salvador L. Calo – mayor of Butuan City 1959–1963 and 1963–1967
- Marcos V. Calo – mayor of Butuan City Feb. 1986 – May 1986
- Angelo Calo – vice mayor of Butuan City (1998–2007, 2013–2016)
- Salvador V. Calo Jr. – son of mayor Salvador L. Calo; city councilor (2004–2007), Butuan City
- Canuto Calo – Municipality of Esperanza, Agusan del Norte (1950s)
- Tranquilino Calo Jr. – mayor of Carmen, Agusan del Norte 1968–1969, 1972–1985, 1988–1993
- Ramon M. Calo – mayor of Carmen, Agusan del Norte 1996–2004, 2007–2018, 2021–present
- Jesus Calo – brother of Ramon; mayor of Carmen, Agusan del Norte 2007–2010
- Jovitte Calo – wife of Ramon; mayor 2004–2007, vice mayor (present)
- Carmina Rasha Calo – Daughter of Ramon M Calo, SB Member, Carmen, Agusan del Norte (2025–present)
- Jesus Tranquilino Calo – son of Jesus Calo and Elizabeth Marie Calo, SB Member, Carmen, Agusan del Norte (2025–present)
- Mario Sonny Calo – barangay captain of Sumilihon, Butuan City (1998–present)
- Nieva Calo Famador – vice governor of Agusan del Norte (present)
- John Paul Popoy Calo Famador – city councilor of Cabadbaran Agusan del Norte (2022–present)
- Elizabeth Marie Calo – provincial administrator of Agusan del Norte Province (present)

=== Camacho family ===
- Teodoro Camacho — congressman, governor
  - Jose Isidro Camacho — secretary of energy and of finance

=== Candao family — Maguindanao del Norte ===
- Datu Liwa Candao — first mayor of Parang (1947)
- Datu Zacaria Candao (son of Datu Liwa) — governor of Autonomous Region in Muslim Mindanao (1990–1993) Governor of Maguindanao (1995–2001)
- Datu Marouph Bajunaid Candao (son of Datu Zacaria) — vice governor of Maguindanao (1998–2001)
- Datu Mohammad Candao Panda — vice mayor of Sultan Kudarat (1992–1995)
- Datu Abdul Bayan Candao — founding mayor of Sultan Mastura (2003) vice mayor of Sultan Kudarat (1995–2003)
- Datu Abdul Yasser Candao Sr. (son of Datu Abdul Bayan) — councilor of Sultan Kudarat (2001–2004)
- Dr. Zulficar Panda (nephew of Datu Zacaria) — mayor of Sultan Mastura (2022–present)
- Datu Jukhairy Candao — councilor of Sultan Mastura (2022–present)
- Bai Maleiha Candao (daughter of Datu Zacaria) — member of the Bangsamoro Parliament (2019–present)

=== Cadiao family — Antique ===
- Josue Lacson Cadiao – governor (1955–1963), Commissioner of Civil Service Commission, Commissioner of the Philippine Sugar Commission (PHILSUCOM)
  - Lolita Javier Cadiao – wife of Josue; vice-governor
    - Rhodora Javier Cadiao – daughter of Josue and Lolita; governor; vice-governor
    - Linda Cadiao Palacios – daughter of Josue and Lolita; mayor of Culasi (1998–2001)
- Flaviano Cadiao Mosquera – mayor of Culasi (1967–1980); provincial board member (1992–1998), nephew of Josue
  - Ediviano Lomugdang Mosquera – vice mayor of Culasi (2004–2010); councilor, son of Flaviano
    - April Deevian Bucoy Mosquera – daughter of Ediviano; councilor of Culasi (2010–2013)

=== Cagas family – Davao del Sur and Digos ===
- Douglas Cagas — governor (1988–1992, 2007–2013, 2016–2021), representative, 1st district (1998–2007), member of Regular Batasang Pambansa (1984–1986)
  - Mercedes C. Cagas, wife of Douglas – representative, lone district (2016–2022)
    - Marc Douglas Cagas IV, son of Douglas and Mercedes — governor (2021–2022), vice governor (2019–2021), representative, 1st district (2007–2013)
    - Yvonne Roña Cagas, daughter of Douglas and Mercedes – governor (2022–present)
      - Riafe Cagas Fernandez, cousin of Yvonne – vice governor (2022–present)
- Josef F. Cagas — mayor (2019–present)
- John Tracy F. Cagas — representative, lone district (2022–present)
- Gary R. Cagas – councilor (2019–present)

=== Cailles family — Laguna ===
- Juan Cailles – governor (1901–1910, 1916–1925, 1931–1937); member of Philippine Legislature (1925–1931)
- Isidoro Cailles – mayor of Calamba (1904–1907) (brother of Juan)
  - Isidoro Cailles – councilor of Pakil (1998–2007, 2010–2016); Barangay Captain (youngest son of Juan)
- Ruth Mariano-Hernandez – wife of governor Ramil Hernandez; congresswoman, Second District (2019–present); board member (2016–2019); Calamba city councilor (1998–2007, 2010–2016)
- Gigi Alcasid – Calamba city councilor (2013–present)
- Rolando Cailles – Barangay Captain of Baclaran (2013–2016)
- Rolando Cailles Jr. Barangay Captain of Baclaran (2016–2019)

=== Calalay family — Quezon City ===
- Rey Calalay – congressman, 1st District (1995–2003)
  - Boy Calalay – congressman, 1st District (2013–2016), councilor, 1st District (2004–2013)
    - TJ Calalay – councilor, 1st District (2019–)

=== Calderon family — Angono, Rizal ===
- Gerardo Villamarin Calderon – councilor (1988–1992), vice mayor of Angono (1992–1998; 2019–2025), mayor (1998–2007; 2010–2019; 2025–present)
  - Jeri Esguerra Calderon – councilor (2016–2019), mayor (2019–2025), vice mayor (2025–present)
- Joey Villamarin Calderon – barangay captain of San Isidro (2002–2013; 2023–present), councilor (2007–2013)

=== Calixto family — Pasay ===
- Eduardo Calixto – OIC mayor (1986–1987)
  - Antonino Calixto – representative, Lone District (2019–present), mayor (2010–2019), vice mayor (2001–2010), councilor (1995–2001); son
  - Mark Calixto – vice mayor (2025–present), councilor, 1st District (2016–2025); grandson
  - Joey Calixto-Isidro – councilor, 2nd District (2016–2025); grandson
  - Imelda Calixto-Rubiano – mayor (2019–present), representative, Lone District (2010–2019), councilor, 2nd District (1998–2004, 2007–2010); daughter

=== Carios family — Libmanan Camarines Sur ===
- Wilfredo Curioso Carios Sr. – Brgy. Captain (1960–1972)
  - Fernando 'Ting' Carios – board member 2nd District (1998–2000) Son
  - Wilfredo Carios Jr – ABC President (1998–2000); Son
  - Marissa Carios-Selirio – SK chairwoman; Daughter
  - Wilma Carios – Municipal Councilor (2004–present); Daughter

=== Castelo family — Quezon City ===
- Winston Castelo – councilor, 2nd District (1995–2004, 2019–present), congressman, 2nd District (2010–2019)
- Precious Hipolito-Castelo – congresswoman, 2nd District (2019–2022), councilor, 2nd District (2010–2019)
- Nanette Castelo-Daza – congresswoman, 4th District (2001–2010)
  - Jessica Castelo-Daza – councilor, 4th District (2010–2016)
- Bobby Castelo – councilor, 6th District (2013–present)
- Karl Edgar Castelo – councilor, 5th District (2013–2022)
- Mutya Castelo – councilor, 5th District (2022–present)

=== Castillejos family — Batanes and La Union ===
- Teofilo Castillejos – representative (1909–1912)
  - Juan Castillejos – representative (1916–1919)
  - Claudio Castillejos – representative (1909–1912)
  - Telesforo Castillejos – governor of Batanes (1988–1998, 2007–2010)
- Epifanio Castillejos – mayor of Caba, La Union (1960–1965), congressman 2nd District of La Union (1965–1969), director of Bureau of Commerce (1970–1978), director of Bureau of Domestic Trade (1978–1985) Undersecretary of Trade (1985–1986)
  - Edgar Castillejos – son of Epifanio – mayor of Caba (1980–1986)

=== Cayetano family — Muntinlupa, Pateros, and Taguig ===
- Rene Cayetano – senator (1998–2003)
  - Pia Cayetano – senator (2004–2016; 2019–present), congresswoman 2nd district of Taguig (2016–2019); daughter
  - Alan Peter Cayetano – senator (2007–2017; 2022–present) Senate President (2026), congressman, Pateros-Taguig (1998–2007; 2019–22), vice mayor of Taguig (1995–1998), member of the Taguig Municipal Council from the 2nd district; (1992–1995); son
    - Lani Cayetano – congresswoman 2nd district of Taguig (2019–present), mayor of Taguig (2010–2019), congresswoman, Pateros-Taguig (2007–2010); wife of Alan
  - Rene Carl "Renren" Cayetano – councilor of Muntinlupa; (2001–2007); son
  - Lino Cayetano – mayor of Taguig (2019–2022), congressman 2nd district of Taguig (2013–2016), barangay chairman of Fort Bonifacio (2010–2013); son

=== Celeste family — Pangasinan ===
- Jesus Celeste — mayor of Bolinao (1995–2004), 1st district representative (2010–2019)
- Alfonso Celeste – mayor of Bolinao (2004–2013; 2019–present), vice mayor of Bolinao (2013–2019)
- George Celeste – Bolinao councilor (1998–2007; 2010–2019)
- Arthur Celeste Sr. – 1st district representative (2001–2010; 2022–present), mayor of Alaminos (2013–2019)
  - Arth Bryan Celeste – mayor of Alaminos (2019–present)
  - Arthur Celeste Jr. – Alaminos councilor (2022–present), board member (2022–present)
- Arnold Celeste – mayor of Bolinao (2013–2019), 1st district representative (2019–2022)
- Greg Celeste – Bolinao councilor (2007–2016; 2019–present)
- Richard Celeste – vice mayor of Bolinao (2019–present)

=== Cerilles family — Zamboanga del Sur ===
- Vicente M. Cerilles – representative, Lone District (1969–1972); assemblyman to the Regular Batasang Pambansa (1984–1986)
  - Antonio Cerilles - son of Vicente; governor (2010–2019), congressman of the 2nd district (1987–1998, 2004–2010), Environment and Natural Resources Secretary (1998–2001)
    - Aurora Enerio-Cerilles - wife of Antonio; congresswoman of the 1st district (1998–2001, 2010–2019), governor (2001–2010)
    - Ace William Cerilles - son of Antonio and Aurora; mayor (2007 to present), Dumalinao

=== Chiongbian family — Misamis Occidental, Sarangani and South Cotabato ===
- Don Victoriano Chiongbian – first municipal mayor of Don Mariano Marcos (now Don Victoriano), Misamis Occidental (1982-?)
  - William Lee Chiongbian – son of Don Victoriano; lone district congressman of Misamis Occidental (1953–1962, 1965–1972)
  - James Chiongbian – son of Don Victoriano and brother of William congressman of South Cotabato, first congressman of Sarangani
    - Priscilla Chiongbian – wife of James, first governor of Sarangani
      - Erwin Chiongbian – son of James and Priscilla; congressman of Sarangani (2004–2010)
        - Bridget Chiongbian-Huang – daughter of Erwin; vice governor of Sarangani (2004–2007)
  - Steve Chiongbian Solon – grandson of James and Priscilla; vice-governor of Sarangani (2007–2013), governor of Sarangani (2013–present)

=== Chipeco family — Laguna ===
- Dominador F. Chipeco, Sr – governor (1947–1959)
  - Dominador Chipeco Jr. – vice presidential candidate
- Joaquin Chipeco Sr. – congressman (1961–1965)
  - Joaquin Chipeco Jr. – congressman, Lone district of Calamba (2019–2022), congressman of the Second District (1987–1992, 1995–2004, 2013–2019), mayor, Calamba (2004–2013) and board member (1971–1986)
  - Justin Marc Chipeco – son of Joaquin Jr; congressman of the Second District (2004–2013), mayor of Calamba (2013–2022)
  - Julian Eugene Chipeco – son of Joaquin Jr; Calamba city councilor (2019–2022)
  - Victoriano Chipeco – mayor, Calamba (1987–1998)
  - Rene Chipeco – provincial board member (1987–1992)

=== Climaco family — Zamboanga City ===
- Cesar Climaco – Mambabatas Pambansa (assemblyman) (1984), mayor (1953–1954, 1956–1961, 1980–1984)
  - Julio Cesar Climaco – mayor (1986–1987)
  - Maria Isabelle Climaco Salazar – vice mayor (2004–2007), member of the House of Representatives from the First District (2007–2013), mayor (2013–2022)

=== Co family — Albay ===
- Christopher Co- representative of Ako Bicol Partylist from 2010 to 2019
  - Natasha Co - daughter of Christopher; representative of Barangay Health Wellness Partylist from 2019 to 2025
- Zaldy Co - representative of Ako Bicol Partylist from 2019 to 2025

=== Codilla family — Leyte ===
- Eufrocino Codilla Sr. – mayor of Ormoc (1992–2001), congressman of the 4th District (2001–2010)
  - Eric Codilla – mayor of Ormoc (2004–2013)
  - Edward Codilla – mayor of Ormoc (2013–2016)
  - Elmer Codilla – vice mayor of Kananga (2016–2019), mayor (2007–2016)
    - Rowena Codilla – mayor of Kananga (2016–2019)

=== Cortes family — Mandaue ===
- Zoilo "Olong" Mendoza – Capitan Accidental (1890s)
- Ariston Ceniza Cortes – municipal president (1926–1937)
  - Demetrio Mendoza Cortes – councilor (1957–1960), mayor (1960–1986)
    - Ariston Cortes III – barangay captain
    - Demetrio Cortes Jr. – vice mayor (1987–1998), city councilor
    - Jonas Cortes – city councilor (2001–2007); mayor of Mandaue City (2007–2016, 2019–2024); representative of the 6th district of Cebu (2016–2019)
- Ignacio Cortes – barangay councilor of Centro
- Jericho Cortes – barangay councilor of Alang-Alang,
  - Jeric Mikail Cuison — Sangguniang Kabataan chairman of Alang-Alang, SK Federation president and city councilor

=== Cortes family — Isabela ===
- Rufino "Ruping" Cortes Sr. – Judge
- Raul T. Cortes - Barangay Captain
- Sherwin Cortes-Garcia - Barangay Captain
- Proceso "Ching" Cortes - City Councilor of Cauayan

=== Cojuangco family — Tarlac, Negros Occidental, and Pangasinan ===
- Melecio Cojuangco; representative, 1st Philippine Assembly
- Eduardo Cojuangco Sr.; governor (1941)
  - Eduardo Cojuangco Jr.: governor of Tarlac (1967–1969); representative, 1st district, Tarlac (1969–1972)
    - Carlos Cojuangco: son of Eduardo Jr; representative, 4th district, Negros Occidental (1998–2007)
      - Rosario D. Cojuangco: wife of Carlos; vice mayor, Pontevedra, Negros Occidental (1998–2001)
    - Marcos Cojuangco: son of Eduardo Jr; representative, 5th district, Pangasinan (2001–2007)
  - Enrique "Henry" Cojuangco (representative, 1st District of Tarlac, 2010–2015)
- Jose "Pepe" Cojuangco Sr.; representative, 10th Philippine Assembly; father of Corazon Aquino
  - Jose "Peping" Cojuangco Jr.; presidential adviser on food security; representative, House of Representatives (1961–1969, 1987–1998); president of the Philippine Olympic Committee (2005–2018), brother of Corazon Aquino
    - Margarita "Ting-Ting" Cojuangco; Undersecretary for Interior and Local Government; governor (1992–1998); wife of Jose Jr.
      - Robert "Dodot" Jaworski Jr.; vice mayor, Pasig (2022–present); representative, Pasig (2004–2007); councilor, San Juan (1995–1998); son-in-law of Jose Jr. and Margarita
  - **Corazon Cojuangco-Aquino** – **11th President of the Philippines (1986–1992)**
    - **Benigno Simeon Cojuangco-Aquino III** – 15th **President of the Philippines** (2010–2016); senator (2007–2010); congressman for 2nd District of Tarlac (1998–2007)
- Mercedes Cojuangco-Teodoro – assemblywoman of Tarlac, Interim Batasang Pambansa
  - Gilberto Teodoro Sr. – administrator, Social Security System (1966–1986) and husband of Mercedes
  - Gilbert "Gibo" Teodoro Jr. – congressman, 1st District of Tarlac (1998–2007); Secretary of Department of National Defense (Philippines) (2007–2009); presidential candidate for the 2010 Elections; son of Gilbert Sr. and Mercedes
    - Monica Prieto-Teodoro – congresswoman, 1st District Tarlac; wife of Gilbert
- Miguel Cojuangco Rivilla – mayor of Paniqui, Tarlac

=== Coseteng family ===
- Nikki Coseteng — senator
  - Julian Coseteng — councilor

=== Crisologo family — Ilocos Sur and Quezon City ===
- Marcelino Crisólogo – Governor of Ilocos Sur (1901–1906)
- Floro Crisologo – congressman, 1st District of Ilocos Sur
  - Carmeling Crisologo – governor of Ilocos Sur (1964–1971), wife of Floro
  - Vincent "Bingbong" Crisologo – congressman, 1st District of Quezon City (2004–2013, 2016–2019); councilor, 1st District of Quezon City (1998–2004)
    - Anthony "Onyx" Crisologo – councilor, 1st District of Quezon City (2010–present)
- Luis "Chavit" Crisologo Singson – mayor of Narvacan, Ilocos Sur (2019–2022); councilor of Narvacan (2016–2019); congressman of the 1st district of Ilocos Sur (1987–1992); governor of Ilocos Sur (1972–1986, 1992–2001, 2004–2007, 2020–2013); councilor of Vigan (1963–1971); 1st cousin of Vincent. Nephew of Floro. See also Singson family

=== Cua family — Quirino ===
- Junie Cua – governor (2010–2019) and representative of the Lone District, (1988–1998, 2001–2010, 2019–2022)
  - Maria Angela E. Cua – representative of the lone district (1998–2001)
  - Dakila Carlo Cua – representative, Lone District (2010–2019) and governor (2007–2010, 2022–present), son of Junie and Angela
  - Midy Nacague-Cua – representative, Lone District (2022–present). Wife of Dakila

=== Cuaresma family — Nueva Vizcaya ===
- Benjamin Cuaresma – mayor of Bambang
- Luisa Lloren Cuaresma (wife) - mayor of Bambang (1988–1998), vice governor (1998–2004), governor (2004–2013), congressman for the Lone District (2016–2025)
  - Benjamin Cuaresma III - mayor of Bambang

=== Cuenco family — Cebu ===
- Mariano Cuenco y Albao (1861–1909) — Clerk of Court under the Philippine Insular Government (c. early 1900s); Candidate for Governor of Cebu (c. 1900s).
  - Mariano Jesús Cuenco y Diosómito (1888–1964) — 4th President of the Senate of the Philippines (1949–1951) and Senator (1953-1964; 1946-1951), 4th Secretary of Public Works and Communications under President Quezon (1936–1939), 7th Governor of Cebu (1931–1934), 2nd Cebu 5th District Representative (1912–1928), and 10th (and final) Municipal President of Cebu.
    - Manuel Alesna Cuenco (1907–1970) — 13th Secretary of Health under President Macapagal (1964–1965), Administrator of Overseas Employment Council (1962–1963), and 14th Governor of Cebu (1946–1951).
      - Antonio Veloso Cuenco (1936–2020) — Secretary General of the ASEAN Inter-Parliamentary Assembly (AIPA) (2010–2013), Cebu City South District Representative (1987-1998; 2001-2010).
        - Nancy Roa Cuenco (wife of Antonio, b. 1941) — 2nd Cebu City South District Representative (1998–2001).
        - James Anthony Roa Cuenco (b. 1961) — Cebu City Councilor from the 2nd (South) District (2013–2017; 2019; 2020–2024; 2024–2025) and Chief Legislative Staff Officer to Rep. Antonio Cuenco.
        - Ronald Roa Cuenco — Cebu City Councilor from the 2nd (South) District (1992–2001, 2010–2013), Consultant for Market Affairs to the Cebu City Mayor (2001–2003).
  - Miguel Diosómito Cuenco (1904–1990) — 4th Cebu 5th District Representative (1931–1941).

=== Cuneta family — Pasay and Rizal ===
- Pablo Cuneta Sr. (1910–2000) — 10th Mayor of Pasay City (1951–1967; 1971–1986; 1988–1998), Deputy Governor of Rizal (1947–1949)
  - Cesar "Chet" Gamboa Cuneta — 2019 candidate for Mayor of Pasay.
  - Francis Pancratius "Kiko" Nepomuceno Pangilinan (Son-in-law of Pablo through marriage to Sharon Cuneta, b. 1963) — Senate Majority Leader (2004–2008) and Senator (2001–2013; 2016–2022; 2025–present), Presidential Assistant for Food Security and Agricultural Modernization under President Noynoy Aquino (2014–2015), and Quezon City Councilor from the 4th District (1988–1992).

== D ==
=== Davide family – Cebu ===
- Hilario Gebolingo Davide Jr. (b. 1935) — 20th Chief Justice of the Supreme Court of the Philippines (1998–2005), 124th Associate Justice of the Supreme Court of the Philippines (1994–1998), 17th Permanent Representative of the Philippines to the United Nations (2007–2010), 15th Chairman of the Commission on Elections (1988–1990), Assemblyman for Cebu to the Interim Batasang Pambansa (1978–1984), and Member of the Philippine Constitutional Commission of 1986.
  - Hilario "Junjun" Perez Davide III (b. 1964) — 26th Governor of Cebu (2013–2019), 17th Vice Governor of Cebu (2019–2025), and Cebu City Councilor from the 1st (North) District (2004–2010).

=== Dayanghirang family — Davao Oriental and Davao City ===
- Emilio T. Dayanghirang Jr. – vice governor, Davao Oriental
- Enrico G. Dayanghirang – representative, 1st District, Davao Oriental (1987–1992)
- Antero L. Dayanghirang – mayor of Manay, Davao Oriental
- Rey L. Dayanghirang – mayor, Mabini, Davao de Oro
- Jerome Dayanghirang – councilor, Mati, Davao Oriental
- Nelson L. Dayanghirang Sr. – governor of Davao Oriental (2016–2022, 2025–present), representative, 1st District, Davao Oriental (2007–2016, 2022–2025)
- Nelson Dayanghirang Jr. - representative, 1st District, Davao Oriental (2025–present), vice governor of Davao Oriental (2022–2025), board member (2019–2022)
- Danilo Dayanghirang – councilor, Davao; chairman of Philippine Councilor's League

=== Daza family — Samar ===
- Eugenio Daza - member of the Philippine Assembly
- Raul Daza - congressman, 1st District, Northern Samar (1969–1972, 1987–1998, 2010–2013, 2016–2019) and governor of Northern Samar (2001–2010)
- Paul Daza - congressman, 1st District, Northern Samar (2007–2010, 2019–2025) and governor of Northern Samar (2010–2013)
- Niko Raul Daza - congressman, 1st District, Northern Samar (2025–present)

=== Defensor family — Iloilo and Quezon City ===
- Matias Defensor – vice mayor of Quezon City (1946–1948)
  - Matias Defensor Jr. – representative, 3rd District of Quezon City (2004–2010)
    - Michael "Mike" Defensor – Secretary of Environment and Natural Resources (2004–2006) and representative, 3rd District of Quezon City (1995–2001) and Anakalusugan Partylist (2019–2022)
    - Maria Theresa Defensor-Asuncion – representative, 3rd District of Quezon City (2001–2004)
- Arthur Defensor Sr. – governor of Iloilo (2010–2019), representative of the 3rd District (2001–2010) and Mambabatas Pambansa (1984–1986)
  - Arthur Defensor Jr. – governor of Iloilo, representative, 3rd District of Iloilo (2010–2019)
- Miriam Defensor-Santiago – Senator (1995–2001, 2004–2016), Secretary of Agrarian Reform (1989–1990), Immigration Commissioner (1988–1989) and Judge-elect of the International Criminal Court
  - Narciso Defensor Santiago III - son of Miriam Defensor-Santiago; representative of Alliance for Rural Concerns party-list (2007–2010)
- Benjamin Defensor Jr. - brother of Miriam Defensor-Santiago; Chief of Staff, Armed Forces of the Philippines (2002) and Commanding General, Philippine Air Force (2000–2002)

=== Degamo family — Negros Oriental ===
- Roel Degamo - Governor of Negros Oriental (2011-June 2022, June 2022–2023). Vice governor (2010–2011), municipal councilor of Siaton (1998–2007).
- Janice Degamo - mayor of Pamplona, Negros Oriental (2022–present). Wife of Roel
  - Carlo Degamo - board member. Adopted son
  - Nyrth Christian Degamo - board member. Nephew

=== De Venecia family — Pangasinan ===
- Guillermo de Venecia – mayor (1916–1918, 1925–1926)
  - Jose de Venecia Jr. – member of the House of Representatives from the 2nd District (1969–1972), member of the House of Representatives from the 4th District (1987–1998, 2001–2010), Speaker of the House of Representatives (1992–1998, 2001–2008)
  - Gina de Venecia – member of the House of Representatives from the 4th District (2010–2016)
  - Christopher de Venecia – member of the House of Representatives from the 4th District (2016–present)

=== Del Mar family — Cebu ===
The Del Mar family is one of the oldest political clans in Cebu, originating from the town of Parian before its eventual incorporation into the Municipality of Cebu (the future Cebu City) under American rule. The family, through the late Rep. Raul del Mar and his children, have continuously held Cebu City's 1st congressional district since the seat's creation in 1987.

- Juan del Mar, born Juan Bruno (late 1700's–1800's) — Businessman and progenitor of the Del Mar clan. He adopted the surname Del Mar following the 1849 decree of colonial Governor-General Narciso Clavería y Zaldúa.
  - Fabian del Mar y de los Santos (c. 1803–1866) — Businessman
    - Sebastian del Mar y Sarmiento
      - Mariano Castro del Mar — Census enumerator of Dalaguete, Cebu
        - Jose Maria "Joe" Lasala del Mar (1896–1982) — Executive Secretary to Governor Buenaventura Rodriguez (1937–1940), Chief of the Bureau of Labor of Cebu (1921–1927), and Cebu Municipal Councilor (1919–1921); Candidate for Cebu 4th District Representative (1928)
          - Raul Veloso del Mar (1941–2020) —Lawyer, Deputy Speaker of the House of Representatives (2004–2010), 1st Cebu City 1st District Representative (1987–1998; 2001–2010; 2013–2020)
            - Raoul Borromeo del Mar (b. 1965) — 2nd Cebu 1st District Representative (1998–2001)
            - Rachel "Cutie" Borromeo del Mar (b. 1966) — 3rd Cebu 1st District Representative (2010–2013; 2022–present), board member of the Cultural Center of the Philippines and Movie and Television Review and Classification Board (2007–2009)
      - Feliciana del Mar Florido
        - Mariano del Mar Florido (1905–1993) — Judge and 1984 candidate for the Regular Batasang Pambansa
    - Francisco Fausto del Mar y Sarmiento (d. 1889)— Cabeza de barangay in Parian, Cebu and businessman
      - Isaac Ruiz del Mar — Cabeza de Barangay in Parian (1892)
      - Sergio Ruiz del Mar (1874–1961) — Clerk of the Court of First Instance
        - Manuel Bascon del Mar (1917–1955) — Lawyer
          - Antonio Cui del Mar — Executive Assistant to Cebu City Mayor Mike Rama
          - Lilia Augusto — High-ranking employee at the Bangko Sentral ng Pilipinas
        - Simeona del Mar Rogado
          - Manuel del Mar Rogado — Barangay Captain of Mantuyong, Mandaue City
        - Isidro Bascon del Mar
          - Unnamed daughter of Isidro
            - Charles "Caloy" del Mar Pepito — Barangay Councilor and former SK Chairperson of Tinago, Cebu City
      - Catalina Ruiz del Mar-Gacrama
        - Alejandro "Andoy" del Mar Gacrama — Danao Municipal Councilor (1930s), athlete, and journalist
    - Jacinto del Mar y Sarmiento
      - Roque Rosales del Mar (c. 1851–1913) — Gobernadorcillo of Parian, Teniente Segundo 1895 (third highest position in the future Cebu City during the Spanish era), Regidor (councilor) in charge of Cebu District No. 2, Gobernacillo de Gremio de Mestizo (Head of the Guild or group of Mestizos)
        - Filomeno Fuentes del Mar — Cebu Municipal Councilor (elected 1916)
        - Unnamed son of Roque
          - Carmelino del Mar Sr.
            - Carmelino "Jun" Cortes del Mar Jr. (1956–2021) — Mandaue City Councilor (2019–2021), Barangay Captain (2010–2019) and Barangay Councilor (until 2010) of Ibabao-Estancia, Mandaue City
              - Jennifer S. del Mar — Mandaue City Councilor (2022–Present)
      - Santos Rosales del Mar — Government official (Principalía) of Parian before incorporation into the Municipality of Cebu
        - Graciano Pono del Mar — Cebu Municipal Councilor (1919)
          - Ines del Mar-Gajudo
            - Frank del Mar Gajudo — Barangay Captain of Mabolo, Cebu City (2019–2023)
        - Magdaleno Pono del Mar — Justice of the peace
          - Caridad Duterte del Mar-Lopez
            - Mario del Mar Lopez
              - Michael Acebedo Lopez — National Youth Commissioner, MTRCB Board Member, Cebu Port Authority Commissioner
        - Pedro Pono del Mar (1878–1940s)
          - Petra del Mar Pernia
            - Ernesto del Mar Pernia (b. 1943)— 14th Secretary of Socioeconomic Planning and NEDA Director-General (2016–2020)
          - (Either German Neri or Rosario Lumanarias Neri)
            - Romulo Lumanarias Neri (b. 1950) — 8th Secretary of Budget and Management (2005–2006), 11th Secretary of Socioeconomic Planning and NEDA Director-General (2002–2005; 2006–2007), 3rd Chairperson of the Social Security System (SSS) (2008–2010), 7th Chairperson of the Commission on Higher Education (CHED) (2007–2008), Director-General of the Congressional Budget and Planning Office of the House of Representatives (1990–2002)
      - Baldomera Rosales del Mar (d. 1935)
        - Segundo Suico Singson (husband of Baldomera, 1845–1911) — 2nd Vice Governor of Cebu
      - Juliana del Mar-Sandalo — Matriarch of the Del Mars' Dalaguete branch
        - Godofreda del Mar-Sandalo Legaspi
          - Guillermo Sandalo Legaspi (1919–1991) — Lawyer and Mayor of Dalaguete, Cebu
        - Ursula del Mar Sandalo (1888–1959)
          - Filemon Osorio Salvador (husband of Ursula, 1890–1934) — Mayor of Dalaguete, Cebu (1922–1928), Chairman of the Dalaguete Committee of Appointments (until 1934)
          - Francisco Sandalo Salvador (1911–1978) — Lawyer, engineer, and Mayor of Dalaguete, Cebu
          - Celedonio Sandalo Salvador (1913–1979) — Judge
          - Manuel Sandalo Salvador (1925–1996) — Coadjutor Archbishop of Cebu (1973–1996)
        - Ambrosia del Mar Sandalo
          - Amando A. Amazona Sr. (husband of Ambrosia) — Dalaguete Municipal Councilor
          - Amando Osorio Amazona Jr. (son of Ambrosia and Amando Sr.) — Cebu Provincial Board Member-at-large (1980s) and Vice Mayor of Dalaguete

Other relatives

- Magdaleno B. del Mar – Barangay Captain and Councilor (until 2022) of Tuyan, Naga
- Ron Requiroso del Mar — Doctor; Candidate for Cebu 1st District Representative (2019) and Provincial Board Member (2022)
- Venci Requiroso del Mar (b. 1965) — Naga City Councilor (until 2016); Candidate for Mayor (2016, 2022), Vice Mayor (2019), and City Councilor (2025) of Naga and Barangay Councilor of Tuyan, Naga (2023)

=== Del Rosario family — Makati ===
- Albert del Rosario – 25th Secretary of Foreign Affairs (2011–2016), Ambassador of the Philippines to the United States (2001–2006)
- Monsour del Rosario – nephew of Albert; representative from Makati's 1st congressional district (2016–2019), member of the Sangguniang Panlungsod of Makati (2010–2016)

=== Diaz family — San Mateo, Rizal ===
- Jose "Peping" Diaz – mayor
  - Jose Rafael Diaz – son of Peping; mayor and vice mayor
    - Cristina Diaz – vice mayor and mayor
    - Cullen Diaz – son of Jose Rafael and Cristina; SK federation president (2008)
    - Denzel Diaz – son of Jose Rafael and Cristina; SK federation president (2010) and barangay councilor of Ampid
  - Joel Diaz – Barangay councilor and chairman of Santa Ana, Liga ng mga Barangay president (2010–2016) and councilor

=== Dimacuha family — Batangas City ===
- Eduardo "Eddie" Dimacuha - mayor (1988–1998; 2001–2010; 2013–2016)
  - Vilma Dimacuha, wife of Eddie - mayor (2010–2013)
    - Angelito "Dondon" Dimacuha, son of Eddie and Vilma; mayor (1998–2001), Sangguniang Kabataan Federation president and former Association of Barangay Captains president
    - Beverley Rose Dimacuha-Mariño, daughter of Eddie and Vilma; mayor (2016–2025); representative of 5th district (2025–present)
- Nestor "Boy" Dimacuha, nephew; councilor (2016–2025)
- Aileen Grace Dimacuha, niece; councilor (2025–present)

=== Dimaporo family — Lanao del Norte and Lanao del Sur ===
- Mohammad Ali Dimaporo – governor of Lanao del Norte (1960–1965) and Lanao del Sur (1976–1986) and congressman of Lanao (1949–1953, 1957), Lanao del Norte (1965–1972) and Lanao del Sur (1987–1995)
  - Abdullah "Bobby" Dimakuta Dimaporo - governor (1992–1998) and congressman of Lanao del Norte (1984–1986, 1987–1989, 2001–2010, 2013–2022). Son of Ali.
    - Imelda "Angging" Quibranza--Dimaporo - governor of Lanao del Norte (1998–2007, 2016–present) and congresswoman of Lanao del Norte (2010–2016). Wife of Bobby.
    - Fatima Aliah Quibranza Dimaporo - congresswoman (2010–2013). Daughter of Bobby and Imelda.
    - Mohammad Khalid Quibranza Dimaporo - governor of Lanao del Norte (2007–2016); representative of Lanao del Norte's 1st district (2016–present). Son of Bobby and Imelda.
    - Sittie Aminah Quibranza Dimaporo - congresswoman (2022–present). Daughter of Bobby and Imelda.
  - Datu Hattah Dimakuta Dimaporo - regional vice-governor of ARMM candidate (2005). Son of Ali.
- Macacuna Dimaporo - speaker pro tempore of the Batasang Pambansa (1984–1986). Brother of Ali.
  - Raida Dimaporo-Papandayan - mayor of Tubaran. Daughter of Macacuna.
    - Mauyag Papandayan Jr. - congressman of 2nd District of Lanao del Sur (2016–2019). Son-in-law of Macacuna, husband of Raida.
    - Yassin Dimaporo Papandayan - mayor of Tuburan. Son of Raida and Mauyag.
- Naga Dimaporo, mayor of Sultan Naga Dimaporo
- Motalib Dimaporo – mayor of Sultan Naga Dimaporo

=== Diokno family — Batangas and Manila ===
- Ananías Diokno (1860–1922) – Revolutionary Army general during the Philippine Revolution and the Philippine–American War
  - Ramon Diokno (1886–1954) – son of Ananías; senator (1946–1949), representative from Batangas's 1st district (1916–1919, 1934–1935)
    - Jose "Pepe" Diokno (1922–1967) – son of Ramon; senator (1963–1972), Secretary of Justice (1961–1962), Chairman of the Presidential Committee on Human Rights (1986–1987)
      - Maria Serena "Maris" Diokno (1954–) – daughter of Pepe; chairperson of the National Historical Commission of the Philippines (2011–2016)
      - Jose Manuel "Chel" Diokno (1961–) – Congressional Representative (for Akbayan Partylist). Son of Pepe; previously ran in the 2019 and 2022 Philippine Senate elections

=== Domagoso family ===
- Isko Moreno - mayor of Manila (2019–2022), 2025–present; Vice Mayor of Manila (2007–2016); Councilor of Manila's 1st District (1998–2007)
  - Joaquin Domagoso - councilor (2025–present)

=== Dominguez family — Mountain Province and Baguio ===
- Pedro Dominguez, governor of Mountain Province 1920s
- Victor Dominguez, congressman of Mountain Province (1987–1998, 2004–2008)
  - Josephine Dominguez, (Undersecretary; congresswoman of Mountain Province 1998–2001; wife of Victor)
- Benjamin Dominguez, vice governor of Mountain Province
- Elaine Dominguez Sembrano, City councilor of Baguio 2007–2010

=== Dominguez family — Cavite ===
- Barangay Councilor Alejandro Dominguez, Poblacion 1B, Imus, Cavite 1994–1997; 2010–2013
- Barangay Councilor Rebecca Dominguez Garcia, Poblacion 1B, Imus, Cavite 1997–2002
- Barangay Secretary Maria Fe Madia Dominguez, Poblacion 1B, Imus, Cavite 2002–2005
- Barangay Councilor Napoleon Dominguez, Tanzang Luma I, Imus, Cavite 2007–2018
- Barangay Councilor Alexander Dominguez, Tanzang Luma I, Imus, Cavite 2007–2018
- Barangay Councilor Aldrie Madia Dominguez, Poblacion 1B, Imus, Cavite 2013–present; Sangguniang Kabataan chairman 2010–2013
- Barangay Captain Luisito Dominguez, Palico III, Imus, Cavite 2002–2013 and 2018–present
- Barangay Captain Gerry Dominguez, Palico IV, Imus, Cavite 2007–2018; barangay councilor 2018–present
- Barangay Captain Marlone Dominguez, Palico IV, Imus, Cavite 2018–present
- Barangay Captain Roberto Dominguez, Medicion 1-C, Imus, Cavite 2010–2013; 2018–present
- Barangay Captain Eduardo Dominguez, Poblacion 1B, Imus, Cavite 2013–2023
- Barangay Captain Maria Elena Dominguez, Palico III, Imus, Cavite 2013–2018
- Barangay Councilor Roland Ace Dominguez Salas, Poblacion 1B, Imus, Cavite 2002–2013
- Barangay Captain Kristel Dominguez, Poblacion 1B, Imus, Cavite 2023–present; Barangay Councilor 2013–2023
- Barangay Councilor Joel Dominguez, Tanzang Luma I, Imus, Cavite 2013–2018
- Barangay Treasurer Katrina Jelo Dominguez Solis, Poblacion 1B, Imus, Cavite 2013–2017
- Barangay Captain Roberto Dominguez Dones, Tanzang Luma I, Imus, Cavite 2007–2018
- Barangay Captain Reynante Dominguez Dones, Tanzang Luma I, Imus, Cavite 2018–present

=== Duavit family — Rizal ===
- Gilberto Duavit Sr. – senior deputy minister of Youth and Sports Development (1974–1978), member of Parliament for Region IV-A (Rizal) (1978–1984), representative from the 1st District (1994–2001)
  - Michael John "Jack" Duavit – son of Gilberto; representative from the 1st District (2001–2010, 2016–present)
  - Joel Roy Duavit – son of Gilberto; representative from the 1st District (2010–2016)

=== Dumlao family of Nueva Vizcaya ===
- Cesario Dumlao (vice mayor of Bagabag, 1940; mayor of Bagabag, 1945–1946)
- Patricio Dumlao Sr. (mayor of Bayombong, 1950–1951, 1952–1955, 1956–1959); (governor)
- Natalia Dumlao (vice governor, governor)
- Patricio Dumlao Jr. (provincial board member)
- Maybelle Blossom Aquino Dumlao (municipal councilor of Solano, 2001–2004; provincial board member, 2004–2013)

=== Duterte family — Cebu, Davao City, Davao Province, and Surigao del Norte ===
- Vicente Duterte: Mayor, Danao, Cebu; Secretary of General Services (1965-1968); Governor, Davao (1959–1965)
  - **Rodrigo Duterte** – **16th President of the Republic of the Philippines** (2016–2022); Congress Representative, 1st district, Davao City (1998–2001); City Mayor, Davao City (1988–1998, 2001–2010, 2013–2016); Vice Mayor, Davao City (1986–1987, 2010–2013)
    - Paolo Zimmerman Duterte – member of the House of Representatives from Davao City's First District (2019–present); Vice Mayor of Davao City (2013–2018)
      - January Duterte – wife of Paolo; councilor, Davao City (2013–2018); barangay chair, Catalunan Pequeno, Davao City
      - Omar Vincent Sangkola Duterte – son of Paolo; member of the House of Representatives Davao City's Second District (2025–present); barangay captain, Buhangin Proper, Davao City (2023–2025)
      - Rodrigo Sangkola Duterte II – son of Paolo; councilor, Davao City (2025–present); Vice Mayor, Davao City (2025–present)
    - **Sara Zimmerman Duterte-Carpio** – **Vice President of the Philippines** (2022–present); Secretary of Philippine Education (2022-2024); Mayor, Davao City (2010–2013, 2016–2022)
    - Sebastian Zimmerman Duterte – City Mayor, Davao City (2022–present); Vice Mayor, Davao City (2019–2022)
  - Benjamin Duterte – brother of Rodrigo, city councilor of Davao City (1998–2001)
- Franco Dean Duterte Jr. – OIC mayor, Tubod, Surigao del Norte (April–August 1986)
- Ronald Duterte – City Mayor of Cebu City from 1983 to 1986
- Andrei "Red" Duterte - Provincial Board Member for the Fifth District of Cebu. (2019-present)
- Harold Duterte – member of the House of Representatives from PPP Partylist (2025–present)

=== Dy family — Isabela ===
- Faustino Dy Sr. – governor (1972–1986, 1988–1992)
  - Benjamin Dy – governor (1992–2001), mayor of Cauayan (1988–1992, 2010-2013)
  - Bernard Faustino Dy – mayor of Cauayan (2013–2022), ambassador to Switzerland (2022–present)
  - Benjamin Isabelo Dy – councilor (Cabatuan, Isabela) (2019–present)
  - Faustino Dy Jr. – governor, 2001–2004
    - Faustino Michael "Mike" Dy III – mayor of San Manuel; representative, 5th district. Son of Faustino Jr.
  - Faustino Dy III – mayor of Cauayan, 1992–2001; Representative of the 3rd District, 2001–2010; Governor, 2010–2019; Representative of the 6th District of Isabela; Speaker of the Philippine House of Representatives (2025–Present)
    - Faustino "Inno" Dy V, representative of the 6th District, 2019–present. Son of Faustino III.
  - Cesar Dy – mayor of Cauayan (2001–2010)
  - Victor Dy – ABC president Cauayan – barangay chairman of San Fermin, Cauayan
  - Krystyna Louise C. Dy – ex officio member provincial board, SK chairwoman, San Fermin, Cauayan
  - Napoleon S. Dy: representative of the 3rd District, 2010–2013.
    - Ian Paul Dy - representative, 3rd District. Son of Napoleon.
  - Faustino Kiko Dy (Mayor for 9 yrs, currently the Vice-Governor elected in 2025)
  - Faustino Inno Dy (Representative of the 6th District, currently the elected Mayor of Echague in 2025. A husband to the current City Mayor of Santiago City (2025) that was before a Representative of the 3rd district of Isabela)

== E ==
=== Earnshaw family – Cavite and Manila ===
- Manuel Earnshaw - resident commissioner
- Tomas Earnshaw - mayor

=== Ebdane family – Zambales ===
- Jun Ebdane - senator
  - Jun Omar Ebdane - mayor
  - Jun Rundstedt Ebdane - mayor

=== Echiverri family — Caloocan ===
- Enrico Echiverri – mayor (2004–2013), 1st District representative (1995–2004, 2013–2016)
  - Ricojudge Janvier Echiverri – national president, Liga ng mga Barangay (2007–2016); Ex Officio city councilor, Caloocan (representing LNB); Punong Barangay
  - Robert Dominic Echiverri – Sangguniang Kabataan National Federation vice-president (2010–2013), SK Federation president; Ex Officio city councilor

=== Ecleo family — Surigao del Norte and Dinagat Islands ===
- Ruben Ecleo Sr. – mayor of San Jose, Dinagat Islands when it was still part of Surigao del Norte, 1963–1987
- Moises Ecleo – governor of Surigao del Norte, 1988–1992
- Ruben Ecleo Jr. – mayor of San Jose, Dinagat Islands when it was still part of Surigao del Norte, 1991–1994, congressman of Dinagat Islands, 2010–2012
- Geraldine Ecleo-Villaroman – governor of Dinagat Islands, 2007–2010, vice governor of Dinagat Islands, 2010–2013, 2025–present
- Glenda B. Ecleo – governor of Dinagat Islands, 2010–2019
- Gwendolyn Ecleo – mayor of Dinagat, Dinagat Islands, 2004–2013; Provincial Board Member (Second District of Dinagat Islands), 2019–present
- Alan 1 B. Ecleo - mayor of Basilisa, Dinagat Islands, 2010–2013, and 2016–2019; Congressman of the Lone District of Dinagat Islands, 2019–2025
- Benglen B. Ecleo - Vice-Governor, 2013–2019, and 2022–2025
- Yngwie Hero B. Ecleo - Mayor of San Jose, 2019–present
- Ozzy Reubene Ecleo - Mayor of Basilisa, 2019–present
- Allan II B. Ecleo - Mayor of San Jose, 2010–2019; Councilor of San Jose, 2019–present
- Ludwig B. Ecleo - councilor of San Jose, 2022–present
- Donato P. Ecleo - councilor of San Jose, 2022–present

=== Eguia family — Zamboanga del Norte ===
- Patchito "Patchie" Eguia – mayor (2016-2022) and vice mayor (2010-2019) of Katipunan, Zamboanga del Norte, brother of Cris
- Crisostomo "Cris" Eguia, Jr. – mayor (2010-2019) and vice mayor (2016-2022) of Katipunan, Zamboanga del Norte, brother of Patchie, father of Dondon
  - Crisostomo "Dondon" Eguia, III – councilor of Katipunan, Zamboanga del Norte (2022-present), son of Cris

=== Ejército-Estrada-Estregan family — Laguna, Manila, Quezon, San Juan (Metro Manila) ===
- **Joseph Ejercito Estrada** – **13th President of the Philippines (1998–2001)**, **Vice President of the Philippines** (1992–1998), senator (1987–1992); mayor of San Juan (1969–1986); Mayor of Manila (2013-2019)
  - **Luisa Pimintel-Ejercito ("Loi Ejercito Estrada")** – senator (2001–2007) and **First Lady of the Philippines** (1998–2001)
  - Jose P. Ejercito ("Jinggoy Ejercito Estrada") – Senate president pro tempore, senator and mayor of San Juan (1992–2001); son
  - Joseph Victor Ejercito – senator, congressman, Lone District of San Juan and mayor of San Juan (2001–2010); half-brother of Jinggoy
    - Guia Gomez – mother of Joseph Victor; mayor of San Juan (2010–2019)
    - Janella Ejercito – councilor of San Juan; daughter of Jinggoy
- Emilio Ramon Ejercito ("Jeorge 'E.R.' Ejercito Estregan/Jorge Estregan/George Estregan Jr.") – governor of Laguna and mayor of Pagsanjan (2001–2010); nephew of Joseph
  - Girlie Ejercito ("Maita Sanchez") – mayor of Pagsanjan, Laguna; wife of Emilio Ramon
- Gary Jason Ejercito ("Gary Estrada") – board member, 2nd District of Quezon; brother of Emilio Ramon
- Jana Ejercito – councilor of San Juan (District 2); niece of Joseph

=== Enverga family — Quezon ===
- Manuel S. Enverga (representative of the 1st District 1953–1961)
  - Wilfrido "Willie" L. Enverga (representative of the 1st District 1987–1998; Governor of Quezon, 1998–2007; son of Manuel)
    - Wilfrido Mark M. Enverga (representative of the 1st District 2007–2016, 2019–present; grandson of Manuel)
    - Anna Katrina "Trina" M. Enverga-de la Paz (representative of the 1st District 2016–2019; granddaughter of Manuel)

=== Eriguel family — La Union ===
- Eufranio "Franny" Eriguel – mayor of Agoo (1998–2007); congressman, 2nd District (2010–2016)
  - Sandra Young Eriguel– mayor of Agoo (2007, 2010–2016); congresswoman, 2nd District (2016–2022)
  - Stefanie Ann Chan Eriguel – mayor of Agoo (2016–present)

=== Ermita family ===
- Eduardo Ermita - congressman, defense secretary, executive secretary
  - Eileen Ermita-Buhain - congresswoman
  - Lisa Ermita-Abad - mayor of Balayan

=== Escario family — Cebu ===
- Nicholas Escario - gobernadorcillo of Bantayan (1822–1834)
- Gregorio Escario - municipal president of Bantayan (1904–1908, 1910–1912); jefe militar of Bantayan (1898–1903); municipal president of Aloguinsan
- Margarito Escario - municipal president of Bantayan (1908–1910)
- Jose Escario - municipal president of Aloguinsan
- Felixberto Escario - municipal president of Bantayan (1922–1928)
- Nicolas Escario. – mayor of Cebu City (1945–1946); provincial board member; 7th district congressman (1949–1957)
- Paulino Escario Ybañez - 7th district congressman (1925–1934)
- Isidro Escario – mayor of Bantayan, (1937–1946, 1948–1960)
- Remedios Escario – mayor of Bantayan, (1960–1968, 1992–2001); vice mayor (2001–2002)
- Jesus Escario – mayor of Bantayan, (1968–1986)
- Rex Escario – mayor of Bantayan, (1988–1991)
- Geralyn Escario-Cañares – mayor of Bantayan, (2001–2010); vice mayor (1992–2001, 2010–2013)
- Dale Escario – vice mayor of Bantayan, (2007–2010)
- Ian Christopher Escario – mayor of Bantayan, (2010–2016)
- Chad Escario-Cañares – vice mayor, (2013–2016); 4th district provincial board member (2016–)
- Gualberto Escario – municipal councilor of Bantayan (2010–2016)
- Vince Escario – municipal councilor of Bantayan (2016–)

=== Escudero family — Sorsogon ===
- Manuel Escudero (representative, 4th Philippine Assembly)
- Salvador Escudero Sr. (governor; provincial board member; mayor; councilor)
  - Salvador Escudero Jr. (son of Salvador Sr; mayor; provincial board member)
    - Salvador H. Escudero III (son of Salvador Jr; Secretary of Agriculture; representative, House of Representatives; assemblyman, Batasang Pambansa; deputy minister of Agriculture and Food)
      - Evelina Escudero (wife of Salvador III; representative, House of Representatives)
      - Francis "Chiz" Escudero (son of Salvador III; representative, House of Representatives; senator; governor; President of the Senate)
      - Marie Bernadette "Dette" Escudero (daughter of Salvador III; representative, House of Representatives; Deputy Majority Leader of the House of Representatives)
- Ramon Escudero (councilor; vice mayor)
- Antonio Escudero Jr. (councilor; provincial board member; vice governor)
- Oscar Escudero (mayor)

=== Espaldon family – Sorsogon and Zamboanga ===
- Manuel Espaldon - Cabeza de Barangay of Gubat (ca. 1816/1817)
- Ernesto Mercader Espaldon - senator in the Guam Legislature
  - James V. Espaldon - senator in the Guam Legislature
- Manuel Mercader Espaldon - representative for Region IX 1978–1984
- Romulo Mercader Espaldon - representative for Tawi-Tawi 1990–1992

=== Espinosa-Martinez family — Cebu, Masbate, Iloilo City and Guimaras ===
- Pascual P. Espinosa, congressman, Iloilo City
  - Jose S. Espinosa III, mayor, Iloilo City
  - Edgar T. Espinosa, congressman and vice governor, Guimaras
  - Leo T. Espinosa, mayor, Jordan, Guimaras
    - Mark B. Espinosa, SK chairman, Jordan, Guimaras
  - Emilio Espinosa Sr.: representative, lone district, Masbate (1934–1945; 1944–1946–1953)
    - Emilio R. Espinosa Jr.: son of Emilio Sr; representative, 2nd District, Masbate (1958–1965; 1970–1972; 1998–2007)
    - Tito Espinosa: son of Emilio Sr.; representative, 1st district, Masbate (1987–1995)
      - Vida Espinosa: wife of Tito; representative, 1st district, Masbate (1995–2004)
      - Emilio Aris Espinosa: son of Tito and Vida; mayor, San Jacinto, Masbate (2001–2007)
      - Narciso Bravo Jr.: son-in-law of Vida; councilor, Masbate (1998–2001); provincial board member, Masbate (2001–2007)
    - Moises Espinosa Sr.: son of Emilio Sr.; vice-governor, governor, mayor, Masbate; representative, 2nd district, Masbate (1987–1992)
      - Moises Espinosa Jr., city mayor of Masbate
    - Mario Espinosa: nephew of Emilio Jr.; vice governor, Masbate (1998–2001)
    - Celestino Espinosa Martinez Jr.: nephew of Emilio Jr.; representative, 4th district, Cebu (1987–1998)
      - Clavel Asas-Martinez: wife of Celestino Jr.; representative, 4th district, Cebu (1998–2007)
      - Celestino Martinez III: son of Celestino Jr. and Clavel; mayor, Bogo, Cebu (2001–2007)
  - Roseller 'Roy' Ariosa, vice-governor of Zamboanga del Sur
  - Javier Ariosa, mayor of Molave, Zamboanga del Sur 1951, father of Roseller
  - Franco P. Espinosa, barangay chairman, Monica, Iloilo City,
  - Jose Hamy R. Espinosa, barangay chairman, Monica, Iloilo City
  - Frank A. Espinosa, barangay chairman, Monica, Iloilo City
  - Noel A. Espinosa, barangay chairman, Monica, Iloilo City
  - Lilianne Espinosa Sorioso, barangay chairman, Zamora, Iloilo City
  - Sergio S. Espinosa, barangay chairman, Legaspi, Iloilo City
  - Rysty Ann Espinosa, SK chairman, Zamora, Iloilo City,
  - Ma. Aida T. Espinosa, SK chairman, Monica, Iloilo City
  - Ma. Monica Leticia T. Espinosa, SK chairman, Monica, Iloilo City
  - Frances Lyn T. Espinosa, SK chairman, Monica, Iloilo City
  - Justin Espinosa, SK chairman, Zamora, Iloilo City

=== Eusebio family — Pasig ===
- Vicente Eusebio; vice mayor (1980–1986), mayor (1992–2001, 2004–2007)
  - Soledad Eusebio; wife of Vicente; mayor (2001–2004)
  - Robert "Bobby" Eusebio; son of Vicente; councilor (1998–2007), mayor (2007–2013, 2016–2019)
    - Maribel Andaya-Eusebio; wife of Bobby; mayor of Pasig (2013–2016)
  - Ricky Eusebio; brother of Bobby; councilor (2010–2016), congressman of the lone district (2016–2019)

== F ==
=== Fajardo family — Nueva Ecija, Bulacan, Pampanga, Laguna, Cavite, Rizal, Bicol Region ===
- Pacifico M. Fajardo, congressman of 3rd District of Nueva Ecija (1992–2001)
- Lorelie Fajardo, deputy presidential spokesperson; presidential assistant for Central Luzon
- Mohammad Omar Fajardo, congressman of Overseas Filipino Workers (OFW) Sector (1995–2004)

=== Fariñas family — Ilocos Norte ===
- Rodolfo "Rudy" Fariñas – representative of the First District (1998–2001, 2010–2019), governor (1988–1998), mayor of Laoag (1980–1986)
  - Carlos Fariñas – son of Rudy, vice mayor of Laoag (2022–present),
  - Ria Fariñas – provincial board member of the first district (2013–2019), representative of the First District (2019–2022); daughter of Rudy
  - Rodolfo Fariñas Jr. – SK Federation president of Ilocos Norte; son of Rudy
  - Rudy Caesar Fariñas II – SK Federation president of Laoag, Barangay chairman of Barit, Laoag; son of Rudy
- Roger Fariñas – mayor of Laoag (1995–2004); brother of Rudy
- Michael Fariñas – vice mayor of Laoag, (2013–2018), mayor (2004–2013); brother of Rudy
  - Chevylle Fariñas – mayor of Laoag (2013–2019), Laoag ABC president (2010–2013); widow of Michael
  - Jeff Fariñas – councilor, Laoag (2013–present)

=== Festin family — Romblon ===
- Venizar Maravilla (Provincial Board member); second cousin of Andrew Fondevilla
- Eugenio Festin (mayor of Odiongan); father of Leonardo Festin; great-grandfather of Andrew Fondevilla and Venizar
  - Leonardo Festin (representative of Romblon); Father-in-law of Patriotismo Fondevilla; grandfather of Andrew Fondevilla; granduncle of Venizar
- Andrew Fondevilla (mayor of San Andres and Provincial Board member); son of Patriotismo Fondevilla; son-in-law of Leonardo

=== Ferrer family — Cavite ===
- Luis Olimpo Ferrer Sr. – governor (1919–1921)
  - Luis Asuncion Ferrer Jr. – governor (1940–1944)
    - Luis Sarayba Ferrer III – vice governor
      - Antonio Alandy Ferrer – representative of the Sixth District (2010–2013, 2022–present), mayor of General Trias (2013–2022)
      - Luis Alandy Ferrer IV – mayor of General Trias (2004–2013, 2022–present), representative of the Sixth District (2013–2022), Board member of the Second District (2001–2004)

=== Fetalino family — Romblon ===
- Deogracias Fetalino (mayor of Odiongan), brother-in-law of Emilio Firmalo; uncle of Francisco and Alfonso Firmalo and Jose Firmalo
- Robert Muyo (mayor of Calatrava); second cousin twice removed of Deogracias

=== Firmalo family — Romblon ===
- Emilio Firmalo (mayor of Odiongan)
  - Francisco Firmalo (mayor of Odiongan)
    - Eduardo "Lolong" Firmalo, (governor and congressman)
      - Trina Firmalo-Fabic, (mayor of Odiongan, governor of Romblon)
  - Alfonso Firmalo (Odiongan mayor)
    - Baltazar Firmalo (mayor of Odiongan)
  - Jose Firmalo (mayor of Odiongan, governor of Romblon)

=== Fondevilla family — Romblon ===
- Patriotismo Fondevilla (37th governor)
  - Andrew Fondevilla (mayor of San Andres and Provincial Board member)
- Prudencio Fortu (mayor of Calatrava)
  - Ronnie Fortu (mayor of Calatrava)
  - Elmer Fortu (mayor of Calatrava)
- Dennis Corpin (vice mayor of Santa Maria)
- Marlon Fojas (mayor of Corcuera)
- Maria Imelda Fedelicio-Mayor (councilor of Santa Fe)
- Bibiano Fanlo (mayor of Corcuera)
- Eddie Mazo (mayor of Corcuera)
- Felix Ylagan (Provincial Board member)
- Sergio Fondevilla (mayor of Corcuera)
- Vidal Fallaria (Corcuera mayor)
- Senen Fanlo (mayor of Corcuera)
- Josefino Fajilago (mayor of Corcuera)
- Aubrey Fabiala (vice-mayor of Corcuera)

=== Fresnedi family — Muntinlupa ===
- Jaime Fresnedi – Muntinlupa lone district representative (2022–present), Mayor of Muntinlupa (1998–2007, 2013–2022), Vice Mayor of Muntinlupa (1987–1998)
  - Loreta Obong-Fresnedi (wife) – 2007 mayoralty candidate
  - Jedi Presnedi (nephew) – Muntinlupa 1st district councilor (2022–present)
- Allen Fresnedi-Ampaya – Barangay Poblacion, Muntinlupa captain, 2025 vice-mayoral candidate

=== Fua family — Siquijor ===
- Orlando B. Fua Sr., representative – Lone District; 1987–1998; 2007–2013; governor; 1998–2007
  - Orlando B. Fua Jr., representative – Lone District; 1998–2007; governor; 2007–2013
  - Orlando B. Fua, III, SK Federation president; 2007–present
  - Orpheus Fua, mayor of Lazi; 2007–present
  - Orville Fua, board member, 2nd District; 2007–present

=== Fuentebella family — Camarines Sur ===
- Mariano Fuentebella, Gobernadorcillo – Sagñay; governor – Ambos Camarines (1912–1916)
- Manuel Fuentebella, representative – 2nd District (1925–1931)
- Jose Fuentebella, representative – 2nd District (1935–1946); governor – Ambos Camarines (1916)
  - Felix Fuentebella, representative – 2nd District (1953–1972); governor (1976–1986)
    - Arnulfo Fuentebella, representative – 3rd District; (1992–2001, 2004–2010); representative – 4th District (2010–2013); speaker of the Philippine House of Representatives, 2001
  - Felix William Fuentebella, representative – 3rd District (2001–2004); representative – 4th District (2013–2016)
  - Arnulf Bryan Fuentebella, mayor – Tigaon (2007–2016)
  - Evelyn Fuentebella, mayor – Sagñay (2010–2016)

=== Furigay family - Lamitan, Basilan ===
- Oric Furigay, mayor.
- Rose Furigay, mayor. Wife of Oric.

== G ==
=== Galicia family — Davao Region ===
- Emmanuel D. Galicia – City Fiscal and councilor, & Majority Floor Leader
- Michael O. Galicia – provincial board member
- Paul P. Galicia – provincial board member

=== Garcia family — Bataan ===
- Enrique "Tet" Garcia Jr. – governor (1992–1993, 2004–2013); member of the House of Representatives from the 2nd District (1995–2004; 2013–2016), vice governor-elect (2016, died before taking office)
  - Albert S. Garcia – governor (2013–2022); member of the House of Representatives from the 2nd District (2004–2013, 2022–present); mayor of Balanga (1998–2004)
  - Joet Garcia – governor (2022–present); member of the House of Representatives from the 2nd District, (2016–2022); mayor of Balanga (2007–2016)
  - Gila Garcia – mayor of Dinalupihan (2013–2022); member of the House of Representatives from the 3rd District (2022–present)

=== Garcia family — Cebu ===
- Vicente Oracoy Garcia (1896–1932)
  - Jesus Paras Garcia Sr. (1918–2004) — Lawyer and delegate to the Philippine Constitutional Convention of 1971
    - Jesus Biano Garcia Jr. (b. 1945) — 29th Secretary of Transportation and Communications (1992–1996)
    - Alvin Biano Garcia (b.1946) — 25th Mayor of Cebu City (1995–2001) and 14th Vice Mayor of Cebu City. (1988–1995)
      - Raymond Alvin Neri Garcia — 28th Mayor of Cebu City (2024–2025), 20th Vice Mayor of Cebu City (2022–2024), Cebu City Councilor (2016–2022), and Barangay Councilor of Kamputhaw, Cebu City (2010–2016)
  - Pablo Paras Garcia (1925–2021) — 23rd Governor of Cebu (1995–2004), 6th Vice Governor of Cebu (1969–1971), 14th Cebu 2nd District Representative (2007–2013), 9th Cebu 3rd District Representative (1987–1995)
    - Gwendolyn "Gwen" Fiel Garcia (b. 1955) — 24th Governor of Cebu (2004–2012; 2019–2025) and 13th Cebu 3rd District Representative (2013–2018)
      - Maria Esperanza Christina Garcia Codilla-Frasco (b. 1981) — 18th Secretary of Tourism (2022–present), Mayor of Liloan (2016–2022)
        - Vincent Franco "Duke" Domingo Frasco (husband of Christina, b. 1980) — Deputy House Speaker (2025–present), 11th Cebu 5th District Representative (2019–present), and Mayor of Liloan (2007–2016)
      - Maria Estella Carissa Garcia Codilla (b. 1983) — 2nd Nominee of Ako Bisaya Partylist (2025)
    - Winston Fiel Garcia (b. 1958) — President and General Manager of the Government Service Insurance System (GSIS) (2001–2010) and Provincial Board Member (1986–1995)
    - Nelson Gamaliel Fiel Garcia (1959–2020) — Mayor of Dumanjug (2010–2016)
    - Marlon Socrates Fiel Garcia (1962–2020) — Mayor of Barili (2010–2016), Vice Mayor of Barili (2010–2013), Legislative officer at the House of Representatives (1987–1989)
    - Pablo John "PJ" Fiel Garcia (b. 1967) — 12th Cebu 3rd District Representative (2007–2013; 2019–2022)
      - Karen Hope Flores Garcia (wife of PJ, b. 1974) — 14th Cebu 3rd District Representative (2025–present)
  - Tomas Paras Garcia (1927–2023) — Mayor of Dumanjug (1972–1987)
  - Innocente Paras Garcia (1929–1961) — Municipal councilor of Dumanjug

=== Garcia family — Davao City ===
- Leon Garcia Sr.: mayor (before 1945)
  - Manuel Garcia: son of Leon; representative, 2nd district (1978–1986; 1992–2001)
    - Vincent J. Garcia: son of Manuel; representative, 2nd district (2001–2010, 2019–present)
    - Mylene J. Garcia-Albano: daughter of Manuel; representative, 2nd district, Davao City (2010–2019); Ambassador to Japan
      - Rodito Albano; husband of Mylene, congressman and governor of Isabela (see Albano family)
      - Augusto Javier G. Campos III: grandson of Manuel; city councilor, 2nd District (2019–present)

=== Garin family — Iloilo ===
- Oscar Garin Sr. – representative, 1st District, (1992–1998, 2001–2004), mayor of Guimbal
- Ninfa S. Garin – mayor of San Joaquin
- Oscar "Richard" S. Garin Jr. – vice governor (2010–2013), representative, 1st District (2013–2019), mayor of Miagao (2022–present)
- Janette Garin – representative, 1st District, (2004–2013, 2019–present); Secretary of Health (2015–2016)
- Sharon S. Garin – representative, AAMBIS-OWA Party-list (2010–2013)
- Christine S. Garin – mayor of Guimbal, Iloilo, vice governor
- Janette (Jennifer) Garin Colada – vice mayor of Guimbal

=== Gatchalian family — Valenzuela ===
- Sherwin Gatchalian: senator, (2016–present); mayor (2004–2013); representative, 1st District (2001–2004, 2013–2016)
- Rexlon Gatchalian: brother of Sherwin; representative, 1st District (2004–2013, 2022–2023); mayor (2013–2022)
- Weslie Gatchalian – brother of Rexlon; representative, 1st District (2016–2022); mayor (2022–present)
- Kenneth Gatchalian – brother of Weslie; representative, 1st District (2025–present)

=== Gatlabayan family — Rizal ===
- Angelito Gatlabayan – mayor of Antipolo (1998–2007), representative of Antipolo's 2nd district (2007–2010)
  - Pining Gatlabayan – councilor of Antipolo's 2nd district (2013–2016), vice mayor of Antipolo (2016–present)

=== Go family — Davao Region ===
- Bong Go – senator of the Philippines (2019–present)
  - Chrence Go – vice mayor-elect of Lupon, Davao Oriental (2025–present)

=== Go family — Isabela ===
- Deodoro T. Go – mayor of San Mariano
- Edgar T. Go – mayor of San Mariano
- Ana Cristina S. Go – board member and representative, 2nd District
- Ed Christopher S. Go – representative, 2nd District
- Ed Christian S. Go – board member, 2nd district
- Girlie May T. Go – municipal councilor of San Mariano
- Rebecca T. Go – municipal councilor of San Mariano
- Paul Anthenor T. Go – barangay federation chair, San Mariano
- Joel T. Go – barangay federation chair, San Mariano

=== Gonzales family — Pampanga ===
- Aurelio Gonzales Jr. – representative from Pampanga's 3rd district
- Aurelio Brenz Gonzales – city councilor and vice mayor of San Fernando, Pampanga
- Alyssa Michaela Gonzales – board member and representative of Pampanga's 3rd district
- Michaeline "MyMy" Gonzales – board member of Pampanga's 3rd district since 2025

=== Galima family — Nueva Vizcaya ===
- Epifanio C. Galima Sr. – Board Member
- Pilar D. Galima – Board Member, Councilor of Solano
- Epifanio Lamberto D. Galima – vice governor (2013–2019), mayor of Solano
- Eunice Galima Gambol – Board Member (2019–present)
- Lee Basil G. Galima – Brgy. Kagawad

=== Gordon family — Zambales ===
- James Leonard Gordon – mayor of Olongapo, 1963–1967
  - Amelia Gordon – mayor of Olongapo, 1968–1972
    - Richard Gordon – mayor of Olongapo, 1980–1986; 1988–1993, senator, 2004–2010; 2016–2022
    - Katherine Gordon – representative of the 1st District, 1988–1995, mayor of Olongapo, 1995–2004
    - Brian Gordon – councilor, Olongapo (2004–2007)
    - Bugsy Gordon de los Reyes – councilor, Olongapo (2010–2013)
  - James "Bong" Gordon Jr. – representative of the 1st District, 1995–2004, mayor of Olongapo, 2004–2013
  - Anne Marie Gordon – vice governor, 2007–2010
    - John Carlos de los Reyes – candidate, 2013 Philippine Senate election; candidate, 2010 Philippine presidential election; councilor, Olongapo (1995–1998, 2007–2010)

=== Gorriceta family — Iloilo ===
- Michael Gorriceta – member of the House of Representatives
- Kathryn Joyce Gorriceta – member of the House of Representatives

=== Gumander Family — Maguindanao and maguindanao del norte ===
- Datu Batuling Bantayao Gumander – municipal councilor of Sultan Kudarat (1962–1968), vice mayor of Sultan Kudarat (1968–1971), and a prominent revolutionary leader in the Moro National Liberation Front (MNLF).
- Datu Kali Gumander – grandfather of Batuling, a noted Muslim scholar and judge in the region.

=== Guico family — Pangasinan ===
- Ramon Guico Jr. – mayor of Binalonan (1988–1998; 2001–2010; 2019–2022), 5th district representative (2022–present)
  - Ramon V. Guico III – vice mayor of Binalonan (2007–2010), mayor of Binalonan (2010–2019), 5th district representative (2019–2022), governor (2022–present)
  - Ramon Ronald V. Guico IV – mayor of Binalonan (2022–present)

=== Guingona family — Agusan, Bukidnon, Negros Oriental and Misamis Oriental ===
- Teofisto Guingona Sr. – senator (1919–1925), governor of Agusan (1913–1917) and assemblyman of the 2nd District of Negros Oriental (1909–1912)
  - **Teofisto Guingona Jr.** – **Vice President of the Philippines** (2001–2004), senator (1987–1993; 1998–2001), Secretary of Foreign Affairs (2001–2002), Secretary of Justice (1995–1998), Executive Secretary (1993–1995)
  - Ruth Guingona – mayor of Gingoog and second lady of the Philippines (2001–2004)
    - Teofisto Guingona III – representative, 2nd District of Bukidnon (2004–2010) and senator (2010–2016)

=== Gutierrez family ===
- Rufino Navarro - vice-governor, representative
  - Merceditas Gutierrez - secretary of justice
    - Margarita Gutierrez - undersecretary of justice

== H ==
=== Hataman family of Basilan ===
- Hadjiman "Jim" Hataman Saliman – governor
  - Jay Hataman – provincial board member. Son of Hadjiman.
- Mujiv Hataman – representative, lone district of Basilan. Brother of Hadjiman.
  - Sitti Djalia Turabin-Hataman – mayor of Isabela. Wife of Mujiv.
  - Amin Hataman – provincial board member. Son of Mujiv and Sitti.
- Gulam "Boy" Hataman – vice mayor of Sumisip. Brother of Hadjiman and Mujiv.
  - Jul-Adnan Hataman – mayor of Sumisip. Son of Gulam.

=== Hofer family of Zamboanga Sibugay ===
- George T. Hofer Sr. — congressman and governor of Zamboanga Sibugay (2001–2010), mayor of Titay (1992–1998) and member of the House of Representatives from Zamboanga del Sur's 3rd District (1998–2001)
  - Dulce Kintanar–Hofer (wife of George) — mayor of Titay (1998–2001)
    - George "Jet" K. Hofer Jr. (son of George and Dulce) — Provincial Administrator
    - Dulce Ann Hofer (daughter of George and Dulce) — governor (2022–present) and member of the House of Representatives from Zamboanga Sibugay's 2nd congressional district (2007–2010, 2013–2022)

=== Hontiveros family — Capiz and Cebu City ===
- Jose Hontiveros – senator of the Insular Government of the Philippine Islands from 1922 to 1928
  - Risa Hontiveros – senator of the Philippines since 2016 and previously served as a party-list representative for Akbayan from 2004 to 2010
- Dondon Hontiveros – acting vice mayor of Cebu City from 2021 and 2022 and 2024 to present

== I ==
=== Ilagan family — Nueva Ecija and Tarlac ===
- Hugo L. Ilagan – Secretary of the Treasury, First Philippine Republic, 1899
- Mauricio Ilagan – Paymaster-General, First Philippine Republic, 1899; Provincial Fiscal of Tarlac, Insular Government of the Philippine Islands, 1904–1906; assemblyman, 1st District of Tarlac, 1st Philippine Legislature, 1909, and 2nd Philippine Legislature, 1909–1912
- Florencio Ilagan – mayor, Bongabon, Nueva Ecija, 1928–1931
- Gregorio Ilagan – mayor, Bongabon, 1946–1952
- Jesus Ilagan – representative, 2nd District of Nueva Ecija, 1949–1953
- Ruben H. Ilagan – mayor, Tarlac City, 1967–1971

=== Imperial family — Albay ===
- Carlos Imperial – representative, 2nd District, 9th, 10th, and 12th Congress
- Norma B. Imperial – representative, 2nd District, 11th Congress
- Harold O. Imperial – vice governor, 2010–present
- Niño "Snookie" B. Imperial – provincial board member, 2nd District

=== Ibay family — Pasay ===
- Lito Ibay
- Lexter N. Ibay – councilor, 1st District, 2001–2006, 2007–2013
- Ileana Ibay – councilor, 2nd District, 2010–2013

== J ==
=== Jaen family — Leganes, Iloilo ===
- Zacarias Jaen, municipal president (1900–1902)
- Martin Perales Jaen, mayor (1946–1951)
- Mariano Jaen, municipal councilor, vice mayor
- Adolfo E. Jaen, mayor
- Josil P. Jaen, mayor (1986–1998)
- Adolfo D. Jaen II, municipal councilor
- Vicente P. Jaen II, mayor, municipal councilor, ABC president
- Antonio S. Jaen Sr., municipal councilor
- Martin D. Jaen III, municipal councilor, barangay councilor, Poblacion
- Lyle Jaen Lebaquin (m. Bartolome), vice mayor, municipal councilor
- Paul Jaen-Krafft – ABC president
- Moses Oliver Jaen Bito-onon, SK Federation President

=== Jagunap family — Leganes, Iloilo ===
- Esperidion Jagunap Sr., mayor, board member
- Dionzon Belandres Jagunap, vice mayor
- Niño Vincent Jagunap Vallejo, barangay chairman, San Vicente, ABC president
- Notchka Jagunap Vallejo, Sangguniang Kabataan chairman, San Vicente
- Niel Joshua Jagunap Raymundo, Sangguniang Kabataan chairman, Poblacion, SK Federation vice president

=== Jalandoni Jover family — Iloilo City ===
- Vicente Jalandoni Jover, president of La Paz (now a district of Iloilo City) during the American Regime.
- Dominador Jalandoni Jover, vice mayor and mayor during the Post-World War II era.

=== Jalosjos family — Zamboanga del Norte, Zamboanga Sibugay, Misamis Occidental ===
- Romeo G. Jalosjos (1940–2026) — Zamboanga del Norte assemblyman to the Regular Batasang Pambansa (1984–1986) and congressman of the First District of Zamboanga del Norte (1995–2002).
  - Seth Frederick P. Jalosjos, mayor of Dapitan (2022–2025), First District board member (2007–2010), and representative (2010–2019) of the First District of Zamboanga del Norte. Son of Romeo Sr.
  - Romeo M. Jalosjos Jr., representative (2019–2022) of the First District of Zamboanga del Norte, and representative of the Second District of Zamboanga Sibugay (2010–2013). Son of Romeo Sr.
    - Marjorie N. Jalosjos, DILG Assistant Secretary for Special Concerns, Barangay Captain of Patawag, Liloy, Zamboanga del Norte (2019–2025). Wife of Romeo Jr.
  - Rommel A. Jalosjos, governor of Zamboanga Sibugay (2010–2013). Son of Romeo Sr.
  - Svetlana P. Jalosjos-de Leon, mayor of Baliangao, Misamis Occidental (2010–2013). Daughter of Romeo Sr.
  - Sushmita R. Jalosjos, barangay captain of Dawo, Dapitan City (2023–2025). Daughter of Romeo Sr.
- Cecilia G. Jalosjos-Carreon, mayor of Piñan, Zamboanga del Norte (2010–2012, 2016–2025), and representative of the First District of Zamboanga del Norte (2002–2010). Sister of Romeo Sr.
  - Rodolfo H. Carreon Jr., city mayor of Dapitan (2001–2004). Husband of Cecilia.
  - Angelica Jalosjos Carreon, First District board member (2022–2025), city councilor of Dapitan (2019–2022). Daughter of Cecilia.
- Rosalina G. Jalosjos-Johnson (1947–2026) — governor of Zamboanga del Norte (2022–2025), city mayor of Dapitan (2013–2022), and city councilor of Dapitan (2010–2013). Sister of Romeo Sr.
- Dominador G. Jalosjos Jr., city mayor of Dapitan (2004–2012). Brother of Romeo Sr.
- Anabel G. Jalosjos-Endique, First District board member of Zamboanga del Norte (2016–2019). Sister of Romeo Sr.
- Cesar G. Jalosjos, representative of the Third District of Zamboanga del Norte (2004–2013). Brother of Romeo Sr.
  - Johanna D. Jalosjos-Parreño, Third District board member of Zamboanga del Norte (2010–2013). Daughter of Cesar.

=== Jardenil family — Iloilo City ===
- Gil Jardenil, vice mayor of La Paz and Jaro
- Remo Jardenil, fiscal of Iloilo City
- Renato Jardenil Espinosa, barangay captain of Cagamutan Sur, Iloilo

=== Javier family — Navotas ===
- Patrick Joseph Javier, vice mayor (2001–2013)
- Victor Javier, mayor (1980–1986)

== K ==
=== Kalaw family ===
- Teodoro Kalaw – congressman
  - Maria Kalaw Katigbak – senator
  - Eva Estrada Kalaw – assemblywoman, senator

=== Kho family — Masbate ===
- Antonio Tero Kho – mayor of Cataingan (1988–1992), representative of the Third District (1992–1995), governor (1998–2007; 2016–2025), representative of the Second District (2007–2013), representative of the First District (2025–present)
  - Elisa Tingcungco-Kho, governor (2007–2010), representative of the Second District (2013–2022; 2025–present), vice governor (2022–2025). Wife of Antonio.
  - Wilton Tan Kho – mayor of Cataingan (2010–2016), representative of the Third District (2019–present). Son of Antonio.
    - Kristine Salve Hao-Kho, mayor of Mandaon (2022–present). Wife of Wilton.
  - Olga "Ara" Tingcungco Kho – vice governor (2019–2022), representative of the Second District (2022–2025), mayor of Masbate City (2025–present)
  - Richard Tingcungco Kho – representative of the First District (2022–2025), governor (2025–present)

=== Khonghun family — Zambales ===
- Jeffrey Khonghun – mayor of Subic, Zambales (2004–2010), representative of the First District (2013–2022), mayor of Castillejos, Zambales (2022–present)
  - Jonathan "Jon" Khonghun – mayor of Subic, Zambales (2019–present)
  - Jefferson "Jay" Khonghun – mayor of Subic, Zambales (2010–2019), vice governor of Zambales (2019–2022), representative of the First District (2022–present)
  - Jacqueline Rose Ferrer Khonghun – vice governor of Zambales (2022–present)
    - Jamiel Khonghun Escalona – city councilor of Olongapo (2019–present)

== L ==
=== Labadlabad family — Sindangan, Zamboanga del Norte ===
- Rosendo "Dodoy" Labadlabad, mayor of Sindangan, Zamboanga del Norte (2019–2025) and representative of the second district of Zamboanga del Norte (2007–2016).
  - Glona Labadlabad, representative of the second district of Zamboanga del Norte (2016–2025). Wife of Dodoy.
  - Irene Labadlabad, representative of the second district of Zamboanga del Norte (2025–present). Daughter of Dodoy and Glona.
- Victoria "Ahmai" Labadlabad, Sangguniang Bayan member of Sindangan, Zamboanga del Norte (2022–present). Sister of Dodoy.

=== Lacson family — Negros Occidental, Iloilo, Manila, Antique, Cavite, and Pampanga ===
- Aniceto Lacson – president of the Republic of Negros (1898–1899)
- Arsenio Lacson – congressman, 2nd District of Manila (1949–1952) and mayor of Manila (1952–1962)
- Ignacio Lacson Arroyo Sr. – Filipino politician, grandson of Gen. Aniceto Lacson, father of First Gentleman Mike Arroyo, and Iggy Arroyo
- Isaac Lacson – governor of Negros Occidental (1928–1931), senator (1934–1935), and congressman of the 3rd District of Negros Occidental; son of Aniceto Lacson
- Rafael B. Lacson – governor of Negros Occidental (1946–1951), former mayor of Talisay, Negros Occidental, cousin of Isaac Lacson
- Daniel Lacson – governor of Negros Occidental during the Fourth Republic (1986–1987), and Fifth Republic (1988–1992)
- Bong Lacson – current governor of Negros Occidental (since 2019), former vice governor of Negros Occidental (2013 to 2019), mayor of San Carlos (2001 to 2010)
- Jose Carlos "Kako" Lacson – congressman, 3rd District of Negros Occidental (1987–1998; 2001–2010)
- Aurelio Lacson Locsin Sr. – mayor of Bacolod (1946)
- David Lacson – mayor of E.B Magalona, Negros Occidental
- David Aliman Lacson – councilor of Kaliglig, Cauayan, Negros Occidental (1983–1987)
- Dennis Lacson – councilor, Imus, Cavite
- Eusebio Lacson – mayor of Tibiao, Antique
- Ping Lacson – senator, former Director-General of the Philippine National Police
- Agustin Lacson – Gobernadorcillo of San Fernando, Pampanga (1854–1855)
- Cosme Lacson – Gobernadorcillo of San Fernando, Pampanga (1856–1857)
- Manuel S. Lacson – Gobernadorcillo of Magalang, Pampanga (1868)
- Anacleto S. Lacson – Gobernadorcillo of Magalang, Pampanga (1871–1873)
- Aniceto S. Lacson – Gobernadorcillo of Magalang, Pampanga (1891–1893)
- Daniel O. Lacson – Alcalde Mayor of Magalang, Pampanga (1899–1901)
- Daniel T. Lacson Sr. – mayor of Magalang, Pampanga (1968–1986)
- Daniel L. Lacson, Jr. – mayor of Magalang, Pampanga (1988–1998)
- Maria Lourdes P. Lacson – first female mayor of Magalang, Pampanga
- Benjamin Lacson – mayor of Concepcion, Tarlac (2001–2004)
- Andres Lacson – mayor of Concepcion, Tarlac, and vice chairman of Aksyon Demokratiko (2013–2022)

=== Lacuna family — Manila ===
- Danilo Lacuna – vice mayor (1970–1971, 1988–1992, 1998–2007), councilor of the 3rd District (1967–1975)
- Honey Lacuna – mayor (2022–2025), vice mayor (2016–2022) councilor of the 4th District (2004–2013)
- Dennis H. Lacuna – councilor of the 6th District (2004–2013)
- Leilani H. Lacuna – Liga ng mga Barangay president (2018–present), councilor of the 6th District (2013–2016)
- Philip H. Lacuna – councilor of the 6th District (2019–present)

=== Lagbas family — Misamis Oriental ===
- Danilo Lagbas – member of the House of Representatives from Misamis Oriental's 1st district (2004–2008)
  - Karen Lagbas – member of the House of Representatives from Misamis Oriental's 1st district (2025–present); daughter

=== Lagman family — Albay and Quezon City ===
- Edcel Lagman – member of the House of Representatives from Albay's 1st district (1987–1998, 2004–2013, 2016–2025)
  - Alex Burce Lagman – mayor of Tabaco (1992–1995, 2001–2004)
  - Krisel Lagman Luistro – member of the House of Representatives from Albay's 1st district (1998–2004)
  - Edcel Lagman Jr. – governor (2022–2025), vice governor (2019–2022), member of the House of Representatives from Albay's 1st district (2013–2016), Quezon City councilor (2004–2012)
  - Ivy Xenia Lim-Lagman – Quezon City councilor (2012–2013)

=== Lagon family — Cebu ===
- Sonny Lagon – member of the House of Representatives
  - Daphne Lagon – member of the House of Representatives; wife

=== Lajara family — Laguna ===
- Severino "Binoy" J. Lajara – mayor of Calamba (1994–2004)
  - Christian Niño S. Lajara – Calamba city councilor (2007–2016), provincial board member (2019–present), Sangguniang Kabataan Federation (SKF) president
  - Karla Adajar-Lajara – San Pablo city councilor (2013–2022), provincial board member (2022–present)
  - Saturnino J. Lajara – Association of Barangay Council (ABC) president, Calamba city councilor (2016–present)
  - Diosdado J. Lajara – Association of Barangay Council (ABC) president, city councilor
  - Soliman "Rajay" B. Lajara – Calamba city councilor (2019–2022)
  - Aigrette P. Lajara – barangay chairman of Makiling, Calamba (2019–present)

=== Lapid family — Pampanga ===
- Lito Lapid – senator (2004–2016, 2019–present) and governor (1995–2004)
  - Mark Lapid – chief operations officer, Tourism Infrastructure and Enterprise Zone Authority (TIEZA) and governor (2004–2007); son

=== Lapus family — Tarlac ===
- Jeci A. Lapus – congressman, 3rd District
- Jesli Lapus – congressman, 3rd District, Education Secretary (2006–2010)

=== Laurel family — Batangas ===
- **José P. Laurel** – 3rd **President of the Philippines** (puppet president under Japanese rule; 1943–1945)
  - Jose Laurel Jr. – speaker of the House of Representatives
  - **Salvador "Doy" H. Laurel** – 10th **Vice President of the Philippines** (1986–1992); Prime Minister of the Philippines (1986–1987)
  - Sotero Laurel – senator
  - José Laurel III – ambassador to Japan
  - Jose C. Laurel V – governor; ambassador to Japan
  - Peter Laurel – vice governor
  - Lally Laurel-Trinidad – representative 3rd District
  - Jose Macario Laurel IV – representative 3rd District

=== Lazatin family — Angeles City and San Fernando, Pampanga ===
- Rafael Lazatin – governor (1951–1959); mayor of Angeles (1972–1980); assemblyman (1984–1986)
  - Carmelo "Tarzan" F. Lazatin – representative, 1st District, Pampanga (1997–1998; 2007–2013); mayor, Angeles City (1998–2007)
    - Carmelo "Pogi" G. Lazatin Jr. – mayor, Angeles City (2019–2025); representative, 1st District, Pampanga (2025–present)
    - Carmelo "Jonjon" Lazatin – representative, 1st District, Pampanga (2016–2025); mayor, Angeles City (2025–present)
- Jaime "Jimmy" Lazatin – vice mayor of San Fernando, Pampanga (2013–2022)

=== Leachon family — Oriental Mindoro ===
- Salvador "Doy" Leachon – representative, 1st District (2013–2022), mayor of Calapan (2007–2013, 2025–2028)
- Chi Balbuena Leachon – councilor, Calapan
- Leachon, RL – city councilor / provincial board member (2022–2025; PCL president, ex officio), provincial board member (2025–2028)
- Leachon, Mikan – provincial board member (2019–2022)

=== Leaño family — Romblon ===
- Santiago Leaño (Tablas mayor)
- Ronnie Fortu (mayor of Calatrava)
- Elmer Fortu (mayor of Calatrava)
- Mutya Reyes (Barangay captain of Dapawan, Odiongan)

=== Leviste family —Batangas ===
- Feliciano Leviste – governor (1947–1971)
  - Expedito Leviste – member of the Interim Batasang Pambansa (1978–1984) and representative of the 2nd District (1969–1972)
- Antonio Leviste – governor (1972–1980)
  - Loren Legarda-Leviste – senator (1998–2004; 2007–2019; 2022–present)
    - Leandro Leviste – representative of the 1st District (2025–present)
- Mark Leviste – vice governor (2007–2016, 2019–present)

=== Lecaroz family — Marinduque and Batangas ===
- Francisco "Paquito" M. Lecaroz, congressman (1957–1972), mayor of Santa Cruz, Marinduque (1980–1986)
- Aristeo M. Lecaroz, governor (1967–1988)
- Vicente M. Lecaroz, mayor of San Juan, Batangas (1967–1986)

=== Librado family — Davao City ===
- Erasto L. Librado: councilor (1992)
  - Marlene A. Librado: wife, councilor (1993–2001)
  - Angela A. Librado: daughter, councilor (2001–2010)
  - Leah A. Librado: daughter, councilor (2010–2019)
  - Pamela A. Librado: daughter, councilor (2019–2022)

=== Lim family — Masbate ===
- **Lino G. Lim Sr** – vice mayor (1969–1971), mayor (1971–1982, died)
- **Nestor C. Lim** – PCGG director, Masbate (1986), OIC mayor (1987–1988), elected mayor (1988–1995)

==== Lim Family -Misamis Occidental ====
- **Hon.Justino Antonio Lim Sr.**+ (1995-2004 Mayor of Jimenez), Eldest Son of Benito Lim
- **Hon.Rogelio Yabo** (SB Member of Jimenez), Brother in Law of Antonio Lim
- **Hon.Norma Lim** (2004-Present Vice Mayor of Jimenez), Daughter in Law of Antonio Lim
- **Hon.Rosenda S.Lim** (President, RB Jimenez, Former First Lady)
- **Hon. Lina Luzana LimQuimbo (**Local Tourism Chair, niece of Rosenda)
- **Hon. Ranulfo LimQuimbo (**2004-Present Mayor of Jimenez, Husband of Lina) Cousin of **Congressman Ernie Dulalas Clarete, !st District of Misamis Occ.**

=== Lim family — Southern Leyte ===
- **Hon. Napoleon Lim Cuaton,** mayor of Saint Bernard (2010-2013,2013-2016), Chief of Police (San Fernando, Pampanga, Pasay City and Caloocan City); Aviation Security Group Chief, POEA Anti-Illegal Recruitment Task Force Chief; **United States of America Federal Bureau of Investigation (FBI) agent and Central Intelligence Agency InterPol.** Nephew of Fiscal Dunga Lim and grandson of Gama Lim Ching.
- **Hon. Jocelyn Lim- Bungcaras**, mayor of Saint Bernard (2025-present); Vice-Mayor (2013-2016, 2016-2019),daughter of Mayor Felix B. Lim, grandniece of Gama Lim Ching.
- **Fiscal Leslie " Dunga" Kho Lim** – Prosecutor, **Ateneo De Manila University Law Alumnus**, Copra and Shipping Magnate and son of Lim Ching Gama of St. Bernard. His wife Anita Yu is 1st Cousin of **Gov. Roberto Uy** of Zamboanga del Norte. Aquila Fraternity Brother and friend of **First Gentleman Jose Miguel " Mike" Arroyo and President Gloria Macapagal- Arroyo.**
- **Hon. Maria "EeYan" Kho Lim-Yap**, mayor of Saint Bernard (1998-2001,2001-2004,2004-2007)sister of Fiscal Dunga Lim.
- **Hon. Felix B. Lim**, mayor of Saint Bernard(1988-1998);Vice-Mayor(1998-2007), cousin of Fiscal Dunga Lim
- **Hon. Atty. Jose "Yukim" Kho Lim**-St. Bernard Sangguniang Bayan member (1968-1988), brother of Fiscal Dunga Lim.
- **Hon. Engr. Jose "Yuki" Bercero Lim, Jr**.-Molave, Zambo. Sur Sangguniang Bayan (1988-2001) Vice- mayoralty Candidate (1998,2001). 2nd Cousin of Fiscal Dunga Lim and brother of Jose Lunsing Lim, Sr.
- **Hon. Jose Lunsing Bercero Lim, Sr**.- ABC President,Ex-Officio: Molave, Zambo. Sur, 2nd cousin of Fiscal Dunga Lim , son of Jose Lim Chewa (1st cousin Gama Lim Ching) and Irene Espinosa Bercero. Relative to **Vice-Governor Roseller "Roy" Ariosa in the Espinosa clan** of Zamboanga del Sur.
- **Hon. Donald Mirabueno Lim**- Sangguniang Kabataan Federated (1995-2002) Molave, Zambo. Sur, son of Jose Lunsing Lim, Sr.
- **Jahnene Lim Jabello**- Sangguniang Kabataan Pres., Baranggay Culo, Molave, Zambo. Sur.,grandaughter of Jose Lunsing Lim, Sr.
- **Neil Lim Capapas** - Co-Authored with Isaac Mozeson, Hidden Hebrew in the Philippines (2023); Headquarters Chief Campaign Operator Salug Valley Area and Zambo. Sur, **Senator Miguel 'Migz' Zubiri** (2013); Liberal Party HQ Zambo. Sur **President Benigno Simeon C. Aquino III** (2010); Candidate Manager Cebu Province with **Sec. Felix Guanzon (Office of the Presidential Assistant for Visayas): Senator Francis 'Kiko' Pangilinan** (2001); Campaign Staff Team Cebu Province, **Senator Raul S. Roco** (1998); Lim Family patriarch Gama Lim Ching of St. Bernard, Southern Leyte who is Fiscal Leslie Dunga Lim's father is Neil Lim Capapas 1st cousin twice removed. The Lim Family patriarch of Ozamis City Lim Eng See and Lim Eng Lian of Geegee Mall is his 1st cousin twice removed.
- **Atty. Constancia Corominas- Lim**- **Office of the Vice-President Republic of the Philippines,Legal Team**(2022-present);Mayoralty Candidate Ozamis City; **Owner of Pier 88 Liloan, Cebu, Island Central Mall, Geegee Mall Ozamis City and Topline Group Inc**. She is the Wife of Eugene Lapasaran Lim the 2nd cousin of Fiscal Leslie Dunga Kho Lim and Hon. Jose Lunsing Lim.
- **Judge Maria Alice Corominas Lim** - Ingles, Presiding Judge Br. 97, RTC, Barili, Cebu. Daughter of Atty. Constancia Corominas- Lim and Neil Lim Capapas 3rd cousin Eugene Lapasaran Lim.
- Retired **Court of Appeals Associate** **Justice Gabriel Ingles** (Son-In-Law of Atty. Constancia Corominas- Lim)
- **Senator Roseller Lim** – member of the House of Representatives (1949–1963). Court of Appeals Justice (1973–1976).
- **Gov. Jose Lim Tecson** (1971–1977) – governor of Zamboanga del Sur

=== Lim family — Palawan ===
- **Vicente Abe Lim** –municipal president (American Regime)
- **Luis Fernandez Lim** – barangay captain; vice mayor; mayor of Coron
- **Jim Gerald Lim Pe** – Sangguniang Bayan member; Provincial Board Member (Councilors' League president) and vice mayor of Coron (2013).
- **Melchor Zaldy Lim** – Sangguniang Bayan (Kabataang Barangay president) during the Marcos years
- **Nelson Reyes Lim** – Sangguniang Bayan member
- **Arthur Echague Pe** – Sangguniang Bayan member
- **Shatter Cruspero Lim** – Sangguniang Bayan member
- **Christopher Cruspero Lim** –Sangguniang Kabataan Federation president; Sangguniang Bayan member
- **Bryan Lim Palanca** – Sangguniang Kabataan Federation president
- **Fabiana Timbangcaya Lim** – Sangguniang Bayan member; barangay captain of Poblacion 5; acting mayor
- **Leo Gajardo** – Sangguniang Bayan member of Busuanga
- **Ricardo Sebastian Lim** – Kagawad, Barangay 5
- **Jocelyn Lim Alcaraz** – Kagawad, Barangay 5
- **Ricardo Cruz Uy** – Kagawad, Barangay 5 and vice president Sangguniang Kabataan Federation
- **Prime Kenneth Lim De Vera** – Kagawad, Barangay 3.

=== Lingad family — Pampanga ===
- Jose B. Lingad – governor of Pampanga from 1948 to 1951 and congressman from Pampanga from 1969 to 1972.
  - Emigdio L. Lingad – congressman for 2nd District of Pampanga from 1987 to 1995 and former member of Batasang Pambansa
- Josefo S. Lingad – mayor of Lubao from 1965 to 1968.

=== Llagas family — Baras, Rizal ===
- Renato Matignas Llagas – councilor (2001–2010; 2013–2022; 2025–present)
- Carlos de la Torre Llagas – councilor (2010–2019; 2022–present)

=== Lobregat family — Zamboanga City ===
- Pablo Lorenzo – father of Maria Clara Lobregat. mayor (1939–1940)
  - Maria Clara Lobregat – mayor (1998–2004). Mother of Celso.
    - Celso Lobregat – congressman of the Lone District and mayor.

=== Locsin family — Negros Occidental and Iloilo ===
- Jed Patrick (Locsin) E. Mabilog – mayor of Iloilo City
- Jose Locsin – senator.
- Leo Carmelo Locsin Jr. – vice mayor of Ormoc, Leyte
- Teodoro Locsin Jr. – Ambassador to the United Kingdom (2022–present), Secretary of Foreign Affairs (2018–2022), Ambassador to the United Nations (2017–2018), congressman for the 1st district of Makati (2001–2010)
- Ramon Cua Locsin
- Frankie H. Locsin – mayor of Janiuay, Iloilo
- Aurelio Lacson Locsin – mayor of Bacolod
- Leandro Locsin Rama – governor and vice governor of Negros Occidental during the American Occupation
- Raymund S. Locsin – mayor of President Roxas, Capiz

=== López family — Iloilo ===
- Benito Lopez – governor of Iloilo (1903–1908)
  - **Fernando Lopez** – 3rd and 7th **Vice President of the Philippines** (1949–1953, 1965–1972), senator (1947–1949, 1953–1965), Senate President pro tempore (1958–1965), mayor of Iloilo City (1945–1947), Secretary of Agriculture and Natural Resources (1965–1971, 1949–1953), son of Benito
    - Gina Lopez, great-niece of Fernando – Secretary of Environment and Natural Resources ad interim (2016–17), chairperson of the Pasig River Rehabilitation Commission (2010–2019)

=== Lopez family — Manila ===
- Mel Lopez – mayor of Manila (1988–1992)
  - Manny Lopez – congressman from Manila's 1st congressional district (2016–2022)
  - Alex Lopez – former mayoral candidate in 2022
  - Carlo Lopez – congressman from Manila's 2nd congressional district (2010–2019)

=== Loyola family — Cavite ===
- Sergio Loyola – representative of Manila's Third Congressional District for the House of Representatives in the Philippines (1965–1969)
- Roy Maulanin Loyola – representative of the Fifth District (2010–2019, 2022–present)
  - Dahlia Ambayec-Loyola – representative of the Fifth District (2019–2022). Wife
- Rosalie "Gigi" Batingal Loyola – municipal councilor (2004–2013), vice mayor of Silang, Cavite (2013–2016)

=== Lucero-Caparroso family — Northern Samar ===
- Clodualdo Lucero – governor, Samar (1916–1922)
- Cayetano Lucero – governor, Samar (1940–1944)
- Wilmar Lucero – congressman, Northern Samar (1992–1998)
- Antonio Lucero – vice governor, Northern Samar (2007–2010)
- Albert Lucero – board member, Northern Samar
- Glicerio Caparroso – councilor, Palapag, Northern Samar
- Jesus Caparroso Cepeda – councilor, Palapag
- Luzviminda Caparroso – councilor, San Roque, Northern Samar
- Victoriano Caparroso – councilor, San Roque

== M ==
=== Macapagal family — Camarines Sur, Pampanga and Zambales ===
- **Diosdado Macapagal** – 9th **President of the Philippines** (1961–1965)
  - Cielo Macapagal-Salgado – vice governor of Pampanga (1988–1992; 1995–1998); daughter
  - **Gloria Macapagal Arroyo** – 14th **President of the Philippines** (2001–2010); 10th **Vice President of the Philippines** (1998–2001); senator (1992–1998); representative, 2nd District of Pampanga (2010–2019, 2022–present); speaker of the House (2018–2019); daughter
    - Mikey Arroyo – representative, Ang Galing Pinoy Partylist and 2nd District of Pampanga (2004–2010); son of Gloria
    - Dato Arroyo – representative, 2nd District of Camarines Sur and 1st District of Camarines Sur (2007–2010); son of Gloria

=== Madrigal (-Collantes) family — Batangas ===
- Vicente Madrigal – senator (1945–1953)
  - Pacita Madrigal-Warns – senator (1955–1961)
  - Manuel Collantes – Mambabatas Pambansa (assemblyman) (1984–1986)
  - Jamby Madrigal – Undersecretary of Social Welfare and Development (1992–1998), presidential adviser for children's affairs (1999–2001), senator (2004–2010)

=== Magsaysay family — Zambales, La Union ===
- Vicente Magsaysay – governor of Zambales (1967–1986, 1998–2007), Mambabatas Pambansa, Region III (1978–1984)
  - Angelica Magsaysay-Cheng – vice governor of Zambales (2016–2019) – daughter of Vicente;
  - Mitos Magsaysay – daughter-in-law of Vicente; member of the House of Representatives from Zambales' 1st District (2004–2013)
  - **Ramon Magsaysay** – 7th **President of the Philippines** (1953–1957); member of the House of Representatives from Zambales' Lone District (1946–1950)
    - Ramon Magsaysay Jr. – member of the House of Representatives from Zambales' Lone District (1965–1969), senator (1995–2007)
  - Genaro Magsaysay – member of the House of Representatives from Zambales' Lone District (1957–1959), senator (1959–1965, 1965–1971, 1971–1973)
    - Eulogio "Amang" Magsaysay – son of Genaro; Party-list representative
  - Antonio Magsaysay Diaz – nephew of Ramon Sr.; member of the House of Representatives from the 2nd District of Zambales
  - Milagros Aquino Magsaysay – cousin of Ramon Jr.; 2nd Nominee, Senior Citizens Partylist
    - Miguel Corleone "Migz" B. Magsaysay – grandson of Milagros; councilor of San Juan, La Union (2013–present)

=== Maliksi family — Cavite ===
- Erineo "Ayong" Maliksi – chairman, Philippine Charity Sweepstakes Office (PCSO), representative of the 3rd District (2010–2013) and the 2nd District (1998–2001); governor (2001–2010); mayor of Imus (1988–1998)
  - Emmanuel L. Maliksi – mayor of Imus (2007–2010; 2011–2013; 2013–present), son of Erineo

=== Mangudadatu family — Sultan Kudarat and Maguindanao del Sur ===
- Sultan Pax S. Mangudadatu – mayor of Lutayan, governor of Sultan Kudarat and congressman of 1st District of Sultan Kudarat
- Suharto T. Mangudadatu – mayor, congressman and governor of Sultan Kudarat
- Bing Mangudadatu – mayor of Lutayan
- Raden Sakaluran – congressman of 1st district of SK – son-in-law of Pax
- Esmael Mangudadatu – mayor of Buluan, board member of Maguindanao and governor of Maguindanao (2010–2019), and member of the House of Representatives (2019–2022) – nephew of Pax
- Ibrahim Mangudadatu – mayor of Buluan
- Freddie Mangudadatu – mayor of Mangudadatu, Maguindanao del Sur
- Khadafeh Mangudadatu – mayor of Pandag, assemblyman of ARMM
- King Jazzer Mangudadatu – vice mayor of Buluan
- Prince Dilangalen – vice mayor of Pandag
- Bai Elizabeth Mangudadatu – ABC president of Mangudadatu
- Bai Gina Mangudadatu – ABC president of Buluan

=== Manrique family — Boac, Marinduque and Oriental Mindoro ===
- Pacito "Cito" Manrique, Cabeza de Barangay
  - Andres Manrique – municipal councilor
  - Ciriaco Manrique – vice mayor, municipal councilor
    - Asuncion Manrique-Mantaring – councilor (Bongabong, Oriental Mindoro), daughter of Ciriaco
      - Mervin Mantaring-vicedo – barangay councilor (Bongabong, Oriental Mindoro), grandson of Asuncion
    - Celestino M. Manrique – municipal councilor (1971–1986), son of Ciriaco
      - Justin Angelo J. Manrique – SK chairman, Barangay Tampus (2018–present), grandson of Celestino
    - Antonio S. Manrique – municipal councilor, cousin of Celestino

=== Marcoleta family — Tarlac and Rizal ===
- Rodante Marcoleta – representative, Alagad (2004–2013); representative, SAGIP (2013–2025); senator (2025–present)
  - Paolo Marcoleta – son of Rodante; representative, SAGIP (2025–present)

=== Marcos family — Ilocos Norte, Manila and Leyte ===
- Mariano Marcos – representative, 2nd district, Ilocos Norte (1925–1931)
  - **Ferdinand Edralin Marcos Sr.** – 10th **President of the Philippines** (1965–1986); prime minister of the Philippines (1978–1981); senator (1959–1965); representative, 2nd district, Ilocos Norte (1949–1959)
    - **Imelda Marcos** – **First Lady of the Philippines** (1965–1986); representative, 2nd district, Ilocos Norte (2010–2019); representative, 1st district, Leyte (1995–1998); Mambabatas Pambansa, Region IV-A (1978–1984); governor, Metropolitan Manila (1975–1986)
    - Imee Marcos – senator (2019–present); governor, Ilocos Norte (2010–2019); representative, 2nd district, Ilocos Norte (1998–2007); assemblyman, Ilocos Norte (1984–1986)
      - Matthew Manotoc – governor, Ilocos Norte (2019–present); board member, 2nd district, Ilocos Norte (2016–2019)
    - **Bongbong Marcos** – 17th **President of the Philippines** (2022–present); senator (2010–2016); representative, 2nd district, Ilocos Norte (1992–1995, 2007–2010); governor, Ilocos Norte (1983–1986, 1998–2007); vice governor, Ilocos Norte (1980–1983)
      - Sandro Marcos – representative, 1st District, Ilocos Norte (2022–present)
  - Elizabeth Marcos-Keon – governor, Ilocos Norte (1971–1983)
    - Michael Marcos Keon – mayor, Laoag (2019–present); governor, Ilocos Norte (2007–2010), board member of Ilocos Norte (2004–2007)
  - Angelo Marcos Barba – grandson of Mariano; representative, 2nd district, Ilocos Norte (2019–present); vice governor (2010–2019); board member (2001–2010); mayor (1992–2001)

=== Masigan family — Isabela ===
- Buenaventura G. Masigan – mayor, Santa Maria
- Elvin U. Masigan – mayor, Santa Maria
- Oscar U. Masigan – mayor, Santa Maria (1972–1998)
- Miriam S. Masigan-Martinez – mayor, Santa Maria (1998–2007)
- Davis Omar S. Masigan – mayor, Santa Maria (2007–2013)
- Gilbert Masigan – mayor, Santa Maria (2013–2016)
- Danilo S. Masigan – vice mayor, Santa Maria (2016–2022)
- Regal Masigan – councilor, Santa Maria (2013–2016)
- Carol Balabbo-Masigan – councilor, Santa Maria (2022–present)
- Derek Alain S. Masigan – Punong Barangay and president of Liga ng mga Barangay, Santa Maria Chapter (2010–2013)
- Oliver U. Masigan – OIC mayor, Cabagan (1986–1988)
- Lovier V. Masigan – councilor (2007–2016); vice mayor, Cabagan (2016–present)

=== Mastura family — Maguindanao del Norte ===
- Datu Tucao O. Mastura – mayor, Sultan Kudarat (1977–2007; 2010–2013); governor of Shariff Kabunsuan (2007–2010)
- Datu Michael O. Mastura – member of the House of Representatives, congressman from Maguindanao's First District and Cotabato City (1987–1995); delegate to the 1971 Constitutional Convention
- Datu Armando Mastura – mayor, Sultan Mastura (2003–2013)
- Datu Ismael V. Mastura – vice governor, Maguindanao (2010–2013); board member of Shariff Kabunsuan (2007–2010) (son of Michael)
- Datu Ishak V. Mastura – deputy executive secretary, ARMM; Secretary of the DTI ARMM (son of Michael)
- Datu Sharifudin Tucao P. Mastura – Sangguniang Kabataan Federation vice president, Sultan Kudarat (2010–present) (son of Tucao)
- Bai Shajida B. Mastura – mayor, Sultan Kudarat (2007–2010) (daughter of Tucao)
- Datu Shameem B. Mastura – mayor, Sultan Kudarat (2013) (grandson of Tucao, son of Bai Shajida)
- Datu Rauf Mastura – mayor, Sultan Mastura (2013) (son of Armando)
- Bai Norhaina Mastura – vice mayor, Sultan Kudarat (2013) (daughter of Tucao)

=== Matalam family — Maguindanao del Sur ===
- Datu Udtog Matalam – governor of Cotabato (1946–1949, 1956–1957)
- Guimid Matalam – congressman of the 2nd District of Maguindanao (1987–1992, 2001–2004); vice governor of ARMM
- Norodin Matalam – governor of Maguindanao (1990–1995)
- Udtog Matalam Jr. – mayor of Pagalungan
- Jambo Matalam – member of the Bangsamoro Parliament

=== Matba family – Tawi-Tawi and Agusan del Norte ===
- Rashidin Matba – representative, Tawi-Tawi
  - Ma Angelica Rosedell Amante Matba – Agusan del Norte 2nd district, wife of Rashidin.

=== Mathay family ===
- Ismael Mathay – budget secretary
  - Mel Mathay – mayor
    - Chuck Mathay – congressman
      - Cris Mathay – councilor
      - Macky Mathay – councilor

=== Mendiola/Siojo/Mercado family — Bulacan, Pampanga, Mindoro, Samar ===
- Alfredo Lim – senator (2004–2007), mayor of Manila (1992–1998, 2007–2013), Director of the National Bureau of Investigation (1989–1992)
- Miguel Siojo – municipal president of San Miguel de Mayumo, Bulacan (1908–1912)
- Felipe Siojo Buencamino Sr. – member of the Malolos Congress
- Marcelo Dungca Mendiola – mayor of Floridablanca, Pampanga (1956–1959), Clerk of Court of Pampanga, son of Felix Mendiola Sr., a cousin of Alfredo
- Jose Dungca Mendiola – mayor of Floridablanca, Pampanga (1968–1971), brother of Marcelo Mendiola, grandson of Marcela Mendiola and revolutionary leader Felipe Buencamino
- Tito Morales Mendiola – mayor of Floridablanca, Pampanga (1986–1992), PhilHealth vice president, son of Marcelo
- Felmar "Jojo" Mendiola – councilor of Floridablanca, Pampanga (2004–present), grandson of Marcelo
- Martin S. Mercado – municipal president of Minalin, Pampanga (1907–1910)
- Simplicio Tolentino-Mendiola – capitan municipal (1881) of Kuliat (now Angeles City)
- Mario "Gene" Mendiola – mayor of San Jose, Occidental Mindoro and vice governor of Occidental Mindoro
- Pedro T. Mendiola Sr. – congressman of Occidental Mindoro
- Benito de Mendiola – alcalde-mayor of Pampanga (c. 1598)
- Pedro Muñoz de Mendiola – captain and sargento-mayor in the royal camp of Manila (c. 1627) and governor of Moluccas 1636–1640
- Pedro Mendiola – representative of Samar (1916–1922)

=== Mendoza family — Cotabato ===
- Democrito Mendoza – founder of the country's labor movement
  - Raymond Mendoza – congressman, son
    - Emmylou Mendoza – governor, wife
      - Maria Alana Samantha Santos – congresswoman, daughter

=== Mindalano family — Lanao del Sur and Lanao del Norte ===
- Amir Mindalano – congressman of the lone district of Lanao (now split into Lanao del Norte and Lanao del Sur)
- Dagoran A. Mindalano – mayor of Madamba, Lanao del Sur (2016, 2019–2021)
- Omeraidah S. Mindalano – mayor of Madalum, Lanao del Sur (2019–2021)

=== Mitra family — Palawan ===
- Ramon V. Mitra – senator (1971–1972), speaker of the House of Representatives (1987–1992), representative (1965–1971, 1984–1986, 1987–1992)
  - Ramon Mitra III – candidate for the 2010 and 2013 General Elections
  - Abraham Kahlil B. Mitra – governor (2010–2013) and representative, 2nd District (2001–2010)

=== Montano family — Cavite ===
- Justiniano Montano – senator, majority leader of the House of Representatives, representative
- Delfin Nazareno Montano – governor of Cavite

== N ==
=== Nepomuceno family — Angeles City ===
- Pio Rafael Nepomuceno y Villaseñor – Gobernadorcillo (mayor) of Angeles, in 1852
  - Juan Gualberto Nepomuceno y Henson (son of Pio Rafael) – Gobernadorcillo of Angeles (1879–1880); Presidente Municipal (mayor) of Angeles, (1898–1899); Delegate to the Malolos Congress, (1898–1899)
    - Juan de Dios Nepomuceno y Parás (son of Juan Gualberto) – municipal president, Angeles (1922–1928); municipal councilor, Angeles (1928–1937)
      - Geromin Pedro G. Nepomuceno (son of Juan de Dios) – councilor, Angeles
    - Ricardo Nepomuceno y Parás (son of Juan Gualberto) – municipal councilor, Angeles (1919–1928); municipal president, Angeles (1928–1931); board member (1931–1937)
- Francisco 'Quitong' G. Nepomuceno – governor, congressman and city mayor of Angeles
- Juanita 'Saning' L. Nepomuceno – governor, assemblywoman, congresswoman
  - Francis "Blueboy" L. Nepomuceno – mayor of Angeles (2007–2010) and vice mayor (1995–1998); representative, 1st District (1998–2007)
  - Robin "Bombing" L. Nepomuceno – board member (1980–1986), vice governor (1986–1987), ABC president/city councilor, barangay captain of Cutcut, Angeles
  - Cecilia C. Nepomuceno – Punong Barangay, Cutcut, Angeles; wife of Bombing
    - Bryan Matthew C. Nepomuceno – vice mayor, Angeles (2016–2019); councilor, Angeles (2010–2016)

=== Ner family - Cavite ===
- Lino M. Ner – mayor of Rosario, Cavite (1855–1856, 1863–1864, 1867–1868, 1875–1877)
  - Andres Q. Ner – son of Lino, mayor of Rosario, Cavite (1901–1905)
    - Narciso J. Ner – son of Andres, mayor of Rosario, Cavite (1930–1934, 1945)

=== Nicart family - Eastern Samar ===
- Thelma Nicart – mayor of San Policarpo, Eastern Samar (2019–2022), vice mayor of San Policarpo, Eastern Samar (2022–present)
- Conrado Nicart Jr. – governor of Eastern Samar (2010–2016)
  - Conrado Nicart III – mayor of San Policarpo, Eastern Samar (2006–2017, 2022–present)
- Paz Nicart – vice mayor of San Policarpo, Eastern Samar (2019–2022)
- Bonifacio Nicart – councilor of San Policarpo, Eastern Samar (2022–present

=== Nicolas Family - Bulacan ===
- Ricardo Nicolas Sr. - Mayor Sta. Maria, Bulacan (1956-1959), Mayor Sta. Maria, Bulacan (1964-1967),
- Ricardo "Dick" Nicolas Jr. - Mayor Sta. Maria, Bulacan (1972-1978), Mayor Sta. Maria (1978-1986), Vice governor Bulacan (1986-1989)
- Reylina "Neneng" nicolas - Board member, 4th provincial district, Mayor Sta. Maria, Bulacan (1992-2001), Congresswoman 4th provincial district, Province of Bulacan (2001-2004), Congresswoman 4th provincial district( 2004-2007), Congresswoman 4th provincial district (2007-2010)
- Edward "Ding dong" Nicolas - Municipal Councilor, Board member - 2nd provincial district
- Kirk "Kiko" Nicolas - City councilor Sangguniang panlungsod, Bulacan
- Myron Nicolas - Municipal councilor, Bulacan, Provincial SK federation president Bulacan, Board member Bulacan

=== Nograles family — Davao City ===
- Prospero Nograles – representative, 1st District, Davao City (1989–1992, 1995–1998, 2001–2010)
  - Karlo Nograles – representative, 1st District, Davao City (2010–2018)
  - Jericho Nograles – representative of PBA Partylist (2016–2022)
  - Migs Nograles – representative of PBA Partylist (2022–2025)

=== Noriel-Joson family — Nueva Ecija ===
- Eduardo "Tatang" Joson – governor (1960–1986, 1988–1990)
  - Tomas "Tommy" Noriel Joson III – governor (1992–1995)
  - Eduardo Nonato Joson – assemblyman (1984–1986), governor (1995–1998), congressman of the 1st District (1987–1992, 2007–2010)
  - Mariano Cristino "Boyet" Noriel Joson – mayor of Quezon (1998–2001, 2016–present), vice governor (2004–2007)
  - Eduardo Danding Joson III – vice mayor of Cabanatuan (1980–1989)
  - Eduardo "Ding Liit" Noriel Joson IV – vice governor (2001–2004)
  - Josefina Manuel-Joson – congresswoman of 1st District (1998–2007, 2010–2013)
  - Edward Thomas Filart Joson – vice governor (2007–2010)
  - Eduardo Basilio "Dale" Joson – mayor of Quezon (2001–?)
  - Mariano Noriel "Dean" Joson – mayor of Quezon (2013–2016), vice mayor (2016–present)
  - Eduardo Jose Ballesteros Joson VII – board member, 3rd District (2019–present), vice mayor of Cabanatuan (2018–2019), city councilor (2013–2018)

== O ==
=== Oaminal family — Misamis Occidental ===
- Henry S. Oaminal Sr. – governor (2022–present); congressman, Second District (2013–2022)
  - Sancho Fernando "Ando" F. Oaminal, congressman, Second District (2022–present); mayor of Ozamiz (2019–2022). Son of Henry Sr.
  - Henry "Indy" F. Oaminal Jr., representative of Asenso Pinoy partylist (2025–present); mayor of Ozamiz (2022–2025). Son of Henry Sr.
- Sancho S. Oaminal, city councilor of Ozamiz, brother of Henry Sr.

=== Olivarez family — Parañaque and Laguna ===
- Pablo Olivarez – mayor of Parañaque (1992–1995); barangay chairman of San Dionisio (2010–present)
  - Edwin Olivarez – son of Pablo; vice governor of Laguna (2004–2007); representative of the 1st District of Parañaque (2010–2013, 2022–present), mayor of Parañaque (2013–2022)
  - Eric Olivarez – son of Pablo; councilor, Parañaque (2004–2013), representative of the 1st District of Parañaque (2013–2022), mayor of Parañaque (2022–present)
  - Evangeline Olivarez – daughter of Pablo; elected barangay chairman of San Dionisio
  - Shanine Olivarez – daughter of Pablo; SK chairperson of Barangay San Dionisio, Parañaque (2010–2013), councilor of Barangay San Dionisio, Parañaque (2013–present)

=== Ortega family — La Union ===
- Joaquin Ortega – governor (1901–1904)
  - Joaquin L. Ortega Jr. – son of Joaquin, councilor, provincial board member, representative of the 1st District to the 7th Congress (1969–1972) and Batasang Pambansa (1978–1986) and governor (1988–1992)
  - Francisco L. Ortega – son of Joaquin, representative of the 1st District to the 10th Philippine Legislature (1934–1935), 3rd National Assembly (1941–1946), 3rd (1953–1957), 4th (1957–1961), and 5th Congress (1961–1965), councilor and mayor of San Fernando
    - Victor Francisco Ortega – son of Francisco Sr; representative of the 1st District to the 14th Congress, representative (1987–1998), and governor (2001–2007)
      - Mary Jane Ortega – wife of Victor, mayor of San Fernando (1998–2007)
    - Manuel Ortega – son of Francisco Sr; governor, representative of the 1st District (1998–2007)
      - Alfredo Pablo R. Ortega – son of Manuel, councilor of San Fernando
      - Jennifer Joan O. Manquiat – daughter of Manuel; his chief political affairs officer at the House of Representatives
      - Francisco R. Ortega III – son of Manuel; provincial board member (1998–2001) and councilor (2001–2007) of San Fernando, governor (2016–2022)
        - Raphaelle Ortega-David – daughter of Francisco III; governor (2022–present)
    - Pablo C. Ortega – son of Francisco Sr; mayor of San Fernando, councilor (1998–2001), provincial board member (2001–2004) and councilor (2004–2007)
      - Paolo Ortega – congressman
    - Mario C. Ortega – barangay captain of San Fernando
    - Roberto C. Ortega – son of Francisco Sr; councilor, Baguio (1995–2001, 2013–2017)
      - Roberto Ortega Jr. – son of Robert, councilor of Manila (1998–2007, 2010–2019)
    - Francisco C. Ortega Jr. – son of Francisco Sr; councilor of San Fernando (2001–2007)
    - Jose Maria C. Ortega – son of Francisco Sr; barangay chairman in Bauang; provincial board member (2004–2007)
    - Ramon C. Ortega – son of Francisco Sr; executive assistant of the city government of San Fernando
    - Mario Lacsamana – nephew of Manuel; councilor, San Fernando (2001–2007)
  - Justo O. Orros Jr. – cousin of Manuel; governor (1992–2001) and ambassador to Mexico, grandson of Joaquin
  - Jonathan Justo Orros – son of Justo Jr; provincial board member (2001–2007)
  - John Orros – nephew of Manuel; councilor of San Fernando (2001–2007)
  - Joaquin T. Kining Ortega – son of Jose (Pepe), son of Joaquin Ortega – vice mayor, mayor, provincial board member, administrator and vice chairman of National Tobacco Administration, appointed presidential consultant on agriculture to President Fidel Ramos
    - Tomas Joaquin B. Ortega (TJ) – son of Joaquin "Kining" Ortega, municipal councilor of Bacnotan
    - Josemari B. Ortega (Joey) – municipal council secretary 2004–2007, San Fernando

=== Osmeña family — Cebu ===
- Severino Osmeña y Agatón (?–c. 1860) — Businessman and progenitor of the Osmeña clan. He adopted the surname Osmeña following the 1849 decree of colonial Governor-General Narciso Clavería y Zaldúa.
  - Juana Osmeña y Suico — (daughter of Severino and first wife Paula Suico, 1858–1941)
    - **Sergio Osmeña Sr.** (1878–1961) — 4th President of the Philippines (1944–1946), 1st Vice President of the Philippines (1935–1944), senator (1922–1935), speaker of the House of Representatives (1916–1922) and National Assembly (1907–1916), Cebu 2nd District representative (1907–1922), and governor of Cebu (1904–1907)
      - Edilberto Veloso Osmeña
        - Renato Veloso Osmeña Sr. (1940–2014) — 15th vice mayor of Cebu City (1998–2001) and Cebu City councilor
          - Renato "Junjun" Zayco Osmeña Jr. (b. 1964) — PAGCOR executive and Cebu City councilor (2017–2025)
          - Richard "Richie" Zayco Osmeña (b. 1972) — Cebu City councilor (2007–2016) and LTFRB Western Visayas director (2017–present)
        - Rogelio "Jingjing" Veloso Osmeña (1941–2010) — Cebu City councilor (1995–2001)
          - Rogelio "RJ" Galan Osmeña Jr. (b. 1981) — candidate for Cebu City councilor (2025)
        - Antonio Veloso Osmena
          - Ian Anthony Tiengo Osmeña (b. 1981) — candidate for Cebu City councilor (2025)
      - Emilio Veloso Osmeña (1906–1942) — doctor and USAFFE lieutenant colonel, executed by the Japanese occupation
        - John Henry "Sonny" Renner Osmeña (1935–2021) — senator (1971–1972; 1987–1995; 1998–2004), Cebu 2nd District (1969–1971) and 3rd District representative (1995–1998), and mayor of Toledo City (2010–2019)
          - John Gregory "John-John" Urgello Osmeña (b. 1970–1971) — 14th vice governor of Cebu (2001–2004); gubernatorial candidate (2004)
        - Emilio Mario "Lito" Renner Osmeña (1938–2021) — 21st governor of Cebu (1988–1992); presidential (1998), vice-presidential (1992), and senatorial candidate (2010)
          - Mariano "Mimo" Versoza Osmeña (b. 1961) — PROMDI party president
      - Sergio "Serging" Veloso Osmeña Jr. (1916–1984) — senator (1965–1971), governor of Cebu (1951–1955), Cebu 2nd District representative (1957–1961), and mayor of Cebu City (1955–1957; 1959–1960; 1963–1965; 1967–1968)
        - Sergio "Serge" de la Rama Osmeña III (b. 1943) — senator (1995–2007, 2010–2016)
        - Tomas "Tommy" de la Rama Osmeña (b. 1948) — vice mayor of Cebu City (2025–present), 24th mayor of Cebu City (1988–1995; 2001–2010; 2016–2019), and Cebu City 2nd (South) District representative (2010–2013)
          - Margarita "Margot" Vargas Osmeña (wife of Tomas, b. 1949) — acting mayor of Cebu City (2016) and Cebu City councilor (2010–2019)
          - Ana Gabriela Beatriz "Bea" Villegas Osmeña (daughter-in-law of Tomas) — 2022 Cebu City councilor candidate
        - Georgia dela Rama Osmeña — candidate for mayor of Cebu City (2010)
  - Victoriano Osmeña y Rita (son of Severino and second wife Vicenta Rita)
    - Juanita Osmeña Climaco
      - Arsenio Veloso Climaco (husband of Juanita, 1870–1952) — 6th governor of Cebu (1923–1930), 7th municipal president of Cebu (1913–1916)
  - Eduviges Osmeña-Espina (daughter of Severino and second wife Vicenta Rita)
    - Harriolfo Osmeña Espina
      - Luis Veloso Espina — Cebu Provincial Board member (1948), 6th mayor of Cebu City (1947), and doctor
      - Visitacion Espina-Urgello
        - Vicente Urgello (husband of Visitacion, 1875–1952) — Cebu 3rd District representative (1916–1922)
      - Remedios Espina-Noel
        - Bayson Noel (husband of Remedios) — Cebu 6th District representative (1925–1928) and pastor
      - Soledad Espina-Ybáñez
        - Antonio Barcenilla Ybáñez (husband of Soledad, 1896–?) — delegate to the 1934 Constitutional Convention and lawyer

=== Ouano family — Cebu ===
- Alfredo "Ingkoy Pedong" Mendoza Ouano (1924–2014) — 16th mayor of Mandaue City (1988–1998), vice mayor of Mandaue (1972–1986), and Mandaue City Councilor (1956–1965)
  - Thadeo "Teddy" Zambo Ouano (1944–2016) — 6th District provincial board member (2010–2016) and 17th mayor of Mandaue City (1998–2007)
    - Emmarie Dolores "Lolypop" Mabanag Ouano-Dizon (born 1970) — 14th Cebu 6th District Representative (2019–2022), 1st Mandaue City Lone District Representative (2022–present), and Mandaue City councilor (2010–2016)
      - Nixon "Jojo" Dizon (husband of Lolypop) — barangay captain of Opao, Mandaue (2023–present)
    - Thadeo Jovito "Jonkie" Mabanag Ouano (born 1974) — 22nd mayor of Mandaue City (2025–present) and 6th District provincial board member (2016–2025)
    - Alfred Francis "Alfie" Mabanag Ouano (born 1972) — 6th District provincial board member (2025–present) and Consolacion municipal councilor (2016–2025)
  - Basiliza Ouano-Icalina — barangay captain of Opao, Mandaue
    - Andreo "Anjong" Ouano Icalina (born 1987) — Mandaue City councilor (2019–2025) and barangay captain of Opao, Mandaue

== P ==
=== Pacquiao family — General Santos, Sarangani ===
- Manny Pacquiao – member of the House of Representatives from Sarangani's at-large congressional district (2010–2016), senator (2016–2022)
  - Jinkee Pacquiao, wife of Manny – vice governor of Sarangani (2013–2016)
    - Michael Pacquiao, son of Manny – councilor of General Santos (2025–present)
- Bobby Pacquiao – member of the House of Representatives from OFW Family Club Partylist (2019–2022); city councilor of General Santos. Brother of Manny.
  - Lorelie Pacquiao, wife of Bobby – mayor of General Santos (2022–present); chairwoman of Barangay Labangal, General Santos
- Rogelio Pacquiao – member of the House of Representatives from Sarangani's lone district (2016–2022), governor (2022–present). Brother of Manny.

=== Padilla family — Bulacan, Camarines Norte and Nueva Ecija ===
- José Padilla Sr. – representative from Bulacan's 1st congressional district (1919–1928), 12th and 14th Governor of Bulacan (1928–1931, 1934–1937)
  - Roy Padilla Sr. – son of José; Governor of Camarines Norte (1986–1988), member of the Regular Batasang Pambansa representing Camarines Norte (1984–1986)
    - Roy Padilla Jr. – son of Roy Sr.; Governor of Camarines Norte (1988–1998), former vice governor of Camarines Norte, representative from Camarines Norte's at-large congressional district (1998–2001)
    - Ricarte "Dong" Padilla – son of Roy Sr.; Governor of Camarines Norte (2022–present), former mayor of Jose Panganiban, Camarines Norte
    - Ronnie Padilla – son of Roy Sr.; former mayor of Jose Panganiban
    - Roger Padilla – son of Roy Sr.; former mayor of Jose Panganiban
    - Rommel Padilla – son of Roy Sr.; board member of Nueva Ecija (2007–2010; 2016–2019)
    - Robin Padilla – son of Roy Sr.; senator (2022–present)
    - Kuatro Padilla – vice mayor (2022–present)
    - Jeroy Padilla – councilor (2022–present)

=== Padua family — Pasay ===
- Rey Padua Sr. – councilor, 2nd district (1995–2001, 2001–2006, 2007–2016)
  - Irish Padua – councilor (2001–2006, 2007–2010)
  - Aileen Padua-Lopez – councilor, 2nd District (2013–present)

=== Palacio family — Batangas ===
- Pedro M. Palacio Jr. – mayor, Calatagan (1995–1997), OIC mayor (1986)
  - Peter Oliver M. Palacio – mayor, Calatagan (1998–2007) (2016–2025)
    - Sophia G. Palacio – mayor, Calatagan (2007–2016)
    - Czarina Patricia G. Palacio – Sangguniang Kabataan Federation president, Calatagan (2010–2013)
  - Theresa Palacio Pelea – councilor, Calatagan (2016–2025)
- Edna Palacio Alaras – councilor, Balayan

=== Pamintuan family — Angeles City ===
- Edgardo Pamintuan Sr. – mayor of Angeles City (2010–2019; 1992–1998)
  - Edu Pamintuan – councilor of Angeles City (2022–present; 2010–2019)

=== Pardo de Tavera family — Manila ===
- Trinidad Pardo de Tavera – member of the Malolos Congress
  - Mita Pardo de Tavera – secretary of social welfare and development

=== Paulino family — Olongapo ===
- Rolen Paulino – mayor of Olongapo (2013–2019), vice mayor of Olongapo (2010–2013)
- Rolen Paulino Jr. – mayor of Olongapo (2019–present)
- Cristabelle Marie "Tata" Paulino – councilor of Olongapo (2022–present)

=== Peralta family — Pangasinan ===
- Macario Peralta – senator of the Philippines (1949–1955)
- Felipe Orallo Peralta – mayor of Balungao (1946–1947; 1952–1955)
  - Jose Corpuz Peralta Sr. – vice mayor of Balungao (1972–1980), mayor (1980–1993)
    - Jose de Guzman Peralta Jr. – councilor of Balungao (1993–1995), barangay captain of Poblacion (1995–1998), vice mayor (1998–2001), mayor (2001–2010), board member of the Sixth District (2010–2013), barangay captain of Pugaro (2013–2020)
      - Minda Tambio-Peralta, vice mayor of Balungao (2010–2019) wife of Jose Jr.
      - Jose Tambio Peralta III – councilor of Balungao (2016–present)
    - Philipp de Guzman Peralta – councilor of Balungao (2004–2007), vice mayor (2007–2010; 2019–present), mayor (2010–2019)
      - Maria Theresa Rodriguez-Peralta, mayor of Balungao (2019–present) wife of Philipp

=== Petilla–Veloso–Loreto–Cari family — Leyte, Iloilo ===
- Juanita Veloso — married Anastacio Loreto
  - Eriberto Veloso Loreto — congressman (1987–1998), mayor of Baybay (1964–1979)
    - Ma. Catalina Loreto-Go — congresswoman, Leyte 5th District (1998–2001)
  - Jose Veloso Loreto — mayor of Baybay (1980–1986), member of Leyte Provincial Board
    - Asuncion Petilla Loreto (wife of Jose; sister of Leopoldo Petilla Sr.) — member of Board of Directors of the Philippine Postal Corporation
      - Carlos "Carlo" Petilla Loreto — vice governor of Leyte (2013–2022), member of the Leyte Provincial Board (2004–2013, 2022–present)
      - Janette Petilla Loreto-Garin — deputy speaker of the House of Representatives (2025–present), Secretary of Health (2015–2016), congresswoman for Iloilo 1st District (2004–2013, 2019–present), member of the Leyte Provincial Board (by marriage part of the Garin family)
        - Oscar "Richard" S. Garin Jr. (husband of Janette) — mayor of Miagao (2022–present), congressman for Iloilo 1st District (2013–2019), vice governor of Iloilo (2010–2013), member of the Sangguniang Panlalawigan of Iloilo from the 1st District (1992–1998, 2007–2010), mayor of Guimbal (1998–2007)
  - Carmen Veloso Loreto Cari — congresswoman for Leyte 5th District (2001–2010), mayor of Baybay (1988–1998, 2010–2019), member of the Leyte Provincial Board (2022–present)
    - Jose Carlos Loreto Cari — congressman, Leyte 5th District (2010–2019), mayor of Baybay (1998–2007, 2019–present)
      - Ma. Margarita C. Cari (wife of Jose Carlos) — ABC president of Baybay City, member of the Leyte Provincial Board (2010–2016)
        - Carl Nicolas C. Cari — congressman, Leyte 5th District (2019–present)
    - Michael Loreto Cari — mayor of Baybay (2007–2010), vice mayor of Baybay (2010–2019), member of the Leyte Provincial Board (2022–present), ABC president of Baybay (1996–2004)
  - Remedios Veloso Loreto Petilla — governor of Leyte (1995–2004), congresswoman for Leyte 1st District (2004–2007), chair of the RDC - Region VIII Eastern Visayas (2001–2004), mayor of Palo (2010–2019, 2022–present), vice president of PAGCOR (2007–2010), president of IBC-13 (2007–2010)
    - Leopoldo Petilla Sr. (husband of Remedios) — governor of Leyte (acting, 1988–1992; elected, 1992–1995), vice governor of Leyte (1988)
      - Jericho Petilla — Secretary of Energy (2012–2015), governor of Leyte (2004–2012, 2022–present), chair of the RDC - Region VIII Eastern Visayas (2011–2013)
        - Frances Ann B. Petilla (wife of Jericho) — mayor of Palo (2019–2022)
      - Leopoldo Dominico Petilla — governor of Leyte (2013–2022), chair of the RDC - Region VIII Eastern Visayas (2013–2016, 2020–2022)
- Domingo Veloso (brother of Juanita) — congressman, Leyte 2nd District (1946–1957)

==== Other Members ====
- Jose Maria Veloso — senator (1916–1919, 1925–1935), governor of Leyte (1912–1916, 1919–1922), congressman for Leyte (1922–1925, 1945–1946), member of the National Assembly (1935–1938, 1943–1944)
  - Concepcion Veloso — married Eduardo Romualdez (Secretary of Finance, 1966–1970; Ambassador to the United States, 1971–1982) (by marriage part of the Romualdez family)
- Juan Veloso — congressman, Leyte 1st District (1925–1928)
- Marcelino Veloso — congressman, Leyte 1st District (1957–1961); congressman, Leyte 3rd District (1961–1972)
  - Eduardo Veloso — congressman, Leyte 3rd District (1998–2007)
- Alberto Veloso — congressman, Leyte 3rd District (1978–1986); congressman, Leyte 3rd District (1987–1998) (cousin of Eduardo Veloso; half-brother of Vicente Veloso III)
- Vicente Veloso III — congressman, Leyte 3rd District (2016–2022), Court of Appeals justice (former)
  - Anna Victoria Veloso-Tuazon — congresswoman, Leyte 3rd District (2022–present)
  - Marie Kathryn Veloso-Kabigting — member of the Leyte Provincial Board (2022–present)
- Remedio B. Veloso — mayor of San Isidro (2019–present)
- Jorge Veloso — mayor of Villaba (1992–1998, 2013–2016, 2019–2022)
- Carlos G. Veloso — mayor of Villaba (2022–present)
- Eriberto A. Loreto — mayor of Baybay (1906–1907)
- Serfain Loreto — mayor of Baybay (1912–1915, 1935–1939)
- Marilyn Veloso de Leon — mayor of Baybay (1986–1987)
- Ma. Cleofe Veloso — mayor of Baybay (1987)

=== Piccio family — Negros Occidental, Antique, Iloilo ===
- Eladio Piccio Araneta – Passi, Iloilo auxiliary justice of the peace
- Edmundo S. Piccio – Court of Appeals associate justice (appointed 1958)
- Ernesto Piccio – Sagay, Negros Occidental councilor (1955–1958)
- Vicente Mondéjar Piccio – Belison, Antique mayor (2007–2009)
  - Vicente Hernández Piccio – Antique Provincial Board member
  - Vincent Bernard Hernández Piccio – Belison mayor
  - Christopher Hernández Piccio – Belison mayor

=== Pimentel family — Cagayan de Oro ===
- Aquilino Pimentel Jr. – 1971 Constitutional Convention delegate, mayor (1980–1984), Mambabatas Pambansa (assemblyman) (1984–1986), senator (1987–1992, 1998–2010)
  - Aquilino Pimentel III – National Youth Commissioner for Mindanao (1996–1998), senator (2011–present)

=== Pimentel family — Surigao del Sur ===
- Vicente Pimentel Jr. – former governor
  - Vicente VJ Pimentel III – son of Vicente Pimentel Jr., current mayor of Carrascal
- Alexander Pimentel – brother of Vicente Pimentel Jr., current governor
  - Roxanne Pimentel – wife of Alexander, current mayor of Tandag
- Johnny Pimentel – brother of Vicente Pimentel Jr., current 2nd district representative
- Roger Pimentel – former mayor of Tago
  - Betty Pimentel – wife of Roger, current mayor of Tago

=== Pineda family — Pampanga ===
- Lilia Pineda – governor (2010–2019), mayor of Lubao (1992–2004), provincial board member
  - Dennis Pineda – governor (2019–present), vice governor (2013–2019), mayor of Lubao (2004–2010), president of Pampanga's mayors League
    - Yolanda Miranda Pineda – wife of Dennis; mayor of Santa Rita (2007–2016)
  - Mylyn Pineda-Cayabyab – mayor of Lubao (2010–2019), provincial board member (2019–2024)
  - Esmeralda Pineda – mayor of Lubao (2019–present)
    - Jayson Pineda Victorino – son of Esmeralda; councilor of Lubao (2025–present)

=== Plaza family — Agusan del Sur, Agusan del Norte, Butuan, and Surigao del Sur ===
- Democrito Plaza – governor (1992–1995)
- Valentina Plaza – governor (1971–1988, 1998–2001)
  - Democrito Plaza II – Butuan mayor (1992–2001, 2004–2010)
  - Leonides Theresa Plaza – Butuan mayor (2001–2004)
  - Rodolfo Plaza – Agusan del Sur representative (2001–2010)
  - Eddiebong Plaza – Agusan del Sur governor (2001–2007, 2010–2019), Agusan del Sur 2nd district representative (2019–present)
  - Maria Valentina Plaza – Agusan del Sur governor (2007–2010)
  - Victor Vicente Plaza – Agusan del Sur 1st district board member (2010–2013), Butuan councilor (2022–present)
  - Derick Plaza – Butuan councilor (2013–2022)
  - Randolph Plaza – Butuan councilor, Loreto, Agusan del Sur vice mayor (2019–present)
  - Roscoe Democrito Plaza – Nasipit, Agusan del Norte mayor (2010–2013, 2022–present)
  - Charito "Ching" Plaza – Agusan del Norte representative (1987–1998)
  - Jane Plaza – Carmen, Surigao del Sur mayor (2016–present)

=== Ponce Enrile family — Cagayan ===
- Alfonso Ponce Enrile – assemblyman, 1st District (1922–1925); patriarch
  - Juan Ponce Enrile – Senate President (2008–2013), senator (1987–1992, 1995–2001, 2004–2016), Minister of Defense (1972–1986), Secretary of Justice (1970–1972), congressman of the 1st District (1992–1995), Mambabatas Pambansa (1978–1986); son of Alfonso
    - Juan "Jack" Ponce Enrile Jr. – congressman, 1st District
    - Sally Ponce Enrile – congresswoman, 1st District (2007–2010); wife of Juan Jr.

=== Puno family — Rizal ===
- Ricardo C. Puno – Minister of Justice (1979–1984)
  - Ronaldo Puno – Interior Secretary (1999–2000, 2006–2010)
  - Roberto Puno – Antipolo representative (2007–2016, 2019–present)
  - Cristina Roa Puno – Antipolo representative (2016–2019)
- Rico J. Puno – Makati councilor (1998–2007, 2016–2018)
  - Tosca Camille T. Puno-Ramos – Makati councilor (2007–2016, 2019–2022)
- Carlito Puno – chair of Higher Education (2005–2007)
- Reynato Puno – Chief Justice (2006–2010)
- Rico E. Puno – interior undersecretary (2010–2012)

== Q ==
=== Quibranza family — Lanao del Norte ===
- Arsenio "Arsing" A. Quibranza – governor (1967–1986); vice governor (1962–1967); mayor of Tubod
  - Imelda "Angging" C. Quibranza-Dimaporo, governor. Daughter. (see Dimaporo family)
    - Abdullah "Bobby" Dimakuta Dimaporo, governor and congressman. Husband of Imelda.
    - Fatima Aliah Quibranza Dimaporo, congresswoman. Daughter of Bobby and Imelda.
    - Mohammad Khalid Quibranza Dimaporo, governor. Son of Bobby and Imelda.
    - Sittie Aminah Quibranza Dimaporo, congresswoman. Daughter of Bobby and Imelda.

=== Quimbo family — Marikina ===
- Miro Quimbo – congressman
- Stella Quimbo – congresswoman

== R ==
=== Rama family — Cebu, Agusan del Norte, Davao del Sur, and Leyte ===
- Vicente Rama (1887–1956) — Senator (1945–1947), 2nd Cebu 3rd District Representative (1922–28; 1934–35), 2nd Mayor of Cebu City (1938–1940), and Member of the Cebu Municipal Council (1916–1922). Recognized as the Father of the Cebu City Charter.
  - Dario G. Rama Sr. (b. 1911) — Lawyer
    - Dario C. Rama Jr. (d. 2019) — COMELEC Commissioner (1986–1993), Postmaster General (early–mid 2000's) and lawyer
    - Ramon "Ike" C. Rama — Barangay Captain and Councilor (2013 onwards), Sambag I, Cebu City
  - Osmundo "Mundo" G. Rama (1914–1998) — 19th Governor of Cebu (1969–1976; 1986–1988), 5th Vice Governor of Cebu (1968–1969), and Cebu City Councilor (1955–1963)
    - Dario P. Rama Jr. — Cebu City Assistant Prosecutor (until 1993)
    - Enrique P. Rama — 11th Vice Governor of Cebu (1998–1992)
  - Laurente G. Rama (1917–2002) — Sea captain
    - George R. Rama (1949–2021) — Cebu City Councilor (2001–2004) and Barangay Captain of Basak San Nicolas, Cebu City
    - Annabelle Rama (born 1952) — 2013 candidate for Congresswoman from Cebu City's 1st (North) District; talent manager, celebrity businesswoman, and mother of celebrities Ruffa, Richard, and Raymond Gutierrez
  - Fernando G. Rama (1920–1991) — Cebu City Councilor
    - Eduardo "Eddie" L. Rama Sr. (1944–2000) — former Agusan Del Norte Governor (1988–1995) and Congressman (1995–1998)
      - Eduardo "Edu" R. Rama Jr. (b. 1978) — Cebu City 2nd (South) District Congressman (since 2019), former City Councilor (2004–2013; 2016–2019), and former head of barangay affairs (2013–2016)
        - Georgia Felice "Jaja" Chiongbian-Rama (wife of Edu) — Cebu City Tourism Commissioner (early 2010's)
    - Michael "Mike" L. Rama (b. 1954) — 26th Mayor of Cebu City (2010–2016; 2021–2024), 16th Vice Mayor of Cebu City (2001–2010; 2019–2021), and City Councilor (1992–2001)
      - Malou Mandanat-Rama (wife of Mike, m. 2021) — Former Cebu City Hall employee
      - Araceli Lim Francisco (ex-wife of Mike, ann. 2000) — Eastern Visayas Director of the Bureau of Internal Revenue (BIR)
      - Mikel F. Rama (b. 1985) — lawyer and Cebu City Councilor from the 2nd (South) District (2025–present)
    - Unnamed son of Fernando
      - Vincent L. Rama (b. 1968) — Leyte 4th District Provincial Board Member (2022–2025) and Ormoc City Councilor; candidate for mayor of Albuera, Leyte (2025)
        - Carmen Torres-Rama (wife of Vincent, b. 1973) — Ormoc City Councilor (2022–Present) and Leyte 4th District Provincial Board Member (2019–2022); elder sister of Ormoc City Mayor Lucy Torres-Gomez
    - Unnamed daughter of Fernando
      - Haley Rama Sy — Barangay councilor, Cebu City
  - Napoleon "Nap" G. Rama (1923–2016) — lawyer, journalist, vice president of the 1971 Constitutional Convention and member of the 1986 Constitutional Commission
  - Clemente "Cle" G. Rama (1935–2006) — Cebu City Councilor (until 1992)

Other relatives from Cebu

- John L. Rama — Barangay councilor, Basak San Nicolas, Cebu City (2023–present)
- Ricky Rama Poca – former columnist and chairman of the University of San Carlos - Political Science Department https://usc.edu.ph/usc-condoles-the-death-of-roderic-r-poca
- Atty. Lambert Poca Cuizon – civil servant, lawyer and former educator

Other relatives from Davao del Sur

- Carl Jason Rama Bautista (b. 1988) — Mayor of Kiblawan, Davao del Sur (2016–2022, 2025–present); candidate for Davao del Sur governor (2022)
- Edmundito N. Rama — Vice Mayor and Municipal Councilor of Kiblawan, Davao del Sur

=== Ramos family — Pangasinan ===
- Narciso Ramos, assemblyman (1934–1941, 1945–1946), Secretary of Foreign Affairs (1965–1968)
  - **Fidel Valdez Ramos** – **9th President of the Philippines (1992–1998)**
  - Leticia Ramos-Shahani, Senator (1987–1998)
    - Ranjit Ramos-Shahani, (representative of the 6th District, 1995–1998), board member 6th District
- Carbine Ramos – vice mayor, Chief of the Philippine National Councilors (1988–1990)
  - Dennis Ponce Ramos, Councilor (2015–2018), Re-elected (2018)

=== Recto family — Batangas ===
- Claro M. Recto – (senator 1945–1946; 1953–1960 and representative of the 3rd District 1919–1928)
  - Rafael R. Recto – (assemblyman, Batasang Pambansa 1984–1986), son of Claro M. Recto
    - Richard Recto – (vice governor 1995–2001; 2004–2007)
    - Ralph Recto – (representative of the 4th District 1992–2001, 2022–present; senator 2001–2007, 2010–2022), son of Rafael Recto
    - Vilma Santos-Recto – (mayor of Lipa 1998–2007, governor 2007–2016, representative of the 6th District 2016–2022), wife of Ralph

=== Remulla family — Cavite ===
- Juanito Remulla Sr. – governor; vice governor; provincial board member
  - Juanito Victor C. Remulla Jr. – governor/vice governor/board member
  - Gilbert Remulla – congressman, senatorial candidate 2010
  - Jesus Crispin Remulla – governor/congressman, 7th district, board member
    - Crispin Diego Remulla – board member/councilor

=== Revilla/Bautista family — Nueva Ecija, Rizal, Cavite, Pasig ===
- Ramon Revilla Sr. – senator 1992–2004
  - Ramon "Mon" Bautista Jr. (son) – mayor of San Leonardo, Nueva Ecija (2001–2005)
    - Robert Jaworski (son-in-law, husband of Evelyn Bautista) – senator (1998–2004)
      - Robert Jaworski Jr. (grandson) – councilor of San Juan (1995–1998), congressman of Pasig (2004–2007), vice mayor of Pasig (2022–present)
  - Marlon Bautista (son) – party representative 1-PACMAN (2022–present)
  - Ramon Revilla Jr. (son) – vice governor of Cavite (1995–1998), governor of Cavite (1998–2001), chairman of the Videogram Regulatory Board (2002–2004), senator (2004–2016, 2019–2025)
    - Lani Mercado-Revilla (daughter-in-law, wife of Ramon Jr.) – mayor of Bacoor (2016–2022), congresswoman of the second district of Cavite (2010–2016, 2022–present)
      - Bryan Revilla (grandson) – representative, Agimat Partylist (2022–present)
      - Ramon "Jolo" Revilla III (grandson) – vice governor of Cavite (2013–2022), congressman of the first district of Cavite (2022–present)
      - Ram Revilla (grandson) – board member of second district of Cavite (2022–present)
  - Rowena Bautista-Mendiola (daughter) – councilor of Imus (1988–1992), councilor of Bacoor (2013–2022), vice mayor of Bacoor (2022–present)
  - Princess Bautista-Ocampo (daughter) – non-politician
    - Igi Revilla Ocampo (grandson) – councilor of Imus (2022–present)
  - Strike Revilla (son) – councilor of Bacoor (1995–1998), board member of first district of Cavite (1998–2005), director of Philippine Charity Sweepstakes Office (2005–2007), congressman of the second district of Cavite (2016–2022), mayor of Bacoor (2007–2016, 2022–present)
  - Andrea Bautista-Ynares (daughter) – mayor of Antipolo, Rizal (2019–2022)
    - Casimiro Yñares III (son-in-law, husband of Andrea) – governor of Rizal (2007–2013), mayor of Antipolo (2013–2019, 2022–present)
  - Jorwin Bautista (son) – barangay captain, P.F. Espiritu (Panapaan) V, Bacoor

=== Reyes family — Marinduque ===
- Damian J. Reyes (governor 1925–1929)
  - Edmundo M. Reyes Sr. (Commissioner of Immigration) – son of Damian
  - Luisito M. Reyes, vice governor (1980–1988), governor (1988–1995) – son of Damian
  - Remedios Reyes-Festin, mayor of Boac (1980–1986) – daughter of Damian
  - Carmencita Reyes (née Ongsiako) – congresswoman 1987–1998, 2007–2010, assemblywoman (1978–1986), governor (1998–2007, 2010–2019), wife of Edmundo Sr.
    - Edmundo O. Reyes Jr. – congressman (1998–2007), son of Edmundo Sr. and Carmencita
    - Regina Ongsiako Reyes – congresswoman (2013–2017), daughter of Edmundo Sr. and Carmencita

=== Reyes family — Palawan ===
- Francisco "Paquito" Reyes – mayor of Coron during the Second World War.
- Mario Reyes Sr. – son of Paquito. OIC mayor of Coron
- Joel Tolentino Reyes – son of Mario Sr. Provincial board member, then vice governor, then governor
- Mario T. Reyes Jr. – son of Mario Sr. and brother to Joel – Sangguniang Bayan member of Coron, then vice mayor, then mayor of Coron
- Clara Espiritu Reyes – wife of Joel – vice governor, mayor of Coron

=== Robes family – San Jose del Monte ===
- Guillermo Robes – mayor (1980–1986)
- Arthur Robes – representative lone district (2007–2016), mayor (2016–2025), representative lone district (2025–present)
- Florida "Rida" Perez–Robes – mayor (2025–present), representative lone district (2016–2025); wife of Arthur
- Oliver "Richie" Robes – city councilor (2019–present)

=== Robles family — Baras, Rizal ===
- Carmelita Olano Robles – councilor (1995–1998)
- Wilfredo Caisip Robles – vice mayor of Baras (2001–2004; 2013–2022), mayor (2004–2013; 2022–present)
  - Kathrine Bulaong Robles – mayor of Baras (2013–2022), vice mayor (2022–present)
- Porfirio Reyes Robles – councilor (2001–2004)
- Hector Matignas Robles – councilor (2013–2022; 2025–present), board member from the Second District (2022–2025)
- Vergil Fernandez Robles – councilor (2010–2016; 2019–present)
- Peter Leo Pilapil Robles – councilor (2025–present)

=== Robredo family — Camarines Sur ===
- Jesse Robredo – mayor of Naga (1988–1998, 2001–2010), Secretary of the Interior and Local Government (2010–2012)
- **Maria Leonor "Leni" Robredo** – mayor of Naga (2025–present), 14th **Vice President of the Philippines** (2016–2022), representative of Camarines Sur's 3rd district (2013–2016)

=== Roco family — Camarines Sur ===
- Sulpicio Roco Jr. – representative, 2nd District (1992–1998); mayor, Naga (1998–2001)
- Raul Roco – senator

=== Rodriguez family — Rizal and Davao City ===
- Eulogio Rodriguez Sr. – municipal president of Montalban (1909–1916), governor of Rizal (1916–1919; 1922–1923), mayor of Manila (1923–1924; 1940–1941), representative of the Lone District of Nueva Vizcaya (1924–1925), representative of the Second District of Rizal (1925–1928; 1931–1935), Secretary of Commerce and Agriculture (1934–1938), senator (1945–1947; 1949–1964)
  - Eulogio Rodriguez Jr. – governor of Rizal (1937–1944)
  - Isidro Rodriguez Sr. – governor of Rizal (1955–1986)
    - Adelina Santos Rodriguez, mayor of Quezon City (1976–1986). Wife of Isidro Sr.
    - Isidro Rodriguez Jr. – representative of the Second District of Rizal (1998–2007; 2010–2019)
    - Adelina Rodriguez-Zaldarriaga – representative of the Second District of Rizal (2007–2010)
- Julian A. Rodriguez – mayor of Davao City (1954–1955), brother of Eulogio Sr.

=== Roman family — Bataan ===
- Antonino P. Roman – member of the House of Representatives from the First District (1998–2007), Presidential Legislative Liaison Office (PLLO) Secretary from 2010 to 2012
  - Herminia Roman – member of the House of Representatives from the First District (2007–2016)
    - Geraldine Roman – member of the House of Representatives from the First District (2016–2025)
    - Antonino "Tony" Roman III – member of the House of Representatives from the First District (2025–present)

=== Romato family — Lanao del Sur ===
- Datu Mombao Romato – mayor of Butig, Lanao del Sur (1978–1986, 1998)
- Abdulrahman Romato – mayor of Butig, Lanao del Sur (1988–1995)
  - Basit Jannati Mimbantas Abbas – member of the Bangsamoro Parliament, (2019–present), son-in-law of Abdulrahman
- Rasmia Usman Romato Salic – assemblywoman of the 6th ARMM Regional Legislative Assembly (2008–2012)
  - Sultan Fahad Salic, mayor of Marawi (2007–2016), husband of Rasmia
- Fahad Mimbantas Romato Arimao – provincial board member, 2nd District, Lanao del Sur Provincial Board (2022–present)

=== Romero-Muñoz-Calumpang family — Negros Oriental ===
- Fernando Agustín Vélaz de Medrano y Bracamonte y Dávila: Marquis of Tabuerniga, 14th Marquis of Cañete (GE), 6th Marquis of Fuente el Sol, 8th Marquis of Navamorcuende, 15th Lord of Montalbo, Knight of the Order of Malta
  - Laureano Calumpang
    - Leogardo Calumpang: gobernadorcillo of Tanjay (ca. 1870)
      - Ambrosia Salimbagat, married to Ildefonso Banogon, cabeza de barangay of Tanjay (ca. 1878–1895)
        - Pio S. Banogon: first presidente municipal of Jimalalud (1910–1916); municipal councilor (1919–1922)
      - Martin Calumpang: cabeza de barangay of Tanjay (ca. 1860)
        - Felipe Calumpang: vice presidente municipal of Tanjay (1916–1922)
        - Antonino Calumpang: cabeza de barangay of Tanjay (ca. 1890)
          - Angel Calumpang: juez de paz of Tanjay (ca. 1920); member of the Junta Provincial (1925–1931)
            - Fernando Calumpang: vice mayor of Tanjay (1956–1959)
          - Perfecto Calumpang: wartime mayor of Tanjay (ca. 1942)
            - Antonio Calumpang: councilor of Tanjay (1998–2004)
          - Concejo Calumpang de Martínez: wartime mayor of Tanjay (ca. 1942); wife of José Martínez y Pinili, mayor of Dumaguete (1931–1934)
        - Pedro Calumpang
          - Marcelino Calumpang
            - Teopisto Calumpang Sr.: municipal and regional trial court judge (ca. 1970–1990)
              - Teopisto Calumpang Jr.: city councilor of Tanjay (2010–2019)
      - Francisca Calumpang, married to Bernardo Barot, cabeza de barangay, gobernadorcillo, and juez de paz of Tanjay (ca. 1870–1900)
        - Felix Calumpang Barot: first American-era juez de paz of Tanjay (1901–1920)
          - Manuel Barot Sr.: justice of the peace of Tanjay (1946–1956); married to Gerónima Villegas, daughter of Atilano Villegas, 70th governor of Negros Oriental (1925–1931)
            - Felix V. Barot: city councilor of Tanjay (2001–2003)
      - Agapito Calumpang: cabeza de barangay, teniente mayor, and gobernadorcillo of Tanjay (ca. 1870–1900); first vice presidente municipal of Tanjay (1901–1903)
        - Gonzalo Calumpang: vice presidente municipal of Tanjay (1912–1916)
      - Alejandra Inés Calumpang, married to José María Francisco de Paula Muñoz y Teves*: last capitan municipal of Tanjay (ca. 1880–1900); first presidente municipal of Tanjay (1901–1905)
        - Luis Muñoz: vice presidente municipal of Tanjay (1904–1909)
        - Josefa Caridad Muñoz, married to Francisco Domingo Romero y Derecho**: presidente municipal of Tanjay (1909–1916); member of the junta provincial (1916–1922)
          - José E. Romero: member of the Provincial Board (1925–1931); member of the Philippine Legislature for the second district (1931–1935); delegate and majority floor leader to the 1934 Constitutional Convention; member of the National Assembly for the Second District (1935–1941); member of the 1st Congress of the Commonwealth of the Philippines for the Second District (1945–1946); senator of the 1st Congress (1946); ambassador extraordinary and plenipotentiary of the Philippines to the Court of St. James's (1949–1953); secretary of the Department of Education (1959–1962)
            - Jose V. Romero Jr.: chairman of the Philippine Coconut Authority (1987–1989); undersecretary of the Department of Agriculture (1987–1989); ambassador extraordinary and plenipotentiary to Italy (1989–1991)
      - Eustaquia Paula Calumpang, married to José María Francisco de Paula Muñoz y Teves (see above)*
        - María Candelaria Muñoz, married to Francisco Domingo Romero y Derecho (see above)**
          - Ramon Feliz Romero y Muñoz, married to María Guadalupe Sarabia y Solís
            - Ramón George Washington Romero y Sarabia: Governor ad interim of Oriental Negros (1980); married to Estela Macías, daughter of Lamberto Macías y Lajato, Assemblyman for the Second District (1953–1972) and sister of Emilio Macías y Cabrera, Assemblyman for the Second District
            - Domingo Jesús Romero: barangay captain of Poblacion 5 and ex-officio member of the city council, Tanjay (2002–2007)
              - Brígido Sibug: councilor for Barangay San Lorenzo, Makati (2007–2013)
              - Frederick Raymund Sibug: councilor for Barangay San Lorenzo, Makati (2013–2017; 2018–2020)
          - Adela Áurea Romero, married to Raymundo 'Modín' Villanueva, Esq., diplomat and chargé d'affaires of the Embassy of the Philippines in London (ca. 1950–1970)
            - Héctor Villanueva y Romero: Press Secretary to Fidel V. Ramos (1995–1998); Postmaster General, Philippine Postal Corporation (2007–2010)
          - Hermenegildo Luis Miguel 'Luisín' Romero y Muñoz, married to Dr. Rosita Robillos y Gómez-Pastrano
            - Miguel Luis Romero y Robillos: Assemblyman for the Second District (1987–1998)
      - Bernardino Calumpang: teniente gobernadorcillo of Tanjay (ca. 1880–1890)
        - Andrés Calumpang
          - Alexander Calumpang: barangay captain of Poblacion 5, Tanjay (ca. 1970)

=== Romualdez-Lopez family — Leyte ===
- Trinidad Lopez-Romualdez (Matriarch)
- Daniel Romualdez Sr. (Patriarch)
  - Justice Norberto Romuáldez – Chief Justice of the Supreme Court of the Philippines
  - Miguel Lopez Romualdez – assemblyman, mayor of Manila during World War II
    - Daniel Romualdez – speaker of the House of Representatives
    - Eduardo Romualdez – Central Bank of the Philippines governor
      - Alberto G. Romualdez – Secretary of the Department of Health
        - Gabriel Luis Quisumbing – representative of the 6th District of Cebu, House of Representatives.
  - Vicente Orestes Lopez Romualdez – provincial Sheriff of Leyte; father of Imelda Romualdez–Marcos.
    - **Imelda Romualdez-Marcos** – **First Lady of the Philippines**; Minister of Human Settlements; governor of Metro Manila; representative of Ilocos Norte.
      - Imee Romualdez Marcos-Manotoc – Governor of Ilocos Norte; Senator (2019–Present)
      - **Ferdinand Romualdez Marcos Jr.** – **17th President of the Republic of the Philippines**
    - Benjamin Romualdez – ambassador, governor of Leyte, assemblyman during the Regular Batasang Pambansa; brother of Imelda Marcos
      - Ferdinand Martin G. Romualdez – representative of the 1st Legislative District of Leyte during the 14th, 15th, 16th, 18th, 19th and 20th Congress; Speaker of the Philippine House of Representatives (2022-2025)
        - Yedda Marie Romualdez – representative, Tingog Sinirangan party-list. Wife of Ferdinand Martin.
          - Andrew Julian Romualdez – representative, Tingog Sinirangan party-list. Son of Ferdinand Martin and Yedda Marie.
    - Alfredo "Bejo" Romualdez – mayor of Tacloban; brother of Imelda Marcos
      - Alfred S. Romualdez – mayor of Tacloban since 2007; representative of the Legislative District of Leyte during the 11th Congress; son of Bejo
      - Cristina "Kring-kring" Gonzales-Romualdez – city councilor of Tacloban; wife of Alfred
- Fidel G. Romualdez – councilor of Julita, Leyte
  - Jude Andrei M. Romualdez – municipal councilor of Julita
  - John Lorenz "Jolo" M. Romualdez – former consultant Office of the Secretary General House of Representatives

=== Romualdo family — Camiguin ===
- Pedro Romualdo – congressman (1987–1998, 2007–2013), governor (1998–2007)
  - Jurdin Jesus Romualdo – congressman (1998–2007, 2022–present), mayor of Mambajao, governor (2007–2016, 2019–2022). Son of Pedro.
    - Maria Luisa Romualdo – governor (2016–2019), mayor of Mambajao. Wife of Jurdin.
      - Xavier Jesus Romualdo – congressman (2013–2022), governor (2022–present). Son of Jurdin
  - Rodin Romualdo – vice governor. Son of Pedro.

=== Romulo family — Quezon City, Pasig and Valenzuela ===
- Carlos P. Romulo – secretary/minister of foreign affairs
  - Roberto Romulo – secretary of foreign affairs
  - Alberto Romulo – assemblyman from Quezon City (1984–1986), senator (1987–1998)
    - Roman Romulo – congressman, Lone District of Pasig (2010–present)
      - Shalani Soledad-Romulo – member of the Valenzuela city council from 2nd District (2004–2013)
    - Bernadette Romulo-Puyat – Secretary of Tourism (2018–2022)

=== Roxas family — Capiz ===
- **Manuel Roxas** – 5th president of the Philippines (1946–1948); speaker of the House; Senate president
  - Gerardo Roxas (representative 1st District, senator; son of Manuel)
    - Manuel "Mar" Araneta Roxas II (representative, 1st District, senator, DTI and DOTC secretary, DILG Secretary; son of Gerry)
    - Gerardo "Dinggoy" Roxas Jr. (representative, 1st District; son of Gerry)

=== Roxas family — Pasay ===
- Lito Roxas – councilor, 1st district (1998–2004), congressman of Lone District (2007–2010)
  - Jenny Roxas – councilor, 1st district (2013–present)

== S ==
=== Salceda family — Albay ===
- Jesus Salceda Sr. – mayor of Polangui
  - Jesus "Jesap" S. Salceda Jr. – vice mayor of Polangui
    - Joey Salceda – member of the House of Representatives from the Third District (1998–2007), governor (2007–2016), member of the House of Representatives from the Second District (2016–2025)

=== Sali family – Tawi-Tawi ===
- Yshmael "Mhang" Sali – governor
  - Al-Syed Sali – vice governor. Son of Yshmael.
- Dimszar Sali – representative. Nephew of Yshmael.

=== Salvame family — Palawan ===
- Edgardo Salvame – member for Palawan's 1st district (2022–2024)
- Rosalie Salvame – wife, member for Palawan's 1st district (2025–present)

=== San Juan family — Rizal ===
- Bernardo San Juan Sr. – mayor of Cardona (1992–2001)
  - Bernardo San Juan Jr. – vice mayor of Cardona (2007–2010), mayor of Cardona (2010–2019; 2022–present)
- Frisco San Juan Sr. – 2nd district representative (1965–1972), Region IV-A representative (1978–1984)
  - Frisco S. San Juan Jr. – vice governor (2007–2016)
    - Mikhail San Juan – board member (2023–present)
- Reynaldo San Juan Sr. – governor (1988–1992)
  - Reynaldo San Juan Jr. – 2nd district board member (2007–2016; 2025–present), vice governor (2016–2025)

=== San Luis family — Laguna ===
- Felicisimo San Luis – councilor of Santa Cruz (1947–1959), governor of Laguna (1959–1992)
  - Felicidad Sangalongos–San Luis (Felicisimo's third wife) – candidate for governor of Laguna in 1995 (lost)
    - Rodolfo San Luis – mayor of Santa Cruz (1988–1995), representative from Laguna's 4th district (1998–2004)
    - Edgar San Luis – representative from Laguna's 4th district (2007–2013), mayor of Santa Cruz (2019–2025)
      - Rai-Ann Agustine San Luis – board member from Laguna's 4th district (2013–2022; 2025–present)
      - Francis Joseph San Luis – board member from Laguna's 4th district (2022–2025)
      - Anna Clarissa San Luis–Villanueva – candidate for councilor of Santa Cruz in 2025 (lost)
      - Felicisimo Mateo San Luis – candidate for representative from Laguna's 4th district in 2019 (withdrawn)
    - Restico de los Reyes Jr. (Felicisimo's son-in-law) – member of the Philippine Constitutional Commission of 1986, assemblyman from Laguna's at-large district (1984–1986), councilor of Santa Cruz (1971–1980)

=== San Pedro family — San Jose del Monte, Bulacan ===
- Rogelio San Pedro – mayor, 1988–1991
  - Reynaldo "Rey" San Pedro – mayor, 2010–2016; son of Rogelio
  - Ricardo San Pedro – barangay captain, San Martin II, 2004–2013; son of Rogelio
  - Francisco San Pedro – second cousin of Reynaldo
    - Thelma San Pedro – councilor, 2004–2013; wife of Francisco

=== Santillan family — Batangas, Cavite, Manila, Antique, Albay, Pampanga ===
- Lauro L. Santillan – barangay lieutenant, San Fernando, Malvar, Batangas c. 1930; municipal councilor c. 1950
  - Jose P. Santillan – Cavite 1971 Constitutional Convention delegate
  - Oscar Santillan – Legazpi City councilor, 2010
  - Laurel L. Santillan – chairman of Brgy. San Fernando, Malvar, Batangas c. 1960
  - Erwin "EJ" C. Santillan – 2010 Sangguniang Kabataan, Manila 5th District, Brgy.693, Zone 75
  - Jon Santillan-Wong – provincial board member, 3rd District of Batangas (2001), candidate for House of Representatives (2004)
  - Gregorio M. Santillan Sr. – mayor of San Simon, Pampanga 1953–1956

=== Santos family — Talavera, Nueva Ecija ===
- Nerito Lacanilao Santos – mayor of Talavera (2004–2013)
  - Nerivi Sariente Santos-Martinez – mayor (2013–2022), vice mayor (2022–2025)
  - Nerito Sariente Santos Jr. – mayor (2022–2025), vice mayor (2025–present)

=== Saquilayan family — Cavite ===
- Homer Saquilayan – vice mayor of Imus, 1998–2001, mayor (2001–March 2004; June 2004 – 2007; 2010–2011; March–April 2013), board member of the 3rd District (2016–2019)
  - Edgardo T. Saquilayan – barangay captain, Bucandala, Imus 2002–2013, city councilor of Imus, 2013–2021
    - Edgardo D. Saquilayan Jr. – city public information officer, 2013–present
    - Lloren Dionella "Yen" G. Saquilayan – city councilor of Imus, 2021–present

=== Sarmiento family — Buenavista, Marinduque ===
- Agaton Sarmiento – mayor
  - Recaredo Sarmiento – mayor, son of Agaton
    - Ofelia Sarmiento Madrigal – mayor, daughter of Recaredo
      - Russel Sarmiento Madrigal – barangay captain, mayor (2010–2019), son of Ofelia
- Jose Antonio Carrion – governor (1995–1998, 2007–2010), nephew of Recaredo
- Sergio Sarmiento Rey – councilor, nephew of Agaton
  - Felicismo P. Del Mundo – councilor, son-in-law of Sergio
  - Hannilee Rey Siena – vice mayor, councilor, granddaughter of Sergio
    - Justin Angelo Manrique – councilor (Boac, Marinduque), great-grandson of Sergio

=== Singson-Gacula family — Ilocos Sur ===
- Chavit Singson – governor, mayor of Narvacan 2019–present
  - Eric Singson – representative, 2nd District (1992–1998, 2001–2004)
  - Grace G. Singson – representative, 2nd District, 11th Congress
  - Eric G. Singson Jr. – representative, 2nd District, 15th Congress (2010–2013)
  - Allen G. Singson – mayor, Candon (2010–2013)
  - Ricardo Gacula – representative, 2nd District, 2nd Congress (1949–1953), 3rd Congress (1953–1957)
  - George Ricardo Gacula – mayor, Taytay, Rizal (July 2004 – June 2013, July 2016–present)
  - Ryan Luis Singson – governor (2013–present)
  - Ronald Singson – representative of the 1st District (2010–2012, 2013–2016)

=== Sinsuat family — Maguindanao del Norte ===
- Datu Sinsuat Balabaran – senator (1934)

=== Soriano family — Cagayan / Romblon ===
- Jefferson Soriano – mayor of Tuguegarao (2010–2022)
  - Charo Soriano – city councilor of Tuguegarao (2022–present)
    - Don Alejandro Gelindon Soriano from Blumentritt, Manila / San Carlos, Pangasinan – municipal president of Looc, Romblon 1922–1925
        - Francisco Clemente Soriano – son of Alejandro, municipal councilor of Looc, Romblon
          - Don Francisco Soriano – gobernadorcillo 1800s of Looc, Romblon
          - Francis Soriano Maagma – great-grandson of Alejandro Soriano and son of Salvador Salido Maagma – municipal councilor of Ibajay, Aklan; SK chairman of Maloco, Ibajay, Aklan (2007–2010)

=== Sotto family — Cebu, Quezon City, Parañaque and Pasig ===
- Filemon Sotto, member of the House of Representatives from Cebu's Third District (1907–1916), senator (1916–1922).
- Vicente Sotto, member of the House of Representatives from Cebu's Second District (1922–1925), senator (1946–1950). Brother of Filemon.
  - Valmar "Val" Sotto – councilor, 2nd district of Parañaque (2004–2013)
    - Viktor Eriko "Wahoo" Sotto, councilor, 2nd district of Parañaque (2013–present). Son of Val.
  - Vicente "Tito" Sotto III – vice mayor of Quezon City (1988–1992), chairman of the Dangerous Drugs Board (2008–2009), senator (1992–2004, 2010–2022, 2025–present)
    - Diorella Maria "Lala" Sotto-Antonio, councilor, 6th District of Quezon City (2013–2022), chairperson of the Movie and Television Review and Classification Board (2022–present). Daughter of Tito.
    - Gian Carlo Sotto, councilor, 3rd District of Quezon City (2010–2019), vice mayor of Quezon City (2019–present). Son of Tito.
  - Victor Maria Regis "Vico" Sotto, councilor, 1st district of Pasig (2016–2019), mayor of Pasig (2019–present). Nephew of Tito.

=== Suansing family – Sultan Kudarat and Nueva Ecija ===
- Horacio Suansing Jr – representative, Sultan Kudarat 2nd district.
  - Estrellita Suansing – representative, Nueva Ecija 1st district. Wife of Horacio.

=== Suarez family — Quezon ===
- Danilo Suarez – representative, 3rd District (1992–2001, 2004–2013); governor (2019–2022)

=== Sumulong family — Rizal ===
- Juan Sumulong – senator (1925–1935)
- Lorenzo Sumulong – son of Juan; representative, 2nd district (1946–1949); senator (1954–1972)
- Victor Sumulong – son of Lorenzo; representative, lone district of Antipolo (1998–2001); representative, 2nd district, Antipolo (2001–2007); mayor, Antipolo (2007–2009)
- **Corazon Sumulong Cojuangco-Aquino** – granddaughter of Juan (see Cojuangco Family (Tarlac)); married to Benigno Aquino (see Aquino family (Tarlac)); President of the Philippines

=== Sy-Alvarado family — Bulacan ===
- Wilhelmino Sy-Alvarado – representative, 1st district (1998–2007), governor (2010–2019)
- Victoria Sy-Alvarado – representative, 1st district (2007–2016)

== T ==
=== Tabanda family – Baguio, Benguet, Ilocos Norte, and Ilocos Sur ===
- Fermin P. Tabanda – mayor, San Vicente, Ilocos Sur (1946–1978)
- Irene R. Tabanda – mayor, San Vicente, Ilocos Sur (1978–1985)
- Jose P. Tabanda, Sr. – state prosecutor, Ilocos Sur (1967–1983), regional trial court judge, Batac, Ilocos Norte (1983–1989)
- Jose C. Tabanda III – mayor and vice mayor (1988–present), San Vicente, Ilocos Sur
- Jonan D. Tabanda – mayor, San Vicente, Ilocos Sur (2022–present)
- Trinidad "Trinette" C. Tabanda – barangay councilor, San Vicente, Ilocos Sur (1981)
- Maria Nancy Dy Tabanda – mayor and vice mayor, San Vicente, Ilocos Sur (1998–2001, 2010–2013)
- Edna C. Tabanda – mayor, La Trinidad, Benguet
- Betty Lourdes F. Tabanda – councilor, Baguio (1992–present)

=== Tallado family — Camarines Norte ===
- Edgardo "Egay" Tallado – governor (2010–2022)
- Josefina "Josie" Tallado – representative, 1st District (2019–present); wife of Edgardo.

=== Tan family — Quezon ===
- Angelina Tan – representative of the Fourth District (2013–2022), governor (2022–present)
- Keith Micah D.L. Tan – representative of the Fourth District (2022–present)

=== Tan family — Samar ===
- Milagrosa "Mila" Tan (née Tee) – board member, 2nd District (1998–2001); governor (2001–2010, 2019 until her death); representative, 2nd District (2010–2019).
- Sharee Ann Tan – governor (2010–2019, 2022–present); representative, 2nd District (2007–2010, 2019–2022). Daughter of Milagrosa.
- Stephen James Tan – representative, 1st District (2022–present); vice governor (2010–2019). Milagrosa.
- Reynolds Michael Tan – representative, 2nd District (2022–present); governor (2019–2022); vice governor (2019). Son of Milagrosa.

=== Tan family – Sulu ===
- Abdusakur Mahail Tan – governor
- Abdusakur Tan II – vice governor. Son of Abdusakur.
- Samier Tan – representative, District 1. Son of Abdusakur.
- Shernee Tan – representative, Kusug Tausug party-list. Daughter of Abdusakur.
- Shihla Tan-Hayudini – mayor, Maimbung. Daughter of Abdusakur.
- Aiman Hayudini – vice mayor, Maimbung. Son of Shihla.
- Kerkhar Tan – mayor, Jolo. Cousin of Abdusakur.
- Ezzeddin "Zed" Tan – vice mayor, Jolo. Son of Kerkhar.

=== Tanjuatco family — Rizal ===
- Emigdio Palou Tanjuatco III – representative of the Second District (2022–present), board member of the Second District (2013–2022)

=== Tañada family — Quezon ===
- Lorenzo M. Tañada – senator (1947–1971), Solicitor General (1945–1947), grand old man of philippine politics, opposition leader during the Marcos Dictatorship, Philippine Legion of Honor Chief Commander (highest rank)
- Wigberto Tañada – senator (1987-1995), representative of the 4th District (1995–2001)
- Lorenzo Tañada III – representative of the 4th District (2004–2013)

=== Tawantawan family — Lanao del Norte and Lanao del Sur ===
- Sultan Gaos Tawantawan – Warlord of Lanao and Misamis

=== Teves-Pinili family — Negros Oriental and Muntinlupa ===
- Gary Teves – congressman 3rd district of Negros Oriental, governor, Secretary of Finance
- Pryde Henry Teves – congressman 3rd district of Negros Oriental, mayor of Bayawan 2015–present
- Dandan Teves Leon – councilor, Dumaguete
- Arnolfo "Arnie" Teves Jr. – congressman, 3rd district of Negros Oriental
- Phanie Teves – vice mayor-elect of Muntinlupa; councilor, 1st district of Muntinlupa 2013–2022
- Hermenegildo "Bindoy" Teves Villanueva – mayor of Bais, governor, congressman, senator, Secretary of Labor

=== Tiangco family — Navotas ===
- Toby Tiangco – mayor (1998–1999, 2000, 2001–2010, 2019–present), representative (2010–2019)
- John Rey Tiangco – mayor (2010–2019), representative (2019–present)

=== Ting family — Cagayan ===
- Randolph Ting – mayor of Tuguegarao (2001–2007), representative of the 3rd District (2010–2019)

=== Tolentino family — Cavite ===
- Francis Tolentino – mayor of Tagaytay (1986–1987, 1995–2004), chairman of the Metropolitan Manila Development Authority (2010–2015), presidential adviser to Rodrigo Duterte (2017–2018), senator (2019–2025)
- Abraham Tolentino – councilor of Tagaytay (1998–2004), representative of the 7th District (2013–2019), representative of the 8th District (2019–2022), mayor of Tagaytay (2004–2013, 2022–2025)
- Athena Tolentino – councilor of Tagaytay (2019–2022), vice governor (2022–2024)
- Aniela Tolentino – representative of the 8th District (2022–present)

=== Treñas family — Iloilo City ===
- Jerry Treñas – mayor (1992, 2001–2010, 2019–2025), representative (2010–2019)
- Raisa Treñas-Chu – mayor (2025–present)

=== Tulfo family — Quezon City ===
- Raffy Tulfo – senator (2022–present)
- Jocelyn Pua-Tulfo – representative of ACT-CIS Partylist (2019–present). Wife of Raffy.
- Ralph Pua Tulfo – representative of the 2nd District (2022–present)
- Erwin Tulfo – Secretary of Social Welfare and Development (June–December 2022), senator (2025–present)
- Wanda Tulfo-Teo – Secretary of Tourism (2016–2018)

=== Tupas family — Iloilo ===
- Raul Tupas
- Binky April Tupas
- Niel Tupas Jr.
- Lex Tupas
- Niel Tupas Sr.

=== Ty-Serra family — Surigao del Sur ===
- Adela Serra-Ty – mayor of Tandag, governor
- Vicente Ty Pimentel Jr. – mayor of Carrascal, governor
- Johnny Ty Pimentel – vice governor, governor, congressman of 2nd District
- Alexander Ty Pimentel – vice mayor, mayor of Tandag, governor, congressman of 2nd District

== U ==
=== Umali family — Nueva Ecija, Oriental Mindoro, Lipa, Olongapo and Zambales ===
- Alfonso Umali Jr. – 2nd District representative (2001–2010; 2022–present), governor of Oriental Mindoro (2010–2019)
- Reynaldo Umali – 2nd District representative (2010–2019)
- Aurelio "Oyie" Matias Umali – governor of Nueva Ecija (2007–2016; 2019–present), representative of the 3rd District of Nueva Ecija (2001–2007)
- Czarina "Cherry" Domingo-Umali – governor of Nueva Ecija (2016–2019); representative of the 3rd District of Nueva Ecija (2007–2016)

=== Ungab family — Davao City ===
- Isidro Ungab – congressman, third district (2007–2016, 2019–present), councilor (1995–2004)

Uy family — Isabela Allan Uy Ty (Partylist congressman LPGMA present) Jose Uy (mayor / vice mayor of Gamu, 1960s–1970s) Tomas Tobon Uy (mayor of Gamu, 1980s–1990s) Nestor M. Uy (Brgy. Kagawad/ABC president, barangay captain/ councilor, 2007–2013/mayor of Gamu present) Tim Uy Batang Gamu (Councilor Gamu) Arnel Uy Ty (Partylist congressman LPGMA 2010–present) Christian Niño Uy (mayor of Aurora) Carlito Uy (vice mayor of Burgos, 1989–1992) William T. Uy (mayor of Aurora) Kervin Francis Uy (mayor of Burgos) Isis Uy (mayor of Burgos) Charlton L. Uy (councilor, 2010–2013/mayor of Cabatuan) Antonio J. Uy (councilor of Ilagan, 2010–present) Jessamyn Uy (councilor Ilagan present) Christopher Uy (vice mayor of Tumauini, 2010–present) Arthur Uy (councilor of Gamu, 2007–2013) Cynthia Uy (councilor of Cauayan present) Ariel Uy (councilor of Cauayan present) Walter Uy (councilor of Echague present) Matvee Uy Espejo (councilor of Burgos present) May Angela Uy (councilor of Burgos present) Edwin Uy (congressman 2nd district, 2001–2010) Kristin Uy (councilor of Roxas) Bondy Uy (Mayor Ilagan) Margarette Uy-chin (councilor of Ilagan)

=== Uy family — Zamboanga del Norte ===
- Roberto "Berto" Yu Uy – mayor of Dipolog (1998–2007, 2025–present); governor (2013–2022)
- Roberto "Pinpin" T. Uy Jr., representative of the First District of Zamboanga del Norte (2023–present), and mayor of Polanco (2013–2016). Son of Berto.
- Darel Dexter Tang Uy, mayor of Dipolog (2016–2025); governor (2025–present). Son of Berto & Evelyn.

=== Uy family — Davao de Oro, Davao Del Norte ===
- Jayvee Tyron L. Uy – board member, 2nd District (2013–2016); governor (2016–2022); vice governor (2022–present)

== V ==
=== Velasco family — Marinduque ===
- Presbitero Velasco – governor (2019–2025)
- Lord Allan Jay Velasco – son of Presbitero – representative of lone district (2010–2013, 2016–2025)

=== Vergara family — Nueva Ecija ===
- Jay Vergara – mayor (1998–2007, 2010–2019); vice mayor (2019–2025); representative of the 3rd District (2025–present)
- Rosanna Vergara – wife of Jay; representative of the 3rd District (2016–2025)

=== Villafuerte family — Camarines Sur ===
- Luis Villafuerte Sr., assemblyman (1984–1986), governor (1995–2004), representative of the 2nd District (2004–2010), representative of the 3rd District (2010–2013). Son of Mariano Sr.
- Luis Raymund "LRay" Villafuerte, governor of Camarines Sur (2004–2013), representative of the 2nd district (2016–present). Son of Luis Sr. and Nelly.
- Migz Villafuerte, governor (2013–2022), representative of the 5th district (2022–present). Son of LRay.
- Luigi Villafuerte, governor (2022–present). Son of LRay.

=== Villanueva family — Bulacan ===
- Eddie Villanueva - Representative, CIBAC party-list.
- Joel Villanueva - Senator. Son of Eddie.
- Jonjon Villanueva - Mayor. Son of Eddie.

=== Villar family — Las Piñas and Muntinlupa ===
- Manuel "Manny" Villar – representative of the legislative district of Las Piñas–Muntinlupa (1992–1998), legislative district of Las Piñas (1998–2001), speaker (1998–2000), senator (2001–2013), Senate president (2006–2008)
- Cynthia Aguilar-Villar – representative of the legislative district of Las Piñas (2001–2010), senator (2013–2025). Wife of Manuel. Daughter of Filemon Aguilar (see Aguilar family)
- Mark Villar – representative of the legislative district of Las Piñas (2013–2016), secretary of Public Works and Highways (2016–2022), senator (2022–present)
- Camille Villar – representative of the legislative district of Las Piñas (2019–2025), senator (2025–present). Daughter of Manny and Cynthia.

=== Villareal family — Capiz ===
- Cornelio T. Villareal Sr. – House speaker
- Roy Villareal-Señeres – ambassador; National Labor Relations Commission chairman
- Christian Señeres – congressman, Buhay Party-List, senatorial candidate–2013 Elections

=== Violago family — Nueva Ecija ===
- Joseph Gilbert F. Violago – representative of the 2nd district (2007–2016, 2022–2025)

== Y ==
=== Yabut family – Makati ===
- Nemesio Yabut – Mayor of Makati (1972–1986)

=== Yap family — Tarlac ===
- Jose "Aping" Yap Sr.; mayor of Victoria, 1952–1955; congressman, second district 1965–1972, 1987–1998 and 2007–2010; governor, 1998–2007
- Victor Yap; governor, 2007–2016; vice mayor of Victoria, 1988–1998; son of Aping
- Susan Yap-Sulit; congressman, second district 2010–2016; governor 2016–2025; mayor of Tarlac City 2025–present; daughter of Aping
- Christian Yap; mayor of Victoria 2019–2022; congressman, second district 2022–2025; governor 2025–present; son of Susan
- Rolando Ledesma Macasaet; SSS-GSIS Partylist Congressman since 2025; son in-law of Aping; governor, 2025–present (Former GSIS President and SSS President.)

Emilio "Mico" Yap Macasaet is a Filipino public servant and politician serving as a Councilor of San Jose, Tarlac and an ex-officio Board Member of the Sangguniang Panlalawigan (Provincial Board) of Tarlac until 2028. Son of Cong. Rolando Macasaet and of Cristina Areno Yap.

=== Yllana family — Parañaque ===
- Anjo Yllana – councilor, 5th district of Quezon City, 2013–2019; vice mayor, 2004–2007; councilor, 1998–2004
- Jomari Yllana – councilor, 1st district, 2016–present

=== Ynares family — Rizal ===
- Casimiro Martin Ynares Jr. – mayor of Binangonan (1971–1986; 1988–1992), governor (1992–2001; 2004–2007), presidential adviser for Southern Tagalog (2021–2022)
- Rebecca Alcantara-Ynares, governor (2001–2004; 2013–2022). Wife of Casimiro Jr.
- Nina Ynares – governor (2022–present)
- Casimiro "Jun" Ynares III – governor (2007–2013), mayor of Antipolo (2013–2019; 2022–present)
- Mia Ynares – representative of the First District (2025–present)
- Rhea Rivera Ynares – mayor of Binangonan (2025–present)

=== Yu family — Zamboanga del Sur ===
- Victor Yu – governor (2019–2025), representative from the First District (2007–2016)
- Divina Grace Yu, governor (2025–present), representative from the First District (2016–2025), vice mayor of Pagadian (2013–2016). Wife of Victor.
- Jeyzel Victoria Yu, representative from the Second District (2022–present). Daughter of Victor and Divina Grace.
- Joseph Yu, representative from the First District (2025–present). Son of Victor and Divina Grace.

== Z ==
=== Zamora family — San Juan and Taguig ===
- Ronaldo "Ronnie" B. Zamora – member of the Presidential Economic Staff; Assistant Executive Secretary; presidential assistant for Legal Affairs; Executive Secretary; representative of San Juan
- Francis Zamora – vice mayor of San Juan (2010–2016); mayor of San Juan (2019–present); son of Ronaldo B. Zamora
- Ysabel Zamora – representative of lone district of San Juan (2022–present); daughter of Ronaldo
- Pammy Zamora – councilor (2013–2016; 2019–2022); representative of lone district of Taguig (2022–present); daughter of Ronaldo, sister of Ysabel and Francis Zamora

=== Zamora — Davao de Oro ===
- Manuel E. Zamora, congressman and vice governor
- Maricar Zamora, daughter of Manuel Zamora, congresswoman for Davao de Oro 1st District

=== Ziga family — Albay ===
- Tecla San Andres Ziga – congresswoman of the First District (1956–1961), senator (1963–1969)
- Victor Ziga – assemblyman (1984–1986), senator (1987–1992)

=== Zubiri family — Bukidnon ===
- Jose Maria R. Zubiri Jr. – governor
- Migz Zubiri – senator (2007–2011, 2016–present); son of Jose Maria
- Jose Zubiri III – representative, 3rd District
- Audrey Zubiri – representative, 3rd District

== See also ==
- Political families of the Philippines
- List of political families
- Politics of the Philippines
- Corruption in the Philippines
