= 2010 Central Visayas local elections =

Local elections were held in Central Visayas on May 10, 2010, as part of the 2010 Philippine general election.

== Bohol ==
=== Governor ===
Incumbent governor Erico Aumentado ran for the House of Representatives in Bohol's 2nd district as an independent. Representative Edgar Chatto of Lakas–Kampi–CMD won the election.

Candidate	Party	Votes	%
Edgar Chatto	Lakas–Kampi–CMD	218,560	40.64
Julius Caesar Herrera	Nacionalista Party	162,510	30.22
Cesar Montano	Liberal Party	149,771	27.85
Eunice Campo	Philippine Green Republican Party	5,304	0.99
Jetur Ramada	Independent	1,585	0.29
Total		537,730	100.00
Valid votes		537,730	88.08
Invalid/blank votes		72,764	11.92
Total votes		610,494	100.00
Lakas–Kampi–CMD gain from Independent			
Source: Commission on Elections

=== Vice Governor ===
Term-limited incumbent vice governor Julius Caesar Herrera of the Nacionalista Party ran for Governor of Bohol. The Nacionalista Party nominated provincial administrator Tomas Abapo Jr., who was defeated by former provincial board member Concepcion Lim of Lakas–Kampi–CMD.

Candidate	Party	Votes	%
Concepcion Lim	Lakas–Kampi–CMD	169,363	35.35
Tomas Abapo Jr.	Nacionalista Party	158,078	33.00
Elpidio Jala	Liberal Party	137,516	28.70
Cresencio Alturas	Independent	14,110	2.95
Total		479,067	100.00
Valid votes		479,067	78.47
Invalid/blank votes		131,427	21.53
Total votes		610,494	100.00
Lakas–Kampi–CMD gain from Nacionalista Party			
Source: Commission on Elections

=== Provincial Board ===
The Bohol Provincial Board is composed of 13 board members, 10 of whom are elected.

Party	Votes	%	Seats
Lakas–Kampi–CMD	457,988	37.18	5
Nacionalista Party	424,481	34.46	3
Liberal Party	151,185	12.27	0
PDP–Laban	80,929	6.57	1
Independent	117,380	9.53	1
Total	1,231,963	100.00	10
Total votes	610,494	–	
Source: Commission on Elections

==== 1st district ====
Candidate	Party	Votes	%
Cesar Tomas Lopez	PDP–Laban	80,929	20.16
Abeleon Damalerio	Lakas–Kampi–CMD	64,248	16.00
Venzencio Arcamo	Lakas–Kampi–CMD	55,196	13.75
Danilo Bantugan	Nacionalista Party	52,151	12.99
Doris Obena	Nacionalista Party	41,708	10.39
Raul Barbarona	Independent	41,194	10.26
Nemesio Monton	Liberal Party	37,268	9.28
Cirilo Esperanza Jr.	Liberal Party	14,114	3.52
Zeus Manuel Descallar	Liberal Party	9,846	2.45
Rodolf Cañizares	Independent	4,776	1.19
Total		401,430	100.00
Total votes		201,884	–
Source: Commission on Elections

==== 2nd district ====
Candidate	Party	Votes	%
Josephine Jumamoy	Lakas–Kampi–CMD	78,855	25.00
Gerardo Garcia	Nacionalista Party	71,035	22.52
Romulo Cepedoza	Lakas–Kampi–CMD	47,378	15.02
Feliberto Camacho	Nacionalista Party	34,603	10.97
Mutya Kismet Macuno	Lakas–Kampi–CMD	30,479	9.66
Wenceslao Garcia	Liberal Party	23,809	7.55
Eliseo Boyles	Liberal Party	19,197	6.08
Luciano Bentulan Jr.	Liberal Party	10,127	3.21
Total		315,483	100.00
Total votes		194,765	–
Source: Commission on Elections

==== 3rd district ====
Candidate	Party	Votes	%
Dionisio Balite	Nacionalista Party	112,270	21.80
Bienvenido Molina Jr.	Nacionalista Party	79,045	15.35
Godofreda Tirol	Independent	64,512	12.53
Brigido Imboy	Lakas–Kampi–CMD	54,287	10.54
Josil Trabajo	Lakas–Kampi–CMD	45,507	8.84
Aster Piollo	Lakas–Kampi–CMD	42,039	8.16
Senen Lloren	Lakas–Kampi–CMD	39,999	7.77
Florencia Garcia	Liberal Party	36,824	7.15
Felix Casingcasing Sr.	Nacionalista Party	33,669	6.54
Eduardo Enerio	Independent	6,898	1.34
Total		515,050	100.00
Total votes		213,845	–
Source: Commission on Elections

== Cebu ==
=== Governor ===
Incumbent governor Gwendolyn Garcia of Lakas–Kampi–CMD won re-election to a third term.

Candidate	Party	Votes	%
Gwendolyn Garcia	Lakas–Kampi–CMD	639,587	53.50
Hilario Davide III	Liberal Party	543,246	45.44
Godofredo Berizo	Philippine Green Republican Party	7,757	0.65
Rafael Jun Ajoc	Independent	4,806	0.40
Total		1,195,396	100.00
Valid votes		1,195,396	87.51
Invalid/blank votes		170,579	12.49
Total votes		1,365,975	100.00
Lakas–Kampi–CMD hold			
Source: Commission on Elections

=== Vice Governor ===
Incumbent vice governor Gregorio Sanchez Jr. of the Liberal Party won re-election to a third term.

Candidate	Party	Votes	%
Gregorio Sanchez Jr.	Liberal Party	543,924	50.81
Glenn Soco	Lakas–Kampi–CMD	517,687	48.36
Eladia Balicoco	Philippine Green Republican Party	8,959	0.84
Total		1,070,570	100.00
Valid votes		1,070,570	78.37
Invalid/blank votes		295,405	21.63
Total votes		1,365,975	100.00
Liberal Party hold			
Source: Commission on Elections

=== Provincial Board ===
The Cebu Provincial Board is composed of 15 board members, 12 of whom are elected.

Party	Votes	%	Seats
Lakas–Kampi–CMD	731,673	38.03	7
Liberal Party	624,358	32.45	1
Barug Alang sa Kauswagan ug Demokrasya	251,416	13.07	2
One Cebu	81,575	4.24	1
Nacionalista Party	63,458	3.30	1
Pwersa ng Masang Pilipino	29,338	1.52	0
Philippine Green Republican Party	4,306	0.22	0
Independent	137,828	7.16	0
Total	1,923,952	100.00	12
Total votes	1,365,975	–	
Source: Commission on Elections

==== 1st district ====
Candidate	Party	Votes	%
Julian Daan	Lakas–Kampi–CMD	156,341	42.08
Sergio Restauro	Nacionalista Party	63,458	17.08
Juan Bolo	Independent	55,275	14.88
Johnny de los Reyes	Liberal Party	43,855	11.80
Delhia Tiu	Liberal Party	38,677	10.41
Eduardo Adlawan	Independent	13,948	3.75
Total		371,554	100.00
Total votes		260,223	–
Source: Commission on Elections

==== 2nd district ====
Candidate	Party	Votes	%
Peter John Calderon	Lakas–Kampi–CMD	83,870	29.55
Wilfredo Caminero	Lakas–Kampi–CMD	77,778	27.40
Carmiano Kintanar	Liberal Party	52,013	18.33
Orvi Ortega	Liberal Party	51,102	18.00
Oliveros Kintanar	Independent	19,071	6.72
Total		283,834	100.00
Total votes		213,663	–
Source: Commission on Elections

==== 3rd district ====
Candidate	Party	Votes	%
Caesar Ian Zambo	Lakas–Kampi–CMD	95,525	27.50
Alex Binghay	Lakas–Kampi–CMD	92,508	26.63
Victoria Corominas	Liberal Party	92,289	26.57
Estrella Yapha	Liberal Party	64,464	18.56
Richard Alfajora	Independent	2,557	0.74
Total		347,343	100.00
Total votes		231,830	–
Source: Commission on Elections

==== 4th district ====
Candidate	Party	Votes	%
Sun Shimura	Lakas–Kampi–CMD	90,548	29.08
Joven Mondigo Jr.	Lakas–Kampi–CMD	88,340	28.37
Mariano Martinez	Liberal Party	74,986	24.08
Jose de Leon Jr.	Liberal Party	55,379	17.78
Juanito Escala	Independent	2,141	0.69
Total		311,394	100.00
Total votes		217,038	–
Source: Commission on Elections

==== 5th district ====
Candidate	Party	Votes	%
Agnes Magpale	Barug Alang sa Kauswagan ug Demokrasya	148,317	46.76
Jude Thaddeus Sybico	Barug Alang sa Kauswagan ug Demokrasya	103,099	32.50
Jose Jimini Lao	Liberal Party	18,525	5.84
Luis Reyes Jr.	Pwersa ng Masang Pilipino	15,556	4.90
Doris Arquillano	Pwersa ng Masang Pilipino	13,782	4.35
Joseph Malaluan	Liberal Party	13,606	4.29
Joel Solon	Philippine Green Republican Party	4,306	1.36
Total		317,191	100.00
Total votes		241,479	–
Source: Commission on Elections

==== 6th district ====
Candidate	Party	Votes	%
Thadeo Ouano	One Cebu	81,575	27.88
Arleigh Sitoy	Liberal Party	66,746	22.81
Edmund Sanchez	Liberal Party	52,716	18.01
Wenceslao Gakit	Lakas–Kampi–CMD	46,763	15.98
Elmer Cabahug	Independent	44,836	15.32
Total		292,636	100.00
Total votes		201,742	–
Source: Commission on Elections

== Cebu City ==
=== Mayor ===
Term-limited incumbent mayor Tomas Osmeña of the Liberal Party ran for the House of Representatives in Cebu City's 2nd district. The Liberal Party nominated vice mayor Mike Rama, who won the election.

Candidate	Party	Votes	%
Mike Rama	Liberal Party	210,520	58.42
Alvin Garcia	Kugi Uswag Sugbo	120,327	33.39
Georgia Osmeña	Lakas–Kampi–CMD	16,620	4.61
John Henry Osmeña	Independent	8,178	2.27
Salvador Solima	Philippine Green Republican Party	1,867	0.52
Crisologo Saavedra	Independent	1,171	0.32
Rodolfo Laconza	Independent	471	0.13
Cristituto Abangan	Independent	437	0.12
Anastacio dela Cruz	Independent	423	0.12
Fermiliano Dapitan	Independent	324	0.09
Total		360,338	100.00
Valid votes		360,338	94.18
Invalid/blank votes		22,252	5.82
Total votes		382,590	100.00
Liberal Party hold			
Source: Commission on Elections

=== Vice Mayor ===
Term-limited incumbent vice mayor Mike Rama of the Liberal Party ran for Mayor of Cebu City. The Liberal Party nominated former PROMDI party-list representative Joy Augustus Young, who won the election.

Candidate	Party	Votes	%
Joy Augustus Young	Liberal Party	226,736	66.25
Rodolfo Cabrera	Kugi Uswag Sugbo	59,990	17.53
Rico Palcuto	Independent	23,074	6.74
Serafin Rama	Laban ng Demokratikong Pilipino	19,164	5.60
Emmanuel Pacquiao	Lakas–Kampi–CMD	8,034	2.35
Jessica Go	Independent	3,473	1.01
Crescente Busalla	Independent	965	0.28
Jovencio Talite Jr.	Philippine Green Republican Party	817	0.24
Total		342,253	100.00
Valid votes		342,253	89.46
Invalid/blank votes		40,337	10.54
Total votes		382,590	100.00
Liberal Party hold			
Source: Commission on Elections

=== City Council ===
The Cebu City Council is composed of 18 councilors, 16 of whom are elected.

Party	Votes	%	Seats
Liberal Party	1,612,453	65.05	16
Kugi Uswag Sugbo	623,993	25.17	0
Lakas–Kampi–CMD	88,994	3.59	0
Philippine Green Republican Party	46,704	1.88	0
Laban ng Demokratikong Pilipino	6,834	0.28	0
Independent	99,896	4.03	0
Total	2,478,874	100.00	16
Total votes	382,590	–	
Source: Commission on Elections

==== 1st district ====
Candidate	Party	Votes	%
Edgardo Labella	Liberal Party	105,338	9.15
Augustus Pe Jr.	Liberal Party	97,546	8.48
Alvin Arcilla	Liberal Party	91,096	7.91
Sisinio Andales	Liberal Party	85,880	7.46
Lea Japson	Liberal Party	84,615	7.35
Alvin Dizon	Liberal Party	82,274	7.15
Noel Eleuterio Wenceslao	Liberal Party	79,247	6.89
Ma. Nida Cabrera	Liberal Party	77,018	6.69
Joel Garganera	Kugi Uswag Sugbo	63,400	5.51
Raymond Alvin Garcia	Kugi Uswag Sugbo	53,818	4.68
Lemar Alcover	Kugi Uswag Sugbo	47,864	4.16
Fritz Quiñanola	Kugi Uswag Sugbo	46,955	4.08
Jerry Guardo	Kugi Uswag Sugbo	46,388	4.03
Danilo Fernan	Kugi Uswag Sugbo	35,859	3.12
James Ang	Independent	32,756	2.85
Felicisimo Rupinta	Independent	28,823	2.50
Emma Cabrera	Lakas–Kampi–CMD	16,817	1.46
Paul Melendez	Kugi Uswag Sugbo	15,300	1.33
Cresistomo Llaguno	Independent	13,222	1.15
Zenica Arcilla	Kugi Uswag Sugbo	13,201	1.15
Alexander Mancao	Lakas–Kampi–CMD	8,946	0.78
James Philip Tionko	Independent	4,761	0.41
Roberto Medina	Independent	4,161	0.36
Josephine Sol	Philippine Green Republican Party	3,402	0.30
Mariter Madrona	Lakas–Kampi–CMD	2,938	0.26
Ramon Perley Pandaan	Lakas–Kampi–CMD	2,706	0.24
Timoteo Emilio Oppus	Independent	2,315	0.20
Feliciano Camomot	Philippine Green Republican Party	2,195	0.19
Almer Andalahao	Philippine Green Republican Party	2,101	0.18
Total		1,150,942	100.00
Total votes		178,859	–
Source: Commission on Elections

==== 2nd district ====
Candidate	Party	Votes	%
Rodrigo Abellanosa	Liberal Party	137,676	10.37
Margarita Osmeña	Liberal Party	126,765	9.55
Eduardo Rama Jr.	Liberal Party	121,340	9.14
Jose Daluz III	Liberal Party	114,603	8.63
Raul Alcoseba	Liberal Party	113,370	8.54
Ronald Cuenco	Liberal Party	102,743	7.74
Richard Osmeña	Liberal Party	97,274	7.33
Roberto Cabarrubias	Liberal Party	95,668	7.20
Eugenio Gabuya Jr.	Kugi Uswag Sugbo	65,026	4.90
Jose Navarro	Kugi Uswag Sugbo	47,591	3.58
Danilo Lim	Kugi Uswag Sugbo	45,081	3.39
Junas Cabarrubias	Kugi Uswag Sugbo	33,538	2.53
Ruben Baculi	Kugi Uswag Sugbo	31,475	2.37
Danilo Teves	Kugi Uswag Sugbo	28,550	2.15
Raul del Rosario Jr.	Kugi Uswag Sugbo	25,126	1.89
Anne Marie Palomo	Kugi Uswag Sugbo	24,821	1.87
Bliss del Mar	Lakas–Kampi–CMD	24,073	1.81
Jocelyn Caballes	Philippine Green Republican Party	23,762	1.79
Nilo Abella	Lakas–Kampi–CMD	15,294	1.15
Daniel Go	Philippine Green Republican Party	5,959	0.45
Jose Delgado	Lakas–Kampi–CMD	5,616	0.42
Silvano Maranga	Lakas–Kampi–CMD	5,219	0.39
Nestor Legaspi Jr.	Independent	4,640	0.35
Fe Bilar	Lakas–Kampi–CMD	4,230	0.32
Victoriano Go	Philippine Green Republican Party	4,009	0.30
Enrique Almaras	Independent	3,527	0.27
Ma. Leonora Durante	Laban ng Demokratikong Pilipino	3,454	0.26
Eleuterio Ubanan	Lakas–Kampi–CMD	3,155	0.24
Eugene Orbita	Philippine Green Republican Party	2,988	0.23
Rabbi Rabanes	Independent	2,968	0.22
Jose Jonathan Asas	Independent	2,723	0.21
Sulpecio Medequillo	Laban ng Demokratikong Pilipino	1,698	0.13
Rajeni Dy	Laban ng Demokratikong Pilipino	1,682	0.13
Demetrio English	Philippine Green Republican Party	1,228	0.09
Alfie Sian	Philippine Green Republican Party	1,060	0.08
Total		1,327,932	100.00
Total votes		203,731	–
Source: Commission on Elections

== Lapu-Lapu City ==
=== Mayor ===
Term-limited incumbent mayor Arturo Radaza of Lakas–Kampi–CMD ran for the House of Representatives in Lapu-Lapu City's lone district. Lakas–Kampi–CMD nominated Radaza's wife, Paz Radaza, who won the election.

Candidate	Party	Votes	%
Paz Radaza	Lakas–Kampi–CMD	70,392	54.22
Junard Chan	Nationalist People's Coalition	34,418	26.51
Isabelito Darnayla	Independent	14,168	10.91
Efrain Pelaez Jr.	Liberal Party	10,434	8.04
Virgilio Cano	Independent	403	0.31
Total		129,815	100.00
Valid votes		129,815	96.41
Invalid/blank votes		4,838	3.59
Total votes		134,653	100.00
Lakas–Kampi–CMD hold			
Source: Commission on Elections

=== Vice Mayor ===
Incumbent vice mayor Mario Amores of Lakas–Kampi–CMD retired. Lakas–Kampi–CMD nominated city councilor Marcial Ycong, who won the election.

Candidate	Party	Votes	%
Marcial Ycong	Lakas–Kampi–CMD	75,246	60.43
Ricardo Amores	Nationalist People's Coalition	36,940	29.67
Eduardo Tojong	Liberal Party	12,333	9.90
Total		124,519	100.00
Valid votes		124,519	92.47
Invalid/blank votes		10,134	7.53
Total votes		134,653	100.00
Lakas–Kampi–CMD hold			
Source: Commission on Elections

=== City Council ===
The Lapu-Lapu City Council is composed of 14 councilors, 12 of whom are elected.

Party	Votes	%	Seats
Lakas–Kampi–CMD	743,314	59.26	12
Nationalist People's Coalition	293,553	23.40	0
Liberal Party	158,396	12.63	0
Pwersa ng Masang Pilipino	4,550	0.36	0
Independent	54,518	4.35	0
Total	1,254,331	100.00	12
Total votes	134,653	–	
Source: Commission on Elections

Candidate	Party	Votes	%
Efren Herrera	Lakas–Kampi–CMD	69,002	5.50
Harry Don Radaza	Lakas–Kampi–CMD	66,420	5.30
Eduardo Cuizon	Lakas–Kampi–CMD	63,884	5.09
Eduardo Patalinjug	Lakas–Kampi–CMD	63,561	5.07
Alexander Gestopa Jr.	Lakas–Kampi–CMD	63,209	5.04
Francisco Senerpida	Lakas–Kampi–CMD	62,174	4.96
Rodolfo Potot	Lakas–Kampi–CMD	61,738	4.92
Queenie Malingin-Ammann	Lakas–Kampi–CMD	61,505	4.90
Melissa Dignos-Vidal	Lakas–Kampi–CMD	59,637	4.75
Cornelio Pahang	Lakas–Kampi–CMD	58,598	4.67
Florito Pozon	Lakas–Kampi–CMD	58,126	4.63
Roque Wagwag	Lakas–Kampi–CMD	55,460	4.42
Lorenzo Igot Jr.	Independent	42,199	3.36
Rufo Bering	Nationalist People's Coalition	31,214	2.49
Rutchell Borbajo	Nationalist People's Coalition	30,125	2.40
Alex Dave Godornes	Nationalist People's Coalition	30,079	2.40
Gregorio Paquibot Jr.	Nationalist People's Coalition	27,690	2.21
Lani Dakay	Nationalist People's Coalition	27,303	2.18
Cesario Silawan	Nationalist People's Coalition	27,279	2.17
Celestino Aying	Nationalist People's Coalition	26,512	2.11
Emiliano Ngujo	Nationalist People's Coalition	25,667	2.05
Ronald Oporto	Nationalist People's Coalition	22,601	1.80
Reynaldo Berdin	Liberal Party	21,732	1.73
Raul Berdon	Nationalist People's Coalition	20,704	1.65
Alan Amodia	Liberal Party	20,398	1.63
Theodoro Tojong	Liberal Party	19,281	1.54
Rodulfo Taneo Sr.	Nationalist People's Coalition	18,523	1.48
Bobbie Cuenca	Liberal Party	15,623	1.25
Thelma Jumao-as	Liberal Party	13,741	1.10
Galicano Arriesgado Jr.	Liberal Party	13,527	1.08
Elmergilio Ybalez	Liberal Party	12,667	1.01
Edward Tan	Independent	12,319	0.98
Fritz Baguio	Liberal Party	12,022	0.96
Jose Monzon Jr.	Liberal Party	9,665	0.77
Antonio Dingcong	Liberal Party	7,424	0.59
Noel Pido	Liberal Party	6,273	0.50
Franklin Camasura	Liberal Party	6,043	0.48
Norma Ebina	Nationalist People's Coalition	5,856	0.47
Cleto Abugan	Pwersa ng Masang Pilipino	4,550	0.36
Total		1,254,331	100.00
Total votes		134,653	–
Source: Commission on Elections

== Mandaue ==
=== Mayor ===
Incumbent mayor Jonas Cortes won re-election to a second term as an independent.

Candidate	Party	Votes	%
Jonas Cortes	Independent	77,082	59.54
Nerissa Soon-Ruiz	Lakas–Kampi–CMD	49,815	38.48
Eugenio Ruiz	Independent	2,557	1.98
Total		129,454	100.00
Valid votes		129,454	96.97
Invalid/blank votes		4,047	3.03
Total votes		133,501	100.00
Independent hold			
Source: Commission on Elections

=== Vice Mayor ===
Incumbent vice mayor Carlo Fortuna of Lakas–Kampi–CMD ran for re-election to a second term, but was defeated by former city councilor Glenn Bercede, who ran as an independent.

Candidate	Party	Votes	%
Glenn Bercede	Independent	70,851	57.15
Carlo Fortuna	Lakas–Kampi–CMD	53,122	42.85
Total		123,973	100.00
Valid votes		123,973	92.86
Invalid/blank votes		9,528	7.14
Total votes		133,501	100.00
Independent gain from Lakas–Kampi–CMD			
Source: Commission on Elections

=== City Council ===
The Mandaue City Council is composed of 14 councilors, 12 of whom are elected.

Party	Votes	%	Seats
Liberal Party	566,882	55.33	10
Lakas–Kampi–CMD	415,693	40.58	2
Independent	41,916	4.09	0
Total	1,024,491	100.00	12
Total votes	133,501	–	
Source: Commission on Elections

Candidate	Party	Votes	%
Diosdado Suico	Liberal Party	63,784	6.23
Beethoven Andaya	Liberal Party	62,704	6.12
Demetrio Cortes	Liberal Party	61,900	6.04
Jose Jefferson Ceniza	Liberal Party	61,437	6.00
Jimmy Lumapas	Liberal Party	61,009	5.96
Nenita Layese	Liberal Party	55,449	5.41
Emmarie Dizon	Lakas–Kampi–CMD	53,242	5.20
Benjamin Basiga	Liberal Party	51,955	5.07
Elstone Dabon	Liberal Party	51,768	5.05
Editha Cabahug	Lakas–Kampi–CMD	49,846	4.87
John Vicor Omolon	Liberal Party	49,204	4.80
Jesus Barz	Liberal Party	47,672	4.65
Amadeo Seno Jr.	Lakas–Kampi–CMD	46,889	4.58
Ma Noeleen Borbajo	Lakas–Kampi–CMD	44,500	4.34
Alfonso Albaño Jr.	Lakas–Kampi–CMD	43,833	4.28
John Soon	Lakas–Kampi–CMD	38,398	3.75
Zaldy Lumapas	Lakas–Kampi–CMD	37,482	3.66
Emiliano Rosal	Lakas–Kampi–CMD	36,092	3.52
Harry Ceniza	Lakas–Kampi–CMD	34,155	3.33
Wilmer Zanoria	Lakas–Kampi–CMD	31,256	3.05
Martin Antonio Quisumbing	Independent	20,324	1.98
Manuel Mayol	Independent	12,635	1.23
Mark Gochioco	Independent	3,081	0.30
Efren Flaminia	Independent	3,023	0.30
Elmo Fegarido	Independent	2,853	0.28
Total		1,024,491	100.00
Total votes		133,501	–
Source: Commission on Elections

== Negros Oriental ==
=== Governor ===
Incumbent governor Emilio Macias of the Nationalist People's Coalition won re-election to a second term.

Candidate	Party	Votes	%
Emilio Macias	Nationalist People's Coalition	237,816	51.98
Jose Baldado	Nacionalista Party	211,235	46.17
Desiderio Mariano	Independent	5,174	1.13
Samuel Torres	Independent	3,276	0.72
Total		457,501	100.00
Valid votes		457,501	82.60
Invalid/blank votes		96,374	17.40
Total votes		553,875	100.00
Nationalist People's Coalition hold			
Source: Commission on Elections

=== Vice Governor ===
Incumbent vice governor Jose Baldado of the Nacionalista Party ran for Governor of Negros Oriental. Dumaguete mayor Agustin Perdices won the election as an independent.

Candidate	Party	Votes	%
Agustin Perdices	Independent	159,030	40.80
Mariant Escaño-Villegas	Lakas–Kampi–CMD	142,457	36.55
German Saraña Jr.	Independent	88,287	22.65
Total		389,774	100.00
Valid votes		389,774	70.37
Invalid/blank votes		164,101	29.63
Total votes		553,875	100.00
Independent gain from Nacionalista Party			
Source: Commission on Elections

=== Provincial Board ===
The Negros Oriental Provincial Board is composed of 13 board members, 10 of whom are elected.

Party	Votes	%	Seats
Liberal Party	408,564	38.16	3
Nationalist People's Coalition	337,950	31.57	4
Lakas–Kampi–CMD	278,191	25.99	3
Nacionalista Party	45,824	4.28	0
Total	1,070,529	100.00	10
Total votes	553,875	–	
Source: Commission on Elections

==== 1st district ====
Candidate	Party	Votes	%
Liland Estacion	Liberal Party	65,436	20.43
Jessica Jane Koppin	Liberal Party	59,599	18.60
Rodolfo Martinez	Liberal Party	55,425	17.30
Joselito Paras	Lakas–Kampi–CMD	47,707	14.89
Lea Bromo	Lakas–Kampi–CMD	46,377	14.48
Ramon Jalandoni	Nacionalista Party	45,824	14.30
Total		320,368	100.00
Total votes		177,446	–
Source: Commission on Elections

==== 2nd district ====
Candidate	Party	Votes	%
Apolinario Arnaiz Jr.	Nationalist People's Coalition	80,889	16.14
Melimore Saycon	Nationalist People's Coalition	77,110	15.38
Saleto Erames	Nationalist People's Coalition	70,094	13.98
Rotelio Lumjod	Nationalist People's Coalition	68,291	13.62
Orlando Remollo	Liberal Party	65,201	13.01
Ernesto Dinopol	Liberal Party	50,224	10.02
Nevino Cardente	Liberal Party	48,901	9.76
Pinky Garces-Itaas	Liberal Party	40,561	8.09
Total		501,271	100.00
Total votes		212,853	–
Source: Commission on Elections

==== 3rd district ====
Candidate	Party	Votes	%
Roel Degamo	Lakas–Kampi–CMD	70,021	28.13
Peve Ligan	Lakas–Kampi–CMD	58,595	23.54
Edmund Dy	Lakas–Kampi–CMD	55,491	22.30
Edita Maria Vera	Nationalist People's Coalition	41,566	16.70
Ranilo Terania	Liberal Party	23,217	9.33
Total		248,890	100.00
Total votes		163,576	–
Source: Commission on Elections

== Siquijor ==
=== Governor ===
Incumbent governor Orlando Fua Jr. of Lakas–Kampi–CMD won re-election to a second term.

Candidate	Party	Votes	%
Orlando Fua Jr.	Lakas–Kampi–CMD	40,491	83.34
Ben Aquino	Liberal Party	8,092	16.66
Total		48,583	100.00
Valid votes		48,583	91.90
Invalid/blank votes		4,280	8.10
Total votes		52,863	100.00
Lakas–Kampi–CMD hold			
Source: Commission on Elections

=== Vice Governor ===
Incumbent vice governor Andre Jesu Cortes of Lakas–Kampi–CMD won re-election to a second term.

Candidate	Party	Votes	%
Andre Jesu Cortes	Lakas–Kampi–CMD	25,698	58.51
Adam Duhaylungsod	Liberal Party	18,222	41.49
Total		43,920	100.00
Valid votes		43,920	83.08
Invalid/blank votes		8,943	16.92
Total votes		52,863	100.00
Lakas–Kampi–CMD hold			
Source: Commission on Elections

=== Provincial Board ===
The Siquijor Provincial Board is composed of nine board members, six of whom are elected.

Party	Votes	%	Seats
Lakas–Kampi–CMD	82,172	69.15	6
Liberal Party	25,404	21.38	0
Independent	11,260	9.48	0
Total	118,836	100.00	6
Total votes	52,863	–	
Source: Commission on Elections

==== 1st district ====
Candidate	Party	Votes	%
Arturo Pacatang	Lakas–Kampi–CMD	16,121	26.21
Arthur Chan	Lakas–Kampi–CMD	14,221	23.12
Joan Antonette Albito	Lakas–Kampi–CMD	13,202	21.46
Emely Gom-os	Liberal Party	12,861	20.91
Epifanio Olpoc	Liberal Party	5,108	8.30
Total		61,513	100.00
Total votes		26,418	–
Source: Commission on Elections

==== 2nd district ====
Candidate	Party	Votes	%
Orville Fua	Lakas–Kampi–CMD	18,966	33.09
Freddie Calibo	Lakas–Kampi–CMD	10,295	17.96
Leonardo Acain	Lakas–Kampi–CMD	9,367	16.34
Remegio Sierras	Independent	8,044	14.03
Roselyn Asok	Liberal Party	7,435	12.97
Pepita Vios	Independent	3,216	5.61
Total		57,323	100.00
Total votes		26,445	–
Source: Commission on Elections
