= 2022 Mandaue local elections =

Election in Mandaue City, Philippines on 2022

2022 Mandaue City mayoral election
← 2019	May 9, 2022	2025 →
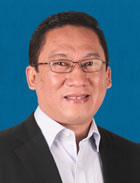
		NPC
Nominee	Jonas Cortes	Nilo Seno
Party	PDP–Laban	NPC
Running mate	Glenn Bercede	Elmer Cabahug
Popular vote	102,786	82,182
Percentage	55.57	44.43
Mayor before election
Jonas Cortes
PDP–Laban
Elected Mayor
Jonas Cortes
PDP–Laban

Local elections were held in Mandaue City on May 9, 2022 within the Philippine general election. Registered voters of the city will be electing candidates for the following elective local posts: mayor, vice mayor, district representative, and twelve councilors. The city has its own congressional district.

== Mayoralty and vice mayoralty elections ==
=== Mayor ===
Incumbent mayor Jonas Cortes is vying for a second term. He is running against former city councilor Nilo Seno.

Mandaue City mayoral election
Party	Candidate	Votes	%
PDP–Laban	Jonas Cortes (incumbent)	102,786	55.57
NPC	Nilo Seno	82,182	44.43
Total votes		184,968	100.00
Margin of victory			

=== Vice mayor ===
Incumbent vice mayor Glenn Bercede is vying for a second term. He is running against former city councilor Elmer Cabahug. Also running is Gepind Requierme.

Mandaue City Vice mayoral election
Party	Candidate	Votes	%
PDP–Laban	Glenn Bercede (incumbent)	110,301	64.42
NPC	Elmer Cabahug	58,535	34.19
Independent	Gepind Requierme	2,387	1.39
Total votes		171,223	100.00
Margin of victory			

== District representative ==
Incumbent representative of 6th congressional district Emmarie Ouano-Dizon is vying to become the first representative of the newly created lone district of Mandaue City and is running unopposed.

2022 Philippine House of Representatives election in Mandaue City's Lone District
Party	Candidate	Votes	%
PDP–Laban	Emmarie Ouano-Dizon	153,004	100.00
Total votes		153,004	100.00

== City Council ==
Party	Votes	%	Seats
Partido Demokratiko Pilipino-Lakas ng Bayan	980,569	63.38	11
Nationalist People's Coalition	460,461	29.76	1
Independent	106,177	6.86	–
Ex officio seats			2
Total	1,547,207	100.00	14

Incumbents are expressed in italics.

=== By ticket ===
==== Partido Demokratiko Pilipino-Lakas ng Bayan/Team Mandaue ====
#	Name	Party
5.	Jesus Arcilla Jr.	PDP–Laban
7.	Mario Bihag	PDP–Laban
11.	Cesar Cabahug Jr.	PDP–Laban
13.	Marie Immaline Cortes-Zafra	PDP–Laban
15.	Oscar Del Castillo Jr.	PDP–Laban
16.	Jennifer Del Mar	PDP–Laban
21.	Andreo Icalina	PDP–Laban
22.	Jimmy Lumapas	PDP–Laban
26.	Cynthia Remedio	PDP–Laban
28.	Malcolm Sanchez	PDP–Laban
29.	Joel Seno	PDP–Laban
31.	Nerissa Corazon Soon-Ruiz	PDP–Laban

==== Nationalist People's Coalition/Bag-ong Mandaue ====
#	Name	Party
3.	Glenn Antigua	NPC
4.	Emery Ciprianne Antigua	NPC
8.	Benwilson Bodo	NPC
9.	Emily Borbon	NPC
10.	Editha Cabahug	NPC
12.	Jose Jefferson Ceniza	NPC
14.	Elstone Dabon	NPC
18.	Dalton Roy Echavez	NPC
24.	Francisco Ouano	NPC
25.	Arthur Remedio	NPC
27.	Leo Saberon	NPC
30.	Paolo Seno	NPC
32.	Fritz Villamor	NPC

==== Independent ====
#	Name	Party
1.	Melchor Alejandro	Independent
2.	Leonardo Alidani	Independent
6.	Benjamin Basiga	Independent
17.	Richard Duaman	Independent
19.	Edsel Ian Fuentes	Independent
20.	Estrella Gesta	Independent
23.	Cirilo Oplado	Independent

=== By district ===
- Key: Italicized: incumbent

City Council election at Mandaue City's lone district
Party	Candidate	Votes	%
PDP–Laban	Nerissa Corazon Soon-Ruiz	103,067	52.07
PDP–Laban	Malcolm Sanchez	95,273	48.14
PDP–Laban	Jimmy Lumapas	90,817	45.88
PDP–Laban	Jesus Arcilla Jr.	87,637	44.28
PDP–Laban	Marie Immaline Cortes-Zafra	83,561	42.22
PDP–Laban	Cynthia Remedio	82,361	41.61
PDP–Laban	Jennifer Del Mar	77,761	39.29
PDP–Laban	Joel Seno	77,237	39.02
PDP–Laban	Cesar Cabahug Jr.	75,506	38.15
PDP–Laban	Andreo Icalina	71,160	35.95
NPC	Editha Cabahug	69,849	35.29
PDP–Laban	Oscar Del Castillo Jr.	68,880	34.80
PDP–Laban	Mario Bihag	67,309	34.01
NPC	Jose Jefferson Ceniza	63,023	31.84
NPC	Fritz Villamor	62,312	31.48
NPC	Francisco Ouano	56,965	28.78
Independent	Benjamin Basiga	42,070	21.26
NPC	Elstone Dabon	37,314	18.85
NPC	Arthur Remedio	27,788	14.04
NPC	Dalton Roy Echavez	24,760	12.51
NPC	Leo Saberon	24,556	12.41
NPC	Benwilson Bodo	23,629	11.94
NPC	Glenn Antigua	22,915	11.58
NPC	Paolo Seno	19,790	10.00
Independent	Melchor Alejandro	18,569	9.38
Independent	Edsel Ian Fuentes	14,945	7.55
NPC	Emily Borbon	13,956	7.05
NPC	Emery Ciprianne Antigua	13,604	6.87
Independent	Richard Duaman	8,596	4.34
Independent	Leonardo Alidani	7,863	3.97
Independent	Estrella Gesta	7,396	3.74
Independent	Cirilo Oplado	6,738	3.40
Total votes		1,547,207	100.00
