= List of members of the House of Representatives of the Philippines (Q) =

This is a complete list of past and present members of the House of Representatives of the Philippines whose last names begin with the letter Q.

This list also includes members of the Philippine Assembly (1907–1916), the Commonwealth National Assembly (1935–1941), the Second Republic National Assembly (1943–1944) and the Batasang Pambansa (1978–1986).

- Manuel L. Quezon, member for Tayabas's 1st district (1907–1909)
- Rogelio Quiambao, member for Region IV (1978–1984)
- Teogenes Quiaoit, member for Ilocos Norte's 2nd district (1912–1916)
- Troadio Quiazon Jr., Cabinet member (1978–1984)
- Miro Quimbo, member for Marikina's 2nd district (2010–2019, 2025–present)
- Stella Quimbo, member for Marikina's 2nd district (2019–2025)
- Allen Quimpo, member for Aklan (1992–2001)
- Romualdo Quimpo, member for Davao (1935–1938, 1943–1944)
- Hjalamar Quintana, member for Quezon (1984–1986)
- Juan Quintos, member for Cagayan's 2nd district (1912–1916)
- Ricardo Quintos, member for Occidental Mindoro (2000–2001)
- Demetrio Quirino, member for Nueva Vizcaya (1943–1944)
- Elpidio Quirino, member for Ilocos Sur's 1st district (1919–1922)
- Alejandro Quirologico, member for Ilocos Sur (1943–1944)
- Gabriel Luis Quisumbing, member for Cebu's 6th district (2010–2016)
