= Alfredo Ouano =

Filipino politician (1924–2014)

4th Mayor of Mandaue City
- In office 1988–1998
- Preceded by: Resitituto Soon
- Succeeded by: Thadeo Ouano

Personal details
- Born: October 14, 1924 Mandaue, Cebu, Philippine Islands
- Died: November 7, 2014 (aged 90) Cebu City, Philippines
- Party: Lakas-NUCD (1989-1998)

Alfredo "Ingko Pedong" Mendoza Ouano (October 14, 1924 – November 7, 2014) was a three term mayor of Mandaue City. He also sat on One Cebu's Council of Elders. His grandest achievement was the Mandaue Reclamation Project now known as a bustling business district of northern Metro Cebu.

== Political Descendants ==
Ouano is the father of politician Thadeo Ouano, who was also mayor of Mandaue.

His granddaughter Emmarie Ouano-Dizon is currently a member of the House of Representatives representing Mandaue's at-large congressional district. His grandson Thadeo Jovito "Jonkie" Ouano is now the Mayor of Mandaue City. Other grandsons include Alfie Ouano, a councilor of Consolacion, Cebu and Anjong Ouano-Icalina, a councilor of Mandaue.

== Death ==
Ouano died on November 7, 2014, at the Perpetual Succour Hospital in Cebu City. He was 90.
