= Cebu's 6th congressional district =

Legislative district of the Philippines

- Constituency for the House of Representatives of the Philippines
- Boundary of Cebu's 6th congressional district in Cebu

- Location of Cebu within the Philippines
- Province: Cebu
- Region: Central Visayas
- Population: 218,607 (2020)
- Electorate: 153,450 (2025)
- Major settlements: 2 LGUs: Municipalities; Consolacion; Cordova
- Area: 89.05 km^{2} (34.38 sq mi)

Current constituency
- Created: 1907
- Representative: Daphne Lagon
- Political party: NUP; 1CEBU
- Congressional bloc: Majority

Cebu's 6th congressional district is one of the seven congressional districts of the Philippines in the province of Cebu. It has been represented in the House of Representatives of the Philippines since 1916 and earlier in the Philippine Assembly from 1907 to 1916. The district consists of the eastern municipalities of Consolacion and Cordova, and previously included the city of Lapu-Lapu until 2010 and the city of Mandaue until 2022. Prior to its second dissolution in 1972, it encompassed the western municipalities of Aloguinsan, Barili, Dumanjug, Pinamungajan, and Ronda, and the city of Toledo. It is currently represented in the 20th Congress by Daphne Lagon of the National Unity Party (NUP) and One Cebu (1CEBU).

== Representation history ==
#	Image	Member	Term of office		Legislature	Party	Electoral history	Constituent LGUs
#	Image	Member	Start	End	Legislature	Party	Electoral history	Constituent LGUs
=== Cebu's 6th district for the Philippine Assembly ===
District created January 9, 1907.
1		Casiano Causing	October 16, 1907	October 16, 1909	1st	Nacionalista	Elected in 1907.	1907–1916; Aloguinsan, Barili, Dumanjug, Pinamungajan, Toledo
2		Vicente Lozada	October 16, 1909	October 16, 1916	2nd	Nacionalista	Elected in 1909.	1907–1916; Aloguinsan, Barili, Dumanjug, Pinamungajan, Toledo
2		Vicente Lozada	October 16, 1909	October 16, 1916	3rd	Nacionalista	Re-elected in 1912.	1907–1916; Aloguinsan, Barili, Dumanjug, Pinamungajan, Toledo
=== Cebu's 6th district for the House of Representatives of the Philippine Islands ===
3		Miguel Raffiñan	October 16, 1916	June 6, 1922	4th	Nacionalista	Elected in 1916.	1916–1935; Aloguinsan, Barili, Dumanjug, Pinamungajan, Ronda, Toledo
3		Miguel Raffiñan	October 16, 1916	June 6, 1922	5th	Nacionalista	Re-elected in 1919.	1916–1935; Aloguinsan, Barili, Dumanjug, Pinamungajan, Ronda, Toledo
4		Nicolas Rafols	June 6, 1922	June 2, 1925	6th	Demócrata	Elected in 1922.	1916–1935; Aloguinsan, Barili, Dumanjug, Pinamungajan, Ronda, Toledo
5		Pastor B. Noel	June 2, 1925	June 5, 1928	7th	Nacionalista; Consolidado	Elected in 1925.	1916–1935; Aloguinsan, Barili, Dumanjug, Pinamungajan, Ronda, Toledo
(4)		Nicolas Rafols	June 5, 1928	June 2, 1931	8th	Demócrata	Elected in 1928.	1916–1935; Aloguinsan, Barili, Dumanjug, Pinamungajan, Ronda, Toledo
(3)		Miguel Raffiñan	June 2, 1931	June 5, 1934	9th	Nacionalista; Consolidado	Elected in 1931.	1916–1935; Aloguinsan, Barili, Dumanjug, Pinamungajan, Ronda, Toledo
(4)		Nicolas Rafols	June 5, 1934	September 16, 1935	10th	Nacionalista; Demócrata Pro-Independencia	Elected in 1934.	1916–1935; Aloguinsan, Barili, Dumanjug, Pinamungajan, Ronda, Toledo
#	Image	Member	Term of office		National Assembly	Party	Electoral history	Constituent LGUs
#	Image	Member	Start	End	National Assembly	Party	Electoral history	Constituent LGUs
=== Cebu's 6th district for the National Assembly (Commonwealth of the Philippines) ===
(4)		Nicolas Rafols	September 16, 1935	December 30, 1938	1st	Nacionalista; Demócrata Pro-Independencia	Re-elected in 1935.	1935–1941; Aloguinsan, Barili, Dumanjug, Pinamungajan, Ronda, Toledo
(3)		Miguel Raffiñan	December 30, 1938	December 30, 1941	2nd	Nacionalista	Elected in 1938.	1935–1941; Aloguinsan, Barili, Dumanjug, Pinamungajan, Ronda, Toledo
District dissolved into the two-seat Cebu's at-large district for the National Assembly (Second Philippine Republic).
#	Image	Member	Term of office		Common wealth Congress	Party	Electoral history	Constituent LGUs
#	Image	Member	Start	End	Common wealth Congress	Party	Electoral history	Constituent LGUs
=== Cebu's 6th district for the House of Representatives of the Commonwealth of the Philippines ===
District re-created May 24, 1945.
(4)		Nicolas Rafols	June 9, 1945	May 25, 1946	1st	Nacionalista	Elected in 1941.	1945–1946; Aloguinsan, Barili, Dumanjug, Pinamungajan, Ronda, Toledo
#	Image	Member	Term of office		Congress	Party	Electoral history	Constituent LGUs
#	Image	Member	Start	End	Congress	Party	Electoral history	Constituent LGUs
=== Cebu's 6th district for the House of Representatives of the Philippines ===
(4)		Nicolas Rafols	May 25, 1946	May 2, 1947	1st	Nacionalista	Re-elected in 1946. Died.	1946–1972; Aloguinsan, Barili, Dumanjug, Pinamungajan, Ronda, Toledo
6		Manuel A. Zosa	November 11, 1947	December 30, 1953	1st	Nacionalista	Elected in 1947 to finish Rafols's term.	1946–1972; Aloguinsan, Barili, Dumanjug, Pinamungajan, Ronda, Toledo
6		Manuel A. Zosa	November 11, 1947	December 30, 1953	2nd	Nacionalista	Re-elected in 1949.	1946–1972; Aloguinsan, Barili, Dumanjug, Pinamungajan, Ronda, Toledo
7		Santiago Lucero	December 30, 1953	March 1, 1956	3rd	Liberal	Elected in 1953. Election annulled by House electoral tribunal after an electoral protest.	1946–1972; Aloguinsan, Barili, Dumanjug, Pinamungajan, Ronda, Toledo
(6)		Manuel A. Zosa	March 1, 1956	December 30, 1965	3rd	Nacionalista	Declared winner of 1953 elections.	1946–1972; Aloguinsan, Barili, Dumanjug, Pinamungajan, Ronda, Toledo
(6)		Manuel A. Zosa	March 1, 1956	December 30, 1965	4th	Nacionalista	Re-elected in 1957.	1946–1972; Aloguinsan, Barili, Dumanjug, Pinamungajan, Ronda, Toledo
(6)		Manuel A. Zosa	March 1, 1956	December 30, 1965	5th	Nacionalista	Re-elected in 1961.	1946–1972; Aloguinsan, Barili, Dumanjug, Pinamungajan, Ronda, Toledo
8		Amado Arrieta	December 30, 1965	December 30, 1969	6th	Liberal	Elected in 1965.	1946–1972; Aloguinsan, Barili, Dumanjug, Pinamungajan, Ronda, Toledo
(6)		Manuel A. Zosa	December 30, 1969	September 23, 1972	7th	Liberal	Elected in 1969. Removed from office after imposition of martial law.	1946–1972; Aloguinsan, Barili, Dumanjug, Pinamungajan, Ronda, Toledo
District dissolved into the thirteen-seat Region VII's at-large district for the Interim Batasang Pambansa, followed by the six-seat Cebu's at-large district for the Regular Batasang Pambansa.
District re-created February 2, 1987.
9		Vicente de la Serna	June 30, 1987	June 30, 1992	8th	PDP–Laban (Panaghiusa)	Elected in 1987.	1987–2010; Consolacion, Cordova, Lapu-Lapu City, Mandaue
10		Nerissa Soon-Ruiz	June 30, 1992	June 30, 1998	9th	NPC	Elected in 1992.	1987–2010; Consolacion, Cordova, Lapu-Lapu City, Mandaue
10		Nerissa Soon-Ruiz	June 30, 1992	June 30, 1998	10th	Lakas	Re-elected in 1995.	1987–2010; Consolacion, Cordova, Lapu-Lapu City, Mandaue
11		Efren T. Herrera	June 30, 1998	June 30, 2001	11th	LAMMP	Elected in 1998.	1987–2010; Consolacion, Cordova, Lapu-Lapu City, Mandaue
(10)		Nerissa Soon-Ruiz	June 30, 2001	June 30, 2010	12th	NPC (Alayon)	Elected in 2001.	1987–2010; Consolacion, Cordova, Lapu-Lapu City, Mandaue
(10)		Nerissa Soon-Ruiz	June 30, 2001	June 30, 2010	13th	KAMPI	Re-elected in 2004.	1987–2010; Consolacion, Cordova, Lapu-Lapu City, Mandaue
(10)		Nerissa Soon-Ruiz	June 30, 2001	June 30, 2010	14th	Lakas	Re-elected in 2007.	1987–2010; Consolacion, Cordova, Lapu-Lapu City, Mandaue
(10)		Nerissa Soon-Ruiz	June 30, 2001	June 30, 2010	14th	Nacionalista	Re-elected in 2007.	1987–2010; Consolacion, Cordova, Lapu-Lapu City, Mandaue
12		Luigi Quisumbing	June 30, 2010	June 30, 2016	15th	Lakas (1CEBU)	Elected in 2010.	2010–2022; Consolacion, Cordova, Mandaue
12		Luigi Quisumbing	June 30, 2010	June 30, 2016	16th	Liberal	Re-elected in 2013.	2010–2022; Consolacion, Cordova, Mandaue
13		Jonas Cortes	June 30, 2016	June 30, 2019	17th	Liberal	Elected in 2016.	2010–2022; Consolacion, Cordova, Mandaue
13		Jonas Cortes	June 30, 2016	June 30, 2019	17th	PDP–Laban	Elected in 2016.	2010–2022; Consolacion, Cordova, Mandaue
14		Emmarie M. Ouano-Dizon	June 30, 2019	June 30, 2022	18th	PDP–Laban (1CEBU)	Elected in 2019. Redistricted to Mandaue's at-large district.	2010–2022; Consolacion, Cordova, Mandaue
15		Daphne Lagon	June 30, 2022	Incumbent	19th	Lakas (1CEBU)	Elected in 2022.	2022–present Consolacion, Cordova
15		Daphne Lagon	June 30, 2022	Incumbent	20th	NUP (1CEBU)	Re-elected in 2025.	2022–present Consolacion, Cordova

== Election results ==
=== 2025 ===
Candidate	Party	Votes	%
Daphne Lagon (incumbent)	Lakas–CMD	104,768	100.00
Total		104,768	100.00
Valid votes		104,768	82.00
Invalid/blank votes		22,996	18.00
Total votes		127,764	100.00
Registered voters/turnout		153,450	83.26
Lakas–CMD hold			
Source: Commission on Elections

=== 2022 ===
2022 Philippine House of Representatives election in Cebu's 6th District
Party	Candidate	Votes	%
Lakas	Daphne Lagon	82,443	74.80
PPP	Martin Adelino Sitoy	21,210	19.24
Independent	Guillermo Sitoy	5,493	4.98
PROMDI	Ruben Talaboc	643	0.58
Independent	Jay Medrozo	425	0.39
Total votes		110,214	100.00
Lakas gain from PDP–Laban			

=== 2019 ===
2019 Philippine House of Representatives elections
Party	Candidate	Votes	%
PDP–Laban	Emmarie "Lolypop" Ouano-Dizon	177,791	78.93
NPC	Baldomero Estenzo	41,477	18.41
Independent	Walter Dy	5,974	2.65
Total votes		225,242	100.00
PDP–Laban hold			

=== 2016 ===
2016 Philippine House of Representatives elections
Party	Candidate	Votes	%
Liberal	Jonas Cortes	154,524	72.51
1CEBU	Paulus Cañete	58,586	27.49
Total votes		213,110	100.00
Liberal hold			

=== 2013 ===
2013 Philippine House of Representatives elections
Party	Candidate	Votes	%
Liberal	Luigi Quisumbing	125,757	57.98
UNA	Nerissa Soon-Ruiz	71,209	32.83
Valid ballots		196,966	90.80
Invalid or blank votes		19,948	9.20
Total votes		216,914	100.00
Liberal hold			

=== 2010 ===
2010 Philippine House of Representatives elections
Party	Candidate	Votes	%
Lakas–Kampi	Luigi Quisumbing	113,996	61.70
Liberal	Ariston Cortes III	54,979	29.76
Independent	Victor Biaño	15,770	8.54
Total votes		201,742	100.00
Lakas–Kampi gain from Nacionalista			

== See also ==
- Legislative districts of Cebu
