= Nicolas Rafols =

Filipino journalist and legislator (1894–1947)

The Honourable Nicolas Rafols
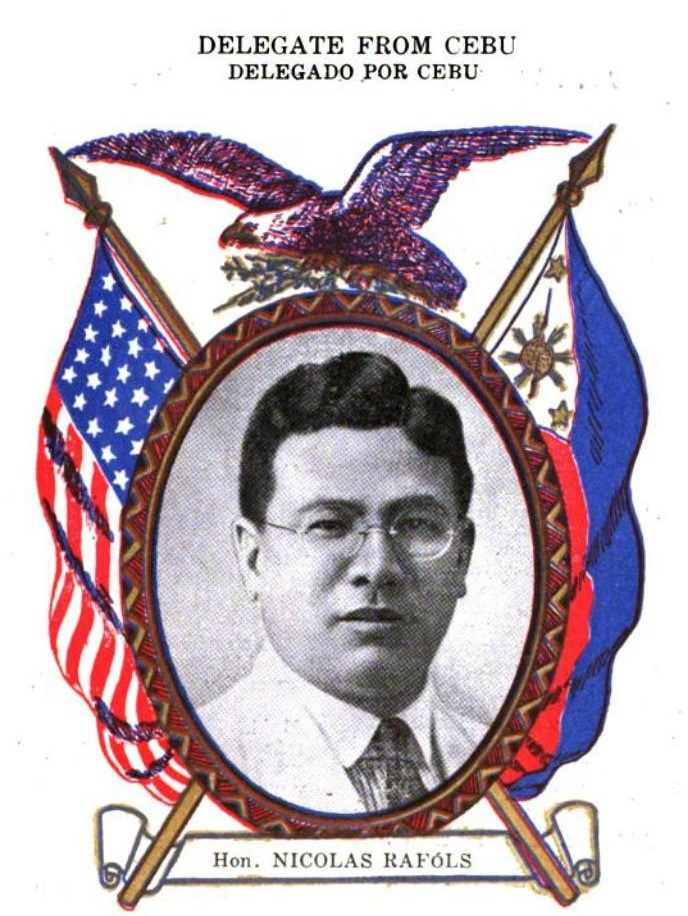
- Rafols as a delegate to the Philippine Constitutional Convention, published by Benipayo Press (c. 1935)

Member of the House of Representatives for Cebu's 6th district
- In office June 6, 1922 – June 2, 1925
- Preceded by: Miguel Raffiñan
- Succeeded by: Pastor Noel
- In office June 5, 1928 – June 2, 1931
- Preceded by: Pastor Noel
- Succeeded by: Miguel Raffiñan
- In office June 5, 1934 – December 30, 1938
- Preceded by: Miguel Raffiñan
- Succeeded by: Miguel Raffiñan
- In office June 9, 1945 – May 2, 1947
- Preceded by: Miguel Raffiñan
- Succeeded by: Manuel Zosa

Personal details
- Born: March 16, 1894 Toledo, Cebu, Captaincy General of the Philippines
- Died: May 2, 1947 (aged 53) Manila, Philippines
- Education: Liceo de Manila; Escuela de Derecho
- Profession: Lawyer; Writer; Journalist

Nicolas Rafols y Mercado (March 16, 1894 – May 2, 1947) was a Filipino Visayan legislator, journalist, businessman, lawyer, and agriculturalist from Cebu, Philippines. He was a member of the House of Representatives for Cebu's 6th District for multiple terms (1922–1925, 1928–1930, 1934–1938, 1945–1947).

== Early life ==
Rafols was born in Toledo, Cebu on March 16, 1894 to Nicolas Rafols and Ignacia Mercado. He went to a public school in Toledo and then studied at Liceo de Manila (1904–1908) with a bachelor of arts degree. Later, he went to study law at Escuela de Derecho in Manila from 1909 until 1911.

== Career ==
As a journalist, he edited several newspapers including El Precursor and El Democrata.

Writing under the pseudonyms Enarem and Niramer, he had written a collection of poetry, Damgo (Feelings), in 1918. Furthermore, he also compiled a collection of Cebuano writing in four volumes named Ang Kalibutan sa Katitikang Binisaya (The World of Visayan Letters) around 1947. However, he died before the work could be published.

His historical fiction, Ang Pulahan, was published in 1919 and was one of the earliest novels in Cebuano literature. It was characterized as exhibiting realist tradition and discussed the rise of the pulahanes or renegade groups against the abuses of the constabulary and against injustices committed by the Americans. Vicente Rama, who was then the publisher of Cebuano Bag-ong Kusog, reviewed the novel, "What I like in this books is that even as its pages are filled with love's sighs, it is not lacking in worthwhile lessons that should be remember by both young and old."

== Political career ==
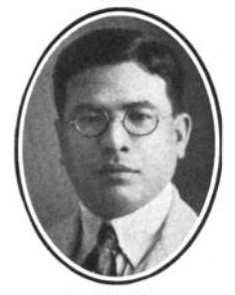
Rafols as member of the House of Representatives, c. 1923

Rafols made his first public appearance at a political meeting held at the Teatro Oriente (the Old Teatro Junquera) on December 20, 1918. Moreover, he was part of the group that organized the Cebu branch of Partido Democrata Nacional, whose political rivals were the Nacionalista Party. In his residence in San Nicolas where the Democrata convention was held on January 15, 1922, he was nominated to be the party's representative for Cebu's 6th congressional district, which at that time was composed of the towns of Aloguinsan, Barili, Dumanjug, Pinamungajan, Ronda, and Toledo.

He ran for elections, won, and served as representative in the 6th Philippine Legislature from 1922 until 1925, 8th Philippine Legislature from 1928 until 1930, and 10th Philippine Legislature from 1934 until 1935. Later on, he was a delegate to the First National Assembly from 1935 to 1938 and a delegate to the 1935 Constitutional Convention. He continued to serve as representative in the 1st Congress of the Commonwealth (1945), 2nd Congress of the Commonwealth which was also known as the 1st Congress of the Republic from 1946 until his untimely death on May 2, 1947. Manuel Zosa succeeded him after winning a special election on November 11, 1947 to serve his unexpired term.

== Published works ==
For his works printed in Bag-ong Kusog, see Cebuano Studies Center.

== Historical commemoration ==
- The Nicolas Rafols Street in Cebu City was named in his honor through the City Ordinance No. 955 in 1976 and City Ordinance No. 973 in 1977. The street is now known as Maria Cristina Street and M.P. Yap Street, respectively, by virtue of a later ordinance.
  - Previously, a Cebu City ordinance enacted in 1968 was supposed to name a street in Espina Village as Nicolas Rafols Street, but was not imposed as city ordinances do not cover private subdivisions.
