= Vicente dela Serna =

Filipino politician (1951-2018)

The Honorable Vicente de la Serna
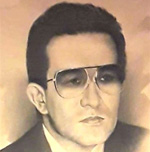

23rd Governor of Cebu
- In office June 30, 1992 – June 30, 1995
- Vice Governor: Apolonio A. Abines Jr.
- Preceded by: Emilio R. Osmeña
- Succeeded by: Pablo P. Garcia

Member of Philippine House of the Representatives from Cebu's 6th congressional district
- In office June 30, 1987 – June 30, 1992
- Preceded by: Vacant (post last held by Manuel Zosa)
- Succeeded by: Nerissa Corazon Soon-Ruiz

Mayor of Mandaue
- In office 1986
- Preceded by: Demetrio Cortes Sr.
- Succeeded by: Restituto Soon

Personal details
- Born: September 13, 1951 Butuan, Agusan del Norte, Philippines
- Died: September 1, 2018 (aged 66) Cebu City, Cebu, Philippines
- Citizenship: Philippine, American
- Party: PDP–Laban (1987–1995)
- Other political affiliations: Panaghiusa (1987–1992)
- Spouse: María Dolores Bernad y Abuton
- Domestic partner: Karina Villegas y Barrica
- Children: Carrie S. de Unchuan, Manu de la Serna
- Occupation: Lawyer; Politician

Vicente de la Serna (September 13, 1951 – September 1, 2018) was a Filipino lawyer and politician. He was Cebu's 6th district's representative to the 8th Congress of the Philippines (1987–1992) and the governor of the province of Cebu from 1992 until 1995.

== Early life ==
The son of Manuel H.P. de la Serna and Philippine-American mestiza Leonora Low y Ancheta, Vicente de la Serna was born in Butuan, Agusan del Norte on September 13, 1951. He was a member of the De la Serna family.

He and his mestiza wife Maria Dolores Bernad y Abutón of Ozamiz, Misamis Occidental had three daughters and a son. He also has a son, Manu, by his partner.

He earned a bachelor's degree from Velez College and a law degree from the University of San Carlos. On May 8, 1980, he was admitted to the bar and became a lawyer.

== Career ==
He was known as an anti-Marcos activist in Cebu in the 1980s and later appointed in charge of the Office of the Mayor of Mandaue City when Corazon Aquino became president after the 1986 EDSA revolution. In 1987, he ran for a legislative seat and won as member of the 8th Congress of the Republic representing Cebu's 6th district. He was chosen as the chairman of the House Committee on Civil, Political, and Human Rights. During his term in Congress, he advocated for social legislation and human rights. He appropriated his Countrywide Development Fund for Mandaue City Hospital, Mandaue Comprehensive High School, Mandaue Sports Complex, and Lapu-lapu City Sports Center.

In 1992, he was elected as governor of Cebu province succeeding Emilio Osmeña and served until 1995. It was during his term that the building of the Sugbo Cultural Center within the University of the Philippines Cebu Campus was started. Additionally, he was credited for the Provincial Board Ordinance 93-1 that identified properties owned by the provincial government but were occupied by about 5,000 informal settlers of Cebu City. Negotiations for a land swap deal between the provincial and city governments that would allow the residents to own the lot by paying a monthly amortization commenced and lasted for over two decades. By August 2018, the deal was finalized.

When he ran to be reelected as governor for a second term, he was defeated and succeeded by Pablo P. Garcia. During the administration of Joseph Estrada, Vicente de la Serna was appointed deputy executive secretary.

== Later years ==
In September 2017, he was diagnosed with lung cancer and underwent chemotherapy. He died succumbing to the disease in Sto. Niño Village in Barangay Banilad, Cebu City, at the age of 66 past midnight of September 1, 2018. Cebu Daily News editorial hailed him as man of the masses, and the Philippine News Agency noted his popularity among the common folks for "championing the causes of the poor and the marginalized."
