= List of Cultural Properties of the Philippines in Barili, Cebu =

Cultural Property wmph identifier (Note: wmph is an internal identifier used by Wikimedia Philippines to identify the monument. This is not an official identifier, and only shown temporarily in the templates until the government creates an updated complete list.)	Site name	Description	Province	City or municipality	Address	Coordinates	Image
	Mariano Ricablanca Ancestral House	constructed during the mid-century by Senor Ricablanca	Cebu	Barili, Cebu			Upload file
	Natalio Abad Ancestral House	constructed during the 1890s, one-storey U-shaped house made up of hardwood	Cebu	Barili, Cebu			Upload Photo
	Eling Alquizola Ancestral House	constructed during the early 1900s, small house that is being supported by 10 wooden posts	Cebu	Barili, Cebu			Upload Photo
	Salvador Trinidad Ancestral House	constructed during the 1870s, reconstructed house that retained the original hardwood floor and walls	Cebu	Barili, Cebu			Upload file
	Panares Ancestral House	constructed during the 1890s, a two-storey house on a coral stone constructed base	Cebu	Barili, Cebu			Upload file
	Las Dos Hermanas	constructed in 1914	Cebu	Barili, Cebu			Upload file
	Tomas Delgado Ancestral House	constructed in 1914	Cebu	Barili, Cebu			Upload file
	Miguel Abad Ancestral House	constructed before World War II	Cebu	Barili, Cebu			Upload file
	Honoria Paras Ancestral House	constructed in 1875	Cebu	Barili, Cebu			Upload Photo
	Nicolas Vergara Ancestral House	constructed in 1875	Cebu	Barili, Cebu			Upload file
	Martiniano Alquizola Ancestral House	constructed during the 1890s	Cebu	Barili, Cebu			Upload file
	Domingo Alcoseba Ancestral House	built circa 1893	Cebu	Barili, Cebu			Upload file
	Hilarion Alquizola Ancestral House	constructed during the 1890s	Cebu	Barili, Cebu			Upload file
	Cipriano Estrada Ancestral House	constructed during the early 1900s	Cebu	Barili, Cebu			Upload Photo
	Restituto Galvez Ancestral House	constructed in 1903	Cebu	Barili, Cebu			Upload Photo
	Maximo Aguilar Ancestral House	constructed during the early 1900s	Cebu	Barili, Cebu			Upload file
	Teofilo Alquizola Ancestral House	constructed during the 1900s	Cebu	Barili, Cebu			Upload Photo
	Isidro Trinidad Ancestral House	constructed during the 1900s	Cebu	Barili, Cebu			Upload file
	Yntong Yap Ancestral House	built circa 1913	Cebu	Barili, Cebu			Upload Photo
	Maria Paras Ancestral House	constructed during the 1900s	Cebu	Barili, Cebu			Upload file
	Vicente Pace Ancestral House	constructed in 1910	Cebu	Barili, Cebu			Upload Photo
	Pedro Salomon Ancestral House	constructed during the early American colonial period	Cebu	Barili, Cebu			Upload Photo
	Tiyong Romero Ancestral House	constructed during the American colonial period	Cebu	Barili, Cebu			Upload Photo
	Dr. Manuel Sanson Ancestral House	constructed in 1931	Cebu	Barili, Cebu			Upload Photo
	Vicente Gonzalez Ancestral House	constructed during the 1920s	Cebu	Barili, Cebu			Upload Photo
	Tiburcio Paras, Jr. Ancestral House	constructed during the mid-1920s	Cebu	Barili, Cebu			Upload Photo
	Jose Paras Ancestral House	constructed during the mid-1920s	Cebu	Barili, Cebu			Upload Photo
	Justo Lozada Ancestral House	constructed in 1936	Cebu	Barili, Cebu			Upload Photo
	Barili Parish Church and Belfry	constructed in 1889	Cebu	Barili, Cebu			Upload file
	Barili Central School	constructed in 1911	Cebu	Barili, Cebu			Upload file
	Old Marketplace of Mantalongon	constructed in 1911	Cebu	Barili, Cebu			Upload Photo
	Old Cebu Maternity Clinic	constructed during the 1920s	Cebu	Barili, Cebu			Upload Photo
	Hospicio de San Jose, Barili, Cebu.jpg	constructed in 1925	Cebu	Barili, Cebu			Upload file
	Kapilya ni San Miguel	finished in 1928	Cebu	Barili, Cebu			Upload Photo
	Tiyay's Chicharron House	constructed during the American colonial period	Cebu	Barili, Cebu			Upload Photo
	Bolocboloc Farmers' Training Center	built circa 1926	Cebu	Barili, Cebu			Upload file
	The Abad Camarin	constructed during the 1920s	Cebu	Barili, Cebu			Upload Photo
	Holy Cross	finished during the 1600s	Cebu	Barili, Cebu			Upload Photo
	Dakong Cruz in Parish Cemetery	finished during the 1950s	Cebu	Barili, Cebu			Upload file
	Palalong Memorial Cross	finished circa 2000	Cebu	Barili, Cebu			Upload file
	Immaculate Conception Statue	finished in 1954	Cebu	Barili, Cebu			Upload Photo
	Obispo Gorordo Obelisk	finished in 1909	Cebu	Barili, Cebu			Upload Photo
	Sacred Heart Statue	finished during the 1890s	Cebu	Barili, Cebu			Upload Photo
	Virgin of Lourdes Grotto	finished during the colonial period	Cebu	Barili, Cebu			Upload Photo
	Jose Rizal Statue	finished in 1926	Cebu	Barili, Cebu			Upload Photo
