= Miguel Raffiñan =

Filipino Mayor and Congressman

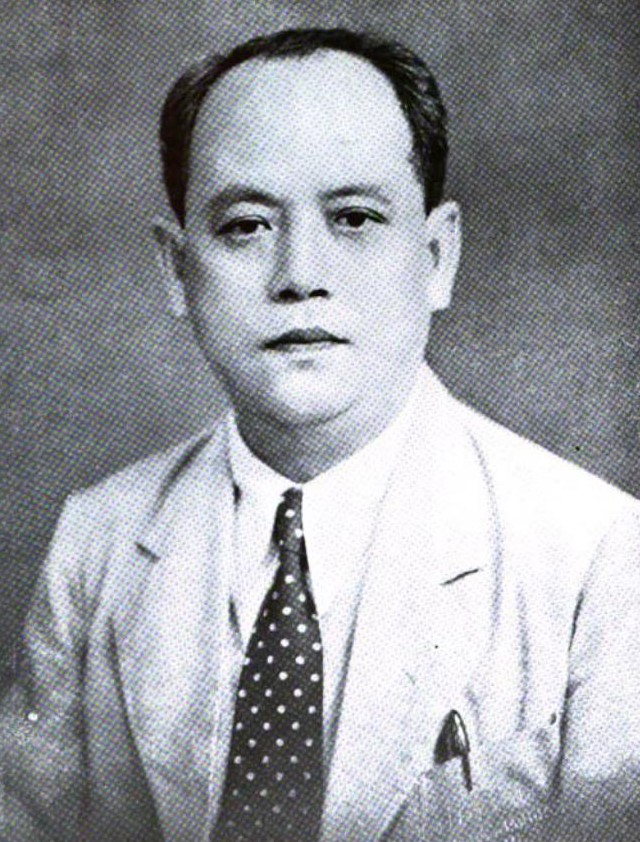
- Photograph from The Commercial & Industrial Manual of the Philippines, 1941

Member of the House of Representatives for Cebu's 6th District
- In office 1916–1922
- Preceded by: Vicente Lozada
- Succeeded by: Nicolas Rafols
- In office 1931–1934
- Preceded by: Nicolas Rafols
- Succeeded by: Nicolas Rafols
- In office 1939–1941
- Preceded by: Nicolas Rafols
- Succeeded by: Nicolas Rafols

Mayor of Cebu City
- In office 1947–1951
- Preceded by: Luis Espina
- Succeeded by: Pedro Bernal Elizalde

Personal details
- Born: May 13, 1891
- Died: Unknown
- Education: University of San Carlos
- Profession: Lawyer

Miguel Garces Raffiñan (born May 13, 1891, date of death unknown) was a Filipino Visayan lawyer, politician and mayor from Cebu, Philippines. He was mayor of Cebu City (1947–1951) and Congressman of Cebu's 6th District (1916–1922, 1931–1934, 1939–1941).

== Early life ==
Miguel Raffiñan, son of Filomeno Raffiñan and Honorata Garces, was born on May 13, 1891. He attended University of San Carlos and acquired a bachelor's degree and became a lawyer on October 2, 1917. He married Visitacion Paras Abad of Barili, Cebu.

== Career ==
=== Journalism ===
He wrote for the Spanish dailies El Precursor, a newspaper founded by Mariano Jesus Cuenco, and La Revolucion, a daily founded by Filemon Sotto.

=== Congressman ===
He was elected Congressman for Cebu's old 6th district in the 4th Philippine Legislature in 1916 and reelected again in 5th Philippine Legislature in 1919 and served until 1922. In 1931, he ran and won again as representative in the same congressional district in the 9th Philippine Legislature and won again in 1939 elections where he served in the 2nd National Assembly until 1941. The 6th congressional district then was composed of the towns of Aloguinsan, Barili, Dumanjug, Pinamungajan, Toledo, and Ronda.

=== World War II ===
Raffiñan participated in the resistance movement during World War II and led the people of Barili in the fight against the Japanese colonizers. The guerilla force in Barili was formed by Lieutenant Aguasin and Domingo Gutang on September 27, 1942.

=== Mayor ===
On September 6, 1947, he became mayor of Cebu City until 1951, succeeding Dr. Luis Espina.

During his term, he was responsible in the repair and reconstruction of the four-story, colonnaded Cebu City Hall with War Damage Funds. Additionally, the first radio telephone circuit established between Manila and Cebu was inaugurated on March 1, 1950, under the term of then President Elpidio Quirino, with the first official three-minute conversation between then former President Sergio Osmeña and Raffiñan.

In 1947, the city council passed an ordinance exacting fees on each ticket sold in local theaters. Theater owners filed a complaint against the city in court with Raffiñan, then city treasurer Anatolio Ynclino, and acting city treasurer Jesus E. Zabate as respondents. On February 18, 1956, the Supreme Court ruled that the city did not have the power to enforce the ordinance and denied the demand of plaintiffs to recover the fees that were already collected.

Raffiñan would later be replaced by Pedro Elizalde as mayor.

=== Legal practice ===
As a lawyer, he represented the Sampaguita Shoe and Slipper Factory in a suit against the Bureau of Customs and the Court of Tax Appeals that was decided by the Supreme Court.

== Historical commemoration ==
- Previously known as San Jose Street, the Miguel Raffiñan Street in Cebu City was named in his honor by virtue of City Ordinance No. 553 enacted on August 26, 1965.
