= Thadeo Ouano =

Filipino politician

Member of the Cebu Provincial Board from the 6th District
- In office June 30, 2010 – February 26, 2016

5th Mayor of Mandaue City
- In office June 30, 1998 – June 30, 2007
- Preceded by: Alfredo Ouano
- Succeeded by: Amadeo Seno

Personal details
- Born: Thadeo Zambo Ouano; August 14, 1944 Mandaue, Cebu, Commonwealth of the Philippines
- Died: February 26, 2016 (aged 71)
- Party: Liberal (2012–2016)
- Other political affiliations: 1CEBU (2009–2012); Lakas (1998–2009)
- Children: 2, including Lolypop

Thadeo "Teddy" Zambo Ouano (August 14, 1944 – February 26, 2016) was a Filipino politician served as mayor of Mandaue from 1998 until 2007.

A native resident of Mandaue City, Ouano represents the 6th Congressional District in the Sangguniang Panlalawigan of Cebu. He sits as Chairperson of the committees on Environmental Conservation & Natural Resources; and on Ways & Means; as Vice Chairperson of the committees on Public Safety, Peace & Order; Public Services; and Commerce & Industry; and as a member of the committees on Public Affairs & Information; Agriculture & Livelihood; Budget & Appropriations; Human Rights & Labor; and Senior Citizens.

He finished his Bachelor of Science in Business Administration degree in 1971. Prior to that he also studied aeronautics at the Varona Flying School in 1967. He once worked as a bank employee in the country then as an office employee in the US from 1990 to 1997. He was elected mayor of Mandaue City for three terms from 1998 to 2007 before he was elected as number one Provincial Board Member for two terms from 2010 to 2016.

In 2004, the justice department initiated an independent probe into why Ouano's administration had not detected and taken action against a shabu drug lab in Mandaue.

Ouano is the son of Alfredo Ouano, who was also mayor of Mandaue. Ouano's son, Jonkie, ran for mayor in 2007, but was defeated by Jonas Cortes. Jonkie ran for mayor again in 2025, this time defeating Cortes.

Later, Ouano was also one of a number of mayors investigated for improper use of funds used for city improvements (specifically, decorative lampposts) for an Association of Southeast Asian Nations (Asean) conference held in the area in 2007. A crowd of supporters blocked the agent from the initial delivery attempt of the suspension order. Ouano was suspended from his position of mayor, and replaced by acting mayor Amadeo Seno. As of October 2008, the prosecution stated that they lacked sufficient evidence to take the lamppost case to trial, and that the original charges were based on import documents that may turn out to have had falsified prices recorded. which later the office of the Ombudsman dismissed in 2011.

In 2019, the Sandiganbayan has dropped the graft charges against the late Mandaue City mayor Thadeo Ouano accused of corruption in the purchase of “overpriced” lampposts back in 2007. The anti-graft court did not find proof beyond reasonable doubt to support the charges.

Ouano was one of the Cebu Provincial Board members representing the sixth district and was a member of the Liberal Party since 2012. He died of cancer at the age of 70 on February 26, 2016.

He was replaced by his son Thadeo "Jonkie" Ouano as board member of the 6th District of Cebu Province, under the b anner of the One Cebu Party.

In 2019, running under the banner of PDP Laban / One Cebu Party, Jonas Cortes allied with the descendants of Teddy Ouano to form the Cortes-Ouano alliance. Emmarie Ouano-Dizon won as the representative of the sixth district of Cebu of the House of the Representatives.
