= Mandaue's at-large congressional district =

House of Representatives of the Philippines congressional district

- Constituency for the House of Representatives of the Philippines
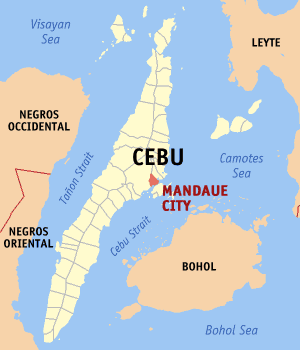
- Location of Mandaue within Cebu
- City: Mandaue
- Region: Central Visayas
- Population: 364,482 (2024)
- Electorate: 236,853 (2025)
- Major settlements: Mandaue
- Area: 34.87 km^{2} (13.46 sq mi)

Current constituency
- Created: 2019
- Representative: Emmarie M. Ouano-Dizon
- Political party: Lakas; 1CEBU
- Congressional bloc: Majority

The Mandaue's at-large congressional district, officially the lone district of Mandaue, is the single representation of the highly urbanized city of Mandaue in the Congress of the Philippines. The city started to be represented in the lower house of the Congress by its lone congressional district after the 2022 elections. It is currently represented in the 20th Congress by Emmarie M. Ouano-Dizon of the Lakas–CMD (Lakas) and One Cebu (1CEBU).

== Representation history ==
#	Image	Member	Term of office		Congress	Party	Electoral history
#	Image	Member	Start	End	Congress	Party	Electoral history
=== Mandaue's at-large district for the House of Representatives of the Philippines ===
District created April 5, 2019.
1		Emmarie M. Ouano-Dizon	June 30, 2022	Incumbent	19th	PDP–Laban (1CEBU)	Redistricted from Cebu's 6th district and re-elected in 2022.
1		Emmarie M. Ouano-Dizon	June 30, 2022	Incumbent	20th	Lakas (1CEBU)	Re-elected in 2025.

== See also ==
- Legislative districts of Cebu
