= Nerissa Soon-Ruiz =

Filipino politician

The Honorable Nerissa Corazon Soon-Ruiz

City Councilor of Mandaue
- Incumbent
- Assumed office June 30, 2019

Member of the Philippine House of Representatives from Cebu's 6th congressional district
- In office June 30, 2001 – June 30, 2010
- Preceded by: Efren T. Herrera
- Succeeded by: Gabriel Luis R. Quisumbing
- In office June 30, 1992 – June 30, 1998
- Preceded by: Vicente L. dela Serna
- Succeeded by: Efren T. Herrera

Personal details
- Born: Nerissa Corazon Cortes Soon-Ruiz; October 31, 1956 (age 69) Mandaue, Cebu
- Party: Lakas (1995–2001; 2007–2010; 2024–present); 1CEBU (2015–present)
- Other political affiliations: PDP (2018–2024); UNA (2012–2015); Nacionalista (2010–2012); KAMPI (2004–2007); NPC (1992–1995; 2001–2004)
- Education: University of the Visayas
- Occupation: Physician, politician

Nerissa Corazon Cortes Soon-Ruiz (born October 31, 1956) is a Filipino politician who currently serves as City Councilor of Mandaue since 2019.

== Life ==
Nerissa Corazon Cortes Soon-Ruiz was born on October 31, 1956, in Mandaue, Cebu, where she still resides to this day. She took up medicine, graduated from the University of the Visayas in Cebu City. Nerissa was previously married to ex-DILG official Joselito Holganza Ruiz and had 3 children together.

== Career ==
Prior to her political career, Soon-Ruiz is a physician by profession, qualifying in 1991. She ran and won as a member of the House of Representatives of the Philippines, representing the Sixth District of Cebu from 1992 to 1998, and from 2001 to 2010.

In 2016, Soon-Ruiz ran for Vice Governor under One Cebu Party, with Gubernatorial Candidate and former GSIS President Winston Garcia as her tandem for the 2016 Philippine Elections, but both lost to Governor Hilario Davide III and Vice Governor Agnes Magpale. She ran for City Councilor of Mandaue under the lineup of Jonas Cortes in 2019, and was elected.

== Suspension ==
In 2020, Soon-Ruiz was suspended for 90 days for pending 34 counts of graft and malversation by the Sandiganbayan over allegations of her Priority Development Assistance Fund (PDAF) allocation to fake non-governmental organizations while serving as a congresswoman from 2007 to 2010.

House of Representatives of the Philippines
| Preceded by Vicente dela Serna | Representative, Sixth District of Cebu; 1992–1998 | Succeeded by Efren T. Herrera |
| Preceded by Efren T. Herrera | Representative, Sixth District of Cebu; 2001–2010 | Succeeded by Gabriel Luis Quisumbing |
