= Emmarie Dizon =

Filipino politician (born 1970)

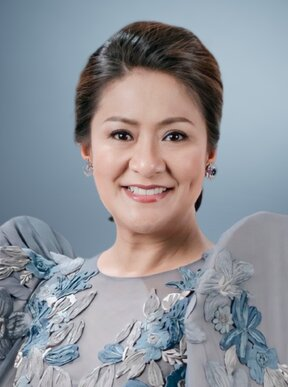
- Official portrait, 2025

Member of the Philippine House of Representatives
- Incumbent
- Assumed office June 30, 2022
- Preceded by: District established
- Constituency: Mandaue
- In office June 30, 2019 – June 30, 2022
- Preceded by: Jonas Cortes
- Succeeded by: Daphne Lagon
- Constituency: 6th District

Member of the Mandaue City Council
- In office June 30, 2010 – June 30, 2016

Personal details
- Born: Emmarie Mabanag Ouano; April 1, 1970 (age 56) Mandaue, Cebu, Philippines
- Party: Lakas (2009–2010; 2023–present); 1CEBU (2015–present)
- Other political affiliations: PDP–Laban (2016–2023); Liberal (2010–2015)
- Spouse: Nixon Dizon
- Children: 2
- Parent: Thadeo Ouano (father)
- Occupation: Politician

Emmarie Mabanag Ouano-Dizon (born April 1, 1970) is a Filipino politician. She is the incumbent representative for Mandaue's Lone District since 2022.

Lolypop, as she is fondly called in her hometown Mandaue, Cebu is one of the grand daughters of Mandaue City former mayor Alfredo Ouano and the only daughter of Mandaue City Mayor and former Cebu Provincial Board member Thadeo "Teddy" Ouano.

== Business career ==
Before joining politics, Lolypop Ouano-Dizon is known as one of the successful serial entrepreneurs in Mandaue. As of 2014, she owns five Jollibee franchises in Cebu and six Red Ribbon Bakeshop franchises.

== Political career ==
=== Mandaue City Councilor ===
==== City Councilor, First Term (2010 - 2013) ====
Born and raised in Barangay Opao, Mandaue Lolypop first run for public office as Mandaue Council Councilor during the 2010 Local Election. She won the sixth seat of the City Councilor of Mandaue.

She advocated for youth development and the advancement of the needs of the senior citizens. She joined Liberal Party together with his father, then Cebu Provincial board member Thadeo Ouano.

==== City Councilor, Second Term (2013- 2016) ====
During the 2013 Philippine General Election, Councilor Ouano-Dizon was elected as the first councilor of the City of Mandaue. In 2014, she made a resolution to assist businesses by extending the deadline of the submission of requirements of the businesses in the city. During the death of former Mayor Pedong Ouano, Lolypop served as the Ouano Family's de facto leader.

=== Bid for Mandaue City Mayoralty Post (2016) ===
In the beginning of 2015, former Mayor Thadeo "Teddy" Ouano has already signified his intent not to run for public office. However, the older Ouano has expressed his desire for the oldest child Lolypop to run for the city's top post.

In October 2015, together with her team Lolypop Sa Masa [10] backed by One Cebu Party of Winston Garcia, Lolypop Ouano-Dizon filed his certificate of candidacy for the Mayoralty seat of Mandaue City on the Cebu local elections, 2016. Three-term councilor Bethoven Andaya is her Vice Mayor running mate. Lolypop's group claim that they are the underdog in the upcoming election. Despite limited resources, the group enjoys wide margin of following according to an independent survey.

==== One Cebu and Anak Sa Mandaue Caravan and Proclamation Rally ====
Lolypop Ouano-Dizon kicked off his campaign trail with a Caravan on April 2. The said caravan was participated by around 700 volunteer motor vehicles and another 200 four wheeled vehicles which composed the 5.2-kilometer-long (3.2 mi) caravan along the city's key streets. During the Lolypop Sa Masa proclamation rally at Opao Gym, Lolypop promises new reclamation and more infrastructure for the city of Cebu. Her success in business made her the "wealthiest" politician to run for Mayor. Lolypop lost to Luigi Quisumbing. His winning of the election is attributed to the alliance made with Cortes.

==== Mandaue Congressional District ====
Lolypop expressed her interest in pushing for more voice in the House of Representatives for the citizens of Mandaue by making the industrial city a lone-congressional district.

=== Congresswoman (2019 - present) ===
Lolypop Ouano-Dizon bid as congressional candidate for Cebu's 6th Congressional District under PDP-Laban / One Cebu Coalition, during the 2019 Philippine Election. Under her leadership, Anak Sa Mandaue—the organization she formed in 2016, allied with Jonas Cortes to form the Cortes-Ouano Alliance which led to the coalitions 100% victory against Luigi Quisumbing and his newly formed Hugpong Mandaue.

She was elected and proclaimed as the elected representative of the 6th district with a super-majority of 79% of the total votes count.

During the oathtaking of Congresswoman Emmarie M. Ouano-Dizon paid tribute to her late grandfather, former Mandaue City Mayor Alfredo "Pedong" Ouano, and father Thadeo "Teddy" Ouano. more than 500 public figures witnessed the oathtaking, which was headed by Presidential Legislative Liaison Office Secretary Adelino Sitoy, One Cebu Leaders led by Cebu Governor Gwen Garcia, and incoming Mandaue City Mayor Jonas Cortes, Cordova Mayor Teche Sitoy-Cho and Consolacion Mayor Joannes Alegado.

Dizon is Lakas–CMD regional chairperson.

In 2022, Mandaue separated from Cebu's sixth district and became its own congressional district.

==== Controversies ====
In September 2024, radio broadcaster, Edward Dela Cerna Ligas filed with the Ombudsman Visayas multiple cases of plunder, graft, corruption, falsification of public documents, and 9 counts of SALN falsification against Dizon and her husband, PDP-Laban Cebu Provincial President Nixon "Jojo" Dizon.

== Personal life ==
Lolypop Ouano-Dizon is married to PDP-Laban Cebu Provincial President Nixon "Jojo" Dizon, and the mother of young professionals Joshua and Maica. Ouano-Dizon prefers to use a hyphenated surname consisting of both her maiden surname "Ouano" and her husband's surname "Dizon". She has expressed disappointment in her early political career when she is referred to as "Councilor Dizon" or "Mrs. Dizon" in all functions, communications, documents and records of the city. She wants to honor her father and other Ouano descendants by using a hyphenated name.
