= Mandaue City Council =

Legislative body of the city of Mandaue, Philippines

Mandaue City Council Sangguniang Panlungsod ng Mandaue
- 17th Mandaue City Council
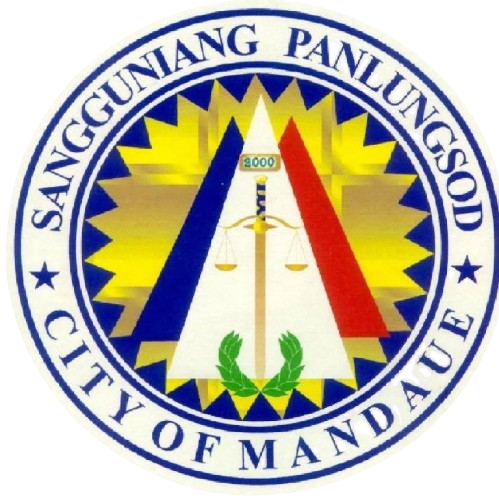

Type
- Type: Unicameral
- Term limits: 3 terms (9 years)

Leadership
- Presiding Officer: Glenn O. Bercede, 1-Cebu
- Floor Leader: Jimmy C. Lumapas, 1-Cebu

Structure
- Seats: 15 councilors (including 2 ex officio members); 1 ex officio presiding officer
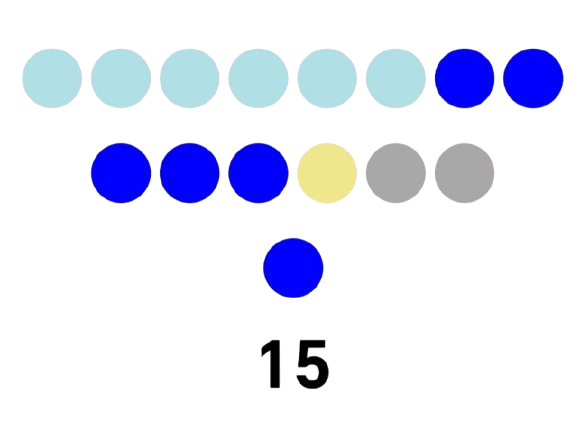
- Political groups: Lakas (6) 1-Cebu (6) Liberal (1) Nonpartisan (2)
- Length of term: 3 years
- Authority: Mandaue City Charter; Local Government Code of the Philippines

Elections
- Voting system: Plurality-at-large voting (12 seats)
- Last election: May 12, 2025
- Next election: May 8, 2028

The Mandaue City Council (Filipino: Sangguniang Panlungsod ng Mandaue) is Mandaue's Sangguniang Panlungsod, a local legislative body. It is composed of 12 elected members as City Councilors. And 2 other members being the President of the Association of Barangay Captains (ABC) and the President of the Sangguniang Kabataan (SK) or Youth Council.

== Current members ==
These are the members after the 2025 local elections:

Position	Name	Party
Presiding Officer	Glenn O. Bercede	1-Cebu
City; Councilors	Joel M. Seno	Lakas
City; Councilors	Fritz B. Villamor	Lakas
City; Councilors	Eugene C. Andaya	Lakas
City; Councilors	Benjamin H. Basiga	Lakas
City; Councilors	Jimmy C. Lumapas	1-Cebu
City; Councilors	Carlo Pontico C. Fortuna	Liberal
City; Councilors	Marie Immaline C. Cortes-Zafra	1-Cebu
City; Councilors	Jesus P. "Jun" Arcilla	1-Cebu
City; Councilors	Tingsol Cabahug	Lakas
City; Councilors	Jennifer S. Del Mar	1-Cebu
City; Councilors	Anjong Icalina Ouano	Lakas
City; Councilors	Editha F. Cabahug	1-Cebu
LNB President	Dante A. Borbajo	Nonpartisan
SK Federation President	Fleuritz Gayle T. Jumao-as	Nonpartisan

== Past members ==
2019-20222016-2019 Membership
Position	Name	Party
Presiding Officer	Glenn O. Bercede	PDP–Laban
City; Councilors	Nerissa Corazon O. Soon-Ruiz	PDP–Laban
City; Councilors	Malcolm A. Sanchez	PDP–Laban
City; Councilors	Jimmy C. Lumapas	PDP–Laban
City; Councilors	Cynthia C. Remedio	PDP–Laban
City; Councilors	Marie Immaline C. Cortes-Zafra	PDP–Laban
City; Councilors	Cesar Y. Cabahug, Jr.	PDP–Laban
City; Councilors	Carmelino C. del Mar, Jr.	PDP–Laban
City; Councilors	Jesus P. Arcilla, Jr.	PDP–Laban
City; Councilors	Joel M. Seno	PDP–Laban
City; Councilors	Andreo O. Icalina	PDP–Laban
LNB President	Ernie N. Manatad	Nonpartisan
SK Federation President	Dallie Mae T. Cabatingan	Nonpartisan
Position	Name	Party
Presiding Officer	Carlo Pontico C. Fortuna	
City; Councilors	Demetrio C. Cortes, Jr.	
City; Councilors	Elmer V. Cabahug	
City; Councilors	Nenita C. Layese	
City; Councilors	Elstone C. Dabon	
City; Councilors	Malcolm A. Sanchez	
City; Councilors	Carmelino C. del Mar, Jr.	
City; Councilors	Benjamin H. Basiga	
City; Councilors	Raul F. Cabahug, V	
City; Councilors	Cynthia C. Remedio	
City; Councilors	Nilo V. Seno	

2010-2013 Membership
Name	Title	Party
Glenn Ouano Bercede	VICE-MAYOR and The PRESIDING OFFICER	Liberal
Diosdado Perez Suico	MAJORITY FLOOR LEADER	Liberal
Editha Flores Cabahug	SP MEMBER	Liberal
Jimmy Cortes Lumapas	SP MEMBER	Liberal
Elston Dabon	SP MEMBER	Liberal
Jose Jefferson Codoy Ceniza	SP MEMBER	Liberal
Ernie Mantad	SP MEMBER	Liberal
Demetrio Cabungcal Cortes Jr.	PRESIDENT PRO TEMPORE	Liberal
Emmarie Ouano-Dizon	SP MEMBER	Liberal
Beethoven Ceniza Andaya	ASSISTANT MAJORITY FLOOR LEADER	Liberal
Nenita Cortes Layese	SP MEMBER	Liberal
Benjamin H Basiga	SP MEMBER	Liberal
Jeric Mikail Cuizon	SP MEMBER	Liberal
