= Mayor of Mandaue =

Local chief executive of Mandaue, Philippines

- Alkalde sa Dakbayan sa Mandaue
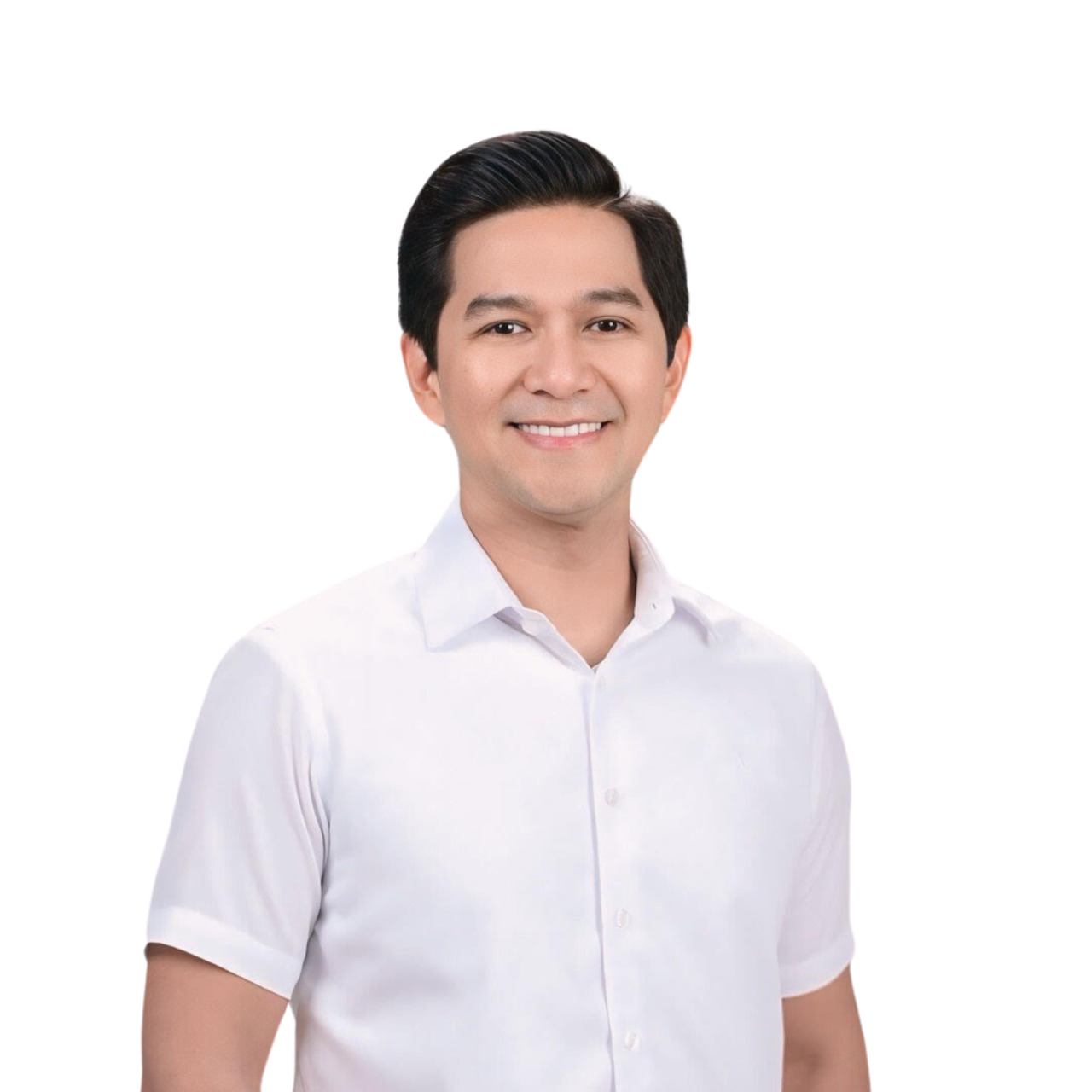
- Incumbent; Thadeo Jovito “Jonkie” M. Ouano since June 30, 2025
- Style: The Honorable
- Seat: Mandaue Presidencia
- Appointer: Elected via popular vote
- Term length: 3 years, not eligible for re-election immediately after three consecutive terms
- Inaugural holder: Ariston Cortes
- Formation: 1943
- Succession: Vice Mayor then Highest ranking Sangguniang Panlungsod member
- Deputy: Vice Mayor

The Mayor of Mandaue (Cebuano: Alkalde sa Mandaue, Filipino: Alkalde ng Mandaue) is the head of the Local government of Mandaue. Since the Pre-Hispanic time were chiefs, only two are known Aponoan and Lambuzzan. Not many people are mentioned in the Spanish Expedition chronicles; the former was succeeded by the latter. During the year 1600 when the Spanish subjugated Mandaue Andug was the chief of the settlement. Before there were priests, Capitanes, Tenientes and the Cabeza de Barangay were the local leaders in Spanish regime. Later, in the American commonwealth era of the Philippines the leaders were the President and after the war the title changed to Mayor. Mandaue was only incorporated as a city on June 21, 1969 in the term of Mayor Demetrio Cortes Sr. which led to the signing of the City Charter on August 30, 1969 under Republic Act No 5519.

Mandaue's Administration in the Prehispanic time were Chiefs only two are known Aponoan and Lambusan who existed in the Spanish Expedition. Before Priests, Capitanes, Tenientes and the Cabeza de Barangay were the local leaders in Spanish regime then in the American commonwealth era of the Philippines the leaders were the El Presidentes of Mandaue and after the war the changed the title to Mayor in 1943.

== Presidente ==
Name	Position	Legacy	Years served
Leoncio Jayme	1st Municipal President		1899
Elias Espina	2nd Municipal President	The Attack of the American Troops	1900–1901
Benito Ceniza	3rd Municipal President	Executed by Americans	1901
Fabiano Suyco	4th Municipal President		1902–1903
Benigno Suyco	5th Municipal President		1904–1907
Luis Espina	6th Municipal President		1908–1909
Benigno Suyco	7th Municipal President		1910–1911
Segunda Jayme	8th Municipal President		1912–1919
Alejandro del Rosal	9th Municipal President	Separation of Consolacion	1919–1925
Ariston Cortes Sr.	10th Municipal President		1925–1934
Alejandro del Rosal	11th Municipal President	Construction of Mandaue Presidencia and Mandaue City Central School	1934–1940
Alejandro Fortuna	12th Municipal President	Killed by Japanese for treason	1941–1943

Alejandro Fortuna was the final leader under the title El Presidente of Mandaue. He was succeeded by Ariston Cortes under the title of Mayor of the Town of Mandaue. He was beheaded due to treason, dated March 26, 1945 at the age of 41 years.

== Mayor ==
No.	Image	Mayor	Term of office	
Municipality of Mandaue (1943–1969)
1		Ariston Cortes ^{1}	1943	
2		Santiago Suyco ^{1}	1943	
3		Alejandro Fortuna ^{1}	1943	1945
4		Martin Echivarre	1945	1946
5		Eustaquio Rosal	1946	
6		Eriberto Dimpas	1947	
7		Apolinar Cortes	1947	
8		Pedro Basubas	1947	
9		Fabiano Pesons	1948	1951
10		Urbano Seno	1952	1955
11		Apolonio Gonzaga	1956	1959
12		Conrado Seno	1960	1963
13		Demetrio Cortes Sr.	1964	1969
City of Mandaue (1969–present)
(13)		Demetrio Cortes Sr.	1969	1986
14		Vicente dela Serna ^{1}	1986	
15		Restituto Soon ^{1}	1987	
16		Alfredo Ouano	1988	1998
17		Thadeo Ouano	1998	2007
18		Amadeo Seno ^{1}	2007	
(17)		Thadeo Ouano	2007	2007
19		Jonas Cortes	2007	2016
20		Luigi Quisumbing	2016	2019
(19)		Jonas Cortes	2019	Suspended: since August 13, 2024; dismissed on October 3, 2024
21		Glenn O. Bercede	2024	October 3, 2024 - June 30, 2025
22		Thadeo Jovito “Jonkie” M. Ouano	2025	Incumbent (Since June 30, 2025)

Note
^{1} Officer-in-charge.
