= Luigi Quisumbing =

Filipino politician

The Honorable Luigi Quisumbing
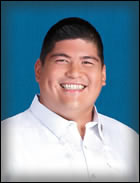
- Official portrait, 2013

Mayor of Mandaue
- In office June 30, 2016 – June 30, 2019
- Vice Mayor: Carlo Fortuna
- Preceded by: Jonas Cortes
- Succeeded by: Jonas Cortes

Member of the House of Representatives from Cebu's 6th district
- In office June 30, 2010 – June 30, 2016
- Preceded by: Nerissa Corazon Soon-Ruiz
- Succeeded by: Jonas Cortes

Member of the Cebu Provincial Board from the 6th district
- In office June 30, 2004 – June 30, 2007

Personal details
- Born: Gabriel Luis Romualdez Quisumbing; July 12, 1979 (age 47) Cebu, Philippines
- Party: NPC (2016–present)
- Other political affiliations: Liberal (2012–2016); 1CEBU (2009–2012); Lakas (2007–2012); Alayon (2004–2007)
- Spouse: Maricar Hofileña (m. 2015)
- Relations: Romualdez family
- Education: University of San Carlos
- Occupation: Politician

Gabriel Luis "Luigi" Romualdez Quisumbing (born July 12, 1979) is a Filipino politician, who served as Mayor of Mandaue from 2016 to 2019 and was the representative of the 6th district of Cebu from 2010 to 2016.

== Political career ==
=== Board Member and Congressman ===
Quisumbing entered politics in 2004 as a Provincial Board Member in the province of Cebu representing the 6th District. He later became the House Representative for the same district in 2010. He served his second term in 2013 after being re-elected to the same Congressional position. Quisumbing is a former member of One Cebu Party and was later sworn in as a member of the ruling Liberal Party in 2012. In 2012, Quisumbing outlined his plans and goals for the 6th District of Cebu during a newspaper interview.

=== Mayor of Mandaue ===
Quisumbing was the Liberal Party candidate for the mayoralty position of Mandaue City in the 2016 election, alongside Atty. Carlo Fortuna as his Vice Mayor. Rep. Quisumbing endorsed incumbent Mandaue City Mayor Jonas Cortes to run as House Representative for the 6th district of Cebu. On October 12, 2015, Quisumbing, Fortuna, Cortes and their whole slate took their oaths as the representatives of the Liberal Party in Mandaue and the 6th District, respectively.

Elected as Mayor of Mandaue in 2016, Quisumbing committed himself to the platform of governance he announced during the campaign period of 2016. Quisumbing has formed his transition team that will identify the people to fill-up key positions in the City Hall for the next three years under his leadership.

Quisumbing lost his re-election bid to Jonas Cortes in 2019.

== Personal life ==
Quisumbing is a relative of the Lopez-Romualdez family. He is the grandson of Norberto B. Quisumbing Jr., the founder of Norkis Trading Company and Norkis Group of Companies.

Quisumbing married Maricar Hofileña on March 7, 2015, at the St. Joseph Parish in Mandaue City.
