= Barili =

Municipality in Cebu, Philippines

- Municipality
- Municipality of Barili
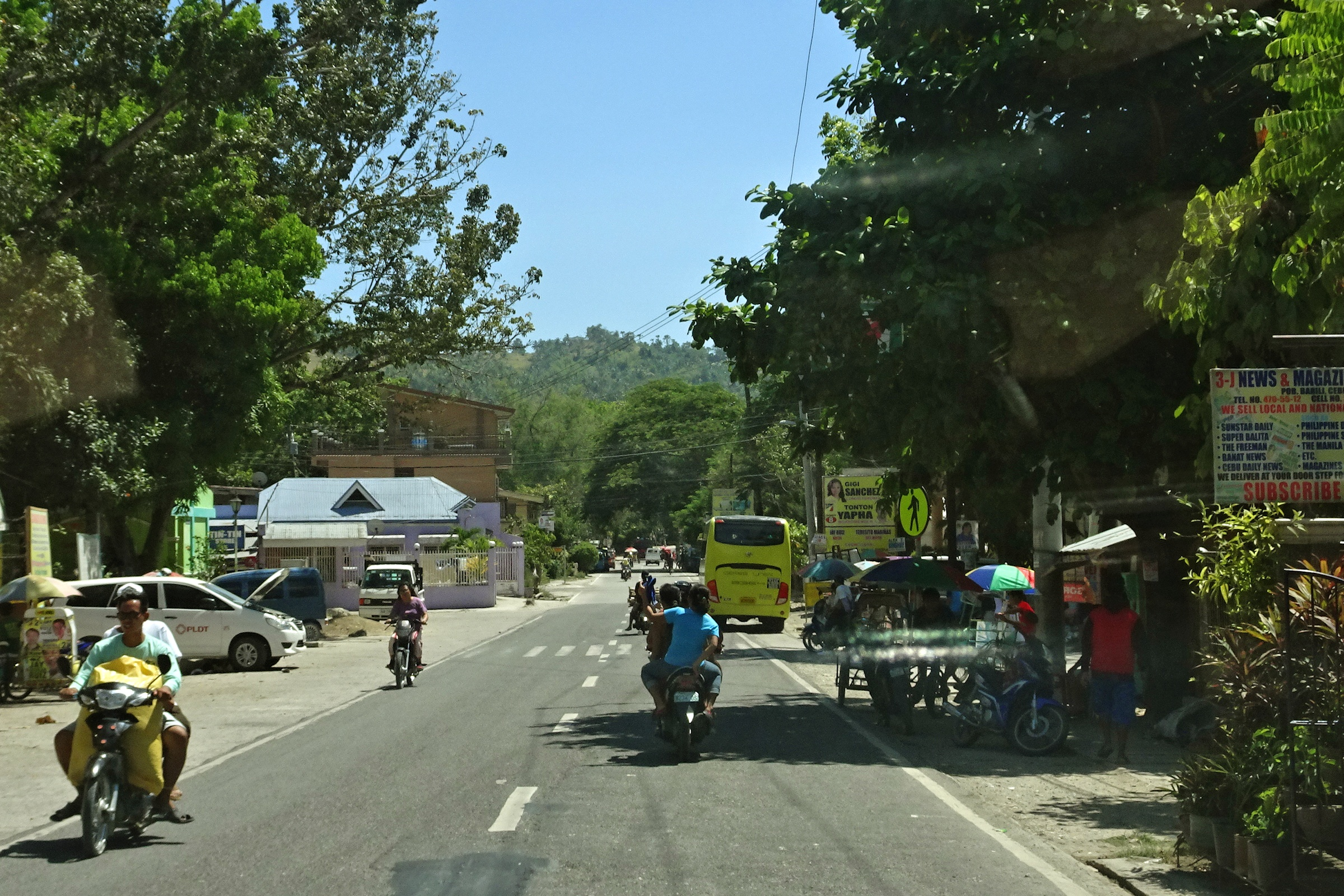
- Poblacion area

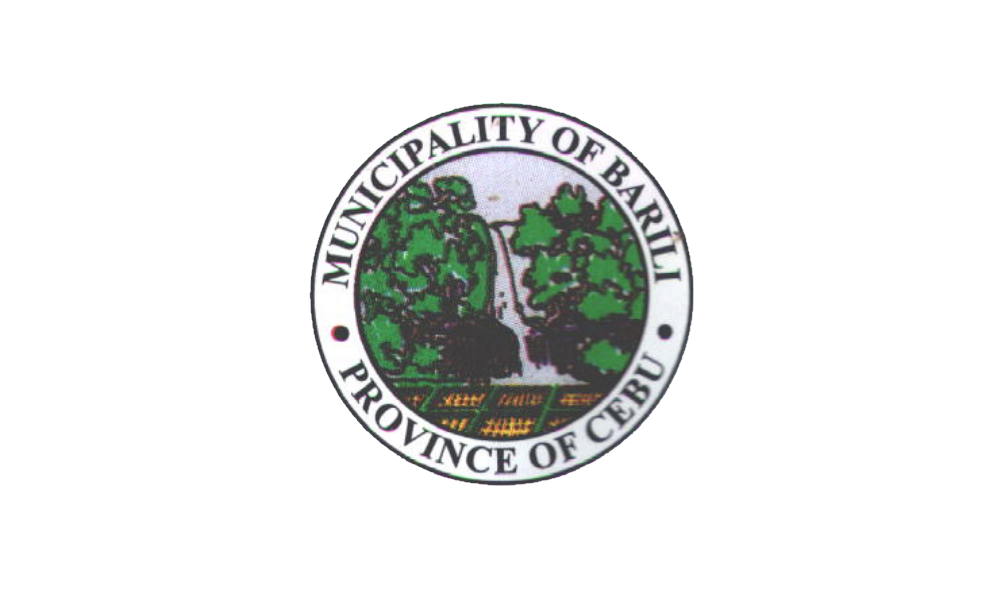
- Flag
- Anthem: Barili hymn
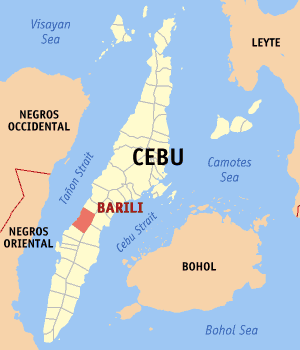
- Map of Cebu with Barili highlighted
- Interactive map of Barili
- Location within the Philippines
- Coordinates: 10°07′N 123°32′E
- Country: Philippines
- Region: Central Visayas
- Province: Cebu
- District: 3rd district
- Founded: 1632
- Barangays: 42 (see Barangays)

Government
  - Type: Sangguniang Bayan
  - Mayor: Pablo John D. Garcia IV (1Cebu)
  - Vice Mayor: Luisito L. Ponsica (1Cebu)
  - Representative: Pablo John F. Garcia
  - Municipal Council: Members: Jayra Angelic Ruiz-Javier; John Joshua L. Ricardel; Teresito P. Mariñas; Nelson G. Gingoyon; Robert Arthur P. Alquizola; John Anthony T. Añober; Shelomith Ann C. Ewican; Andres C. Alpas
  - Electorate: 58,511 voters (2025)

Area
  - Total: 122.21 km^{2} (47.19 sq mi)
- Elevation: 92 m (302 ft)
- Highest elevation: 548 m (1,798 ft)
- Lowest elevation: 0 m (0 ft)

Population (2024 census)
  - Total: 82,427
  - Density: 674.47/km^{2} (1,746.9/sq mi)
  - Households: 18,638

Economy
  - Income class: 1st municipal income class
  - Poverty incidence: 27.07% (2023)
  - Revenue: ₱ 393.7 million (2024)
  - Assets: ₱ 618.2 million (2024)
  - Expenditure: ₱ 273.8 million (2024)
  - Liabilities: ₱ 301.4 million (2024)

Service provider
  - Electricity: Cebu 1 Electric Cooperative (CEBECO 1)
- Time zone: UTC+8 (PST)
- ZIP code: 6036
- PSGC: 072210000
- IDD : area code: +63 (0)32
- Native languages: Cebuano; Tagalog

Barili, officially the Municipality of Barili (Cebuano: Lungsod sa Barili; Tagalog: Bayan ng Barili), is a municipality in the province of Cebu, Philippines. According to the 2024 census, it has a population of 82,427 people.

== History ==
The word barili comes from the name of a local grass called balili. The municipality was founded in 1632, though the parish of Barili was established in 1614. A cross was erected by conquistadores on their arrival at 1602, and still exists today. The 1818 census showed the tributes representing 1,943 native families and 14 Spanish-Filipino families.

It was in Barili that the Japanese forces captured Chief Justice José Abad Santos while on his way to Toledo as his escape route to Negros.

In 2006, the town became the first municipality in Cebu province to give protections to its heritage sites through Municipal Ordinance No. 04-06-01, s. 2006, declaring certain shrines, houses, buildings, monuments, markers and other areas as cultural properties of the municipality.

== Geography ==
The town is situated on the Balili river, about two miles from its mouth.

Barili is bordered to the north by the town of Aloguinsan, to the west is the Tañon Strait, to the east is the city of Carcar and the town of Sibonga, and to the south is the town of Dumanjug. It is 116 kilometres (72 mi) from Cebu City.

=== Barangays ===
Barili is politically subdivided into 42 barangays. Each barangay consists of puroks and some have sitios.

PSGC	Barangay	Population			±% p.a.	
		2024		2010		
072210001	Azucena	2.5%	2,061	1,647	▴	1.57%
072210002	Bagakay	1.1%	904	824	▴	0.65%
072210003	Balao	3.0%	2,446	1,776	▴	2.25%
072210004	Bolocboloc	2.7%	2,226	1,932	▴	0.99%
072210005	Budbud	2.0%	1,628	1,513	▴	0.51%
072210006	Bugtong Kawayan	1.0%	800	719	▴	0.75%
072210007	Cabcaban	2.3%	1,922	1,543	▴	1.54%
072210016	Cagay	2.2%	1,813	1,568	▴	1.01%
072210008	Campangga	1.8%	1,455	1,481	▾	−0.12%
072210020	Candugay	2.2%	1,777	1,443	▴	1.46%
072210009	Dakit	2.3%	1,864	1,672	▴	0.76%
072210010	Giloctog	1.9%	1,589	1,502	▴	0.39%
072210012	Giwanon	2.2%	1,830	1,608	▴	0.90%
072210011	Guibuangan	2.8%	2,303	2,212	▴	0.28%
072210013	Gunting	3.5%	2,861	2,566	▴	0.76%
072210014	Hilasgasan	0.9%	747	863	▾	−1.00%
072210015	Japitan	4.6%	3,821	3,527	▴	0.56%
072210017	Kalubihan	1.7%	1,403	1,197	▴	1.11%
072210018	Kangdampas	1.3%	1,077	955	▴	0.84%
072210021	Luhod	1.2%	955	917	▴	0.28%
072210022	Lupo	0.8%	673	614	▴	0.64%
072210023	Luyo	1.3%	1,091	1,071	▴	0.13%
072210024	Maghanoy	1.5%	1,265	1,077	▴	1.13%
072210025	Maigang	2.4%	1,978	1,688	▴	1.11%
072210026	Malolos	2.1%	1,742	1,617	▴	0.52%
072210027	Mantalongon	3.6%	2,988	2,566	▴	1.06%
072210028	Mantayupan	2.8%	2,317	2,092	▴	0.71%
072210029	Mayana	1.5%	1,250	1,075	▴	1.05%
072210030	Minolos	2.9%	2,399	2,311	▴	0.26%
072210031	Nabunturan	0.9%	774	684	▴	0.86%
072210032	Nasipit	1.4%	1,172	1,030	▴	0.90%
072210034	Pancil	1.4%	1,153	890	▴	1.82%
072210035	Pangpang	1.2%	995	853	▴	1.08%
072210036	Paril	1.5%	1,241	1,137	▴	0.61%
072210037	Patupat	2.2%	1,850	1,663	▴	0.74%
072210038	Poblacion	6.2%	5,141	4,808	▴	0.47%
072210039	San Rafael	2.0%	1,654	1,157	▴	2.52%
072210040	Santa Ana	2.5%	2,087	2,045	▴	0.14%
072210041	Sayaw	1.6%	1,298	1,090	▴	1.22%
072210042	Tal‑ot	2.3%	1,876	1,639	▴	0.94%
072210043	Tubod	2.6%	2,176	1,889	▴	0.99%
072210044	Vito	1.5%	1,260	1,063	▴	1.19%
	Total		82,427	65,524	▴	1.61%

=== Climate ===
Climate data for Barili, Cebu
Month	Jan	Feb	Mar	Apr	May	Jun	Jul	Aug	Sep	Oct	Nov	Dec	Year
Mean daily maximum °C (°F)	29 (84)	30 (86)	31 (88)	32 (90)	31 (88)	30 (86)	30 (86)	30 (86)	30 (86)	29 (84)	29 (84)	29 (84)	30 (86)
Mean daily minimum °C (°F)	22 (72)	22 (72)	23 (73)	24 (75)	25 (77)	25 (77)	24 (75)	24 (75)	24 (75)	24 (75)	24 (75)	23 (73)	24 (75)
Average precipitation mm (inches)	42 (1.7)	34 (1.3)	40 (1.6)	61 (2.4)	124 (4.9)	188 (7.4)	190 (7.5)	191 (7.5)	189 (7.4)	186 (7.3)	124 (4.9)	73 (2.9)	1,442 (56.8)
Average rainy days	10.0	8.5	9.5	12.8	22.3	26.8	28.4	27.9	27.3	27.6	20.5	13.1	234.7
Source: Meteoblue (modeled/calculated data, not measured locally)

== Demographics ==
Population census of Barili

Year	Pop.	±% p.a.
1903	31,617	—
1918	33,481	+0.38%
1939	29,247	−0.64%
1948	27,267	−0.78%
1960	28,656	+0.41%
1970	34,714	+1.93%

Year	Pop.	±% p.a.
1975	36,286	+0.89%
1980	39,560	+1.74%
1990	47,789	+1.91%
1995	52,060	+1.62%
2000	57,764	+2.25%
2007	60,430	+0.62%

Year	Pop.	±% p.a.
2010	65,524	+2.99%
2015	73,862	+2.31%
2020	80,715	+1.89%
2024	82,427	+0.51%

Source: Philippine Statistics Authority

== Economy ==
Poverty incidence of Barili (%)

Source: Philippine Statistics Authority

Barili is an agricultural town, and its economic output is more on food security. Farming and animal husbandry are the main livelihood of people residing in the town. They focus on rice and corn farming, animal husbandry such as hog, cattle and poultry, fruit farming and even vegetable gardening. Barili has its established Mantalongon Livestock Market where you can buy live animals which collectively come from Southern parts of Cebu and even from Negros Province. Barili is also known for its Japitan Fish Port. located in Barangay Japitan, 4–5 km away from its public market. Barangay Guiwanon of the same town is known for production of hand-weaved 'native hats made from leaves of the buri tree and other weaved native products.

== Tourism ==
Mantayupan Falls are located close to the eastern end of the Carcar—Barili Road where it connects to the national highway. The falls are approximately 61 metres (200 ft) high but do not have a direct descent. Pools at various heights flow into the basin. The waterfall is one of three main tourist attractions in the interior barangays of Barili.

== Education ==
The public schools in the town of Barili are administered by two school districts under the Schools Division of Cebu Province.

Elementary schools:

- Balao Elementary School — Balao
- Barili I Central Elementary School — M. Zosa Street, Poblacion
- Bolocboloc Elementary School — Bolocboloc
- Budbud Elementary School — Budbud
- Bugtong Kawayan Elementary School — Bugtong Kawayan
- Cabcaban Elementary School — Cabcaban
- Cenon & Ciriaca Marinas Memorial Elementary School — Kangdampas
- Dakit Elementary School — Dakit
- Dita Primary School — Sitio Dita, Luyo
- Federico & Solidad Villaflor Elementary School — Luhod
- Giloctog Elementary School — Giloctog
- Guibuangan Central Elementary School — Guibuangan
- Gunting Elementary School — Gunting
- Hilasgasan Elementary School — Hilasgasan
- Japitan Elementary School — Japitan
- Kandugay Elementary School — Candugay
- Lamak Elementary School — Sitio Lamak, Mayana
- Loyo Elementary School — Luyo
- Maghanoy Elementary School — Maghanoy
- Maigang Elementary School — Maigang
- Malolos Elementary School — Malolos
- Mantalongon Elementary School — Mantalongon
- Mantayupan Elementary School — Mantayupan
- M.H. Paras Memorial Elementary School — Campangga
- Minolos Elementary School — Minolos
- Pancil Elementary School — Pancil
- Pangpang Elementary School — Pangpang
- Paril Elementary School — Paril
- Patupat Elementary School — Azucena
- Primo Villegas Elementary School — Cagay
- Sayaw Elementary School — Sayaw
- Tal-ot Elementary School — Tal-ot
- Tubod Elementary School — Tubod
- Vito Elementary School — Vito

High schools:

- Balao National High School — Balao
- Bartolome & Manuela Pañares Memorial National High School — F. Paras Street, Poblacion
- Cagay National High School — Cagay
- Federico & Soledad Villaflor Memorial National High School — Luhod
- Giloctog National High School — Giloctog
- Guibuangan National High School — Guibuangan
- Lamak National High School — Sitio Lamak, Mayana
- Malolos National High School — Malolos
- Mantalongon National High School — Mantalongon
- Patupat National High School — Azucena
- Teotimo A. Abellana Sr. Memorial National High School — Bolocboloc

== Gallery ==
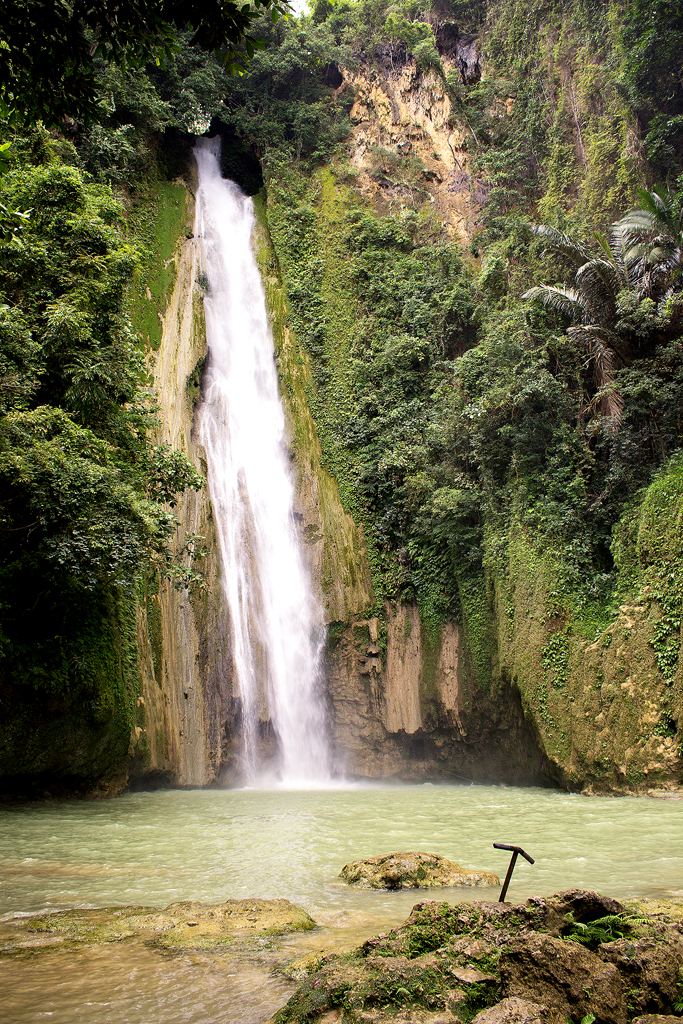
Mantayupan Falls

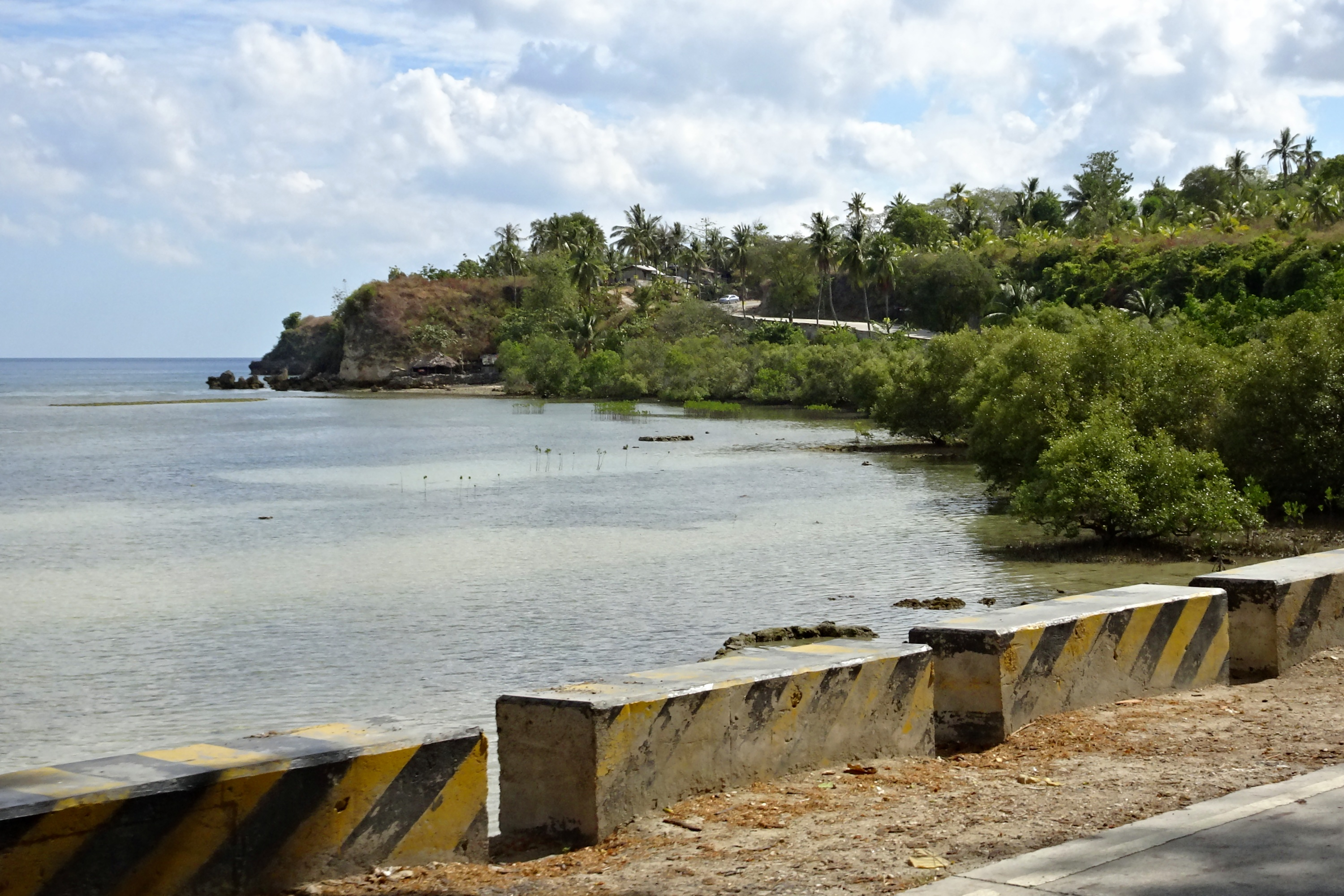
Tañon Strait coast at Barili

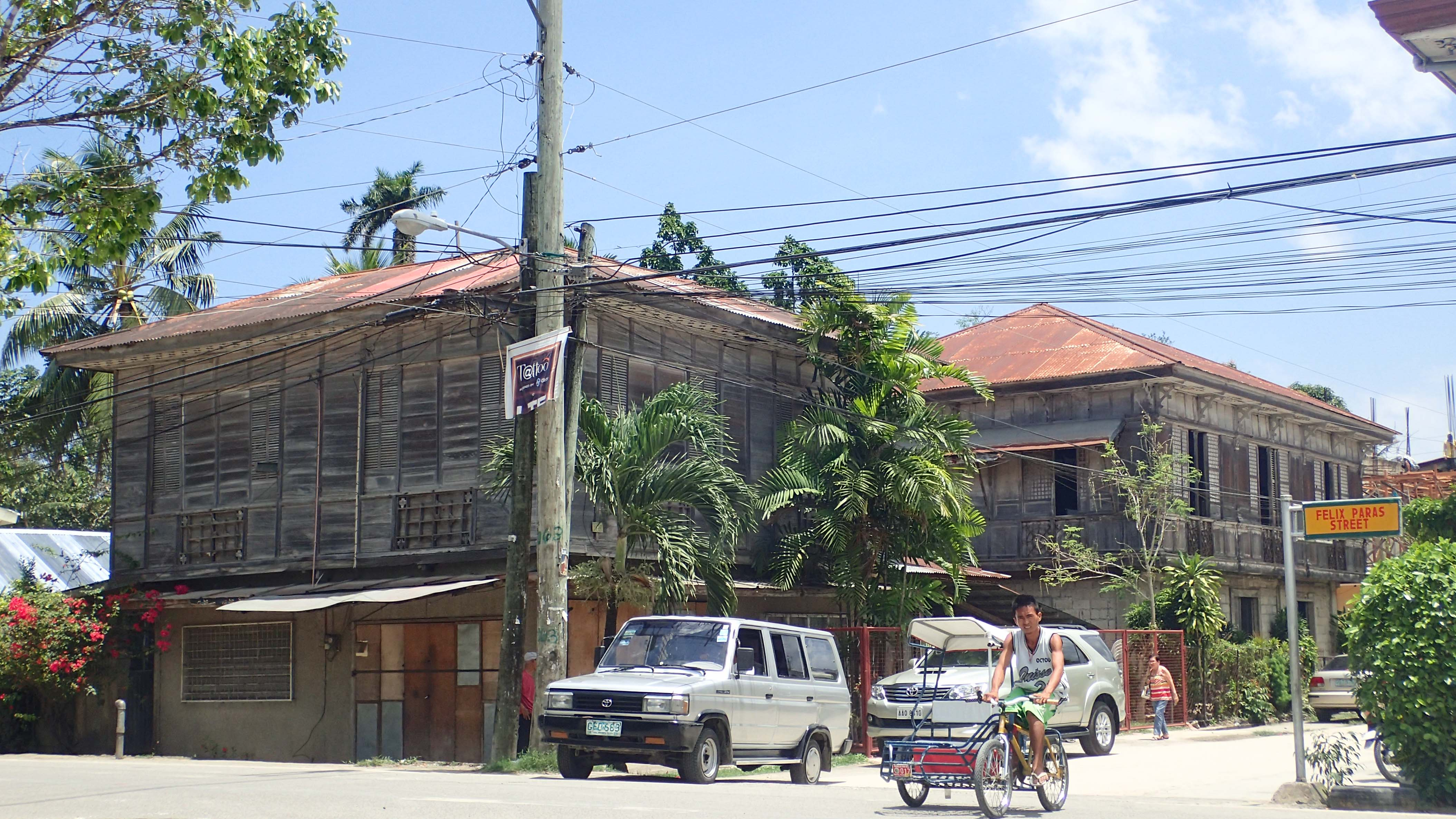
Historic houses in Barili

== See also ==
- List of Cultural Properties of the Philippines in Barili, Cebu

== Sources ==
- Cabigas, Estan (29 September 2011), "Visiting Mantayupan Falls after 23 years" (Photographic essay), Langyaw, archived from the original on 1 October 2011
- Pace, Azucena (2009). Barili The Town The People The Years, A History. Cebu: Local Government Unit of Barili, Cebu. ISBN 978-9719441601.
