= Jonas Cortes =

Filipino politician

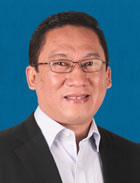

19th Mayor of Mandaue
- In office June 30, 2019 – October 3, 2024
- Preceded by: Luigi Quisumbing
- Succeeded by: Glenn Bercede
- In office June 30, 2007 – June 30, 2016
- Preceded by: Amadeo Seno
- Succeeded by: Luigi Quisumbing

Member of the Philippine House of Representatives from Cebu's 6th district
- In office June 30, 2016 – June 30, 2019
- Preceded by: Luigi Quisumbing
- Succeeded by: Emmarie Ouano-Dizon

Personal details
- Born: July 20, 1966 (age 60) Mandaue, Cebu, Philippines
- Party: 1CEBU (2024–present); PDP–Laban (2016–2024; 2026–present)
- Other political affiliations: Lakas–NUCD (2001–2006); PDSP (2006–2009); Liberal (2010–2016); Independent (2009–2010; 2024–2026)
- Education: Visayas State University

Jonas Cabungcal Cortes (born July 20, 1966) is a Filipino politician who served as the Mayor of Mandaue (2019-2025), a position he previously held from 2007 to 2016. He previously served as representative of the sixth district of Cebu from 2016 to 2019.

== Personal life ==
Cortes is the thirteenth child of the former Mandaue mayor Demetrio Cortes Sr. and Celestina Alimpangog Cabungcal. He is of Filipino, Spanish and Chinese ancestry. He was born and raised in Centro, Mandaue. Cortes attended St. Joseph's Academy for grade school and in St. Louis School of Mandaue for high school. He then graduated from Visayas State College of Agriculture in 1987 with a Bachelor of Science degree in animal husbandry. He married Sarah Lea Walker, a Filipino-American on August 14, 1999, with whom he has two children, Dmitri and Mikyla.

== Political career ==
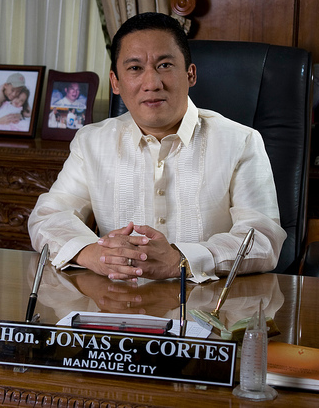
Jonas Cortes as the Mayor of Mandaue City from 2007 to 2016 and again from 2019 to 2025.

Cortes filed his COC as an independent and ran against former Mandaue Mayor Thadeo Ouano's son Jonkie Ouano, Cortes was elected mayor.

Cortes won a second term as mayor in 2010 when he received 59.54% of the votes, and also carried his party to win a majority of the seats on the city council after he defeated in a landslide victory former 6th district representative Nerissa Soon Ruiz and her slate.

In 2019, Cortes entered into an alliance with Lolypop Ouano-Dizon as Mayoral and Congressional Candidates respectively. Cortes with the support of Thadeo Ouano's descendants formed the Cortes-Ouano alliance supported by PDP-Laban and the regional party One Cebu.

During the 2019 election, Jonas Cortes was re-elected as mayor of Mandaue, with landslide victory in all the City Council seats against Luigi Quisumbing's Hugpong Mandaue.

In 2025, Cortes lost reelection for mayor to Thadeo Ouano.

== Controversies ==
During the 2019 elections, then mayor Luigi Quisumbing filed plunder and graft cases against Cortes and several former city officials over a sale in 2015 to EC Ouano Development and Management Corp. (Ecodemcor), for a 35,821-square-meter property, which was sold at a recorded price of P50 per sq/m, which turned out to be just part of the purchase price as there was also a donation of several properties in consideration of the said sale.

On April 11, 2024, a private citizen from Cebu City filed a complaint with the Ombudsman against Cortes, Jamaal James Calipayan, city administrator, and Buddy Alain Ybañez, head of the City Risk Reduction Management Office, for the cutting of mangrove trees in Barangay Paknaan. The case was dismissed in August 2024, citing an overlap with an ongoing civil case.

In August 2024, the Ombudsman issued a one-year preventive suspension without pay on Cortes based on grave misconduct, for his alleged unlawful designation of Camilo Basaca as head of the city's social welfare department. In October 2024, the Ombudsman ordered dismissing suspended Cortes's dismissal for grave misconduct in connection with the illegal operation of a cement batching plant. Despite the decision, Cortes filed his candidacy to run again for mayor in the 2025 Philippine general election on October 4. On October 22, the Supreme Court issued a temporary restraining order against the Commission on Elections's Resolution which disqualified Cortes from running in the election. In November, the Ombudsman-Visayas upheld its dismissal of Maria Priscilla S. Melendres' complaints against Cortes and other city officials.
