= Pablo John Garcia =

Filipino politician

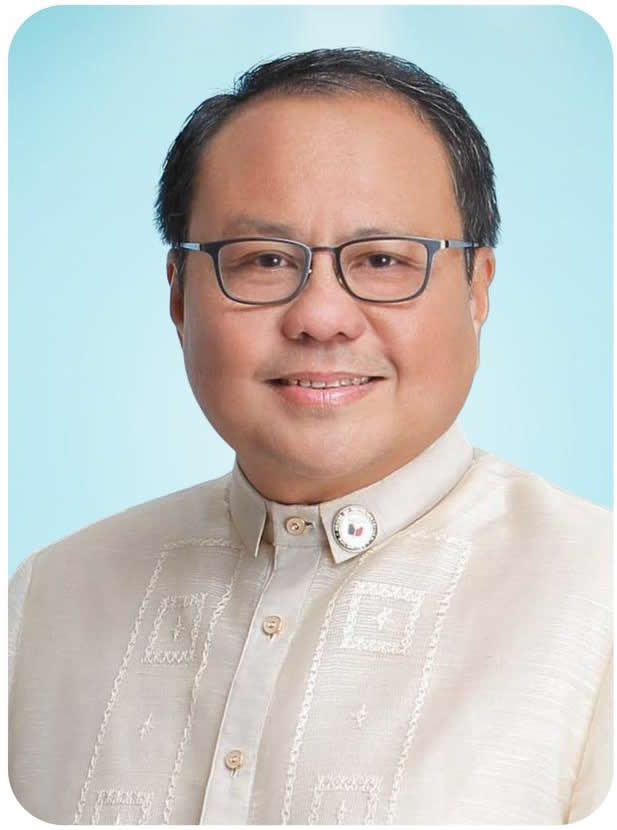
- Official portrait, 2022

Deputy Speaker of the House of Representatives of the Philippines
- In office July 29, 2019 – June 1, 2022
- House Speaker: Alan Peter Cayetano; Lord Allan Velasco

Member of the Philippine House of Representatives from Cebu's 3rd district
- In office June 30, 2019 – June 30, 2025
- Preceded by: Gwendolyn Garcia
- Succeeded by: Karen Flores-Garcia
- In office June 30, 2007 – June 30, 2013
- Preceded by: Antonio Yapha Jr.
- Succeeded by: Gwendolyn Garcia

Personal details
- Born: May 19, 1967 (age 59) Cebu City, Philippines
- Party: NUP (2011–2018; 2021–present); 1CEBU (2007–present)
- Other political affiliations: PDP–Laban (2018–2021); Lakas (2007–2011); KAMPI (2006–2007)
- Spouse: Karen Flores-Garcia
- Children: 4
- Relatives: Garcia family, including siblings Gwen and Winston
- Education: Ateneo de Manila University (BA); University of the Philippines Diliman (LL.B)
- Profession: Lawyer

Pablo John "PJ" Fiel Garcia (born May 19, 1967) is a Filipino lawyer and politician. He is a member of the National Unity Party and the One Cebu party.

== Early life and family ==
Pablo John is the youngest child of former Governor, Congressman and Deputy Speaker Pablo P. Garcia and the late Judge Esperanza “Inday” Fiel-Garcia, who bore eight children.

The eldest, Gwendolyn Garcia, is the incumbent Governor of the Province of Cebu, who also served as Congresswoman of the Third District from 2013 to 2019, after having served three terms as Governor of Cebu, from 2004 to 2013. His brother, Winston Garcia, is the former manager of the Government Service Insurance System (Philippines) and the official candidate of One Cebu for Governor on May 9, 2016. Another brother, Byron, is a former security consultant for the Cebu provincial government, and caught global attention in 2007 after directing inmates of the Cebu Provincial Detention and Rehabilitation Center (CPDRC) in the viral video of inmates dancing to the music of, "Thriller". Another brother, Marlon, is the incumbent Mayor of their hometown, Barili.

Garcia's father, Pablo, served three terms as governor of Cebu from 1995 to 2004, after having served as Congressman of the Third District of Cebu from 1987 to 1995. He then became Congressman of the Second District of Cebu from 2007 to 2013.

== Education ==
Pablo John finished elementary at the Cebu Sacred Heart School for Boys, and high school, at the University of the Philippines - Cebu High School (UP High), 1984, with gold medal for Journalism. At the Ateneo de Manila University, Pablo John became a Merit Scholar, in the Economics Honors Program, but he shifted to Philosophy, and graduated in 1989. In 1993, he graduated at the University of the Philippines College of Law and placed 4th in the 1993 Philippine Bar Examination with a rating of 86.5125%, as his father Pabling placed third in the 1951 bar exams, USC, 91.5%. While at UP, he was editor-in-chief of The Philippine Collegian from 1992 to 1993.

== Legal career ==
Pablo John, in 1995, worked as managing partner of Garcia Garcia Ong Vaño, the law firm Winston established. He handled the celebrated Batas Pambansa Blg. 22 case, "Lina Lim Lao versus The Court of Appeals, et al.", G.R. No. 119178, 30 June 1997. He then served as strategist, chief legal counsel, and consultant of Gwendolyn Garcia. He writes “Breakfast at Noon,” a Cebu Daily News column and later, at Sun.Star Cebu from 1998 to 2005.

Garcia & Garcia Law Offices is the law offices of Gov. Pablo P. Garcia and sons Winston Garcia and Pablo John Garcia.

== Political career ==
Garcia was elected to the House of Representatives of the Philippines in 2007 and 2010, representing the Third District of Cebu. In 2019, he ran as representative of the Third District of Cebu, winning in a field of three with 52% of the vote. He defeated former Senator John Henry Osmeña and former Pinamungajan Mayor Geraldine Yapha. On July 30, 2019, Pablo John was elected one of the deputy speakers of the 18th Congress under the leadership of Speaker Alan Peter Cayetano.

== Personal life ==
Pablo John is married to Karen Flores-Garcia; they have four children.

== Electoral history ==
Electoral history of Pablo John Garcia
Year	Office	Party		Votes received				Result
Year	Office	Local	National	Total	%	P.	Swing	Result
2007	Representative (Cebu–3rd)	1CEBU	KAMPI	84,409	—N/a	1st	—N/a	Won
2010	Representative (Cebu–3rd)	1CEBU	Lakas–Kampi	127,730	61.61%	1st	—N/a	Won
2019	Representative (Cebu–3rd)	1CEBU	PDP–Laban	128,878	—N/a	1st	—N/a	Won
2022	Representative (Cebu–3rd)	1CEBU	NUP	201,530	100.00%	1st	—N/a	Unopposed

== Notes ==
House of Representatives of the Philippines
Preceded by Antonio Yapha Jr.	Representative, 3rd District of Cebu; 2007–2013	Succeeded by Gwendolyn Garcia
Preceded by Gwendolyn Garcia	Representative, 3rd District of Cebu; 2019–present	Incumbent
