= Crisologo Abines =

Filipino politician

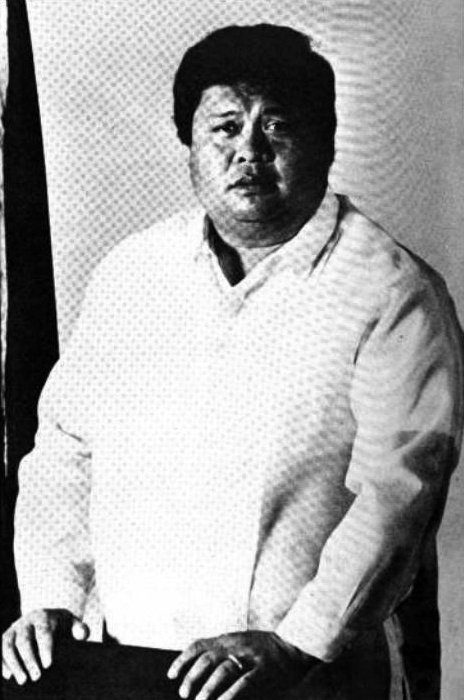
- Abines official portrait during the 8th Congress.

Member of the Philippine House of Representatives from Cebu's 2nd district
- In office June 30, 1987 – June 30, 1998
- Preceded by: District re-created Post last held by John Henry Osmeña
- Succeeded by: Simeon L. Kintanar

Personal details
- Born: Crisologo Andrade Abines; July 8, 1943 Oslob, Cebu, Philippine Commonwealth
- Died: January 28, 2008 (aged 64)
- Party: UNO (2007–2008)
- Other party: Lakas (1995–2007); LDP (1992–1995); LnB (1987–1992)

Crisologo Andrade Abines (July 8, 1943 – January 28, 2008) was a Filipino politician. He was former First Lieutenant in the Philippine Army assigned in the Logistics Service, Visayas Command. A Filipino public servant who was the youngest municipal mayor during his generation serving the Cebu Province.

== Early life ==
Abines grew up in a politically active family. His father was a councilor and eventually the mayor of Oslob.

== Political career ==
In the 1971 Philippine elections, Abines ran as the mayor of Santander, Cebu. During his term, the Liloan-Looc Waterworks Association was established, and the Santander Municipal Wharf was created. He and his family were allies with Then-President Ferdinand Marcos. He was elected to three consecutive terms in the House of Representatives, representing the 2nd District of Cebu from 1987 to 1998. He served in the Eighth, Ninth and Tenth Congresses.

== Homicide case ==
Abines was tried along with three others for the 1999 homicide case of his assailant inside a cockpit in Santander, Cebu. He was eventually acquitted by the Sandiganbayan, upon presentation of evidence that he was instead the victim and was first fired upon.

== 2007 elections and death ==
During the 2007 elections, Abines served as the provincial chairman of the United Opposition for Cebu. Abines planned to return to his original post in the 1990s. He ran for the second district of Cebu, eventually losing to Incumbent Pablo P. Garcia. He died of a myocardial infarction in January of the following year when he was 60.

== Notes ==
House of Representatives of the Philippines
Preceded by John Henry Osmeña	Representative, 2nd District of Cebu; 1987–1998	Succeeded by Simeon Kintanar
