= 2010 Philippine House of Representatives elections in Central Visayas =

Philippine House of Representatives elections in Central Visayas, 2010
- May 10, 2010

15 seats of Central Visayas in the House of Representatives
	First party	Second party	Third party
Party	Lakas–Kampi	Liberal	NPC
Seats won	8	3	2
Popular vote	972,466	781,572	399,937
Percentage	35.18%	28.27%	14.47%
	Fourth party	Fifth party
Party	Nacionalista	LDP
Seats won	1	1
Popular vote	209,208	92,220
Percentage	7.57%	3.34%
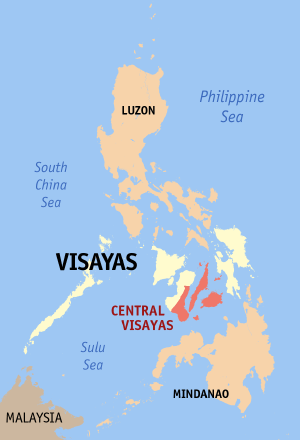
- Location of Central Visayas within the country.

Elections were held in Central Visayas for seats in the House of Representatives of the Philippines on May 10, 2010.

The candidate with the most votes won that district's seat for the 15th Congress of the Philippines.

== Summary ==
Party	Popular vote	%	Seats won
Lakas–Kampi	972,466	35.18%	8
Liberal	781,572	28.27%	3
NPC	399,937	14.47%	2
Nacionalista	209,208	7.57%	1
Kugi Uswag Sugbu	126,144	4.56%	0
LDP	92,220	3.34%	1
PMP	29,374	1.06%	0
PDSP	10,094	0.37%	0
PGRP	5,555	0.20%	0
Independent	137,905	4.99%	1
Valid votes	2,764,475	90.01%	16
Invalid votes	306,717	9.99%	
Turnout	3,071,192	77.93%	
Registered voters	3,941,002	100.00%	

== Bohol ==
Each of Bohol's three legislative districts will elect each representative to the House of Representatives. The candidate with the highest number of votes wins the seat.

=== 1st District ===
Edgar M. Chatto (Lakas-Kampi-CMD) is the incumbent, but he is ineligible for re-election since he is on his third consecutive term already. Former governor Rene Relampagos will run in his place; he is running under the Laban ng Demokratikong Pilipino although Lakas-Kampi-CMD is also supporting his candidacy.

Candidate	Party	Votes	%
Rene Relampagos	Laban ng Demokratikong Pilipino	92,220	50.52
Edgar Kapirig	Liberal Party	45,561	24.96
Oscar Glovasa	Nationalist People's Coalition	43,674	23.92
Mario Magat Jr.	Independent	1,096	0.60
Total		182,551	100.00
Valid votes		182,551	90.42
Invalid/blank votes		19,333	9.58
Total votes		201,884	100.00
Laban ng Demokratikong Pilipino gain from Lakas–Kampi–CMD			
Source: Commission on Elections

=== 2nd District ===
Roberto Cajes is the incumbent, but he is ineligible for re-election since he is on his third consecutive term already. Lakas-Kampi-CMD initially nominated Erico B. Aumentado as their candidate in this district, but Aumentado was expelled from the party because of his alleged association with Manny Villar, the presidential nominee of the rival Nacionalista Party. Lakas-Kampi-CMD then sent a certificate of nomination to incumbent congressman Roberto Cajes' wife Judith.

Candidate	Party	Votes	%
Erico Aumentado	Independent	100,391	57.14
Judith Cajes	Lakas–Kampi–CMD	61,383	34.94
Danilo Mendez	Liberal Party	11,131	6.34
Rolando Manatad	Pwersa ng Masang Pilipino	2,790	1.59
Total		175,695	100.00
Valid votes		175,695	90.21
Invalid/blank votes		19,070	9.79
Total votes		194,765	100.00
Independent gain from Lakas–Kampi–CMD			
Source: Commission on Elections

=== 3rd District ===
Adam Relson Jala (Lakas-Kampi-CMD) is the incumbent. But Jala decided not to run for a second term this election. He ran for provincial vice-governorship but later dropped his candidacy to support his uncle, Elpidio Jala, who is also running for vice governor. Secretary of Agriculture Arthur C. Yap is running instead unopposed, currently the only Cabinet official not facing opposition.

Candidate	Party	Votes	%
Arthur C. Yap	Lakas–Kampi–CMD	158,344	100.00
Total		158,344	100.00
Valid votes		158,344	74.05
Invalid/blank votes		55,501	25.95
Total votes		213,845	100.00
Lakas–Kampi–CMD hold			
Source: Commission on Elections

== Cebu ==
Local party One Cebu is affiliated with Lakas-Kampi-CMD. The party designations are as designated by the official COMELEC list.

=== 1st District ===
Incumbent Eduardo Gullas is also supported by Lakas-Kampi-CMD and its affiliate One Cebu.

Candidate	Party	Votes	%
Eduardo Gullas (incumbent)	Nacionalista Party	209,208	92.91
Luna Sabalones	Pwersa ng Masang Pilipino	10,527	4.67
Felipe Concepcion	Independent	5,449	2.42
Total		225,184	100.00
Valid votes		225,184	86.54
Invalid/blank votes		35,039	13.46
Total votes		260,223	100.00
Nacionalista Party hold			
Source: Commission on Elections

=== 2nd District ===
Pablo P. Garcia is the incumbent.

Candidate	Party	Votes	%
Pablo P. Garcia (incumbent)	Lakas–Kampi–CMD	117,670	65.64
Cora-Lou Kintanar	Liberal Party	61,597	34.36
Total		179,267	100.00
Valid votes		179,267	83.90
Invalid/blank votes		34,396	16.10
Total votes		213,663	100.00
Lakas–Kampi–CMD hold			
Source: Commission on Elections

=== 3rd District ===
Pablo John Garcia is the incumbent.

Candidate	Party	Votes	%
Pablo John Garcia (incumbent)	Lakas–Kampi–CMD	127,730	61.61
Antonio Yapha Jr.	Liberal Party	79,604	38.39
Total		207,334	100.00
Valid votes		207,334	89.43
Invalid/blank votes		24,496	10.57
Total votes		231,830	100.00
Lakas–Kampi–CMD hold			
Source: Commission on Elections

=== 4th District ===
Celestino Martinez III is the pending incumbent after Benhur Salimbangon was unseated by the Supreme Court due to poll fraud. The case is under a motion for reconsideration. Martinez may not be seated until the last week of January as Congress will adjourn for election-campaigning. Martinez was able to take office on May 25, just over a month left into his term, after swearing in the plenary, after Salimbangon's proclamation as the winner of the 2010 election.

Candidate	Party	Votes	%
Benhur Salimbangon (incumbent)	Lakas–Kampi–CMD	137,324	67.48
Celestino Martinez III	Liberal Party	66,165	32.52
Total		203,489	100.00
Valid votes		203,489	93.76
Invalid/blank votes		13,549	6.24
Total votes		217,038	100.00
Lakas–Kampi–CMD hold			
Source: Commission on Elections

=== 5th District ===
Incumbent Ramon Durano VI is also co-nominated by One Cebu and Lakas-Kampi-CMD.

Candidate	Party	Votes	%
Ramon Durano VI (incumbent)	Nationalist People's Coalition	163,874	78.66
Jesus Durano Jr.	Liberal Party	24,441	11.73
Gilbert Wagas	Pwersa ng Masang Pilipino	16,057	7.71
Adonis Montecillo	Independent	3,951	1.90
Total		208,323	100.00
Valid votes		208,323	86.27
Invalid/blank votes		33,156	13.73
Total votes		241,479	100.00
Nationalist People's Coalition hold			
Source: Commission on Elections

=== 6th District ===
Lapu-Lapu City was given its own legislative district prior to the election.

Incumbent Nerissa Corazon Soon-Ruiz switched from the Lakas-Kampi-CMD to the Nacionalista Party on March 29, 2010. She is in her third consecutive term already and is ineligible for reelection. She will instead run for Mayor of Mandaue City. Lakas-Kampi-CMD and One Cebu nominated Gabriel Luis Quisumbing as their candidate in this district.

Candidate	Party	Votes	%
Gabriel Luis Quisumbing	Lakas–Kampi–CMD	113,996	61.70
Ariston Cortes III	Liberal Party	54,979	29.76
Victor Biaño	Independent	15,770	8.54
Total		184,745	100.00
Valid votes		184,745	91.57
Invalid/blank votes		16,997	8.43
Total votes		201,742	100.00
Lakas–Kampi–CMD gain from Nacionalista Party			
Source: Commission on Elections

== Cebu City ==
Local party Bando Osmeña – Pundok Kauswagan (BO-PK) is affiliated with the Liberal Party.

=== 1st District ===
Incumbent Raul del Mar (Liberal) is in third consecutive term already and is ineligible for reelection. His daughter, Rachel is his party's nominee as well its affiliate Bando Osmeña – Pundok Kauswagan.

Candidate	Party	Votes	%
Rachel del Mar	Liberal Party	98,501	58.49
Mary Ann de los Santos	Kugi Uswag Sugbo	58,492	34.73
Jacinto del Mar	Philippine Green Republican Party	5,555	3.30
Isabelo Osmeña Sr.	Independent	2,405	1.43
Francisco Ashley Acedillo	Independent	2,052	1.22
Florencio Villarin	Independent	1,082	0.64
Juan Arenasa	Independent	179	0.11
Miguel Selim	Independent	151	0.09
Total		168,417	100.00
Valid votes		168,417	94.16
Invalid/blank votes		10,442	5.84
Total votes		178,859	100.00
Liberal Party hold			
Source: Commission on Elections

=== 2nd District ===
Incumbent Antonio Cuenco is in third consecutive term already and is ineligible for reelection. He was appointed as Secretary-General of the ASEAN Inter-Parliamentary Assembly (AIPA) on February 4, 2010. Two of his three parties, Lakas-Kampi-CMD and the Probinsya Muna Development Initiative (PROMDI) did not nominate a candidate to run in this district. However, the Kugi Uswag Sugbo (Kusug) nominated businessman Jonathan Guardo as their candidate which is affiliated with the Nacionalista Party.

Cebu City mayor Tomas Osmeña, who is in his third consecutive as mayor and is ineligible for reelection as mayor, is running for Congress under the Liberal Party and its affiliate Bando Osmeña – Pundok Kauswagan.

Candidate	Party	Votes	%
Tomas Osmeña	Liberal Party	125,575	64.44
Jonathan Guardo	Kugi Uswag Sugbo	67,652	34.72
Makilito Mahinay	Independent	600	0.31
Edgaar Abadiano	Independent	593	0.30
Lea Ong	Independent	457	0.23
Total		194,877	100.00
Valid votes		194,877	93.86
Invalid/blank votes		12,752	6.14
Total votes		207,629	100.00
Liberal Party gain from Lakas–Kampi–CMD			
Source: Commission on Elections

== Lapu-Lapu City ==
Lapu-Lapu City is going to elect their first congressman this election. They were formerly included in Cebu's 6th district.

Candidate	Party	Votes	%
Arturo Radaza	Lakas–Kampi–CMD	70,125	56.33
Joselito Ruiz	Nationalist People's Coalition	33,100	26.59
Eugenio Espedido	Liberal Party	20,809	16.71
Rolando Lejarde	Independent	461	0.37
Total		124,495	100.00
Valid votes		124,495	92.46
Invalid/blank votes		10,158	7.54
Total votes		134,653	100.00
Lakas–Kampi–CMD gain			
Source: Commission on Elections

== Negros Oriental ==
=== 1st District ===
Jocelyn Limkaichong is the incumbent.

Candidate	Party	Votes	%
Jocelyn Limkaichong (incumbent)	Liberal Party	106,255	63.95
Jacinto Paras	Lakas–Kampi–CMD	59,474	35.79
Danilo Roble	Independent	423	0.25
Total		166,152	100.00
Valid votes		166,152	93.64
Invalid/blank votes		11,294	6.36
Total votes		177,446	100.00
Liberal Party hold			
Source: Commission on Elections

=== 2nd District ===
George Arnaiz is the incumbent.

Candidate	Party	Votes	%
George Arnaiz (incumbent)	Nationalist People's Coalition	115,384	59.26
Hector Villanueva	Liberal Party	76,680	39.38
Raul Aniñon	Independent	1,436	0.74
Himiniano Silva	Independent	1,203	0.62
Total		194,703	100.00
Valid votes		194,703	91.47
Invalid/blank votes		18,150	8.53
Total votes		212,853	100.00
Nationalist People's Coalition hold			
Source: Commission on Elections

=== 3rd District ===
Pryde Henry Teves is the incumbent.

Candidate	Party	Votes	%
Pryde Henry Teves (incumbent)	Lakas–Kampi–CMD	92,911	66.12
Marcelo Adanza	Nationalist People's Coalition	43,905	31.24
Telesforo Diao Jr.	Liberal Party	3,709	2.64
Total		140,525	100.00
Valid votes		140,525	85.91
Invalid/blank votes		23,051	14.09
Total votes		163,576	100.00
Lakas–Kampi–CMD hold			
Source: Commission on Elections

== Siquijor ==
Orlando Fua (Lakas-Kampi-CMD) is the incumbent.

Candidate	Party	Votes	%
Orlando Fua (incumbent)	Lakas–Kampi–CMD	33,509	66.52
Dingdong Avanzado	Partido Demokratiko Sosyalista ng Pilipinas	10,094	20.04
Grace Sumalpong	Liberal Party	6,565	13.03
Jesus Flor	Independent	206	0.41
Total		50,374	100.00
Valid votes		50,374	95.29
Invalid/blank votes		2,489	4.71
Total votes		52,863	100.00
Lakas–Kampi–CMD hold			
Source: Commission on Elections
