= List of barangays in Toledo, Cebu =

Toledo City is politically subdivided into 38 barangays.

The city is part of the 3rd legislative district of the Province of Cebu.

As of 2015, 12 barangays are classified as urban barangays where 90,114 (52.90%) of Toledo City's population lives, while the remaining 26 rural barangays are home to 80,221 residents, representing 47.10% of the total population.

Poblacion is the most populous barangay in the city with a population of 13,383 while Sagay is the least populous barangay with only 1,145 residents. Biga recorded a 60.26% increase in population, the highest in the city while Sagay decreased 28.66% in terms of population.

== List of Barangays ==
Barangays of Toledo City
| Administration | | Population | | | PSGC Code and Class | |
| Barangay | Barangay Captain (Since June 30, 2019) | 2015 | 2010 | Change | Code | Urban/Rural |
|---|---|---|---|---|---|---|
| Awihao | Erlinda P. Canillo | 4,207 | 3,823 | +10.04% | 072251001 | Rural |
| Bagakay | Ramon B. Ragodos | 2,485 | 1,690 | +47.04% | 072251002 | Rural |
| Bato | Rosalio L. Cereño, Jr. | 8,173 | 7,585 | +7.75% | 072251003 | Urban |
| Biga | Pedro H. Sepada, Jr. | 3,327 | 2,076 | +60.26% | 072251004 | Rural |
| Bulongan | Ferlita P. David | 2,647 | 2,359 | +12.21% | 072251005 | Rural |
| Bunga | Leonardo V. Oralde | 3,868 | 3,409 | +13.46% | 072251006 | Rural |
| Cabitoonan | Gerardo M. Lazarte | 4,154 | 3,782 | +9.84% | 072251007 | Rural |
| Calongcalong | Edwina M. Cababa | 1,535 | 1,327 | +15.67% | 072251008 | Rural |
| Cambang‑ug | Manuel P. Madrid | 3,668 | 3,537 | +3.70% | 072251009 | Rural |
| Camp 8 | Wilfredo L. Obeso | 2,529 | 1,776 | +42.40% | 072251010 | Rural |
| Canlumampao | Irene A. Gerale | 4,170 | 3,523 | +18.37% | 072251011 | Rural |
| Cantabaco | Bernardo B. Villarin | 7,304 | 6,638 | +10.03% | 072251012 | Urban |
| Capitan Claudio | Alberto B. Nadela | 4,311 | 3,877 | +11.19% | 072251013 | Rural |
| Carmen | Alejandro Z. Madrid | 3,858 | 3,505 | +10.07% | 072251014 | Rural |
| Daanglungsod | Rogelio J. Maybuena | 2,933 | 2,802 | +4.68% | 072251015 | Urban |
| Don Andres Soriano (Lutopan) | Jose Jeffrey R. Cabrera | 12,764 | 15,333 | −16.75% | 072251016 | Urban |
| Dumlog | Alberto T. Reoyan | 5,288 | 4,155 | +27.27% | 072251017 | Rural |
| Gen. Climaco (Malubog) | Richard D. Candilada | 6,337 | 5,521 | +14.78% | 072251024 | Urban |
| Ibo | Bonn A. Pahaganas | 3,699 | 3,602 | +2.69% | 072251018 | Rural |
| Ilihan | Dimpna D. Gabuya | 3,206 | 3,344 | −4.13% | 072251019 | Rural |
| Juan Climaco, Sr. (Magdugo) | Walter N. Lao | 6,279 | 5,568 | +12.77% | 072251023 | Urban |
| Landahan | Edwin C. Baugbog | 3,206 | 3,344 | −4.13% | 072251019 | Rural |
| Loay | Junalyn Alicaba | 1,501 | 1,452 | +3.37% | 072251021 | Rural |
| Luray II | Antonio G. Candol, Jr. | 4,640 | 4,391 | +5.67% | 072251022 | Urban |
| Matab‑ang | Odilio G. Mendoza | 9,868 | 9,124 | +8.15% | 072251025 | Urban |
| Media Once | Alferez L. Hilario | 7,128 | 6,477 | +10.05% | 072251026 | Urban |
| Pangamihan | Milagros B. Abad | 2,333 | 1,653 | +41.14% | 072251027 | Rural |
| Poblacion | Faustino D. Barcenas | 13,383 | 13,492 | −0.81% | 072251028 | Urban |
| Poog | Clariza Z. Alferez | 5,989 | 5,665 | +5.72% | 072251029 | Urban |
| Putingbato | Rolly E. Caburnay | 1,413 | 1,448 | −2.42% | 072251030 | Rural |
| Sagay | Jimbo L. Luza | 1,145 | 1,605 | −28.66% | 072251031 | Rural |
| Sam‑ang | Zosimo P. Verano | 1,719 | 1,649 | +4.24% | 072251032 | Rural |
| Sangi | Erlain B. Sigue | 4,201 | 3,835 | +9.54% | 072251033 | Rural |
| Santo Niño (Mainggit) | Amada Amid A. Baron | 5,316 | 4,320 | +23.06% | 072251034 | Urban |
| Subayon | Florante M. Lariba | 1,432 | 1,153 | +24.20% | 072251035 | Rural |
| Talavera | Edgar L. Dejito | 6,041 | 4,972 | +21.50% | 072251037 | Rural |
| Tubod | Jeffrey E. Lebumfacil, Sr. | 4,128 | 3,329 | +24.00% | 072251038 | Rural |
| Tungkay | Wilfredo M. Labajo | 1,173 | 1,471 | −20.26% | 072251037 | Rural |
| Toledo City | | 170,335 | 157,078 | | | |
Source: Philippine Statistics Authority - Philippine Standard Geographic Code - Toledo City - Barangays
