= List of senators of the Philippines in the 12th Congress by seniority =

This is a complete list of senators of the Philippines during the 12th Congress of the Philippines listed by seniority from June 30, 2001, to June 30, 2004.

The criteria for seniority used in this article are derived from the cumulative length of service of a member of the Senate prior to the current Congress. Although an official roster ranking senators by seniority is not publicly available, their total cumulative years of service have been used to determine seniority. It has long been customary, following the practice of the United States Senate, to elect the most senior senator as either president of the Senate or president pro tempore, although this practice has become less common in the modern Senate. Furthermore, seniority is traditionally considered in the selection of chairpersons of major Senate committees.

In cases where senators have equal cumulative service, seniority is determined by the following criteria, in order:

- Longest uninterrupted period of service
- Earlier date on which the cumulative length of service was achieved
- Alphabetical order of surnames

In this Congress, John Henry Osmeña was the most senior senator, having previously served 11 years in Senate, while Manny Villar was the most junior senator.

== List of senators by seniority ==
Rank	Senator	Party		Length of previous tenures (Dates of previous tenures)	Notes
Rank	Senator	Start of Congress	End of Congress	Length of previous tenures (Dates of previous tenures)	Notes
1	John Henry Osmeña	NPC		11 years, 268 days (December 30, 1971 – September 23, 1972; June 30, 1987 – June 30, 1995; June 30, 1998 – June 30, 2001)	
2	Edgardo Angara	LDP		11 years, 0 days (June 30, 1987 – June 30, 1998)	
3	Blas Ople	LDP		9 years, 0 days (June 30, 1992 – June 30, 2001)	Resigned on July 29, 2002, upon being appointed as Secretary of Foreign Affairs.
4	Ramon Revilla Sr.	Lakas		9 years, 0 days (June 30, 1992 – June 30, 2001)	
5	Tito Sotto	LDP		9 years, 0 days (June 30, 1992 – June 30, 2001)	
6	Nene Pimentel	PDP–Laban		8 years, 0 days (June 30, 1987 – June 30, 1992; June 30, 1998 – June 30, 2001)	
7	Rodolfo Biazon	LDP	Liberal (Note: Rodolfo Biazon was affiliated with Aksyon Demokratiko in 2004.)	6 years, 0 days (June 30, 1992 – June 30, 1995, June 30, 1998 – June 30, 2001)	
8	Franklin Drilon	Independent	Liberal	6 years, 0 days (June 30, 1995 – June 30, 2001)	Senate president
9	Juan Flavier	Lakas		6 years, 0 days (June 30, 1995 – June 30, 2001)	Senate president pro tempore (from August 12, 2002)
10	Gregorio Honasan	Independent		6 years, 0 days (June 30, 1995 – June 30, 2001)	Elected on May 14, 2001, to succeed Teofisto Guingona Jr., who was appointed as Vice President of the Philippines on February 7, 2001. Took office on June 30, 2001.
11	Ramon Magsaysay Jr.	Lakas		6 years, 0 days (June 30, 1995 – June 30, 2001)	
12	Serge Osmeña	PDP–Laban		6 years, 0 days (June 30, 1995 – June 30, 2001)	
13	Tessie Aquino-Oreta	LDP		3 years, 0 days (June 30, 1998 – June 30, 2001)	
14	Robert Barbers	Lakas		3 years, 0 days (June 30, 1998 – June 30, 2001)	
15	Rene Cayetano	Lakas		3 years, 0 days (June 30, 1998 – June 30, 2001)	Died on June 25, 2003.
16	Loren Legarda	Lakas	Independent	3 years, 0 days (June 30, 1998 – June 30, 2001)	
17	Robert Jaworski	Lakas		3 years, 0 days (June 30, 1998 – June 30, 2001)	
18	Joker Arroyo	Lakas	Independent		
19	Noli de Castro	Independent			Resigned on June 29, 2004, upon taking office as Vice President of the Philippines.
20	Loi Ejercito	Independent	PMP		
21	Panfilo Lacson	LDP	Independent		
22	Kiko Pangilinan	Liberal			
23	Ralph Recto	Lakas	Nacionalista		
24	Manny Villar	Independent	Nacionalista		Senate president pro tempore (until August 12, 2002)
