= Karen Flores-Garcia =

Filipino politician (born 1974)

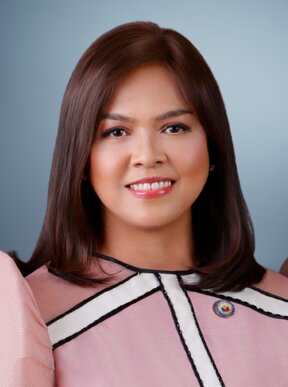
- Official portrait, 2025

Member of the Philippine House of Representatives from Cebu's 3rd district
- Incumbent
- Assumed office June 30, 2025
- Preceded by: Pablo John Garcia

Personal details
- Born: Karen Hope Flores; November 8, 1974 (age 51) Cebu City, Cebu, Philippines
- Party: NUP (2024–present); 1CEBU (2024–present)
- Spouse: Pablo John Garcia (m. 2004)
- Relatives: Gwendolyn Garcia (sister-in-law); Winston Garcia (brother-in-law)
- Education: University of the Philippines Cebu (BA)

Karen Hope Flores-Garcia (born November 8, 1974) is a Filipino politician who is a member of the House of Representatives for Cebu's 3rd congressional district, serving since 2025.

She is a journalist by profession. The National Unity Party substituted her for her husband Pablo John Garcia.

== Congressional career ==
On May 11, 2026, Flores-Garcia voted against the second impeachment of Vice President Sara Duterte, matching the vote of her husband Pablo John Garcia against the first impeachment of Duterte in 2025.

== See also ==
- List of female members of the House of Representatives of the Philippines
- 20th Congress of the Philippines
