= Pablo P. Garcia =

Filipino politician (1925–2021)

The Honorable Pablo Garcia
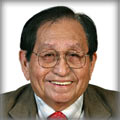
- Official portrait, 2010

Deputy Speaker of the House of Representatives of the Philippines for Visayas
- In office May 2008 – June 30, 2013
- Preceded by: Raul Del Mar
- Succeeded by: Sergio Apostol

Member of the Philippine House of Representatives from Cebu
- In office June 30, 2007 – June 30, 2013
- Preceded by: Simeon Kintanar
- Succeeded by: Wilfredo S. Caminero
- Constituency: 2nd District
- In office June 30, 1987 – June 30, 1995
- Preceded by: Post Established
- Succeeded by: John Henry Osmeña
- Constituency: 3rd District

24th Governor of Cebu
- In office June 30, 1995 – June 30, 2004
- Vice Governor: Apolonio A. Abines Jr. (1995–1998); Fernando S. Celeste (1998–2001); John Gregory H. Osmeña Jr. (2001–2004)
- Preceded by: Vicente L. dela Serna
- Succeeded by: Gwendolyn F. Garcia

Vice Governor of Cebu
- In office December 30, 1969 – December 30, 1971
- Governor: Osmundo G. Rama
- Preceded by: Osmundo G. Rama
- Succeeded by: Salutario J. Fernandez

Personal details
- Born: Pablo García y Parás; September 25, 1925 Dumanjug, Cebu
- Died: August 18, 2021 (aged 95)
- Party: NUP (2011–2021); 1CEBU (2007–2021)
- Other political affiliations: Lakas (1992–1998; 2008–2011); KAMPI (2007–2008); PROMDI (1998–2004); Panaghiusa (1987–1992)
- Spouse: Esperanza Fiel (m. 1954; died 2016)
- Children: 8, including Gwen, Winston, and Pablo John
- Relatives: Garcia family
- Education: University of San Carlos
- Occupation: Lawyer
- Profession: Politician
- Nickname(s): Pabling Garcia, Noy Pabling

Pablo Paras Garcia (September 25, 1925 – August 18, 2021) was a Filipino lawyer and politician who was the patriarch of the Garcia political clan of Province of Cebu. He was a longtime congressman and governor.

== Early career ==
A topnotcher in the 1951 Bar Examinations (3rd place), he was a distinguished trial lawyer, law professor, and respected constitutionalist. Garcia was an opposition lawyer during the Marcos Sr. dictatorship. He is one of the many lawyers who helped the opposition in Cebu when 1986 snap elections happen.

== Political career ==
Garcia served as governor of Cebu from 1995 to 2004. He had previously served as the vice-governor of Cebu from 1969 to 1971. Garcia has been elected to three terms as a Member of the House of Representatives of the Philippines. From 1987 to 1995, Garcia represented the Third District of Cebu. He was again elected to Congress in 2007, this time representing the Second District of Cebu. He was defeated in his bid for re-election in 2013.

His daughter Gwendolyn succeeded him as governor in 2004, while his son Pablo John was elected to Garcia's previous congressional seat in 2007. In 2007, the Garcia family established the One Cebu political party. Garcia was also a member of Lakas Kampi CMD.

His son, Byron, the former security consultant for the Cebu provincial government, gained attention in 2007 after instituting a program of choreographed exercise routines for the inmates of the Cebu Provincial Detention and Rehabilitation Center (CPDRC) and uploading the routines on YouTube, including the popular Thriller viral video. Garcia's other son, Winston Garcia, is the former president and general manager of the Government Service Insurance System (Philippines) and the official candidate of One Cebu for provincial governor on May 9 (date of 2016 Philippine general election).

In 2010, his son Nelson Gamaliel was elected in large margin as Mayor of Dumanjug, Cebu. At the same time Marlon, the younger brother of Nelson Gamaliel was also elected Vice-Mayor of the Municipality of Barili, Cebu.

He was elected Chairman of the Committee on Revision of Laws on 7 August 2007; and, when the House leadership was changed, he was consequently appointed Deputy Speaker in May 2008.

House of Representatives of the Philippines
Preceded by Eduardo Gullas	Member of the House of Representatives from Cebu's 3rd district 1987–1995	Succeeded by John Henry Osmena
Preceded by Simeon Kintanar	Member of the House of Representatives from Cebu's 2nd district 2007–2013	Succeeded by Wilfredo Caminero
Political offices
Preceded by Vicente dela Serna	Governor of Cebu; 1995–2004	Succeeded by Gwendolyn Garcia
Preceded by Osmundo Rama	Vice Governor of Cebu; 1969–1971	Succeeded by Salutario Fernandez
