= Máximo Macapobre =

Don Máximo Macapobre was a 19th-century Philippines leader and activist, one of the founders of New Hinulawan (1863–1869), now part of Toledo, Cebu, in the Philippines. Little is known about his life except for stories handed down to his scions still living in Bato. His nickname was Kapitan Imok. He often denounced the abuses of the guardia civil (the police) and the oppression brought upon by tax collectors. He defied the Spanish Empire authorities by refusing to be drafted in the military service.

== Early life ==
He was born in Valencia, Carcar, Cebu as Máximo Tanudtanod. Imok's father was Amadeo. Concerned for the safety of his son, he sneaked Imok to Bato. To hide their identities, they changed their family name from Tanudtanod to Macapobre. In Bato, Imok settled for good and married a beautiful lass, a certain lady named Sumilhig, with whom he begot eight children, namely: Ángel, Victorina, Potenciana, Regino, María, Severino, Baldomero,, and the other one whose name are lost to history.

As a resident of Bato (formerly known as Batohanon) and having a family of his own, Captain Imok, as he was now called by the people of his barangay (district) showed his concern for the welfare of his community and for the quality of life for his people.

He was an ordinary man, Imok possessed an extraordinary desire to provide for his family a green pasture which served as his inspiration to work hard. He was able to own and operate an "intosan" - the old system of milling sugar cane to produce sugar which was constructed in sitio Tipoo, Bato. The sugar was then sold in Hinulawan, the old name of Toledo.

In Hinulawan, he was invited to a council composed of other leaders in the area, to establish the new town. The new town and its present location is called Toledo upon suggestion of the alcalde mayor of Cebu whose place of origin was Toledo, Spain.
