= Winston Garcia =

Filipino lawyer (born 1958)

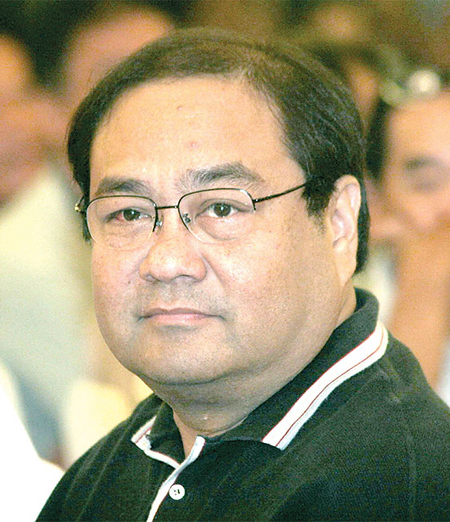

President & General Manager of the Government Services Insurance System
- In office 2001–2010
- President: Gloria Macapagal Arroyo
- Preceded by: Federico C. Pascual
- Succeeded by: Robert G. Vergara

Member of the Cebu Provincial Board
- In office April 1986 – June 30, 1995
- Governor: Osmundo Rama; Lito Osmeña; Vicente dela Serna

Personal details
- Born: Winston Fiel Garcia; May 21, 1958 (age 68) Cebu, Philippines
- Party: 1CEBU (2015–present); PDP–Laban (2016–present)
- Other political affiliations: UNA (2015–2016)
- Spouse: Isabel "Chabeng" Garcia
- Children: 5
- Parent(s): Pablo P. Garcia; Esperanza “Inday” Fiel-Garcia
- Relatives: Gwendolyn Garcia (sister); Pablo John Garcia (brother)
- Education: Southwestern University (AA); University of Santo Tomas (BPhil); San Beda College (LL.B)
- Occupation: Corporate CEO and director, politician
- Profession: Lawyer

Winston Fiel Garcia (born May 21, 1958) is a Filipino lawyer, and corporate leader who has served as the director and board member of several of the biggest institutions in the Philippines such as the Philippine Stock Exchange, San Miguel Corporation, Meralco and is currently the chairman of the Garcia-owned Cebu CFI Cooperative. He was formerly the general manager and president of Government Service Insurance System.

== Personal life ==
Garcia was born and raised in Cebu, Philippines, to a family of lawyers. He is the son of former Deputy Speaker Pablo P. Garcia and Cebu CFI Community founder, retired judge Esperanza “Inday” Fiel Garcia. He is the brother of Cebu governor Gwendolyn Garcia and Cebu 3rd District Congressman Pablo John Garcia. Winston is married to Isabel, an architect and the president of the Zonta Club International Cebu Chapter. They both have 5 children.

== Academic life ==
Garcia attended law school at the San Beda College of Law, while also taking up Associate in Arts at the Southwestern University in Cebu City and Bachelor of Philosophy at the University of Santo Tomas-Central Seminary.

Garcia's track record as a public servant includes his position as chairman of Cebu Provincial Committee on Good Government, Committee on Laws and Ordinances and executive committee on Anti-Graft and Corrupt Practices.

Garcia was conferred an honorary doctorate degree in public administration by the Polytechnic University of the Philippines.

== As general manager and president of GSIS ==
Garcia overhauled the near-bankrupt GSIS into the most profitable government enterprise in the Philippines.

He intensified collection, eliminated fraud, launched aggressive marketing of new products and services to members, and instituted practical reforms in GSIS investment activities. He also purged entries of deceased members from the GSIS rolls.

=== GSIS assets increased by 500 billion pesos (US$10 billion) during his 9-year tenure ===
When GSIS was on the cusp of bankruptcy, Garcia employed several technological and managerial reforms which saved the corporation. In the span of 9 years, Garcia was able to generate nearly 500 billion pesos (US$10 billion) for the GSIS conglomerate.

=== GSIS e-Card and G-V@PS ===
Garcia delivered the 1.5 million GSIS members into the Digital Age by embarking on the eCard Plus System, the GSIS Wireless Automated Processing System (G-W@PS) and the GSIS Voice Activated Processing System (G-V@PS). These programs enabled GSIS members to enjoy their GSIS benefits and loan privileges anytime and anywhere—using automated, paperless, secure, and wireless systems.

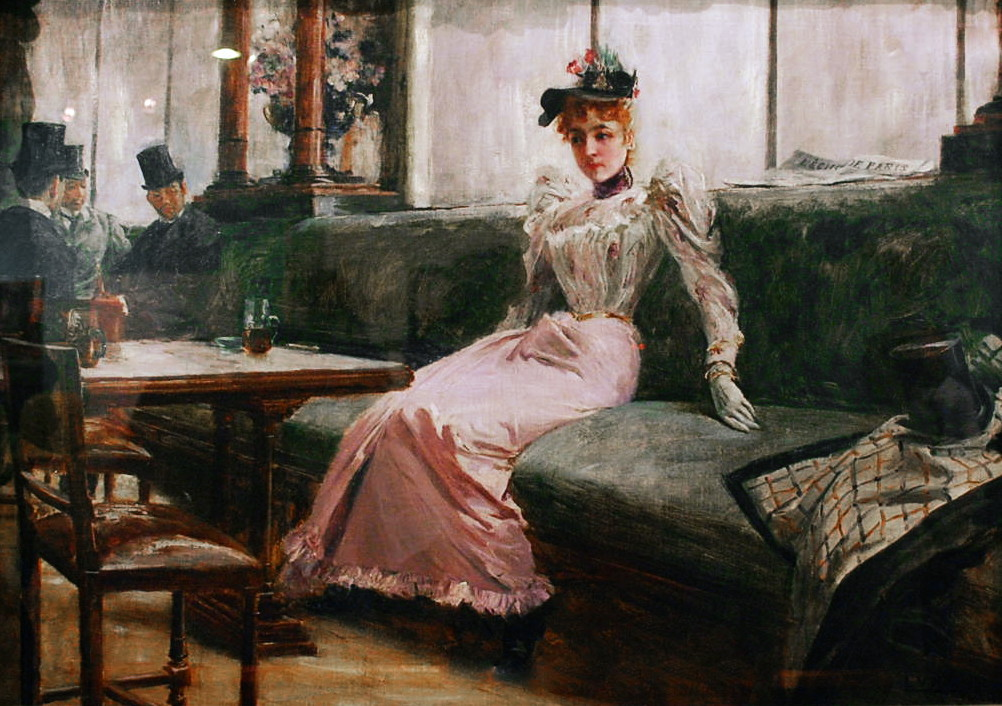
Juan Luna's "The Parisian Life".

=== Juan Luna's "The Parisian Life" ===
One of the most controversial paintings to date is Juan Luna's "The Parisian Life" which is now exhibited to the public at the Philippine National Museum.

An oil painting dated 1892, the painting was purchased in 2002 by Garcia at an auction in Christie's, Hong Kong, for ₱46 million. This raised questions over whether government workers' money was being properly used. The Commission on Audit (COA) filed a case against Garcia for graft and grave misconduct.

Garcia's decision to purchase a piece of history was proven to be a worthy investment for GSIS after COA decided to reconsider its disallowance of the purchase of the painting in 2012. The painting, which was purchased initially at ₱46 million, is now worth ₱300 million.

== Career in business management ==
Garcia is the former chairman of the National Reinsurance Corporation; the GSIS Mutual Fund, Inc.; and the ASEAN Forum Inc. He also serves as the Vice Chairman of the Philippine Social Security Association and board member of the ASEAN Social Security.

Garcia used to sit as an independent director of San Miguel Corporation and director of the Philippine National Construction Corporation; and the Philippine Health Insurance Corporation.

He is a member of the International Social Security Association, International Insurance Society Inc and the International Insurance Society, Inc.

=== Notable positions held ===
- Director of the Philippine Stock Exchange
- Director of Asean Social Security Association
- Chairman of the board at National Reinsurance Corporation
- Meralco director from May 2004 to April 2005
- Independent director of Manila Electric Co. from February 26, 2008, to January 2009
- Independent director for San Miguel Corporation since February 1, 2001
- Chairman of Equitable Card Network, Inc., PCIB Securities, Inc. and Equitable Savings Bank, Inc

== Political life ==
Garcia served in the Provincial Board of Cebu for two terms, from April 1986 to June 1995. As provincial board member, he is credited for developing the P1 billion bond program of Cebu that raised funds to finance the province's infrastructure, triggering the Ce-boom phenomenon.

A lawyer by profession, he was the gubernatorial candidate of One Cebu Party for the 2016 Cebu elections. Nerissa Soon Ruiz was his running mate for Vice Governor in the May 9 election against the incumbent Cebu Governor Hilario Davide III and Vice Governor Agnes Magpale of Liberal Party (Philippines).

On February 16, 2016, Binay's party United Nationalist Alliance and One Cebu party (with former GSIS chairman Garcia as the party's gubernatorial bet in Cebu local elections, 2016) form a local coalition in the province of Cebu during the local party's general assembly.

Garcia had openly challenged incumbent Cebu governor Davide to a public debate, but Davide refused, commenting that it was "a waste of time.". On his side, Winston Garcia urges COMELEC to organize local debate. "A debate is a venue for voters to learn about a candidates platform. It will help guide them in identifying which leader has the better program," Garcia said.
