= John Henry Osmeña =

Filipino politician (1935–2021)

John Henry R. Osmeña
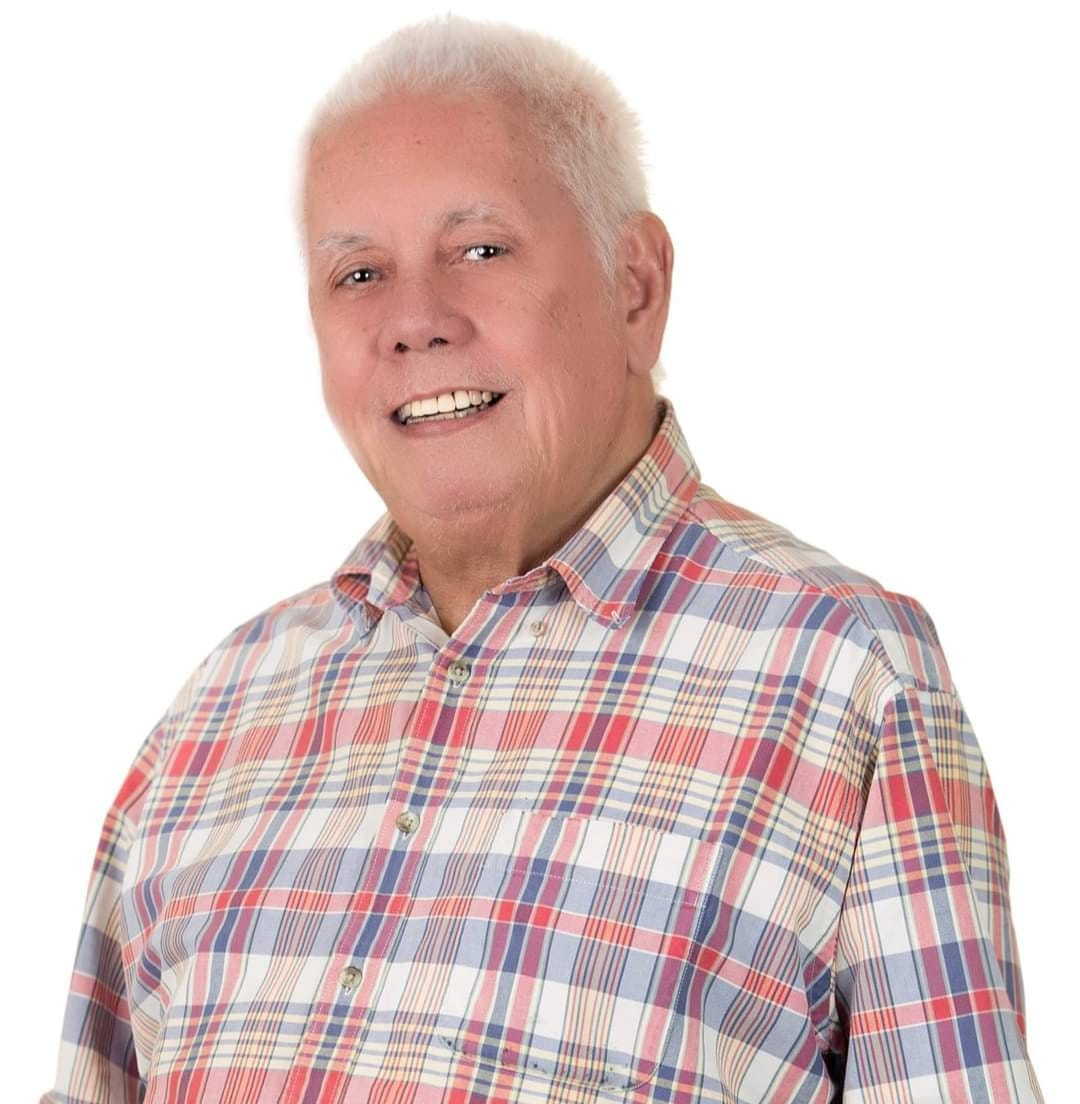

Senator of the Philippines
- In office June 30, 1998 – June 30, 2004
- In office June 30, 1987 – June 30, 1995
- In office December 30, 1971 – September 23, 1972

President pro tempore of the Senate of the Philippines
- In office June 29, 1999 – July 12, 2000
- President: Joseph Estrada
- Preceded by: Blas Ople
- Succeeded by: Blas Ople

Member of the House of Representatives of the Philippines from Cebu
- In office June 30, 1995 – June 30, 1998
- Preceded by: Pablo Garcia
- Succeeded by: Antonio Yapha Jr.
- Constituency: 3rd district
- In office December 30, 1969 – December 30, 1971
- Preceded by: Jose Briones
- Succeeded by: Crisologo Abines
- Constituency: 2nd district

Mayor of Toledo
- In office June 30, 2013 – June 30, 2019
- Vice Mayor: Antonio Yapha Jr.
- Preceded by: Aurelio Espinosa
- Succeeded by: Marjorie Perales

Mayor of Cebu City
- Officer in Charge
- In office March 25, 1986 – March 19, 1987
- Vice Mayor: Jose Veloso Cuenco
- Preceded by: Ronald Duterte
- Succeeded by: Jose Veloso Cuenco (OIC)

Vice Mayor of Cebu City
- In office January 3, 1968 – December 30, 1969
- Mayor: Eulogio Borres
- Preceded by: Eulogio Borres
- Succeeded by: Jose Rodriguez

Councilor of Cebu City
- In office December 30, 1963 – December 30, 1967

Personal details
- Born: John Henry Renner Osmeña; January 17, 1935 Cebu, Cebu, Philippine Islands
- Died: February 2, 2021 (aged 86) Cebu City, Philippines
- Party: Independent (2004–2007, 2009–2012, 2015–2021)
- Other political affiliations: UNO (2007–2009); NPC (1992–1995, 2001–2004, 2012–2015); LDP (1995–2001); Liberal (1963–1992; 2009)
- Spouse: Lucy Urgello (m. 1969, separated)
- Children: John Gregory Osmeña
- Education: University of San Carlos (BS); University of the Philippines; International Social Development Institution
- Occupation: Politician

John Henry Renner Osmeña (January 17, 1935 – February 2, 2021), also known as Sonny Osmeña or simply John Osmeña, was the grandson of Philippine President Sergio Osmeña. He served as a senator of the Philippines from 1971 to 1972, 1987 to 1995, and 1998 to 2004. He was the last surviving senator of the 7th Congress, the last Congress before martial law.

In Cebu City, he started out as a city councilor in 1963, became the vice-mayor in 1967 and was elected to the House of Representatives representing the 2nd district the year after. He was the mayor of Toledo, Cebu from 2013 to 2019.

== Early life and education ==
Osmeña was born on January 17, 1935, in the then-municipality of Cebu to Dr. Emilio Veloso Osmeña and María Luisa Renner. He was the older brother of former Cebu governor Emilio Mario "Lito" Osmeña Jr. and Annabelle "Annie" Osmeña-Aboitiz, a real estate developer. His paternal grandfather was Sergio Osmeña, the fourth President of the Philippines.

Osmeña graduated with a degree in mechanical engineering from the University of San Carlos in Cebu City. He also went to the University of the Philippines and the International Social Development Institution in the Netherlands for further studies.

== Political career ==
Osmeña's career in politics began in 1963 when he was elected as a councilor of Cebu City. Five years later, in 1968, he was elected as the city's vice mayor and in 1969, was elected to the House of Representatives of the Philippines representing Cebu's 2nd district.

In 1970, he was named as one of the Ten Outstanding Young Men of the Philippines.

== Senator (1971–1972) and Martial Law years ==
Running for the Senate in 1971, Osmeña was at the August 21, 1971 miting de avance of the Liberal Party in Plaza Miranda, Quiapo, Manila where two grenades exploded killing 11 and leaving several people wounded. Both of Osmeña's legs were badly injured. He won a Senate seat in the 1971 election.

When President Ferdinand Marcos declared martial law on September 23, 1972, Osmeña went on exile in the United States. After the assassination of former Senator Benigno “Ninoy” Aquino on August 21, 1983, he was among the first political exiles to return to the country to help in the fight against the Marcos dictatorship.

== Second Term as Senator ==
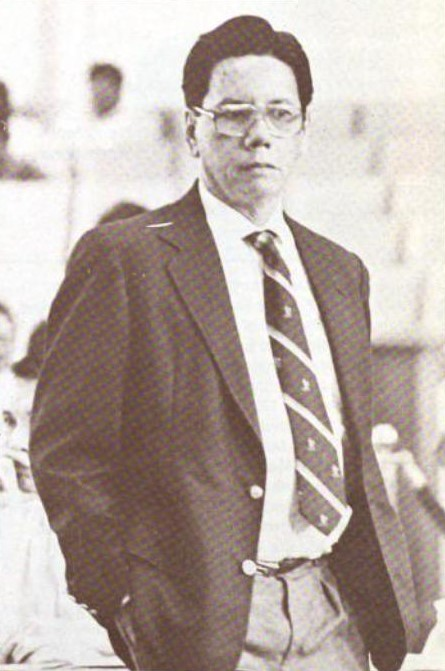
Osmeña as a senator, photograph released by the Philippine Congress, c. 1988

He was appointed officer-in-charge of Cebu City after the 1986 People Power Revolution. He was again elected a senator in 1987 under the Lakas ng Bayan Coalition of President Corazon Aquino.

== 1992 vice presidential election and Third Term as Senator ==
In 1992, he ran for vice president under the Nationalist People's Coalition with businessman Eduardo Cojuangco Jr. as his running mate. He soon withdrew his candidacy and was replaced by Senator Joseph Estrada. He instead sought re-election as senator, and was elected for a three-year term.

== Member of the House of Representatives and Fourth Term as Senator ==
He became the representative of the 3rd district of Cebu in 1995 before being elected as senator again in 1998. During this time, Osmeña gained the moniker, "The Lone Ranger". In 2001, during the impeachment trial of Joseph Estrada, he voted to prevent the presentation of an envelope believed to contain evidence that proves Estrada received bribe money.

Osmeña ran and lost for senatorial re-election in 2004 and 2007. In 2004, Osmeña sued Governor Gwen Garcia for plunder. Osmeña ran for mayor of Cebu City in the 2010 Cebu City local elections but lost. He was elected as mayor of Toledo, Cebu, and served from 2013 to 2019. After that, he sought to represent Cebu's 3rd congressional district, but was defeated in 2019.

=== Laws authored ===
Osmeña sponsored bills like The Municipal Telephone Act (Republic Act 6849) whereby each municipality will receive a telephone system; The Mini-Hydroelectric Program (RA 7156), which will provide non-conventional electricity in the countryside; The Public Telecommunications Act of 1995 (RA 7925), and the creation of the Philippine Postal Corporation (RA 7354). He also authored landmark bills like The Electric Power Crisis Act (RA 7648) and The Build-to-Operate Act (RA 7718).

Osmeña authored the law that created the Department of Energy.

Four bills were incorporated in Republic Act 9136 or otherwise known as The Electric Power Industry Reform Act of 2000:

- Senate Bill 1712 – Creation of National Transmission Company
- Senate Bill 1621 – Amending Section 5 of RA 7638 or the Department of Energy Law
- Senate Bill 1943 – Amending Certain Provisions of EO 172 or the Energy Regulatory Board as Amended by RA 8479
- Senate Bill 2000 – An Act to Modernize and Reform the Power Industry.

== Personal life ==
Osmeña was married to (and later separated from) Lucy Miller (née Urgello) in 1969. They only had one child, John Gregory "John-John" Osmeña, a former Cebu vice governor and provincial board member. One of Osmeña's grandsons is named John Henry Gregory Osmeña.

In 2004, Osmeña was charged with sexual abuse of a young boy, for which the Department of Justice cleared him because "there is no probable cause to indict respondent with the offense charged."

== Illness and death ==
In July 2020, it was announced that Osmeña had recovered from COVID-19 during the COVID-19 pandemic in the Philippines after 20 days of fighting the disease. He was once again hospitalized from January 9 to 16, 2021. Osmeña died on February 2, 2021, sixteen days after his 86th birthday, at his unit at Maryville Condominiums in Cebu City from post-COVID-19 complications. His remains were cremated and later inurned on the next day at Skyline Garden Columbary in Cebu City after his funeral that lasted less than an hour. A hybrid necrological service for him was held at the Senate's session hall in Pasay on March 4, 2021.
