= Toledo, Cebu =

Component city in Cebu, Philippines

Toledo
- Component city
- City of Toledo
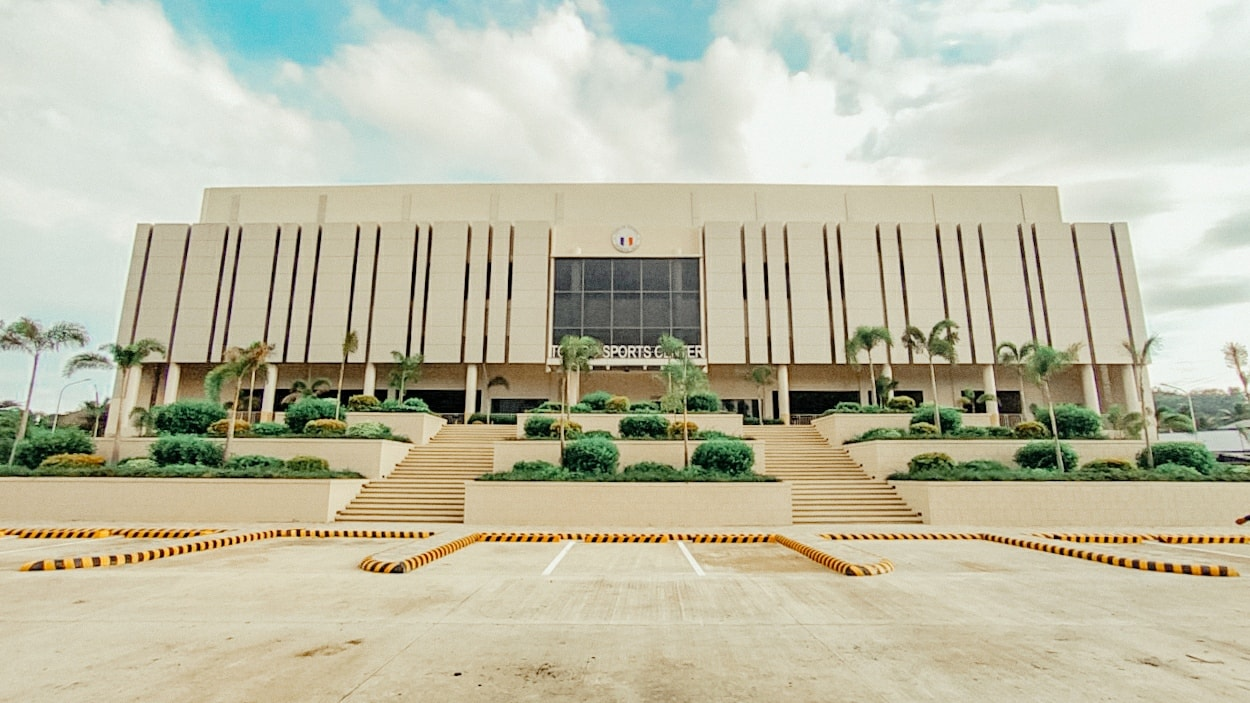
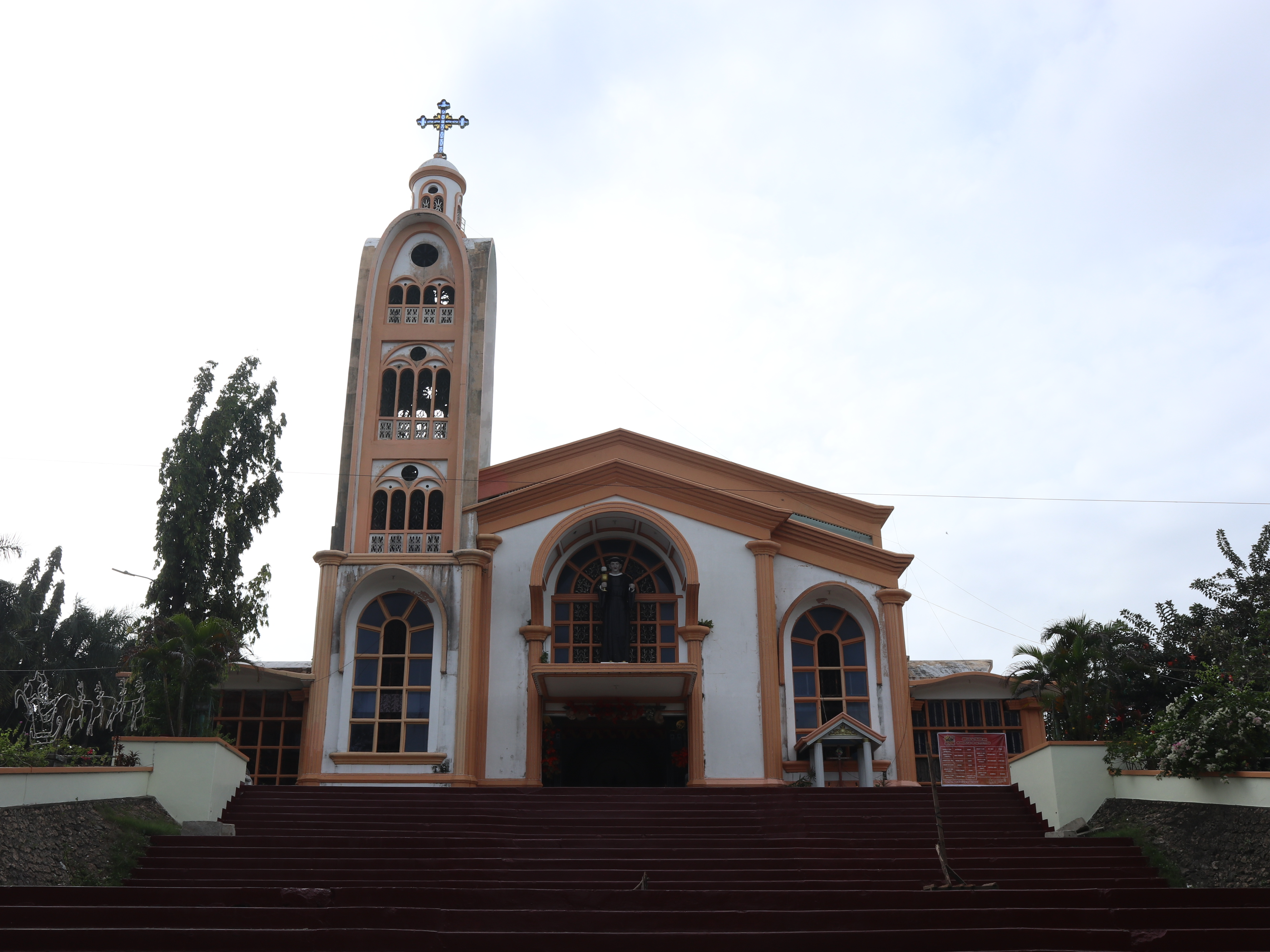
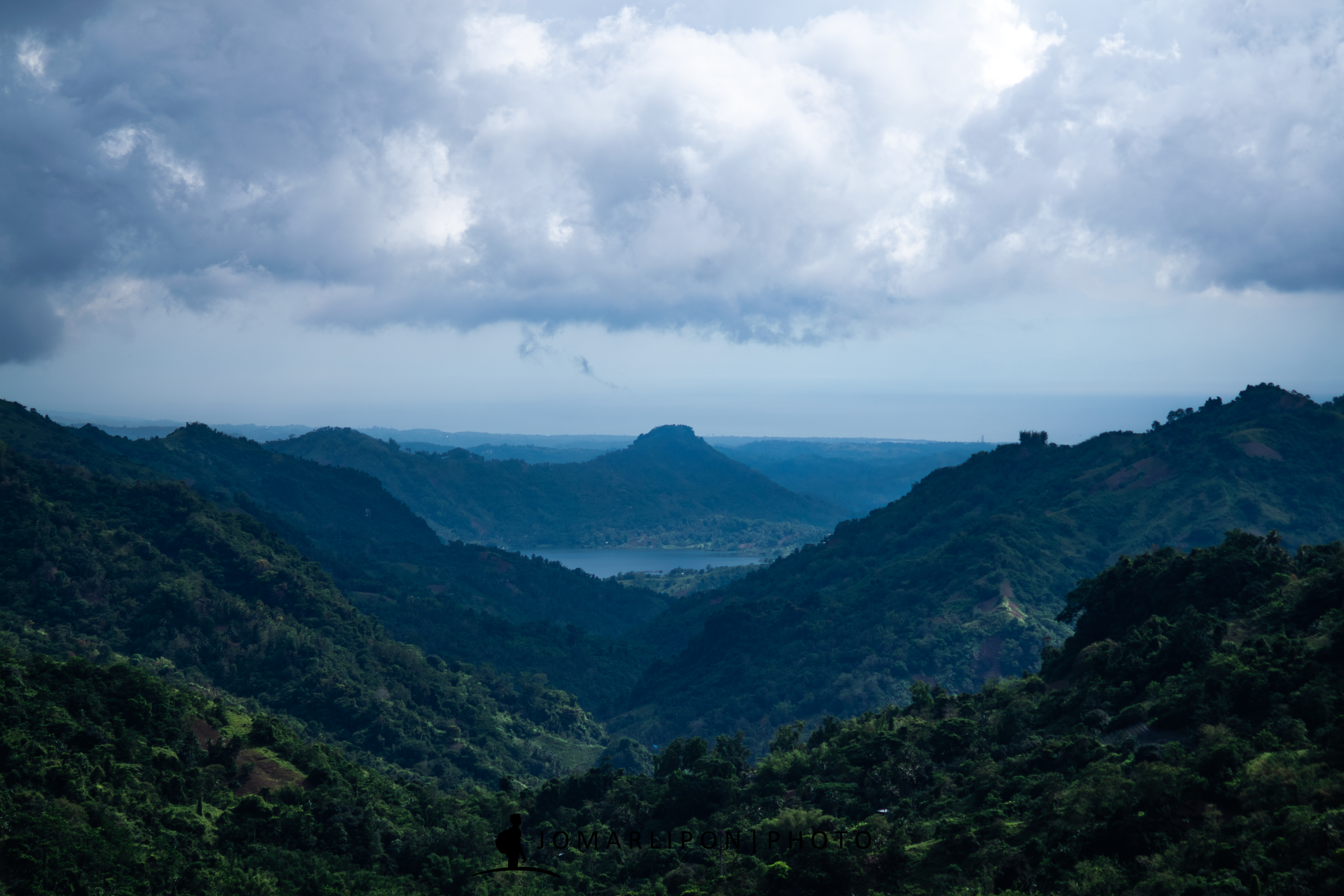
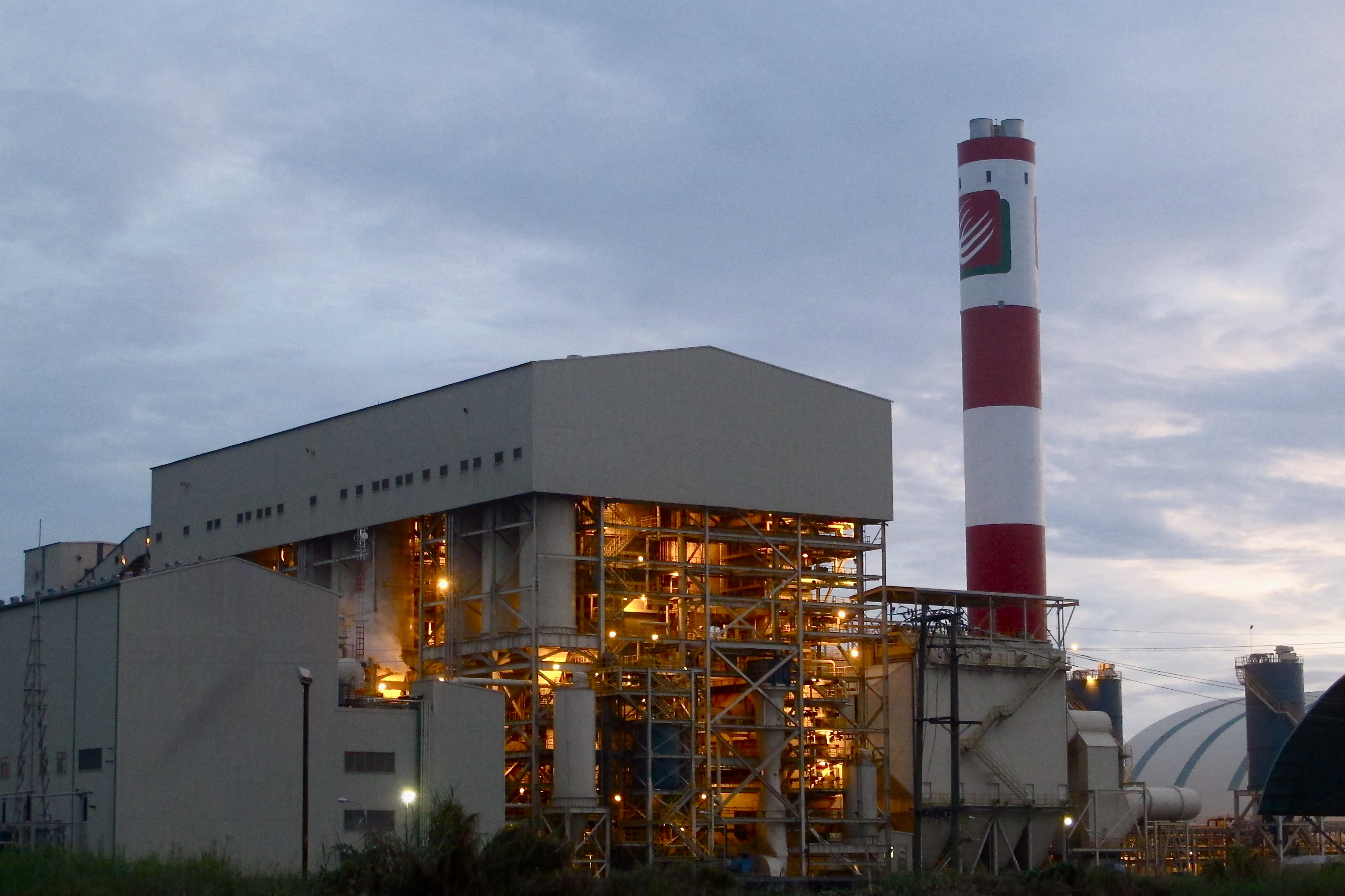
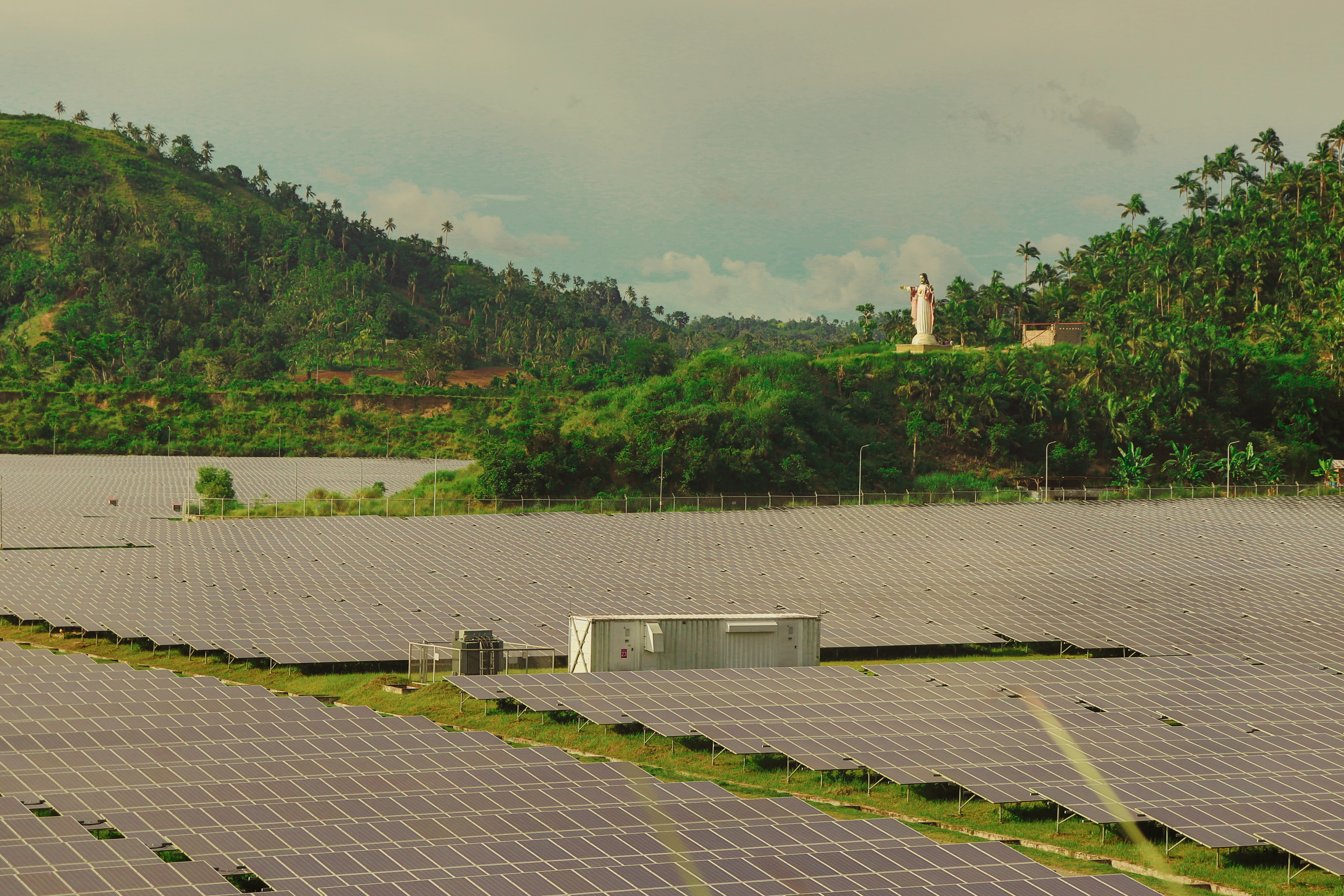
- Left to right, from the top: Toledo City Sports Center, San Juan de Sahagun Parish - Archdiocesan Shrine, View of Malubog Lake, Toledo Power Company, and Toledo City Solar Farm.

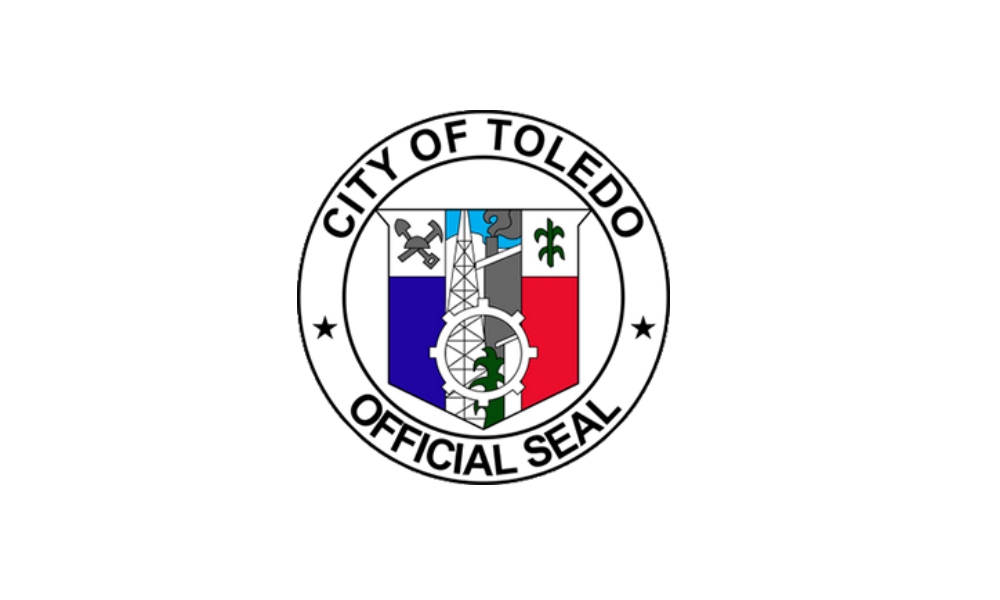
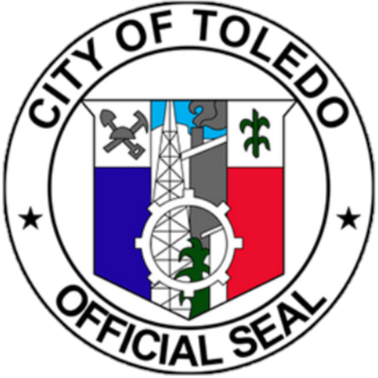
- Flag Seal
- Nickname: The Copper City with the Heart of Gold
- Anthem: Toledo City In My Heart
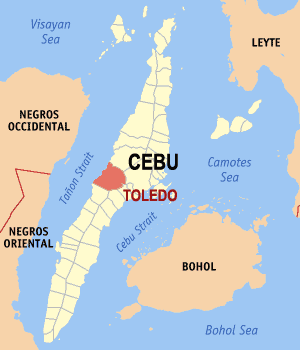
- Map of Cebu with Toledo highlighted
- Interactive map of Toledo
- Location within the Philippines
- Coordinates: 10°23′N 123°39′E
- Country: Philippines
- Region: Central Visayas
- Province: Cebu
- District: 3rd district
- Founded: 1861
- Cityhood: June 19, 1960
- Barangays: 38 (see Barangays)

Government
  - Type: Sangguniang Panlungsod
  - Mayor: Marjorie P. Perales (1Cebu)
  - Vice Mayor: Jay B. Sigue (1Cebu)
  - Representative: Pablo John F. Garcia
  - City Council: Members: Amuerfino A. Perales; Ricardo D. Pepito; James Y. Gaite; Mark Eric G. Espinosa; Pinky P. Espinosa; Ophelio L. Dolino; Anecito C. Alferez
  - Electorate: 129,196 voters (2025)

Area
  - Total: 216.28 km^{2} (83.51 sq mi)
- Elevation: 109 m (358 ft)
- Highest elevation: 981 m (3,219 ft)
- Lowest elevation: 0 m (0 ft)

Population (2024 census)
  - Total: 206,692
  - Density: 955.67/km^{2} (2,475.2/sq mi)
  - Households: 48,813

Economy
  - Income class: 1st city income class
  - Poverty incidence: 25.82% (2023)
  - Revenue: ₱ 2,198 million (2022)
  - Assets: ₱ 6,960 million (2022)
  - Expenditure: ₱ 1,789 million (2022)
  - Liabilities: ₱ 1,810 million (2022)

Service provider
  - Electricity: Cebu 3 Electric Cooperative (CEBECO 3)
- Time zone: UTC+8 (PST)
- ZIP code: 6038
- PSGC: 072251000
- IDD : area code: +63 (0)32
- Native languages: Cebuano; Tagalog
- Notable Festival: Hinulawan Festival-every June 12
- Patron saint: John of Sahagun
- Named after: Toledo, Spain
- Website: toledocity.gov.ph

Toledo (/təˈlɛdoʊ/ tə-LED-oh), officially the City of Toledo (Cebuano: Dakbayan sa Toledo; Filipino: Lungsod ng Toledo), is a component city in the province of Cebu, Philippines. According to the 2024 census, it has a population of 206,692 people.

On June 18, 1960, Toledo became a chartered city under Republic Act No. 2688.

Its patron saint is John of Sahagun and his feast day is celebrated every June 12.

It is widely known for its huge mining industry owned by Atlas Consolidated Mining and Development Corporation, which is the umbrella of Carmen Copper Corporation and its Toledo Mine.

== History ==
=== Founders of Hinulawan ===
Toledo City came from Old Hinulawan and New Hinulawan. Old Hinulawan, presently called Daanglungsod, was founded by Mariano Libre, Fulgencio Lebumfacil, Areston Macapaz, Adriano Blanco, and Tranquilino Blanco.

New Hinulawan, presently called Toledo (on the present site), was founded by Fermin Poloyapoy, Máximo Macapobre, Jacinto López, Jestoni Estrada, Servando de Jesus, Juan Libre, Agapito Nieves, Francisco Blanco, Geresola, Compra, Amaquin, Paraba, Concina, Camoro, Laspoña, and Sñr. Noel Dayot

=== Destruction of Old Hinulawan ===
On June 3, 1863 a series of earthquakes shook Hinulawan. The first tremor toppled the newly built school, leveled several houses to the ground, and caused the church facade to collapse. It caused injuries and death to several residents from falling debris.

The quake that followed brought greater damage: complete destruction of the church and the convent; cracking of the lowlands in all directions; crumbling of the stonewalls along the Hinulawan river bank; and sagging of the ground, causing water from the sea and the river to rush in and flood the settlement to waist level.

A third temblor totally destroyed Pueblo Hinulawan.

The survivors were rescued by residents of neighboring highland localities.

=== New Hinulawan ===
The survivors of the Hinulawan earthquakes gradually rebuilt their lives in the aftermath of the disaster. With assistance from residents of Barangay Tubod, some cleared sections of the surrounding forest and plateau and constructed homes with roofs made of cogon grass. Others who chose not to settle in the newly cleared areas built their houses at the foot of the Tubod highlands. The community also established a burial ground on a portion of the plateau, where they laid their dead to rest not far from their new settlements.

The area occupied by this particular group, a majority of the survivors, subsequently evolved into the New Hinulawan.

A minority of the refugees decided to migrate to other places: the hinterlands of Da-o, Bulok-bulok, Landahan, and Sam-ang as well as the pioneering settlements in the seafronts of Cabito-onan and Batohanon.

In those days pirate attacks against pueblos situated near the shores of Tañon Strait were rampant. To protect themselves against such attacks, the residents of New Hinulawan built a baluarte, or bulwark, made of chopped stone blocks piled along the shoreline. With the passage of time, however, the bulwark became dilapidated and fell apart, its remnants forever buried in the sand during the construction of the first municipio, or Municipal Hall building. The municipio itself was destroyed by Philippine Commonwealth troops and Cebuano guerrillas in World War II.

Many years later, a few among those who resettled in New Hinulawan decided to return to their former homes in Old Hinulawan when the depressed lowlands gradually became habitable. Old Hinulawan is the present-day Barangay Daanglungsod.

The majority who opted to remain in New Hinulawan worked hard to regain the prosperity they had achieved before Old Hinulawan was wiped out by catastrophe.

=== Pueblo Toledo ===
Two significant events happened in mid-1869 which led to the change of name of New Hinulawan:

Carlos María de la Torre (1869-1872) became the new Spanish Governor-general of the Philippines. Father Mariano Brazal (1869-1876), who championed the Filipinization of parishes, assumed the duties as parish priest of New Hinulawan, replacing Father Servando Seoane who was transferred to another parish. Fr. Brazal and the new Governor-general were proponents of political liberalism which was on the rise in Spain during that period following the fall of Queen Isabel II.

Meanwhile, the alcalde mayor of Cebu (equivalent to the modern-day Cebu Provincial Governor), Esteban Perez, was the boyhood friend of governor-general De la Torre in their hometown Toledo, Spain. Perez was married to a Philippine woman and used to spend his vacation with his family in Talavera, a part of New Hinulawan, where he owned a beach resort. He and Fr. Brazal were also good friends.

A welcome banquet was given in the governor-general's palace in Manila in the evening of July 12, 1869 which was attended by students, priests, and Filipino leaders to express their gratitude to De la Torre's liberal policies.

During the occasion, Carlos María de la Torre and Esteban Perez reminisced about their boyhood days in Spain in the presence of Fr. Mariano Brazal. In the course of their recollections, Perez spoke to the governor-general about New Hinulawan, expressing his fondness for the place, particularly because his Filipina wife was a native of Talavera, a barangay of New Hinulawan. He also remarked on the similarities between the environment of New Hinulawan and their homeland of Toledo, Spain, noting that the winding Hinulawan River was comparable to the Tagus River (*Río Tajo*) in Spain.

That evening Perez and Fr. Brazal recommended to the governor-general that the name of New Hinulawan be changed to Toledo.

Governor-general De la Torre delightfully approved the recommendation at once. He even announced to all people present in the banquet the promulgation of a decree changing the name of pueblo New Hinulawan in the province of Cebu into pueblo Toledo, the name of his beloved birthplace in Spain.

=== Second World War ===
In 1942 the Japanese Imperial forces captured and occupied the town of Toledo.

In 1945, local Filipino forces of the Philippine Commonwealth Army from the 8th, 82nd, 83rd, 85th and 86th Infantry Division aided by Cebuano guerrilla resistance fighters, battled against the Japanese Imperial forces and liberated the town of Toledo.

=== Cityhood ===
On June 19, 1960, Toledo became a chartered city under Republic Act No. 2688. It was made into a city through the efforts of then Congressman Manuel A. Zosa, representative of the old Sixth District Cebu, who authored Republic Act No. 2688.

Although not as progressive as Cebu's other cities, it is unique in that it is the only city in the province on the western seaboard facing Negros Oriental – and therefore strategically located. (Danao, Mandaue, Lapu-Lapu, Cebu City, Talisay, Naga, and Carcar are on the east. One more city, Bogo, is in the north, on the eastern side.)

=== Shrine of Saint Pedro Calungsod ===
Following the canonization on October 21, 2012, of Visayan teen martyr Pedro Calungsod (1672), the hilltop parish of Cantabaco became the first shrine and church named after the second Filipino saint.

== Geography ==
Toledo City is bordered to the north by the town of Balamban, to the west is the Tañon Strait, to the east is Cebu City and Naga and the town of Minglanilla, and to the south is the town of Pinamungajan. It is 67 kilometres (42 mi) from Cebu City, 37 kilometres (23 mi) from Talisay, and 35 kilometres (22 mi) from Naga.

=== Malubog Lake ===
Toledo has been the source of water for Metro Cebu, Cebu City Water District. It uses Vacuum Type Water Systems, the Pipes from this lake go up the mountain and go down to Cebu Proper, Malubog Lake is situated and located more higher than Cebu City Proper.

=== Barangays ===
It is composed of thirty-eight (38) barangays, ten (10) of which are urban and twenty-eight (28) are rural barangays. Each barangay consists of puroks and some have sitios.

PSGC	Barangay	Population			±% p.a.	
		2024		2010		
072251001	Awihao	2.0%	4,207	3,823	▴	0.66%
072251002	Bagakay	1.2%	2,485	1,690	▴	2.70%
072251003	Bato	4.0%	8,173	7,585	▴	0.52%
072251004	Biga	1.6%	3,327	2,076	▴	3.31%
072251005	Bulongan	1.3%	2,647	2,359	▴	0.80%
072251006	Bunga	1.9%	3,868	3,409	▴	0.88%
072251007	Cabitoonan	2.0%	4,154	3,782	▴	0.65%
072251008	Calongcalong	0.7%	1,535	1,327	▴	1.01%
072251009	Cambang‑ug	1.8%	3,668	3,537	▴	0.25%
072251010	Camp 8	1.2%	2,529	1,776	▴	2.47%
072251011	Canlumampao	2.0%	4,170	3,523	▴	1.17%
072251012	Cantabaco	3.5%	7,304	6,638	▴	0.66%
072251013	Capitan Claudio	2.1%	4,311	3,877	▴	0.73%
072251014	Carmen	1.9%	3,858	3,505	▴	0.66%
072251015	Daanglungsod	1.4%	2,933	2,802	▴	0.32%
072251016	Don Andres Soriano (Lutopan)	6.2%	12,764	15,333	▾	−1.26%
072251017	Dumlog	2.6%	5,288	4,155	▴	1.68%
072251024	Gen. Climaco (Malubog)	3.1%	6,337	5,521	▴	0.96%
072251018	Ibo	1.8%	3,699	3,602	▴	0.18%
072251019	Ilihan	1.6%	3,206	3,344	▾	−0.29%
072251023	Juan Climaco, Sr. (Magdugo)	3.0%	6,279	5,568	▴	0.83%
072251020	Landahan	1.1%	2,183	1,810	▴	1.30%
072251021	Loay	0.7%	1,501	1,452	▴	0.23%
072251022	Luray II	2.2%	4,640	4,391	▴	0.38%
072251025	Matab‑ang	4.8%	9,868	9,124	▴	0.54%
072251026	Media Once	3.4%	7,128	6,477	▴	0.66%
072251027	Pangamihan	1.1%	2,333	1,653	▴	2.41%
072251028	Poblacion	6.5%	13,383	13,492	▾	−0.06%
072251029	Poog	2.9%	5,989	5,665	▴	0.38%
072251030	Putingbato	0.7%	1,413	1,448	▾	−0.17%
072251031	Sagay	0.6%	1,145	1,605	▾	−2.30%
072251032	Sam‑ang	0.8%	1,719	1,649	▴	0.29%
072251033	Sangi	2.0%	4,201	3,835	▴	0.63%
072251034	Santo Niño (Mainggit)	2.6%	5,316	4,320	▴	1.44%
072251035	Subayon	0.7%	1,432	1,153	▴	1.51%
072251036	Talavera	2.9%	6,041	4,972	▴	1.35%
072251038	Tubod	2.0%	4,128	3,329	▴	1.50%
072251037	Tungkay	0.6%	1,173	1,471	▾	−1.55%
	Total		206,692	157,078	▴	1.91%

=== Climate ===
Climate data for Toledo City, Cebu
Month	Jan	Feb	Mar	Apr	May	Jun	Jul	Aug	Sep	Oct	Nov	Dec	Year
Mean daily maximum °C (°F)	28 (82)	29 (84)	30 (86)	31 (88)	31 (88)	30 (86)	30 (86)	30 (86)	30 (86)	29 (84)	29 (84)	28 (82)	30 (85)
Mean daily minimum °C (°F)	23 (73)	23 (73)	23 (73)	24 (75)	25 (77)	25 (77)	25 (77)	25 (77)	25 (77)	25 (77)	24 (75)	23 (73)	24 (75)
Average precipitation mm (inches)	70 (2.8)	49 (1.9)	62 (2.4)	78 (3.1)	138 (5.4)	201 (7.9)	192 (7.6)	185 (7.3)	192 (7.6)	205 (8.1)	156 (6.1)	111 (4.4)	1,639 (64.6)
Average rainy days	13.4	10.6	13.1	14.5	24.2	27.9	28.4	27.7	27.1	27.4	22.5	15.9	252.7
Source: Meteoblue

== Demographics ==
Population census of Toledo
Year	Pop.	±% p.a.
1903	12,929	—
1918	25,244	+4.56%
1939	34,413	+1.49%
1948	39,225	+1.46%
1960	63,881	+4.15%
1970	67,727	+0.59%
1975	76,521	+2.48%
1980	91,668	+3.68%
1990	119,970	+2.73%
1995	121,469	+0.23%
2000	141,174	+3.28%
2007	152,960	+1.11%
2010	157,078	+0.97%
2015	170,335	+1.56%
2020	207,314	+4.22%
2024	206,692	−0.07%
Source: Philippine Statistics Authority

== Economy ==
Poverty incidence of Toledo (%)

Source: Philippine Statistics Authority

Toledo City is known as the "Copper City". Carmen Copper Corporation a subsidiary of Atlas Consolidated Mining and Development Corporation operates the Toledo Copper mine covering 1,674 hectares. The mine is located in Barangay Don Andres Soriano (Lutopan), Toledo City. The copper concentrate are shipped and delivered mainly to smelting factories in China, India and Japan.

Aside from mining, Toledo City is also known as the "Power City" as a handful of power providers are located in the city. Global Business Power Corporation (GBP) is a holding company that has become the leading energy provider in the Visayas region. It owns Toledo Power Co. (TPC) which owns a 60 MW and 82 MW coal-fired power plants in Barangay Daanlungsod and a 40 MW diesel plant in Carmen; and Cebu Energy Development Corporation (CEDC), a 246 MW clean coal-fired power plant utilizing Circulating Fluidized Bed (CFB) boiler technology also located in Barangay Daanlungsod. Another coal-fired power plant is AboitizPower subsidiary Therma Visayas, Inc.(TVI) which has a net capacity of 300 MW located in Bato, Toledo City. Aside from coal-fired power plants, a 60 MW solar power plant is located in a 73-hectare property in Barangay Talavera owned by First Toledo Solar Energy Corporation a subsidiary of Citicore Power Inc. a community-focused renewable energy company. The National Grid Corporation (NGCP) currently has two substations in Toledo City located in Barangay Calong-calong and Magdugo.

Other companies in Toledo City include Atlas Fertilizer Corporation and San-Vic Agro-Builders, Inc. to name a few.

Shopping malls are also present in Toledo like Gaisano Grand, Gaisano Metro and Prince Warehouse Club.

== Education ==
The Toledo City Science High School (Filipino: Mataas na Paaralang Pang-Agham ng Toledo), also known as TCSHS, is a public science high school in Ilihan Heights, Toledo, Cebu, Philippines. It is a DepEd-recognized science high school. It was founded in 1996.

== Tourism ==
The barangays of Cantabaco and Poog have limestone cliffs that local climbers have developed into popular crags for sport climbing.

== Gallery ==
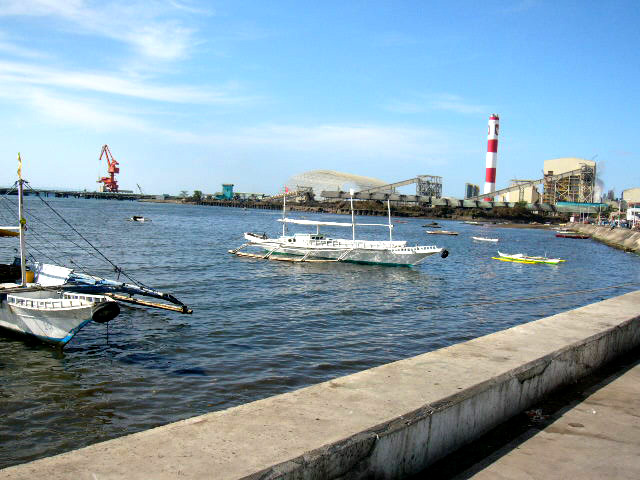
Tañon Strait viewed from Toledo City Boulevard

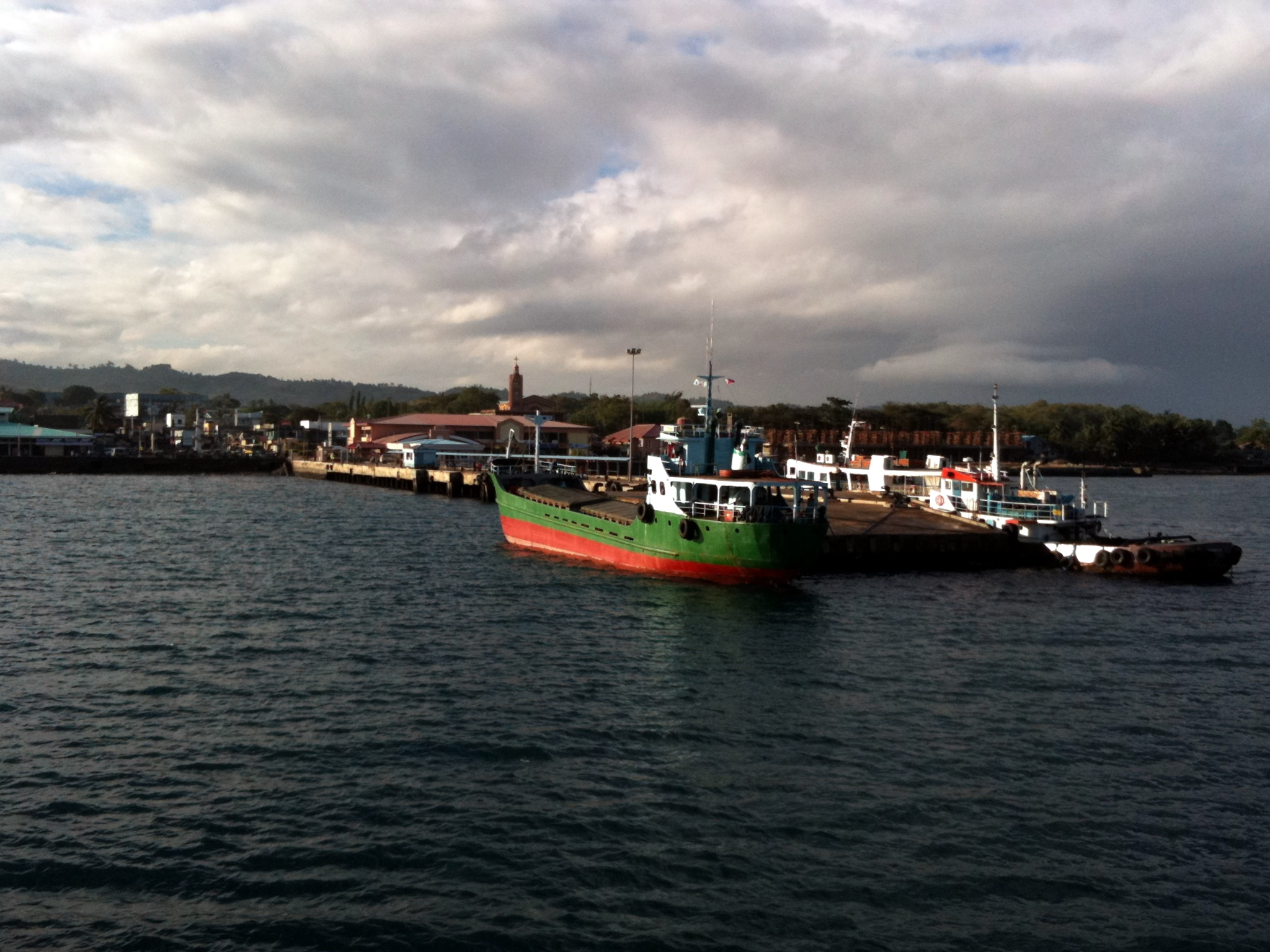
Harbour of Toledo

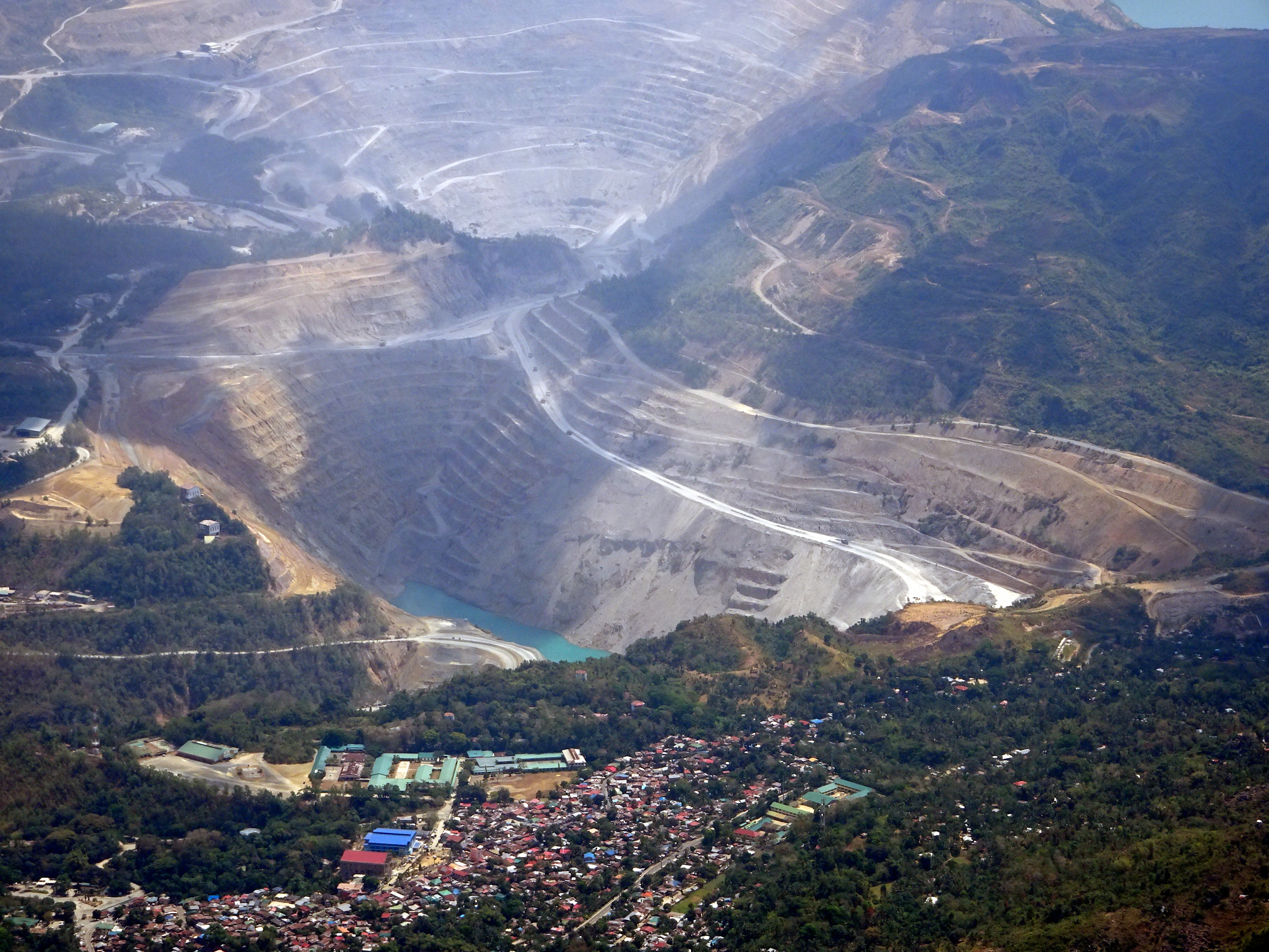
Toledo Mine

== Notable people ==
- Anna Fegi - actress, singer; former member band of Smokey Mountain.
- Máximo Macapobre was a 19th-century Philippines leader and activist.
- Juan Clímaco was the second governor of Cebu, Philippines, the first governor to be elected to the position, and a Cebu revolutionary during the Philippine-American war.
- Gisele Shaw - professional wrestler.
- Jay-R Siaboc – actor, singer and Season 1 finalist of Pinoy Dream Academy.

== Sources ==
- Philippine Star, Vanessa Balbuena (October 14, 2012). "Special feature :In honor of Blessed Pedro". Archived from the original on March 21, 2017.
