= Government Service Insurance System =

Pension fund for Philippine civil servants

- Native name: Paseguruhan ng mga Naglilingkod sa Pamahalaan
- Type: Government-owned and controlled corporation (GOCC)
- Industry: Insurance
- Founded: November 14, 1936; 89 years ago
- Founder: Commonwealth of the Philippines
- Headquarters: GSIS Building, Financial Center, Diokno Boulevard, Pasay, Philippines
- Key people: Rodolfo G. Del Rosario, Jr. (Chairperson); Jose Arnulfo A. Veloso (President and General Manager)
- Services: Government employee insurance
- Revenue: ₱311.3 billion (2023)
- Net income: ₱113.3 billion (2023)
- Total assets: ₱1.7 trillion (2023)
- Total equity: ₱606.5 billion (2020)
- Website: www.gsis.gov.ph

The Government Service Insurance System (GSIS; Filipino: Paseguruhan ng mga Naglilingkod sa Pamahalaan) is a government-owned and controlled corporation (GOCC) in the Philippines that provides social insurance coverage to government employees. Established under Commonwealth Act No. 186 and governed by Republic Act No. 8291 (the GSIS Act of 1997), the GSIS provides a defined-benefit social insurance scheme. It insures its members against specific contingencies in exchange for monthly premium contributions.

GSIS members are entitled to various social security benefits, including life insurance, separation and retirement benefits, and disability benefits.

The GSIS also administers the General Insurance Fund under Republic Act No. 656 (the Property Insurance Law), providing insurance coverage for government assets and properties in which the government has insurable interests.

Personnel customarily working for &/or under the government but engaged under contract of service (CoS) or job order (JO) arrangements are excluded from GSIS membership because these kinds of engagement do not vest an "employer–employee relationship" between them and the government entity, as such they fall under the purview of the Social Security System (SSS). Government employees may also voluntarily enroll in the SSS at their own expense, in addition to their GSIS membership.

== Legislation ==
=== Coverage ===
The GSIS covers all government workers except:

- Members of the Judiciary and Constitutional Commissions who are covered by separate retirement laws;
- "Employees","consultants" but in reality, were engaged through the Contract of Service (CoS) / Job Order (JO) arrangement : such types of engagement do not vest an employer-employee relationship with the contracting government entity (unless perhaps favorably challenged in court, as in the cases of Lopez et. al vs MWSS (G.R. No. 154472 ) and National Service Corp. v. NLRC (G.R. No. L-69870) );
- Uniformed members of the Armed Forces of the Philippines and the Philippine National Police, including the Bureau of Jail Management and Penology and the Bureau of Fire Protection.

Does not include: Barangay and Sanggunian officials who are not receiving fixed monthly compensation (Source: RIRR)

=== Benefits and Services ===
The principal benefit package of the GSIS consists of compulsory and optional life insurance, retirement, separation and employee's compensation.

== Organization ==
The governing and policy-making body of the GSIS is the Board of Trustees, the members of which are appointed by the President of the Philippines.

The GSIS workforce consists of 3,104 employees, 52% of whom are in the Head Office while the remaining 48% are in the Branches. To date, the GSIS has 42 Branch Offices, 14 Extension Offices nationwide and 58 service desks.

== Old GSIS Headquarters Building ==
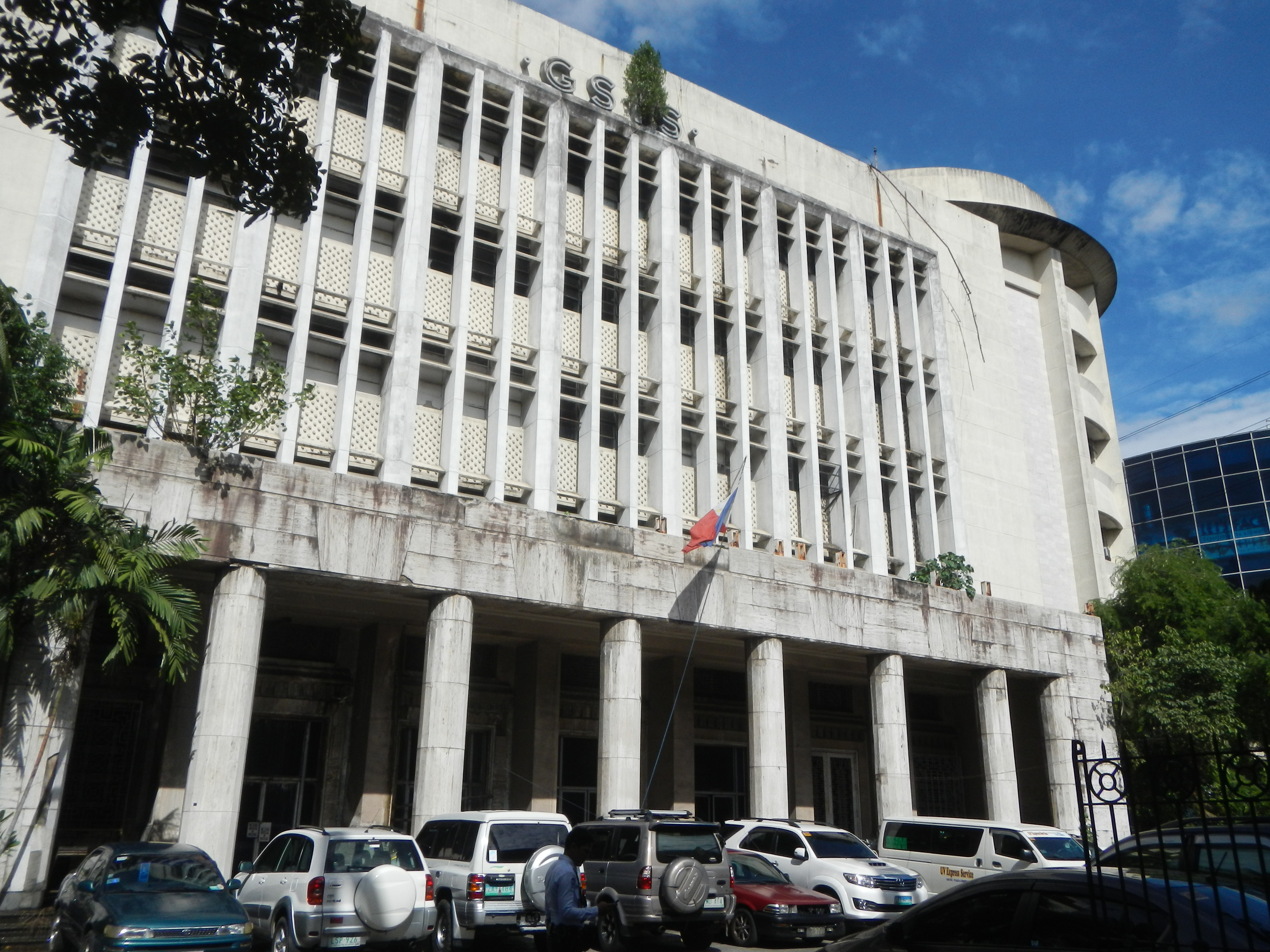
Old GSIS Building in Ermita

The Government Service Insurance System Building, built in 1952 in Arroceros (near SM Manila, the previous location of the YMCA Building) was one of the first of the new buildings programmed for the New Republic to be completed. Designed by Federico Ilustre, the structure's character stand at the intersection between neoclassical and modern aesthetics. As a transitional style for government architecture, its façade generated a series of ascending fluted pillars that had neither bases nor capitals to express a stripped and simplified modern style, yet, at the same time, it has the character of classical massings and proportions. The corner of the building had been rounded, forming a corner tower with three vertical bays of windows ascending from the entrance canopy. To the left of this corner tower, a flat wall was fenestrated with vertical louvers and pierced screen insets. The elevation in the other corner was defined by horizontal bands of windows and concrete planes.

The GSIS building used to house the main office of the then Ministry of Education, Culture and Sports, and of the Office of the Ombudsman. Some of its outer rooms currently house the office of city election officers and several branches of the metropolitan trial court.

This heritage building, right behind Manila City Hall, is being targeted for demolition, in violation of the law on heritage. The owners have been asked by Manila City Hall when they were going to demolish this Federico Ilustre landmark.

Coconut Manila had asked James Jao, the architect and London School of Economics-trained urban planner on the plan for rescuing the built heritage structure. "This building can be gentrified into a mixed-use development. By retaining the existing structure, it can be the podium of a high-rise building behind including an atrium... The existing GSIS Building can host upscale retail shops and some restaurants, with a lobby/reception on one side for the hotel or condominium (office or residential). This approach can complement the existing SM City mall. An underground walkway can connect both the GSIS and SM," he responded.

== Computerization ==
=== Database crash ===
On April 2 and May 11, 2009, the GSIS Integrated Loans, Membership, Acquired Assets and Accounts Management System (ILMAAAMS) went into a database crash, causing the agency to incur a backlog in its processing of claims and loan applications. The GSIS filed on June 1, 2011, a P100-million damage suit against the IBM Philippines and its parent firm, as well as contractor Questronix Corp. for supplying defective database software that led to the computer crash.

=== UMID ===
The GSIS was the first government agency in the Philippines to adopt the Unified Multi-Purpose ID System, "which aims to streamline and harmonize the identification systems of all government agencies and government-owned and controlled corporations through the use of a unified multi-purpose ID". On August 16, 2011, the GSIS announced that enrollment for the eCard has reached its one million mark.

== Investments ==
On January 25, 2008, GSIS President and General Manager Winston Garcia announced "that it will be investing a total of $5 billion in fixed income, equities and properties [in the Philippines] and abroad ... initially investing $1 billion this year in global markets, and another $1 billion locally".

On the third quarter of 2023, it stealthily acquired shares of the then would-be-delisting Metro Pacific Investments Corporation from the open market to eventually end up securing at most two board seats, having increased its stake to 12%.

== See also ==
- Social Security System (Philippines), for private employees and the self-employed (includes those de facto working for the government but not de jure - not having a [direct] "employer-employee relationship" such as through "Contract of Service (CoS)" and "Job Order (JO)" types of engagement)
