= Sugbuak =

Failed proposal to divide Cebu into four separate provinces

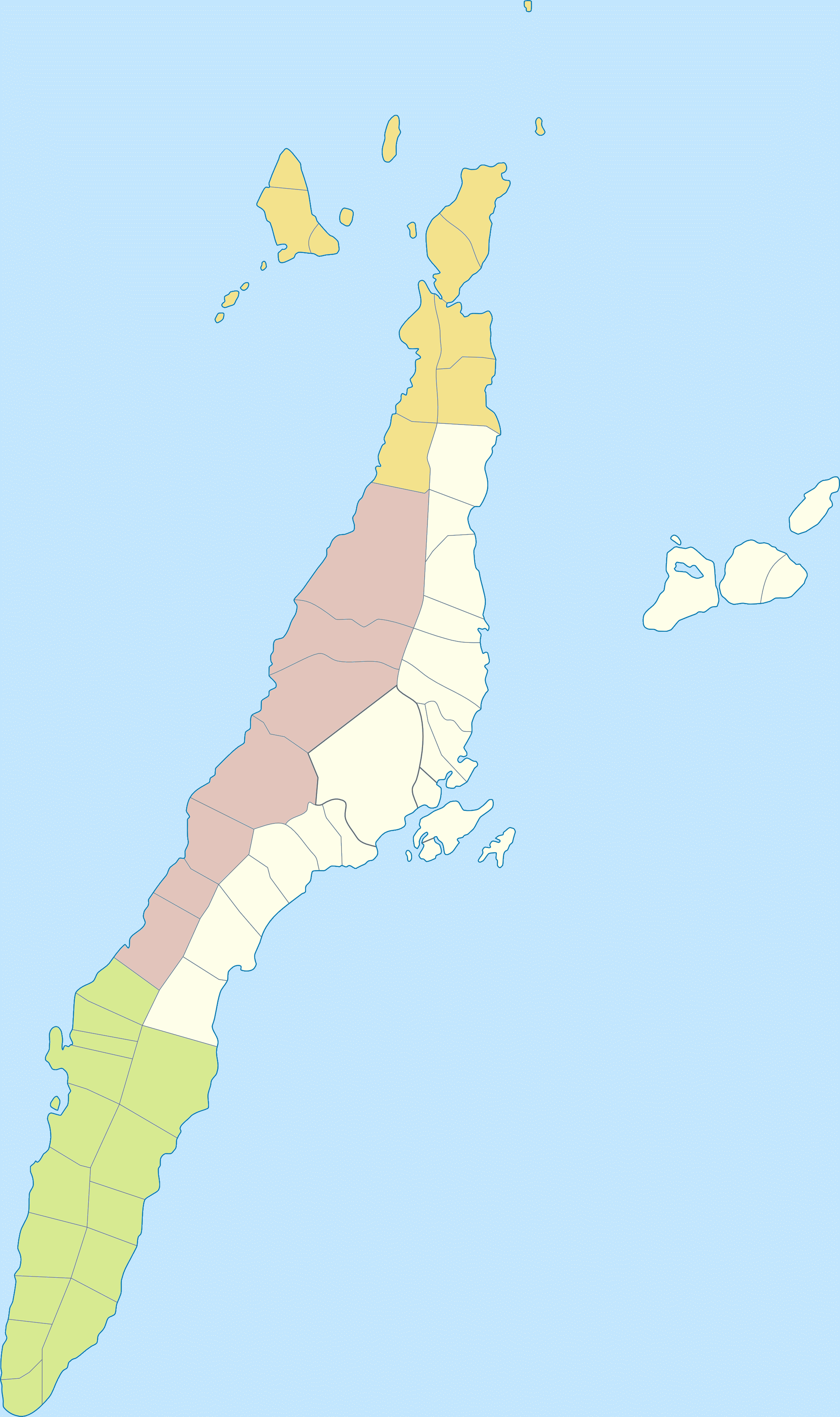
Map of showing the proposed new provinces within Cebu province as part of the Sugbuak proposal. Cebu del Norte Cebu Occidental Cebu del Sur the rest of Cebu

Sugbuak (portmanteau of Sugbu and buak) (Note: See § Etymology for its definition.) refers to the failed proposal to divide the island province of Cebu in the Philippines into four separate provinces in 2007. The issue, which had emerged before the 2007 general election, was a polarizing issue in provincial politics, pitting the anti-partition camp of Cebu Governor Gwendolyn Garcia, Cebu City Mayor Tomas Osmeña and Cebu City Representative Antonio Cuenco, against that of Sugbuak proponents Representatives Antonio Yapha Jr., Clavel Asas-Martinez, and Simeon Kintanar—all of whom were last-term congressmen at the time.

== Etymology ==
The term Sugbuak is a portmanteau of the Cebuano words Sugbo (the endonym for Cebu) and buak ('split' or 'break') and roughly translates to "the splitting of Cebu" or "Breaking Cebu". The more pro-partition term Sugbuhi is conversely a portmanteau of Sugbo and buhi ('life-giving'), roughly translating into "giving life to Cebu".

== History ==
The idea of a divided Cebu can be traced to 1967, when a proposal to split the island's lone congressional district into a new province failed. Gubernatorial candidates in that year's general election who supported the partition were defeated due to strong opposition from the Cebu electorate.

The actual Sugbuak began in February 2005, when Representatives Yapha, Asas-Martínez, and Kintanar filed three bills proposing that the fourth, second and third legislative districts of Cebu (which they held, respectively) be converted into three new provinces named Cebu del Norte, Cebu del Sur and Cebu Occidental. The remaining three districts of Cebu, in addition to the two legislative districts of Cebu City, would constitute a fourth province. The three provinces, according to their respective bills, would have their capitals in Bogo, Argao and Toledo.

According to the congressmen, the motive for the Sugbuak is to bring the government "closer to the people" and to allow the new provinces to get an increased share in the Internal Revenue Allotment, as well as to hasten the development of the districts, which were said to have been "neglected" by the provincial government.

=== Opposition ===
The filing of the bills triggered a massive campaign to keep Cebu united. The campaign led by Governor García claimed that the motive for the Sugbuak was more political than economic. An article published by The Manila Times claimed that the provinces would have become the "virtual fiefdoms" of Asas-Martínez, Kintanar and Yapha after the partition, an idea reinforced by the fact that all three congressmen were in their last terms as representatives of their respective districts. The provincial council of Cebu passed a resolution supporting the Sugbuak with a vote of 8–7; García, however, vetoed the resolution.

García's call for a united Cebu met with strong support from local governments, business interests, civil society groups, and even the Roman Catholic Church. In August 2005, the Archdiocese of Cebu conducted a survey in its 138 parishes to gauge the level of support for the Sugbuak. 71 parishes, including those of proposed capitals Argao, Bogo, and Toledo City, confirmed the belief of Cardinal Ricardo Vidal, Archbishop of Cebu, that a majority of Cebuanos opposed the Sugbuak.

== See also ==
- 2008 Quezon del Sur creation plebiscite, a plebiscite that rejected the proposed division of Quezon into two smaller provinces
- 2021 Palawan division plebiscite, a plebiscite that rejected the proposed division of Palawan into three smaller provinces
