= Casuntingan =

Casuntingan may refer to any of the following places in the Philippines:

- Casuntingan, a barangay in the city of Mandaue
- Casuntingan, a barangay in the municipality of MacArthur, Leyte
