= Mandaue Church =

Roman Catholic church in Mandaue, Philippines

- National Shrine of Saint Joseph
- Nasudnong Alampoanan ug Parokya ni San Jose (Cebuano)
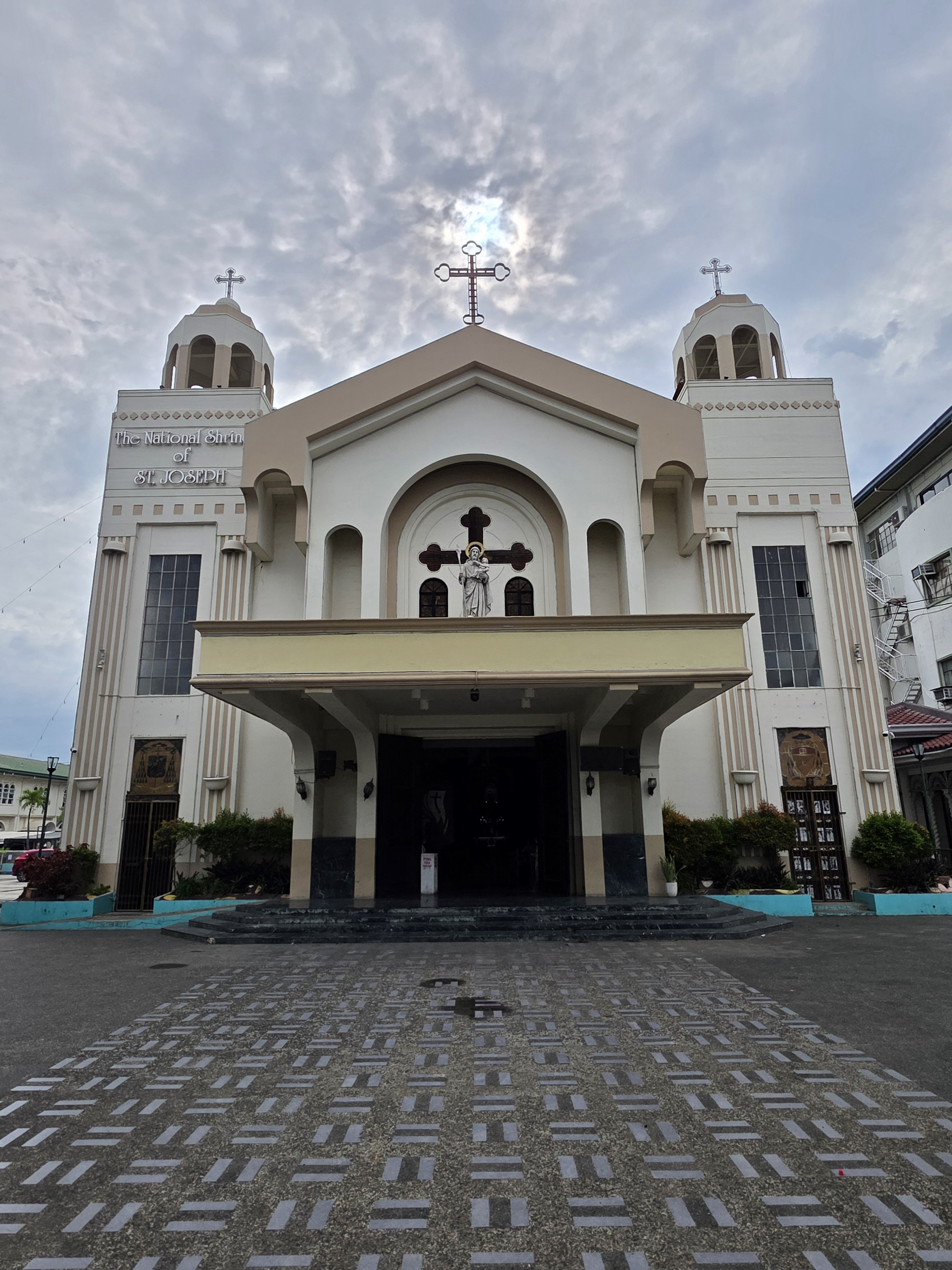
- Church facade in July 2026

- Location in Metro Cebu Location in Cebu Location in the Visayas Location in the Philippines
- 10°19′39″N 123°56′32″E
- Location: S.B. Cabahug Street, Barangay Centro, Mandaue City, Philippines
- Country: Philippines
- Denomination: Roman Catholic

History
- Status: National shrine; Parish church

Architecture
- Functional status: Active
- Architectural type: Church building
- Style: Neo Greco-Roman, Baroque

Administration
- Archdiocese: Cebu

Clergy
- Priest(s): Roger Fuentes (team moderator); Ian Fel Balangkig (team member); Jimmy Tolentin (team member); Joel Orriesga

The National Shrine of Saint Joseph, commonly known as Mandaue Church, is a Roman Catholic parish church located at the center of Mandaue City, Philippines. It is under the jurisdiction of the Archdiocese of Cebu; its parish jurisdiction covers the civil barangays of Guizo, Centro, Looc, Cambaro and Mantuyong.

Its present rector and moderator of the team of pastors is Msgr. Roger Fuents, who assumed the post in 2025 after the Major reshuffliing of Priest in the whole Archdiocese of Cebu.

== History ==
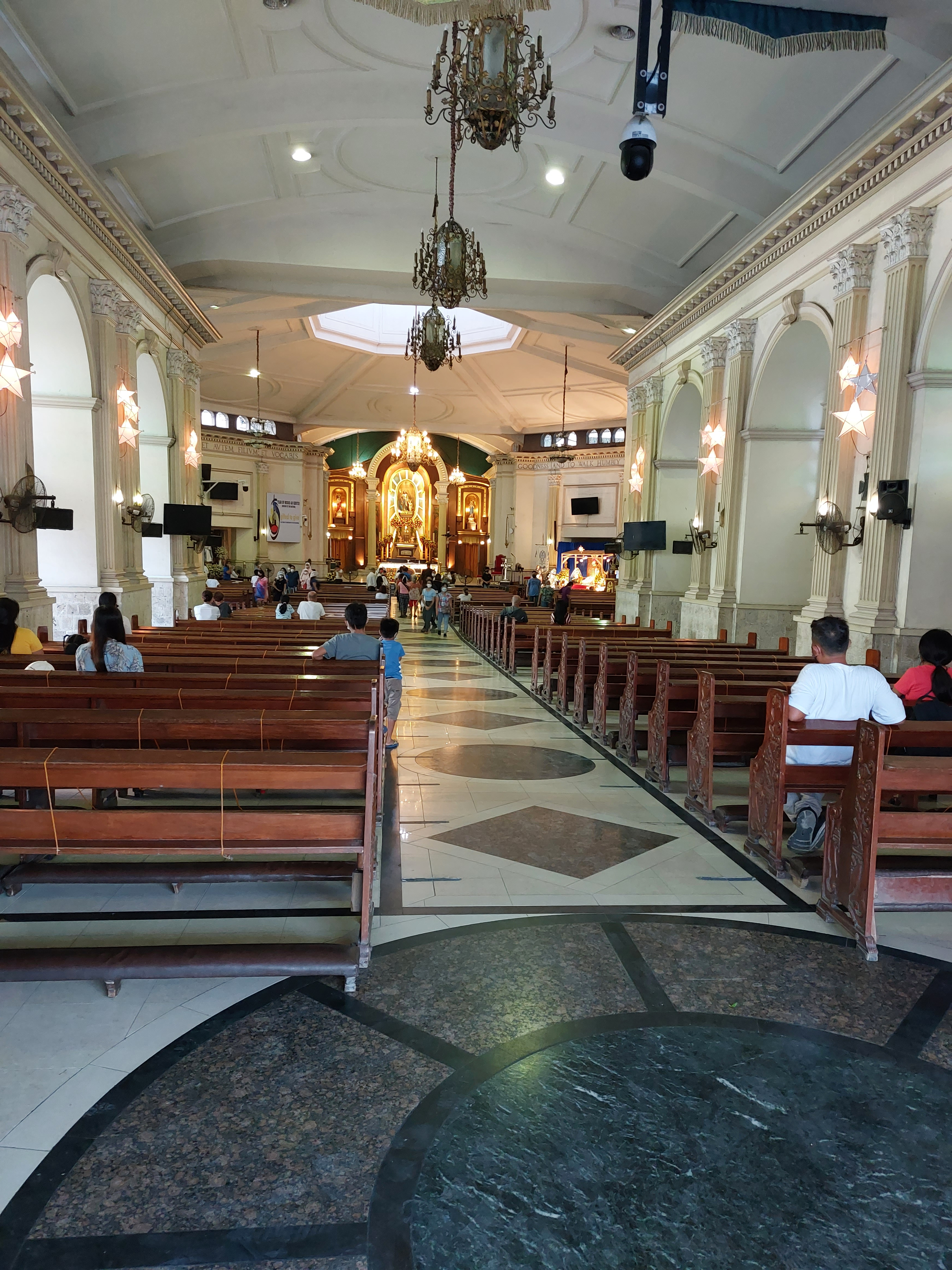
Church interior in 2022

The Jesuits established Mandaue in 1638 as a mission after they had acquired lands in the area for the Colegio de San Ildefonso. They exchanged Mandaue for Parian in Cebu City and assigned a lay brother as administrator of the Mandaue estate. The mission did not seem to have a priest permanently assigned to it, because it was not around 1724 when the Jesuit catalogues specify that a Jesuit was posted at Mandaue and that his responsibility extended to Talibon and Inabanga in Bohol. Thus, for more than a century, Mandaue may have been served by Jesuits of the Colegio who took turns in attending to the spiritual needs of the people. Although the Jesuits did build a church in Mandaue in honor of the fatherhood and protection of Saint Joseph, a 1789 report describes the church as "sufficiently deteriorated". Augustinian writers Felipe Bravo and Manuel Buzeta described the structure as mediana fabrica or mixed fabric. When the Jesuits were expelled from the Philippines in 1768, the administration of Mandaue was handled by the Augustinian Recollects until 1898.

The church was damaged in an earthquake in 1922 and repairs were completed in 1936. The top of the church façade also saw the addition of a bell tower in 1936. But the church was severely damaged after an American bomb blew open the roof of the church during the Second World War. The bell tower, life-size images of the Last Supper, and records were damaged.

A major renovation was undertaken in 1998 where the pillars supporting the roof were removed. The renovation made the church rather different from its original appearance.

With the approval of the Catholic Bishops' Conference of the Philippines, Cardinal Ricardo J. Vidal, then Archbishop of Cebu, declared the parish as a national shrine on August 6, 2001.

At present, the parish is clustered under the Seventh Ecclesiastical District - Near North Cebu and under the Vicariate of Saint Joseph, which comprises seven other parishes within Mandaue.
