= Mandaue Presidencia =

City hall in Mandaue, Philippines

Mandaue City Hall
- Municipio
- Interactive map of the Mandaue City Hall area
- Former names: Mandaue Presidencia

General information
- Type: City Hall
- Architectural style: Neo-Grec and Art Deco
- Location: Mandaue City, Philippines
- Coordinates: 10°19′39″N 123°56′35″E
- Completed: 1937 (central wing); 1975 (left and right wings)

Technical details
- Floor count: 2

The Mandaue City Hall, commonly referred to as Mandaue Presidencia, is admixture of the Neo-Grec and Art Deco stylistic movement building that serves as the seat of government for the city of Mandaue, Philippines. The building found in the heart of the city was first used as the office of Mandaue's presidente or mayor since the Commonwealth era.

== History ==
The Mandaue Presidencia was inaugurated on 12 September 1937 during the incumbency of Cebu Governor Sotero B. Cabahug. Its construction begun two years earlier with an estimated cost at that time of Php 28,000.00. During the Second World War, the presidencia was used as a garrison by the Japanese Imperial forces. On 19 March 1975, the new city hall was inaugurated. A second and third wing was added to the left side and the right side of the main building. An additional floor was also added from the main building connecting to the two new wings. From the original L shape of the old municipal hall floor plan, the new city hall format has now become an E-formed floor plan.
