= Casuntingan, Mandaue =

Barangay in Mandaue, Philippines

Casuntingan
- Barangay
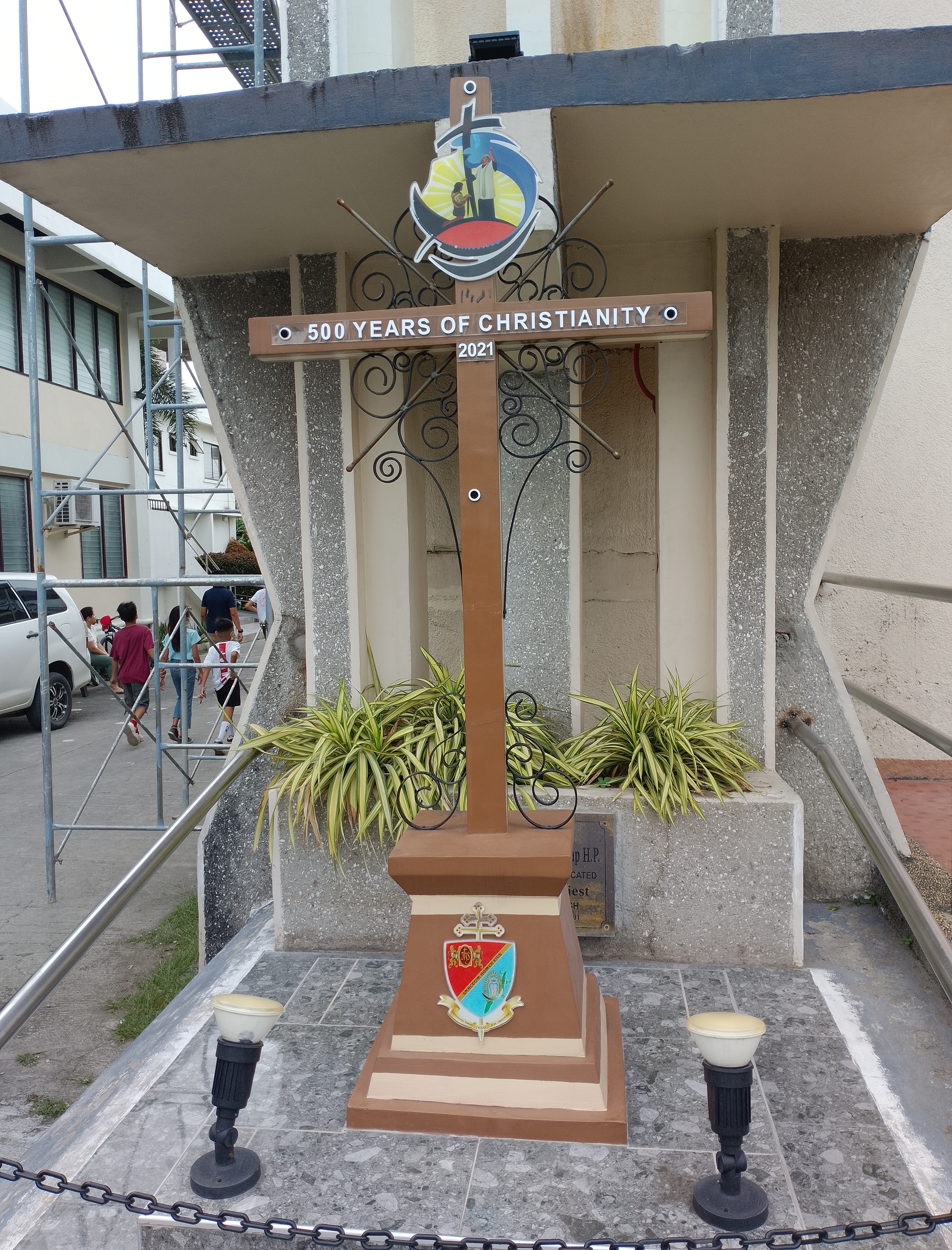
- Gethsemane Parish at the south of Casuntingan

- Location within Visayas, Philippines Location within Philippines
- Coordinates: 10°20′50″N 123°55′53″E
- Country: Philippines
- Region: Central Visayas
- Province: Cebu (geographically only)
- City: Mandaue

Area
  - Total: 0.79 km^{2} (0.31 sq mi)
- Elevation: 21 m (69 ft)

Population (2020)
  - Total: 16,846
  - Density: 21,000/km^{2} (55,000/sq mi)
- Time zone: UTC+8 (PST)
- ZIP code: 6014

Casuntingan is a barangay in the city of Mandaue, Cebu Province, Central Visayas, Philippines. It borders Tingub to its north, Maguikay to its east, Bakilid and Banilad to its south, and Cabancalan to its west. As of the year 2020, Casuntingan has a total population of 16,846.

== Geography ==
Casuntingan is located at the western portion of Mandaue, covering an area of 0.79 squared kilometer. Its average elevation is at 21 meters above the sea level.
