= Mandaue =

Highly urbanized city in Central Visayas, Philippines

- Highly urbanized city
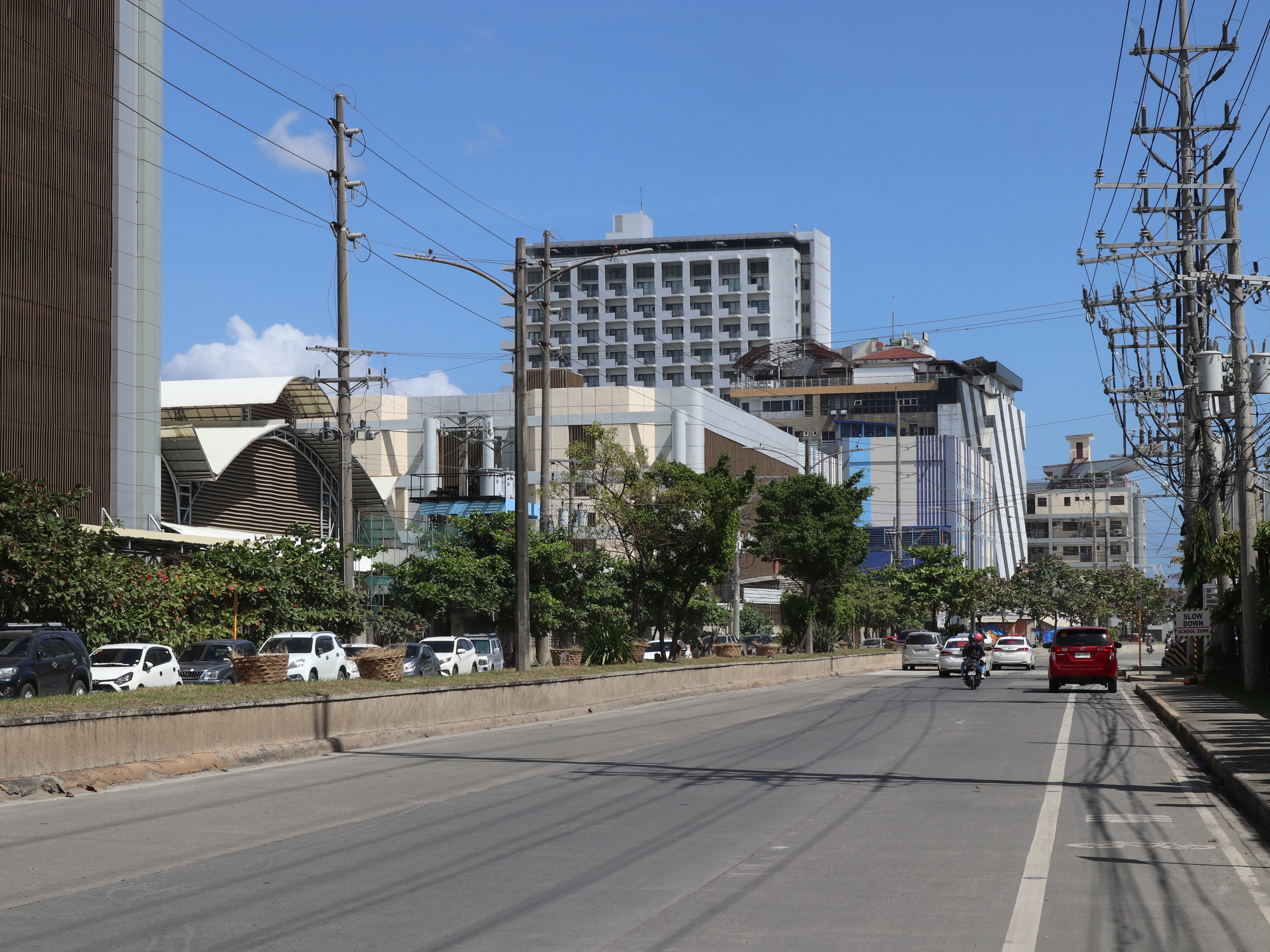
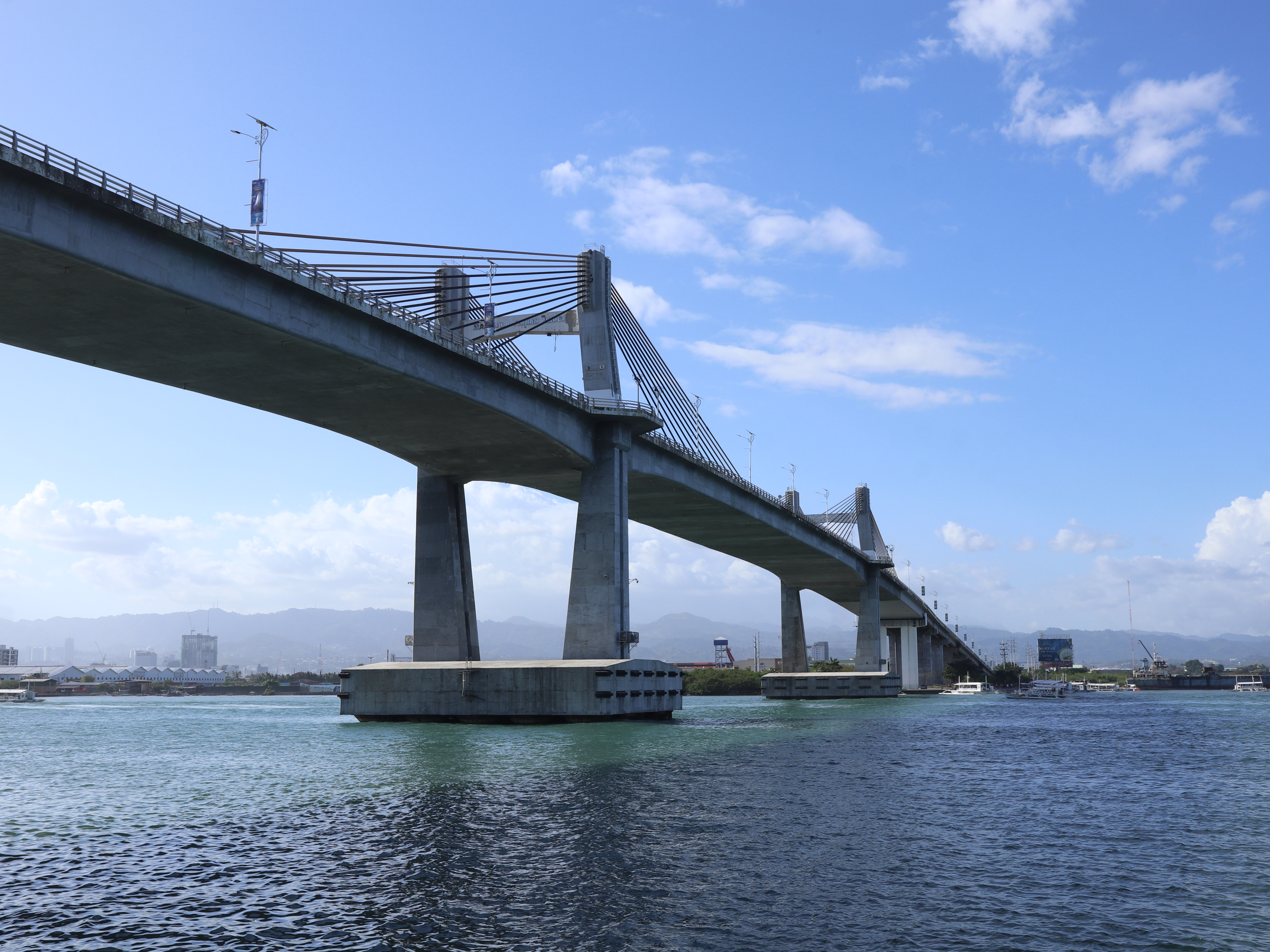
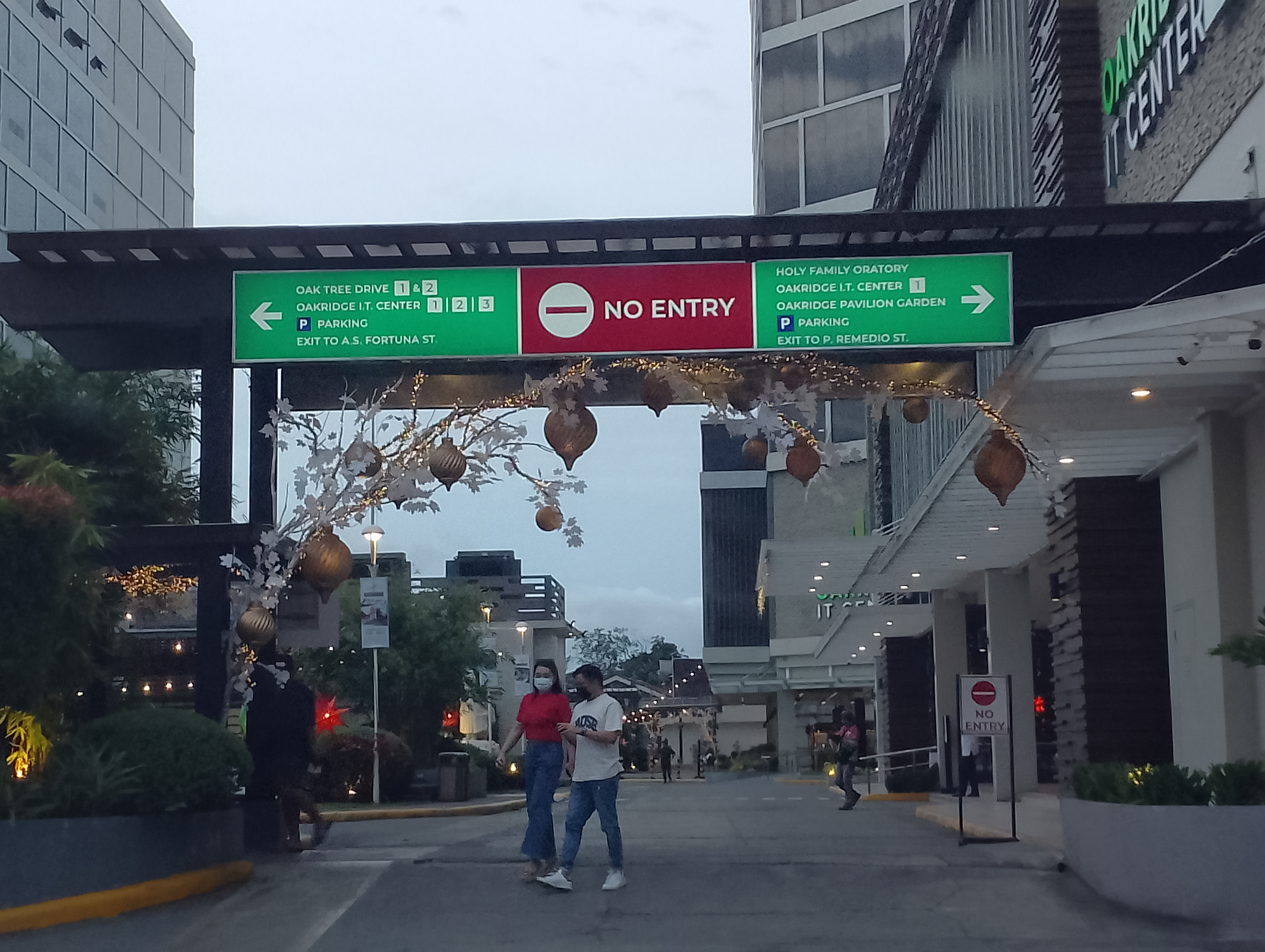
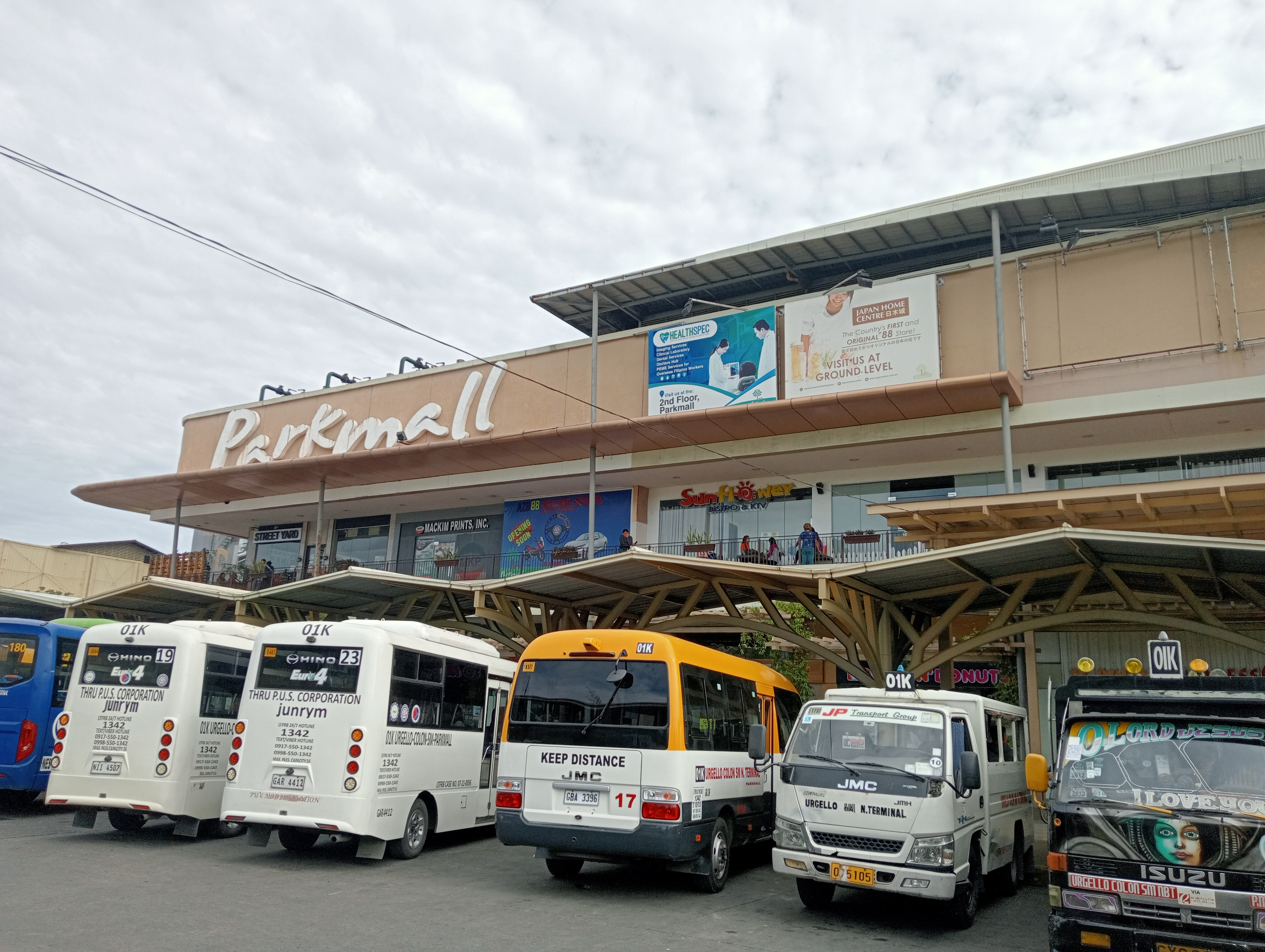
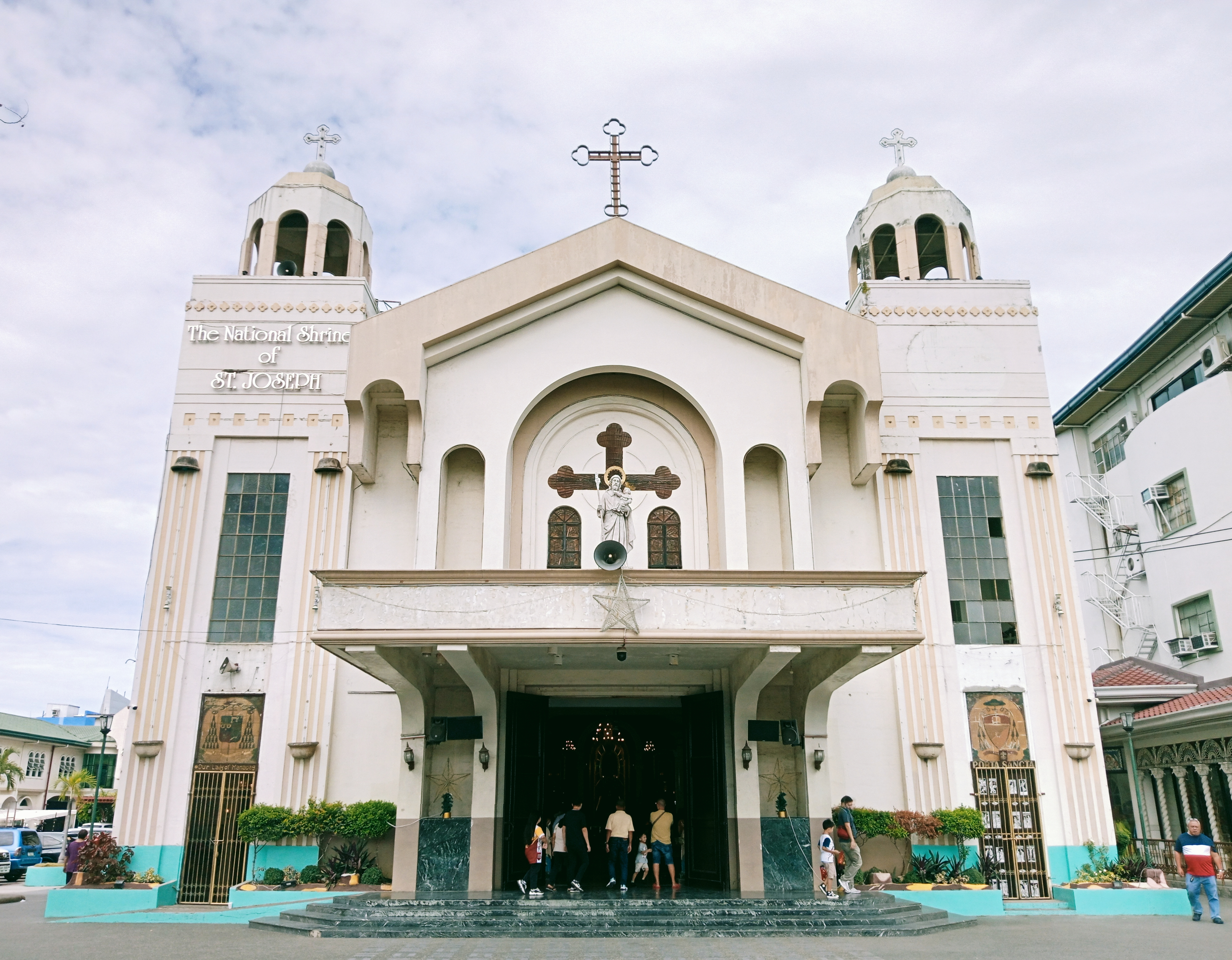
- Mandaue Presidencia Zuellig Avenue Marcelo Fernan Bridge Oakridge Business Park Parkmall Mandaue branch Mandaue Church

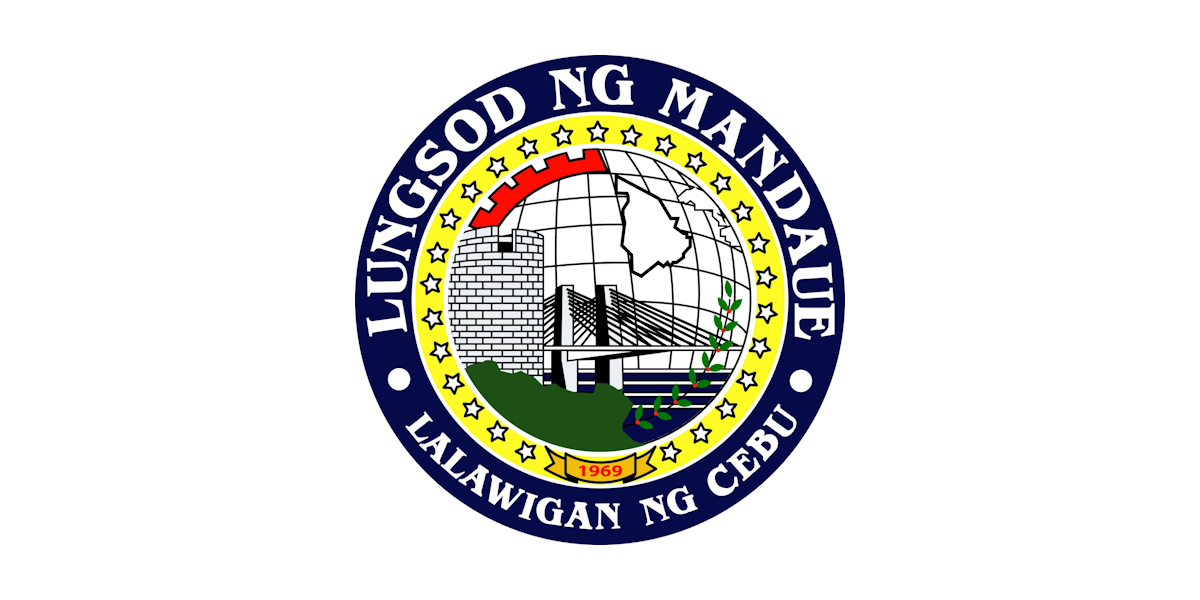
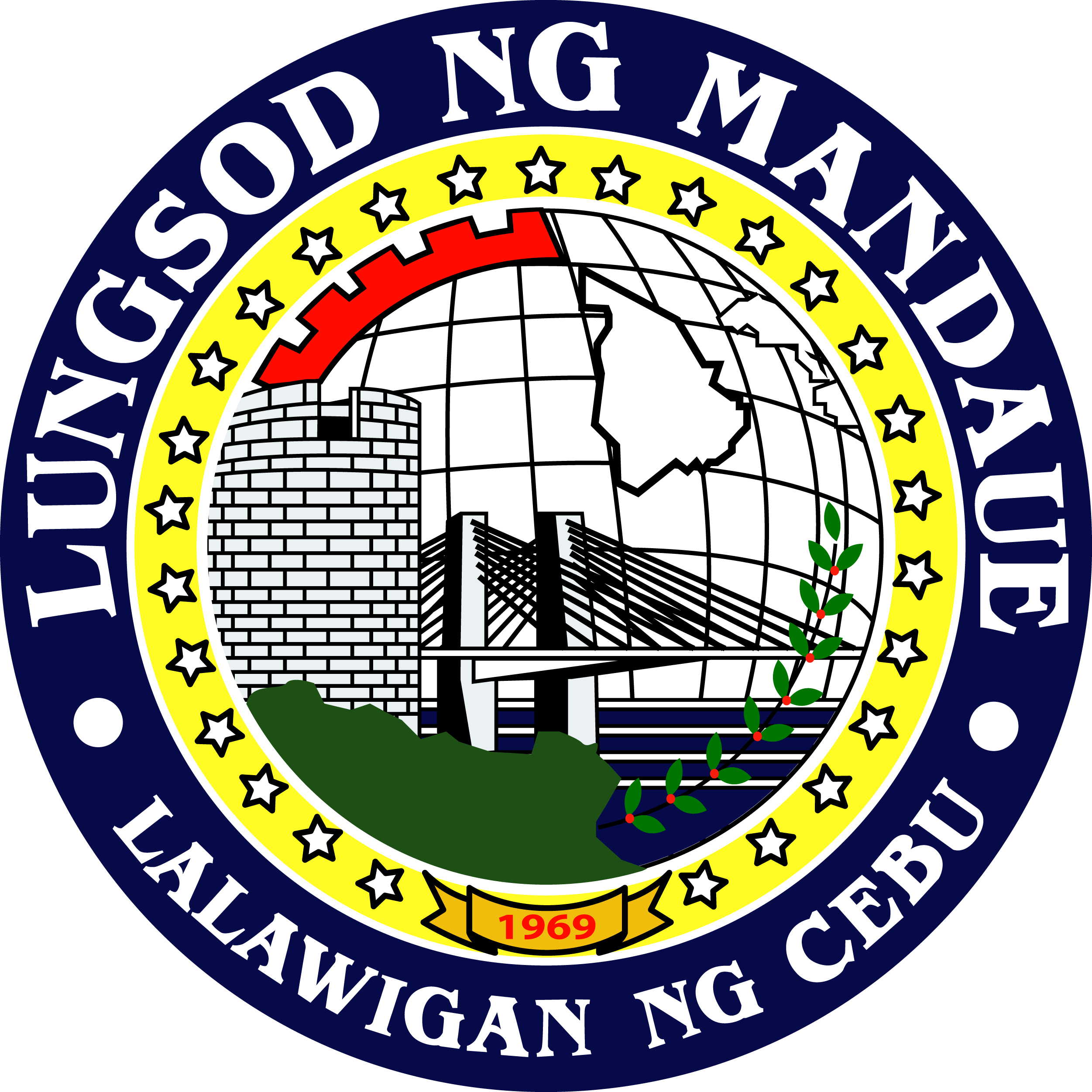
- Flag Seal
- Nicknames: Furniture Capital of the Philippines; Industrial City of Southern Philippines
- Anthem: Mandaue ang Dakbayan; English: Mandaue, the City
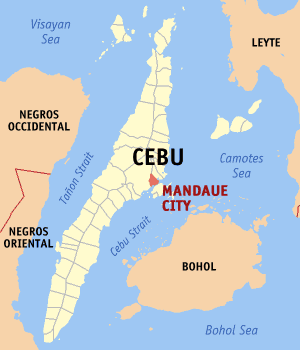
- Map of Central Visayas with Mandaue highlighted
- Interactive map of Mandaue
- Location within the Philippines
- Coordinates: 10°20′N 123°56′E
- Country: Philippines
- Region: Central Visayas
- Province: Cebu (highly urbanized city participating in the provincial government of Cebu)
- District: Lone district
- Pueblo: circa 1656
- Municipality Status: 1901
- Cityhood: August 30, 1969
- Highly urbanized city: February 15, 1991
- Barangays: 27 (see Barangays)

Government
  - Type: Sangguniang Panlungsod
  - Mayor: Thadeo Jovito “Jonkie” M. Ouano (Lakas)
  - Vice Mayor: Glenn O. Bercede (1Cebu)
  - Representative: Emmarie M. Ouano-Dizon (Lakas-CMD)
  - City Council: Members: Nerissa Corazon C. Soon-Ruiz; Malcolm A. Sanchez; Jimmy C. Lumapas; Jesus P. Arcilla Jr.; Marie Immaline C. Cortes-Zafra; Cynthia C. Remedio; Jennifer S. del Mar; Joel M. Seno; Cesar Y. Cabahug Jr.; Andreo O. Icalina
  - Electorate: 236,853 voters (2025)

Area
  - Total: 34.87 km^{2} (13.46 sq mi)
- Elevation: 22 m (72 ft)
- Highest elevation: 984 m (3,228 ft)
- Lowest elevation: 0 m (0 ft)

Population (2024 census)
  - Total: 364,482
  - Density: 10,450/km^{2} (27,070/sq mi)
  - Households: 103,345

Economy
  - Gross domestic product (GDP): ₱109.6 billion (2022) $1.936 billion (2022)
  - Income class: 1st city income class
  - Poverty incidence: 7.2% (2023)
  - Revenue: ₱ 3,713 million (2024)
  - Assets: ₱ 35,779 million (2024)
  - Expenditure: ₱ 2,616 million (2024)
  - Liabilities: ₱ 2,794 million (2024)

Service provider
  - Electricity: Visayan Electric Company (VECO)
  - Water: Metropolitan Cebu Water District (MCWD)
- Time zone: UTC+8 (PST)
- ZIP code: 6014
- PSGC: 072230000
- IDD : area code: +63 (0)32
- Native language: Cebuano
- Website: www.mandauecity.gov.ph

Mandaue (locally [mɐnˈdaʊ.ɛ]), officially the City of Mandaue (Cebuano: Dakbayan sa Mandaue; Filipino: Lungsod ng Mandaue), is a highly urbanized city in the Central Visayas region of the Philippines. According to the 2024 census, it has a population of 364,482 people.

It is geographically located on the central-eastern coastal region of Cebu by Philippine Statistics Authority but administratively independent from the province. Its southeast coast borders Mactan Island where Lapu-Lapu City is located and is connected to the island via two bridges: the Mactan-Mandaue Bridge and Marcelo Fernan Bridge. Mandaue is bounded on the north by the town of Consolacion, to the east by the Camotes Sea, and to the west and south by Cebu City.

It is one of three highly urbanized cities on Cebu island and forms a part of the Cebu Metropolitan area and was part of the sixth district of Cebu joined with the municipalities of Consolacion and Cordova - it was qualified for a lone district since 1991. On April 5, 2019, the city became a lone legislative district. As of June 30, 2022, Mandaue had its first representation in the 19th Congress of the Philippines.

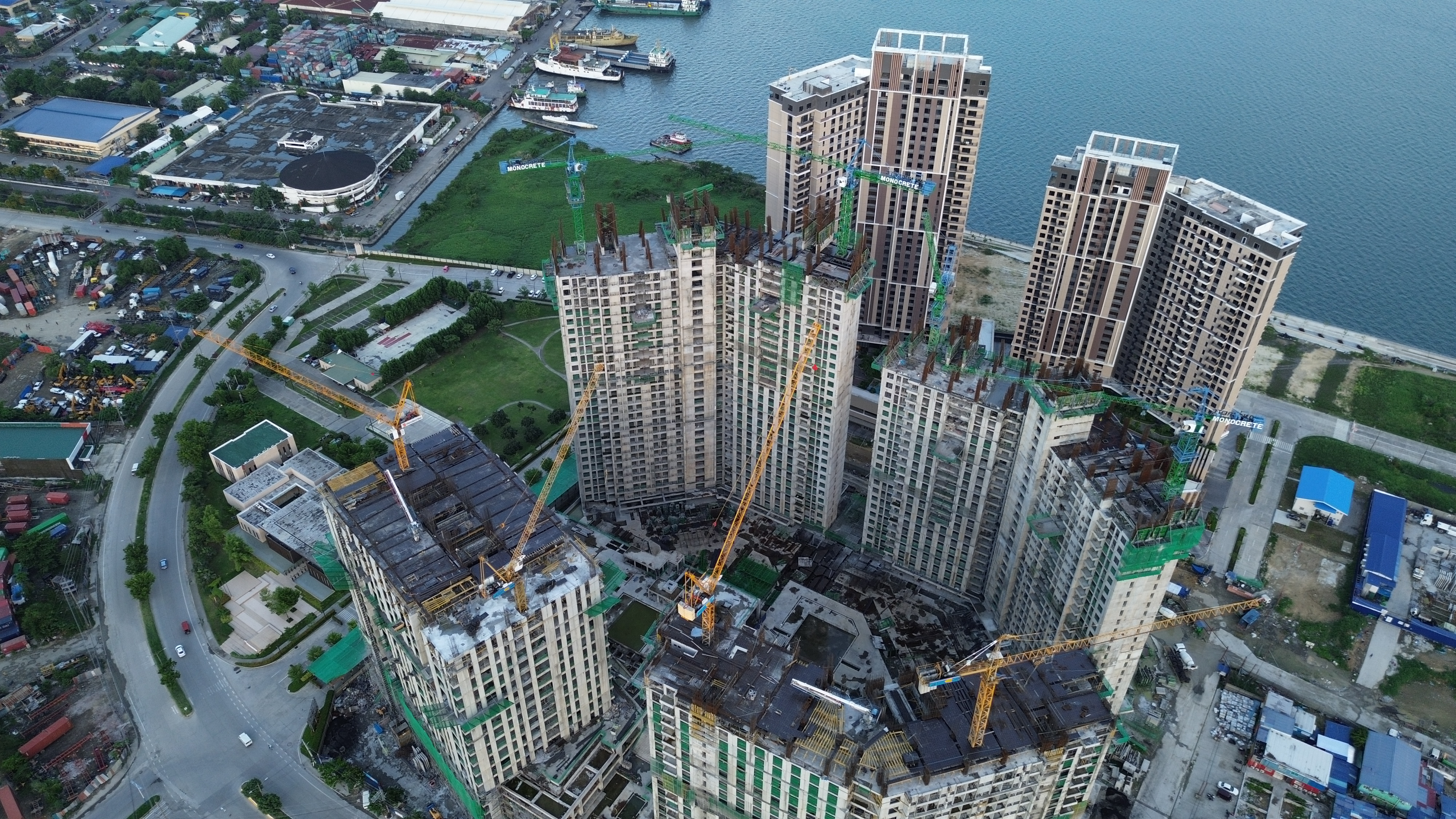
Mandani Bay in Construction May 2023 Photo: Bart Sakwerda, Budots Media

== History ==
A community was established in Mandaue by a flourishing group of Austronesian people. The Venetian chronicler Antonio Pigafetta wrote of a settlement called "Mandaui" which existed in the area with a chieftain named Apanoaan some called him Lambuzzan in other accounts.

Mandaue natives were forced into a town as decreed by the Spanish authorities. This may have started off as a mission village (which included present day Consolacion, Liloan and Poro) serving as a bulwark for the church in the northern Cebu and was managed by the Jesuit in 1638 then a century later by the Recollects. During the year 1818, Mandaue had tributes representing 2,729 native families and 20 Spanish-Filipino families.

The Philippine Revolution of 1898 gave the town a new form of administration in accordance with the organic decree of the Central Revolutionary Government. The short-lived revolution was overthrown by the American troops and a battle nearly destroyed the town in 1901, killing Presidente Benito Ceniza.

Mandaue functioned as a semi-autonomous town under the jurisdiction of Cebu. Although it was developed and organized during the Spanish period and experienced population growth over time, it was not elevated to an independent municipality by Spanish authorities. Following the death of Presidente Ceniza and the establishment of American rule, the town’s long-standing aspiration for independence was realized. In 1901, Mandaue was formally established as an independent municipality.

Mandaue became independent from being an American Commonwealth and a Japanese garrison on July 4, 1946, along with the entire nation.

=== Cityhood ===
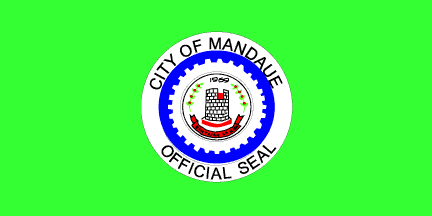
Former flag of Mandaue

On August 30, 1969, Mandaue became a chartered city and decades later it was recognized as a highly urbanized city on February 15, 1991. In early-April 2019, Mandaue separated from the sixth district and, since 2022, is represented under its lone district.

== Geography ==
The city has a total area of 34.87 km^{2} (13.46 sq mi). According to the 2020 census, the population density is 10,000/km^{2} (26,000/sq mi).

Land utilization

Category	Land Area		
Category	ha	acres	
Industrial	1,695	4,190	51.4%
Residential	872	2,150	26.5%
Agricultural	283	700	8.6%
Commercial	242	600	7.3%
Roads	120	300	3.6%
Institutional	60	150	1.8%
Parks	24	59	0.7%

The city is the 6th smallest government unit in terms of land area; among the Metro Cebu local government units the city is the second smallest next to the municipality of Cordova in the island of Mactan. The city's land area is only 4.5% of the total land area of Metro Cebu and less than 1% of the total land of the province of Cebu.

The North Reclamation Project, now known as the North Special Administrative Zone, currently has about 180 ha (440 acres) reclaimed land. Of the 180 hectares, about 36 ha (89 acres) belong to the city.

It is one of the two (the other one being the municipality of Consolacion) local government units located within the mainland Metro Cebu where the elevation of land is less than 100 m (330 ft).

Many of the areas of the city are extremely flat. About 77.37% is within the 0-8% slope category. Barangays belonging to this region are Centro, Looc, South Special Administrative Zone, Cambaro, Opao, Umapad, Paknaan, Alang-alang, Tipolo, Ibabao, Guizo, Subangdaku, Mantuyong, Maguikay and Tabok. The greater portion of the city, comprising about 70%, is dominated by the Mandaue Clay Loam soil series. This is found in the 0-2% and 2-5% slope ranges. Faraon clay loam characterizes the rest of the land with slope range from 5-8% and up to 25-40%.

=== Climate ===
Climate data for Mandaue
Month	Jan	Feb	Mar	Apr	May	Jun	Jul	Aug	Sep	Oct	Nov	Dec	Year
Mean daily maximum °C (°F)	28 (82)	29 (84)	30 (86)	31 (88)	31 (88)	30 (86)	30 (86)	30 (86)	30 (86)	29 (84)	29 (84)	28 (82)	30 (85)
Mean daily minimum °C (°F)	23 (73)	23 (73)	23 (73)	24 (75)	25 (77)	25 (77)	25 (77)	25 (77)	25 (77)	25 (77)	24 (75)	23 (73)	24 (75)
Average precipitation mm (inches)	70 (2.8)	49 (1.9)	62 (2.4)	78 (3.1)	138 (5.4)	201 (7.9)	192 (7.6)	185 (7.3)	192 (7.6)	205 (8.1)	156 (6.1)	111 (4.4)	1,639 (64.6)
Average rainy days	13.4	10.6	13.1	14.5	24.2	27.9	28.4	27.7	27.1	27.4	22.5	15.9	252.7
Source: Meteoblue

=== Barangays ===
Mandaue is politically subdivided into 27 barangays. Each barangay consists of puroks and some have sitios.

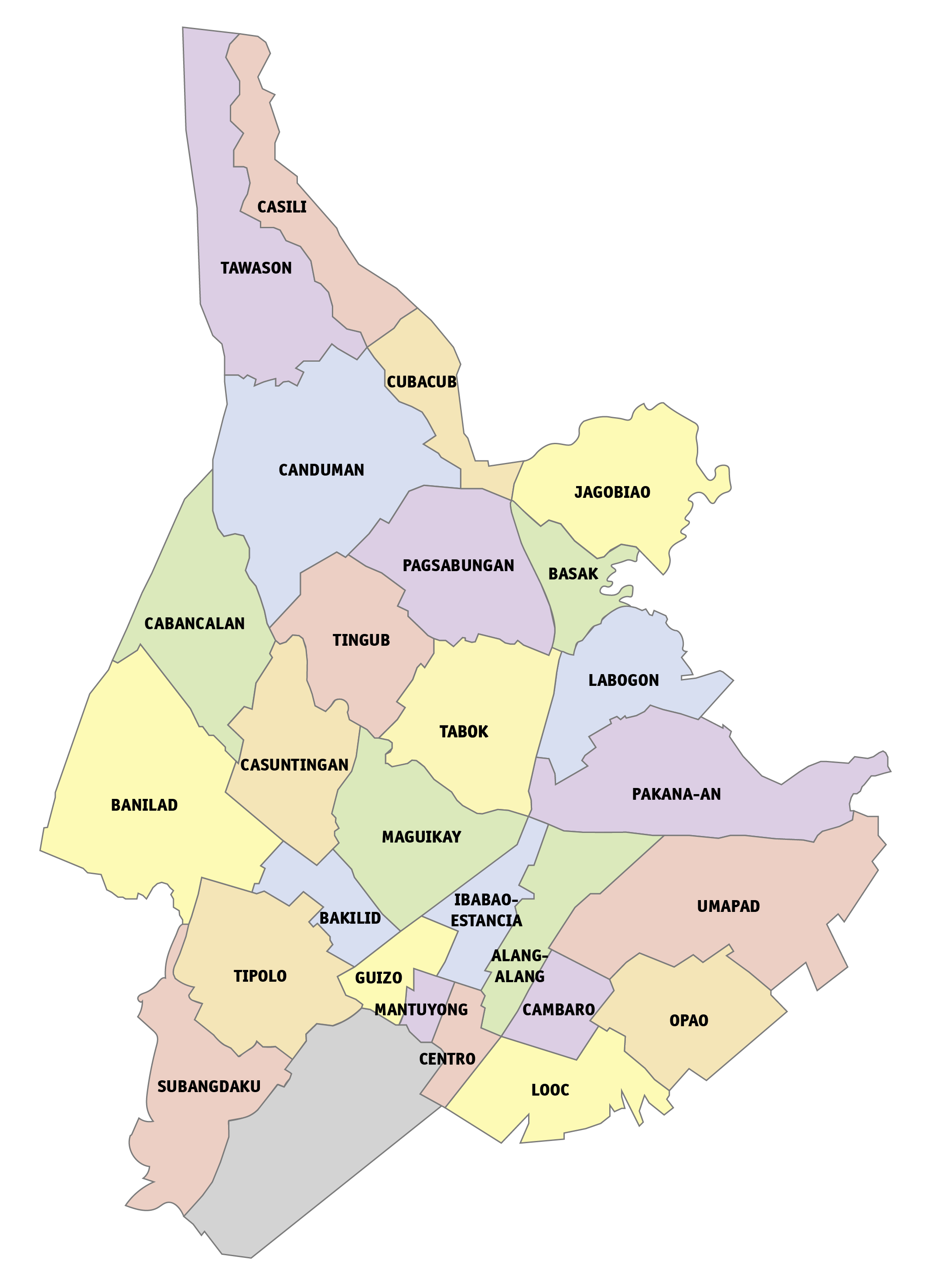
Political map of Mandaue

PSGC	Barangay	Population			±% p.a.	
		2024		2010		
072230001	Alang-alang	3.2%	11,495	12,475	▾	−0.56%
072230002	Bakilid	1.2%	4,387	5,027	▾	−0.93%
072230003	Banilad	5.0%	18,386	22,297	▾	−1.32%
072230004	Basak	3.2%	11,777	7,858	▴	2.82%
072230005	Cabancalan	4.1%	14,841	12,202	▴	1.35%
072230006	Cambaro	2.5%	8,990	8,082	▴	0.73%
072230007	Canduman	6.4%	23,455	17,100	▴	2.20%
072230008	Casili	1.5%	5,403	3,743	▴	2.55%
072230009	Casuntingan	4.6%	16,846	13,217	▴	1.68%
072230010	Centro (Poblacion)	0.8%	2,980	3,236	▾	−0.56%
072230011	Cubacub	3.8%	13,832	8,255	▴	3.61%
072230012	Guizo	2.0%	7,258	8,554	▾	−1.12%
072230013	Ibabao-Estancia	1.9%	6,994	8,641	▾	−1.44%
072230014	Jagobiao	3.3%	12,138	12,227	▾	−0.05%
072230015	Labogon	5.6%	20,466	19,175	▴	0.45%
072230016	Looc	4.8%	17,395	14,438	▴	1.29%
072230017	Maguikay	4.1%	14,956	17,782	▾	−1.18%
072230018	Mantuyong	1.5%	5,487	5,869	▾	−0.46%
072230019	Opao	3.3%	12,014	9,907	▴	1.33%
072230020	Paknaan	8.4%	30,532	22,957	▴	1.98%
072230021	Pagsabungan	5.6%	20,266	16,838	▴	1.28%
072230022	Subangdaku	4.7%	17,097	20,333	▾	−1.18%
072230023	Tabok	5.3%	19,486	15,709	▴	1.49%
072230024	Tawason	1.9%	6,984	4,891	▴	2.48%
072230025	Tingub	1.7%	6,082	5,780	▴	0.35%
072230026	Tipolo	4.3%	15,790	17,273	▾	−0.61%
072230027	Umapad	5.2%	18,779	17,454	▴	0.50%
	Total		364,482	331,320	▴	0.66%

== Demographics ==
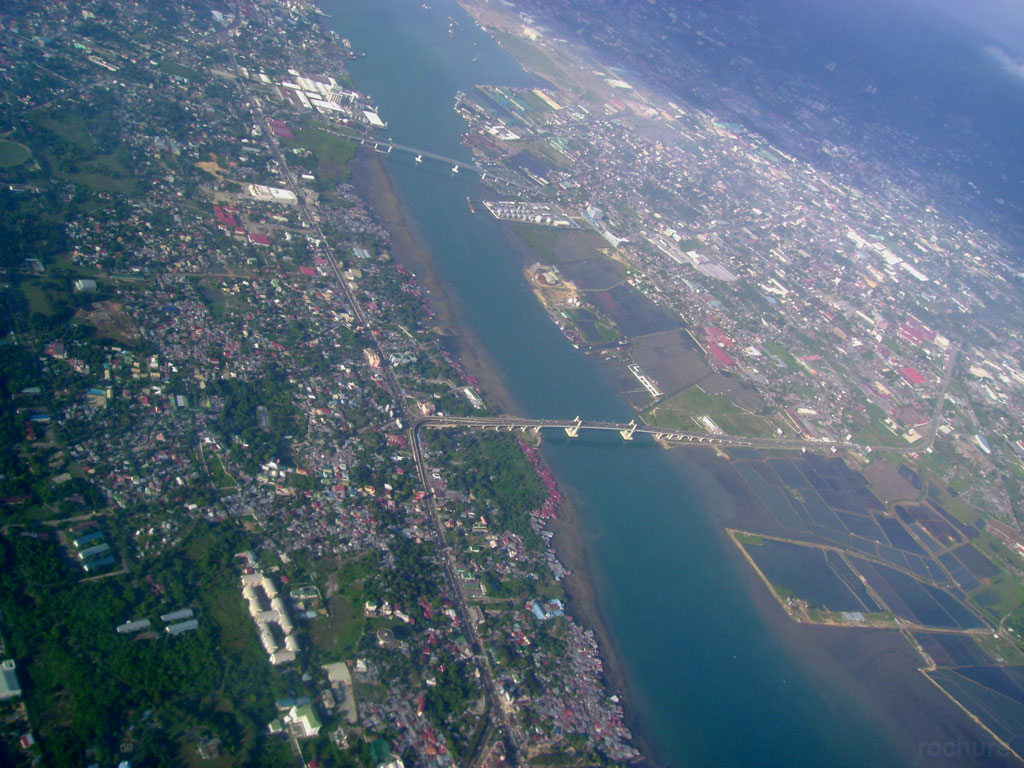
Aerial photo of the Mactan Channel looking south. Mandaue is on the right side while Lapu-Lapu City is on the left

Population census of Mandaue
Year	Pop.	±% p.a.
1903	11,078	—
1918	21,086	+4.38%
1939	17,431	−0.90%
1948	19,068	+1.00%
1960	29,281	+3.64%
1970	58,579	+7.17%
1975	75,904	+5.33%
1980	110,590	+7.81%
1990	174,342	+4.66%
1995	194,745	+2.10%
2000	259,728	+6.37%
2007	318,577	+2.86%
2010	331,320	+1.44%
2015	362,654	+1.74%
2020	364,116	+0.08%
2024	364,482	+0.02%
Source: Philippine Statistics Authority

Data showed that the oldest written accounts of Mandaue came from a population of 160 in 1637 to 1638. Mandaue had 10,309 souls according to the Buzeta & Bravo (1850). During the first year of its township in 1899, Mandaue had 42 barrios with a population of 21,086. When Mandaue was a second-class municipality in 1964, its population was 33,811.

According to the 2024 census, it has a population of 364,482 people. Among all the Philippine's highly urbanized cities, the City of Mandaue posted the highest proportion of household population who reported Roman Catholic as their religious affiliation at 95.2%. Mandaue has a significantly large population at or below the poverty line.

== Economy ==
Poverty incidence of Mandaue (%)

Source: Philippine Statistics Authority

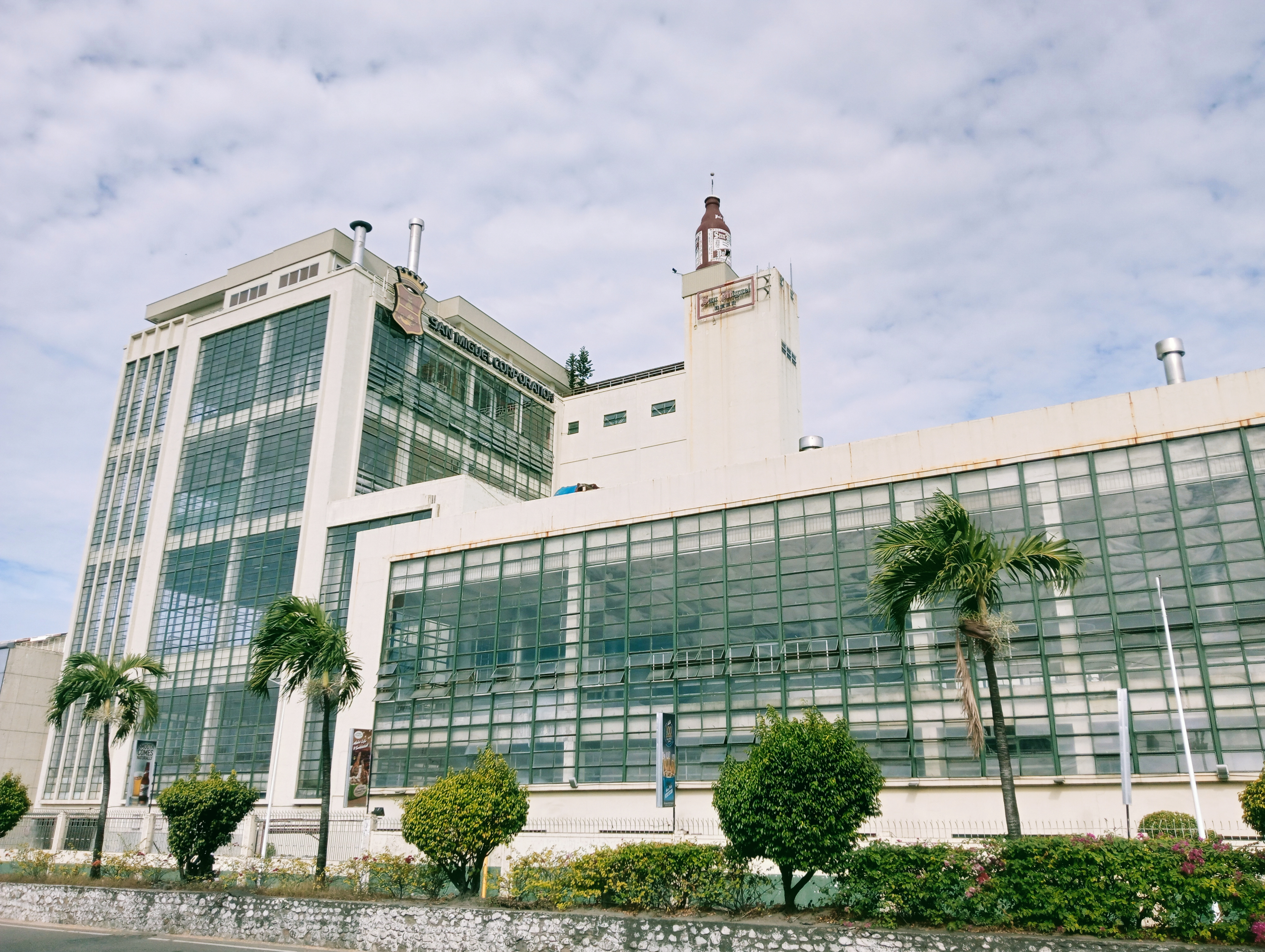
San Miguel Brewery Inc. - Mandaue Brewery

About 40 percent of Cebu's export companies are found in Mandaue. The city is dubbed as the industrial hub of Region VII and hosts about 10,000 industrial and commercial businesses, making it a "little rich city" in the country.

It is home to some of the world's biggest companies such as San Miguel Corp., Coca-Cola Bottling Corp. Shemberg, the number one exporter of carrageenan, Monde Nissin, Profood International Corp., and 7D Dried Mangoes. The bakery chain Julie's Bakeshop also opened its first branch in the city's Wireless district on January 6, 1981. Mandaue City also accounts for 75 percent of the country's total exports in the furniture sector, making the city the furniture capital of the country. One of these furniture companies is Mandaue Foam which started in 1971 and now has 25 factories and showrooms nationwide.

== Tourism ==
Mandaue's points of interest, destinations, and attractions include:

Natural areas

- Monkey Caves
- Cansaga Bay
- Butuanon River
- Casili Hills
- Jagobiao Spring
- Cabancalan-Banilad Sinkholes
- Mahiga River

Historical locations

- Bantayan Sa Hari
- National Shrine of Saint Joseph
- Mandaue Presidencia, City Hall
- Ouano Wharf
- Mandaue Salt Beds
- Eversley Childs Sanitarium
- Rizal-Bonifacio Memorial Library
- Bathan Press
- San Miguel Brewery
- Rainbow Lane
- Cebu International Convention Center

Museums

- 856 G Gallery
- Luis Cabrera Ancestral House and Museum
- Mandaue City Public Library
- Quijano Museum

Parks

- City Plaza
- Bridge Park
- Ibabao Mandaue Agri-Eco Park
- Subangdaku Wireless Sports Center
- Cebu Westown Lagoon
- WaterWorld Cebu

Sports

- Wireless Plaza and Sports Complex
- Mandaue City Sports and Cultural Complex
- Mandaue Tennis Complex
- Portside Badminton Plaza
- Quick Points Badminton Club
- San Roque Football Club
- Sacred Heart–Ateneo de Cebu Sports Complex
- Cebu Golf Academy
- Gorilla Booth Camp

Retail and mixed-use developments

- Ayala Malls Gatewalk Central (under construction)
- Bridges Town Square
- City Times Square
- Insular Square Mall
- Mandani Bay
- Oakridge Business Park
- Pacific Mall
- Parkmall
- SM J Mall (formerly J Centre Mall)

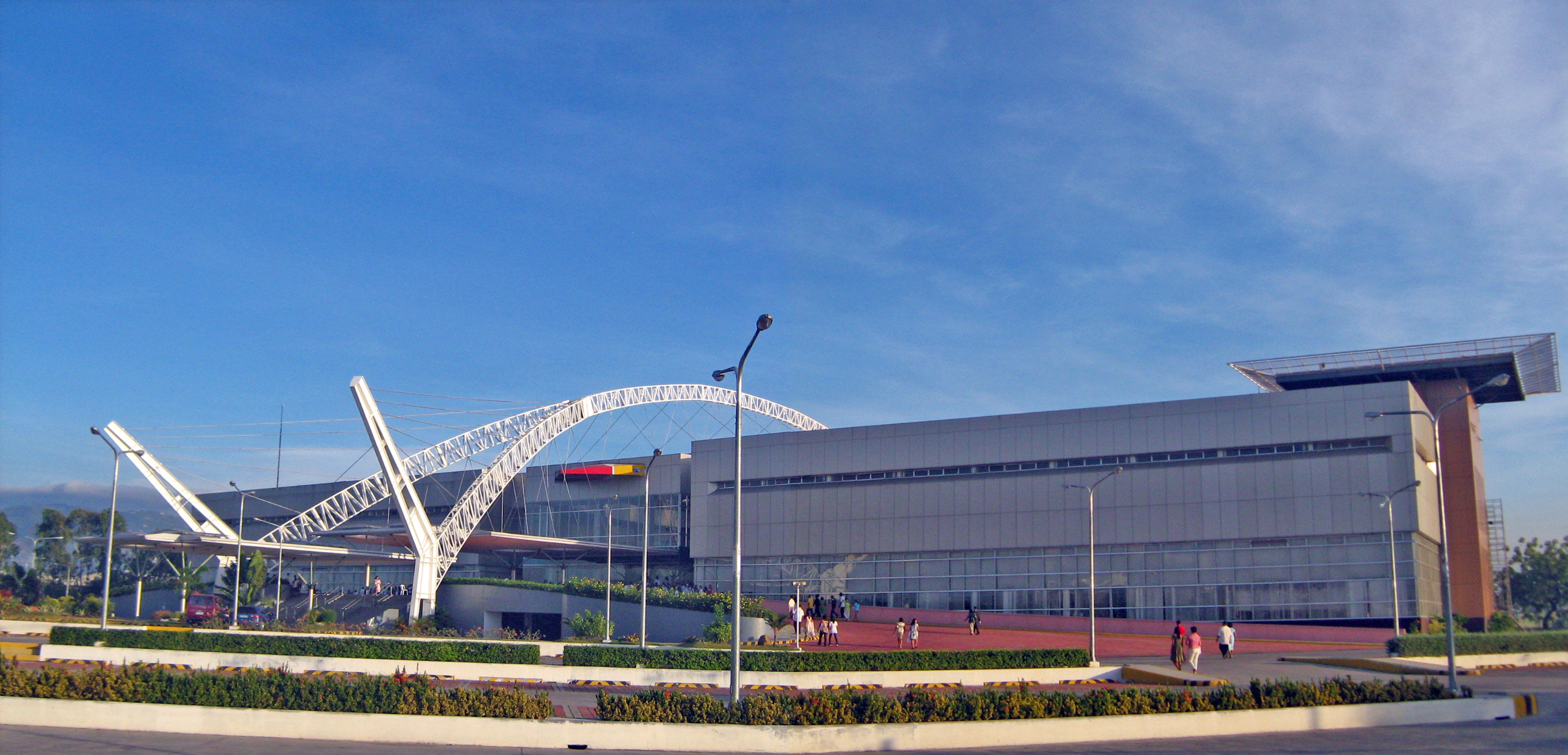
Cebu International Convention Centre

Bantayan sa Hari, 1912

=== Fiestas ===
Mandaue Fiesta: Celebrated on May 8 in honor of the town patron, Saint Joseph. Activities that are typically held during this feast are the procession, inter-barangay sports competition, Miss Mandaue (the longest-running beauty competition in the province), rodeos, street festival (Mantawi Festival), bailes, fairs, and many more.

Panagtagbo sa Mandaue: This is Mandaue's current major festival in honor of the Holy Family. This is celebrated every 2nd week of January on the eve of the Traslacion (Transfer of Relic), of one of the significant religious events of the Sinulog Festival which commemorates the union of the Holy Family. In the Translacion, the Santo Niño and the Virgin of Guadalupe come and stay over at the shrine of Saint Joseph in Mandaue for an overnight vigil. This happens on a Friday, and on the early morning of the following Saturday, a fluvial procession is held on Cebu Strait going back to the Basilica . In the festival, there are singing and dancing competitions with a street dancing during the Bibingkahan in honor of Santo Niño. At night, there is a ritual showdown performance which is the highlight of the cultural-religious events.

Kabayo Festival: The Kabayo (Horse) festival also known as Governor's Cup is a horse racing and different equestrian sports with the western way of riding event held annually in the second week of February.

Pasigarbo sa Sugbo: It is a festival showcasing Cebu's culture, faith, history, products, and festivals from each individual town. It is held annually around August 6 which is the Charter day of the Province of Cebu. It was formerly held in Mandaue City at the Cebu International Convention Center (CICC), but was transferred to the Cebu City Sports Complex in Cebu City in 2019 due to the abandoned and disrepaired state of the convention center.

== Cuisine ==
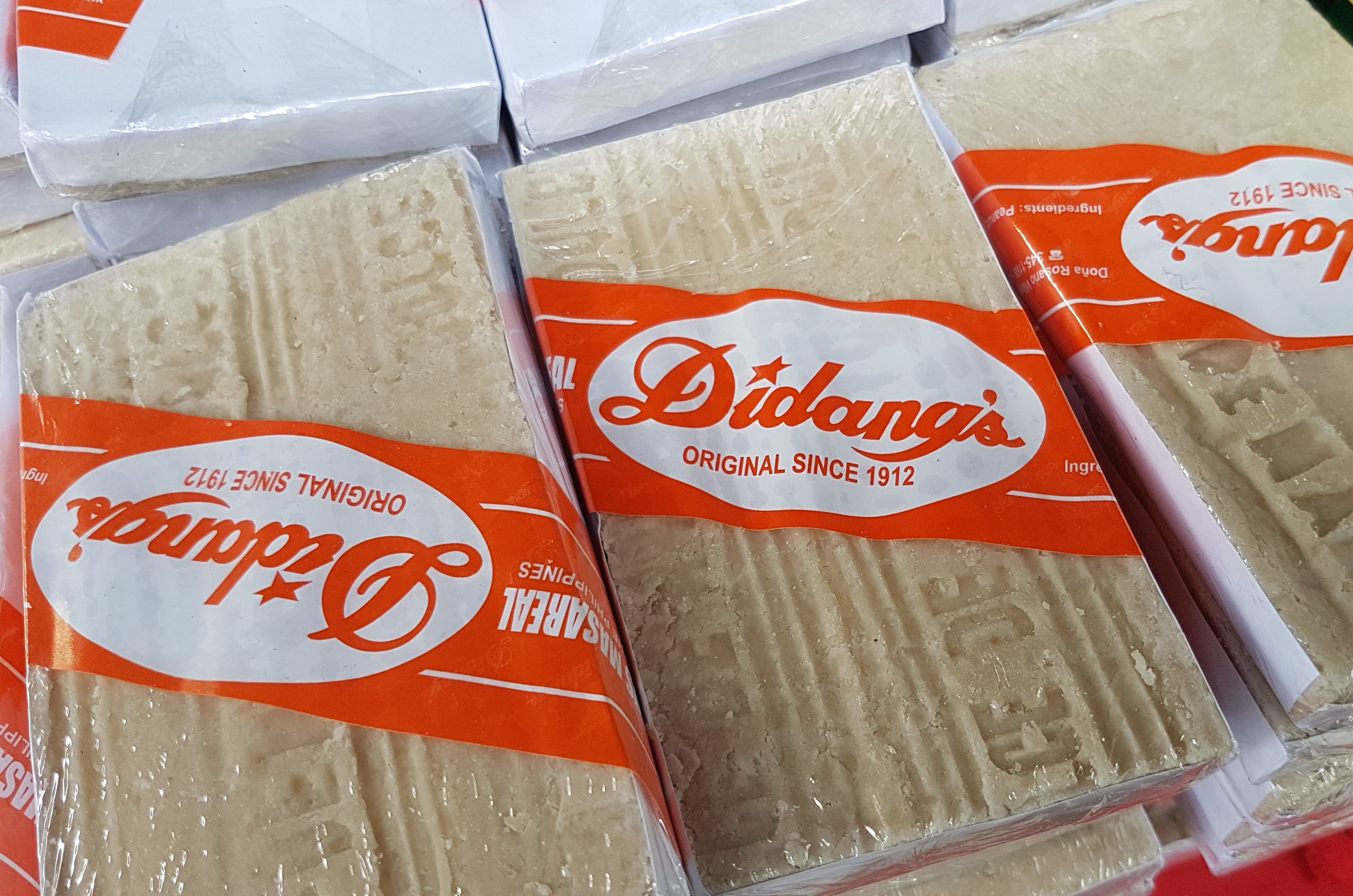
Masareal from Mandaue

Mandaue has many restaurants which cater to gourmets and international cuisines like Italian, Japanese, Indian, Mediterranean, Lebanese, Arabic, Russian, Korean, Mexican, and Western cuisines. A variety of restaurants also serves meals of local cuisine. Many famous Cebuano meals like the lechon or inasal, eaten with achara or pickled vegetables. The sugba or barbecue of either isda (fish), baboy (pork), manok (chicken) or baka (beef) is found all over Mandaue eaten with puso, a diamond-shaped hanged rice covered in coco leaves. Kinilaw is raw meat usually pork or fish drenched in vinegar and salt. The buwad or dried seafood, either fish or squid, can be pungent with a crunchy and chewy texture. There are some exotic meals that can be found like dinuguan or pig's blood which is eaten like a soup. Barbecued chicken feet are liked by many locals.

Original cuisine in Mandaue includes bibingka which is steamed rice cakes mixed with coconut and sometimes egg. Binangos paired with rice is made of ground up corn with Bolinao fish. This dish is found only in Mandaue; other delicacies includes the tagaktak, the seasonal buriring fish (stewed with iba) and the famous masareal.

== Transportation ==
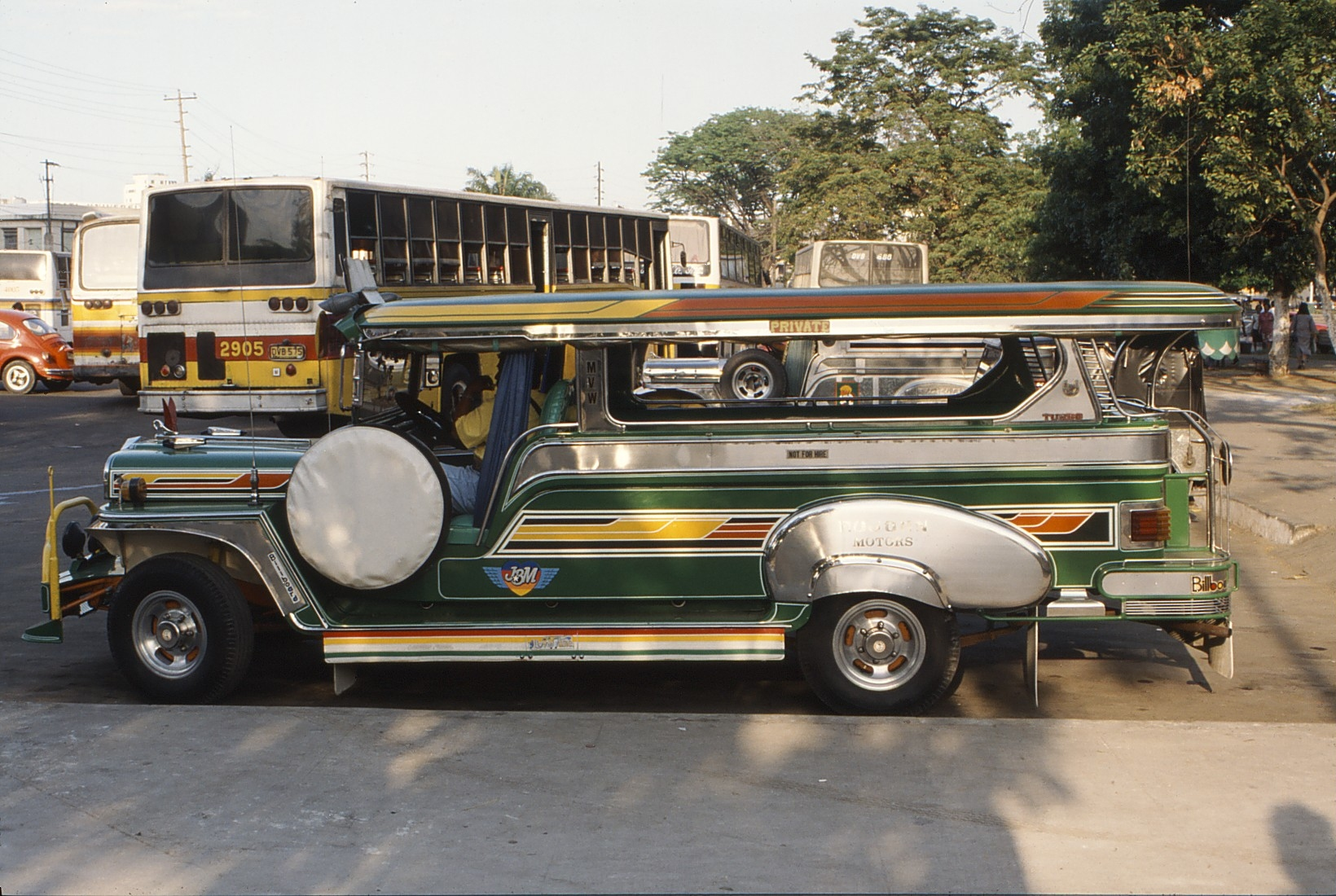
Philippine Jeepney

Mandaue City's road network consists of a national highway that connects the city to its neighboring cities and municipalities, and a national secondary road that traverses the city's metropolitan area. The total length of the city road network (paved and unpaved) and the four bridges, is about 133.7 km (83.1 mi), broken down into:

- National road - 13.2 km (8.2 mi)
- City road - 57.1 km (35.5 mi)
- Barangay road - 63.4 km (39.4 mi)

Road density is 5.31 km/km^{2} (8.55 mi/sq mi) of land. In terms of population, road density is 0.04 km (0.025 mi) per one thousand inhabitants.

Land transportation is being served by PUJ, utility vehicles, mini-buses, multi-cabs, tricycles, trisikads and for cargoes, trailers and vans. Sea transport of Mandaue is highly dependent on Port of Cebu and Cebu International Port, because of the city's proximity to these facilities.

MyBus expansion is a 9.5 kilometers new road starting from boundary of SM City Cebu – Cebu International Port to SM City J Mall in October 2024. In 2017, it began operations along City di Mare at the South Road Properties.

The city is served by the Mactan–Cebu International Airport (MCIA), which is accessible through Marcelo Fernan Bridge.

There are plans to build a fourth bridge crossing the Mactan Channel, dubbed as the Cebu–Mactan 4th Bridge. The project involves the construction of a 3.3-kilometer cable-stayed bridge, viaducts, and approach roads. Also, a 4.9-kilometer coastal road is included.

== Education ==
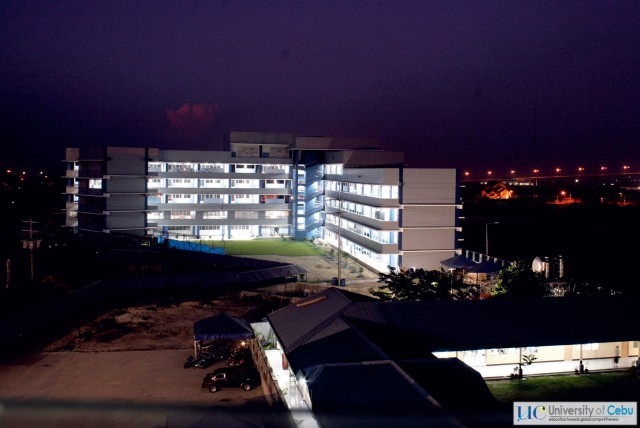
Lapu-Lapu–Mandaue campus of the University of Cebu.

Mandaue houses two universities, the Cebu Doctors' University and the Lapu-Lapu–Mandaue campus of the University of Cebu. There are also technical schools like TESDA in barangays Banilad and Looc and other private institutions that provide certificate degrees. Associate degree, Baccalaureate Degrees, Master's and Doctoral programs.

Mandaue has institutionalized learning with the Cabahug Medal which was started in 1923 by Sotero Cabahug as a medal of academic excellence annually. The Mandaue Fraternal Society was also created in the early part of the 19th century to provide a community for the professionals during the time when Mandaue was still a sleepy town.

Cebu's part-time Japanese school, the Cebu Japanese School (CJS; セブ補習授業校 Sebu Hoshū Jugyō Kō), is located on the fifth floor of the Clotilde Commercial Center in Barangay Casuntingan, Mandaue City.

== Media ==
NOTE: Television and radio stations from Cebu City are also primarily served in this area.

=== Television ===
Television stations based in Mandaue City:

- DYCB-TV (ABS-CBN Cebu) - Channel 3; a television station of the ABS-CBN's regional network division, ABS-CBN Regional, now defunct due to the cease and desist order issued by the National Telecommunications Commission after its legislative franchise lapsed last May 5, 2020 and its denial by the congress last July 10, 2020.
- DYKC-TV (RPTV 9) - Channel 9; a relay television station of the Radio Philippines Network / Nine Media Corporation.

=== Radio ===
Radio stations licensed in Mandaue City:

- DYKC-AM (Radyo Ronda) - 675 kHz; an AM radio station owned by the Radio Philippines Network (RPN) / Nine Media Corporation.
- DYAR-AM (Sonshine Radio) - 765 kHz; an AM radio station owned by Swara Sug Media Corporation and operated by Sonshine Media Network International (SMNI), currently off-air after the network issued a cease-and-desist order by the National Telecommunications Commission last December 2023.
- DYAB-AM (Radyo Patrol) 1512 kHz; an AM station owned by ABS-CBN Corporation, now defunct due to the cease and desist order issued by the National Telecommunications Commission (NTC) after its legislative franchise lapsed last May 5, 2020.
- DYPC-FM - 88.7 MHz; a community FM station owned by the Mandaue Broadcasting Center, an affiliate member of Vimcontu Broadcasting Corporation's radio station DYLA-AM in Cebu City. Currently off-air since 2019 due to non-renewal of permit.
- DYLS-FM (MOR Philippines) - 97.1 MHz; a commercial FM station owned by ABS-CBN Corporation, now defunct due to the cease and desist order issued by the National Telecommunications Commission after its legislative franchise lapsed last May 5, 2020.

== Sister cities ==
=== Local ===
- Bacolod
- Baguio
- Butuan
- Cauayan
- Dumaguete
- Iloilo City
- Marikina

=== International ===
- Bacău, Romania
- Mosul, Iraq
- Zibo, Shandong, China

== Sources ==
- Buzeta, Fr Manuel & Bravo, Fr Felipe, eds. (1850). Diccionario, geografico, estadistico, historico de las Islas Filipinas (2 vols) (in Spanish). Madrid: Imp. de D. José C. de la Peña.
- Cebu Daily News, Norman V. Mendoza (January 23, 2015). "Rainbow lane in Mandaue".
- Mojares, Resil B. (1999). The war against the Americans: resistance and collaboration in Cebu. Ateneo de Manila Press. ISBN 978-9715502986.
