= Sun Shimura =

Filipino politician (born 1982)

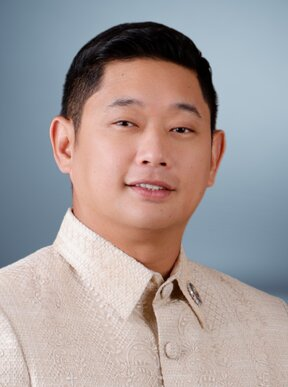
- Official portrait, 2025

Member of the House of Representatives of the Philippines of the Cebu's 4th congressional district
- Incumbent
- Assumed office June 30, 2025
- Preceded by: Janice Salimbangon

Mayor of Daanbantayan
- In office June 30, 2019 – June 30, 2025
- Preceded by: Augusto Corro
- Succeeded by: Atty. Gilbert Arrabis
- In office June 30, 2007 – June 30, 2010
- Preceded by: Ma. Luisa J. Loot
- Succeeded by: Ma. Luisa J. Loot

Member of the Cebu Provincial Board from the 4th District
- In office June 30, 2010 – June 30, 2019

Personal details
- Born: Sun Judal Shimura; December 3, 1982 (age 43) Cebu City, Cebu, Philippines
- Party: NUP (2011–2024; 2026–present); 1CEBU (2015–present)
- Other political affiliations: PMP (2024–2026); Lakas (2009–2011); KAMPI (2007–2009)
- Occupation: Politician

Sun Judal Shimura (born December 3, 1982) is a Filipino politician currently serving as the representative of Cebu's 4th congressional district in the House of Representatives of the Philippines since 2025.

== Political career ==
He began his political career in 2007 at the age of 24, becoming one of the youngest mayors in Cebu. He later served as a member of the Cebu Provincial Board representing the province’s 4th District from 2010 to 2019. In 2019, Shimura was re-elected as mayor of Daanbantayan and held the position until 2025.

In July 2022, he was unanimously elected as president of the League of Municipalities of the Philippines (LMP) Cebu Chapter. In October 2024, Shimura filed his candidacy for the congressional seat of Cebu’s 4th District under the Pwersa ng Masang Pilipino party.

=== Congressman (2025–present) ===
In the 2025 elections, Shimura defeated incumbent Representative Janice Salimbangon with 149,336 votes against Salimbangon’s 132,290. He won in Bogo, Bantayan, Daanbantayan, Madridejos, and Tabuelan, while Salimbangon prevailed in Medellin, San Remigio, Santa Fe, and Tabogon.
