= 2025 Philippine House of Representatives elections in Central Visayas =

- May 12, 2025
- All 14 Central Visayas seats in the House of Representatives
Party	Seats	+/–
Lakas	7	+6
NPC	2	−2
NUP	2	−2
LDP	1	+1
PFP	1	+1
PMP	1	+1
This lists parties that won seats. See the complete results below.

The 2025 Philippine House of Representatives elections in Central Visayas were held on May 12, 2025, as part of the 2025 Philippine general election.

== Summary ==
Congressional district	Incumbent	Incumbent's party	Winner	Winner's party	Winning margin
Bohol–1st	Edgar Chatto	NUP	John Geesnell Yap	LDP	9.13%
Bohol–2nd	Vanvan Aumentado	Lakas	Vanvan Aumentado	Lakas	57.72%
Bohol–3rd	Alexie Tutor	Lakas	Alexie Tutor	Lakas	44.46%
Cebu–1st	Rhea Gullas	Lakas	Rhea Gullas	Lakas	Unopposed
Cebu–2nd	Edsel Galeos	Lakas	Edsel Galeos	Lakas	20.96%
Cebu–3rd	Pablo John Garcia	NUP	Karen Garcia	NUP	Unopposed
Cebu–4th	Janice Salimbangon	NUP	Sun Shimura	PMP	6.00%
Cebu–5th	Duke Frasco	NUP	Duke Frasco	NUP	24.02%
Cebu–6th	Daphne Lagon	Lakas	Daphne Lagon	Lakas	Unopposed
Cebu–7th	Peter John Calderon	NPC	Patricia Calderon	NPC	24.87%
Cebu City–1st	Rachel del Mar	NPC	Rachel del Mar	NPC	9.56%
Cebu City–2nd	Eduardo Rama Jr.	Lakas	Eduardo Rama Jr.	Lakas	15.78%
Lapu-Lapu City	Cynthia Chan	Lakas	Junard Chan	PFP	44.34%
Mandaue	Emmarie Dizon	Lakas	Emmarie Dizon	Lakas	19.10%

== Bohol ==
=== 1st district ===
Incumbent Edgar Chatto of the National Unity Party ran for a third term.

Chatto was defeated by former Tagbilaran mayor John Geesnell Yap of Laban ng Demokratikong Pilipino. Two other candidates also ran for representative.

Candidate	Party	Votes	%
John Geesnell Yap	Laban ng Demokratikong Pilipino	130,661	46.84
Edgar Chatto (incumbent)	National Unity Party	105,187	37.71
Jordan Pizarras	Aksyon Demokratiko	41,841	15.00
Marybelle de la Serna	Independent	1,284	0.46
Total		278,973	100.00
Valid votes		278,973	95.89
Invalid/blank votes		11,968	4.11
Total votes		290,941	100.00
Registered voters/turnout		327,862	88.74
LDP gain from NUP			
Source: Commission on Elections

=== 2nd district ===
Incumbent Vanvan Aumentado of Lakas–CMD ran for a second term. She was previously affiliated with the People's Reform Party.

Aumentado won re-election against former National Irrigation Administration Regional Director for Central Visayas Modesto Membreve (Liberal Party).

Candidate	Party	Votes	%
Vanvan Aumentado (incumbent)	Lakas–CMD	187,719	78.86
Modesto Membreve	Liberal Party	50,308	21.14
Total		238,027	100.00
Valid votes		238,027	83.43
Invalid/blank votes		47,278	16.57
Total votes		285,305	100.00
Registered voters/turnout		326,937	87.27
Lakas hold			
Source: Commission on Elections

=== 3rd district ===
Incumbent Alexie Tutor of Lakas–CMD ran for a third term. She was previously affiliated with the Nacionalista Party.

Tutor won re-election against Makdo Castañares (Liberal Party).

Candidate	Party	Votes	%
Alexie Tutor (incumbent)	Lakas–CMD	184,280	72.23
Makdo Castañares	Liberal Party	70,849	27.77
Total		255,129	100.00
Valid votes		255,129	89.21
Invalid/blank votes		30,856	10.79
Total votes		285,985	100.00
Registered voters/turnout		326,765	87.52
Lakas hold			
Source: Commission on Elections

== Cebu ==
=== 1st district ===
Incumbent Rhea Gullas of Lakas–CMD won re-election for a second term unopposed. She was previously affiliated with the Nacionalista Party.

Candidate	Party	Votes	%
Rhea Gullas (incumbent)	Lakas–CMD	282,814	100.00
Total		282,814	100.00
Valid votes		282,814	66.09
Invalid/blank votes		145,140	33.91
Total votes		427,954	100.00
Registered voters/turnout		495,807	86.31
Lakas hold			
Source: Commission on Elections

=== 2nd district ===
Incumbent Edsel Galeos of Lakas–CMD ran for a second term. He was previously affiliated with PDP–Laban.

Galeos won re-election against Cebu vice governor Hilario Davide III (Independent).

Candidate	Party	Votes	%
Edsel Galeos (incumbent)	Lakas–CMD	91,984	60.48
Hilario Davide III	Independent	60,111	39.52
Total		152,095	100.00
Valid votes		152,095	93.65
Invalid/blank votes		10,318	6.35
Total votes		162,413	100.00
Registered voters/turnout		181,873	89.30
Lakas hold			
Source: Commission on Elections

=== 3rd district ===
Incumbent Pablo John Garcia of the National Unity Party (NUP) initially ran for a third term, but withdrew his candidacy on October 8, 2024.

The NUP substituted Garcia with his wife, Karen Flores-Garcia, who won the election unopposed.

Candidate	Party	Votes	%
Karen Flores-Garcia	National Unity Party	155,730	100.00
Total		155,730	100.00
Valid votes		155,730	45.88
Invalid/blank votes		183,664	54.12
Total votes		339,394	100.00
Registered voters/turnout		397,831	85.31
NUP hold			
Source: Commission on Elections

=== 4th district ===
Incumbent Janice Salimbangon of the National Unity Party ran for a third term.

Salimbangon was defeated by Daanbantayan mayor Sun Shimura of Pwersa ng Masang Pilipino. Sal Cariaga (Independent) also ran for representative.

Candidate	Party	Votes	%
Sun Shimura	Pwersa ng Masang Pilipino	149,336	52.56
Janice Salimbangon (incumbent)	National Unity Party	132,302	46.56
Sal Cariaga	Independent	2,509	0.88
Total		284,147	100.00
Valid votes		284,147	91.99
Invalid/blank votes		24,752	8.01
Total votes		308,899	100.00
Registered voters/turnout		355,168	86.97
PMP gain from NUP			
Source: Commission on Elections

=== 5th district ===
Incumbent Duke Frasco of the National Unity Party ran for a third term.

Frasco won re-election against Danao mayor Mix Durano (Independent).

Candidate	Party	Votes	%
Duke Frasco (incumbent)	National Unity Party	217,303	62.01
Mix Durano	Independent	133,102	37.99
Total		350,405	100.00
Valid votes		350,405	95.83
Invalid/blank votes		15,229	4.17
Total votes		365,634	100.00
Registered voters/turnout		419,986	87.06
NUP hold			
Source: Commission on Elections

=== 6th district ===
Incumbent Daphne Lagon of Lakas–CMD won re-election for a second term unopposed.

Candidate	Party	Votes	%
Daphne Lagon (incumbent)	Lakas–CMD	104,768	100.00
Total		104,768	100.00
Valid votes		104,768	82.00
Invalid/blank votes		22,996	18.00
Total votes		127,764	100.00
Registered voters/turnout		153,450	83.26
Lakas hold			
Source: Commission on Elections

=== 7th district ===
Incumbent Peter John Calderon of the Nationalist People's Coalition was term-limited.

The NPC nominated Calderon's wife, Patricia Calderon, who won against Maria Fema Duterte (PDP–Laban) and Lito Navarro (Independent).

Candidate	Party	Votes	%
Patricia Calderon	Nationalist People's Coalition	74,936	59.71
Maria Fema Duterte	PDP–Laban	43,725	34.84
Lito Navarro	Independent	6,829	5.44
Total		125,490	100.00
Valid votes		125,490	84.17
Invalid/blank votes		23,603	15.83
Total votes		149,093	100.00
Registered voters/turnout		168,055	88.72
NPC hold			
Source: Commission on Elections

== Cebu City ==
=== 1st district ===
Incumbent Rachel del Mar of the Nationalist People's Coalition ran for a second term.

Del Mar won re-election against Cebu City Liga ng mga Barangay president Franklyn Ong (Laban ng Demokratikong Pilipino), city councilor Mary Ann de los Santos (Liberal Party) and Bert Lerios (Independent).

Candidate	Party	Votes	%
Rachel del Mar (incumbent)	Nationalist People's Coalition	105,581	42.26
Franklyn Ong	Laban ng Demokratikong Pilipino	81,705	32.70
Mary Ann de los Santos	Liberal Party	60,282	24.13
Bert Lerios	Independent	2,257	0.90
Total		249,825	100.00
Valid votes		249,825	93.08
Invalid/blank votes		18,581	6.92
Total votes		268,406	100.00
Registered voters/turnout		326,007	82.33
NPC hold			
Source: Commission on Elections

=== 2nd district ===
Incumbent Eduardo Rama Jr. of BARUG and Lakas–CMD ran for a second term, winning re-election against former representative Rodrigo Abellanosa (Independent).

Candidate	Party	Votes	%
Eduardo Rama Jr. (Incumbent)	Lakas–CMD	181,055	57.89
Rodrigo Abellanosa	Independent	131,723	42.11
Total		312,778	100.00
Valid votes		312,778	91.62
Invalid/blank votes		28,605	8.38
Total votes		341,383	100.00
Registered voters/turnout		395,462	86.33
Lakas hold			
Source: Commission on Elections

== Lapu-Lapu City ==
Incumbent Cynthia Chan of Lakas–CMD retired to run for mayor of Lapu-Lapu City. She was previously affiliated with PDP–Laban.

Chan endorsed her husband, Lapu-Lapu City mayor Junard Chan (Partido Federal ng Pilipinas), who won the election against Ryan Yuson (PDP–Laban).

Candidate	Party	Votes	%
Junard Chan	Partido Federal ng Pilipinas	160,447	72.17
Ryan Yuson	PDP–Laban	61,856	27.83
Total		222,303	100.00
Valid votes		222,303	94.07
Invalid/blank votes		14,014	5.93
Total votes		236,317	100.00
Registered voters/turnout		277,288	85.22
PFP gain from Lakas			
Source: Commission on Elections

== Mandaue ==
Incumbent Emmarie Dizon of Lakas–CMD ran for a third term. She was previously affiliated with PDP–Laban.

Dizon won re-election against Regal Oliva (Aksyon Demokratiko).

Candidate	Party	Votes	%
Emmarie Dizon (incumbent)	Lakas–CMD	117,107	59.55
Regal Oliva	Aksyon Demokratiko	79,548	40.45
Total		196,655	100.00
Valid votes		196,655	94.73
Invalid/blank votes		10,943	5.27
Total votes		207,598	100.00
Registered voters/turnout		236,853	87.65
Lakas hold			
Source: Commission on Elections
