= Sogod =

Sogod may refer to:

- Sogod, Cebu, Philippines
- Sogod, Southern Leyte, Philippines
