= 2022 Philippine House of Representatives elections in Central Visayas =

- May 9, 2022
- All 18 Central Visayas seats in the House of Representatives
Party	Seats	+/–
PDP–Laban	5	+1
NUP	4	+3
NPC	4	0
Nacionalista	2	0
Lakas	1	−1
Liberal	1	−2
PRP	1	New
This lists parties that won seats. See the complete results below.

The 2022 Philippine House of Representatives elections in Central Visayas were held on May 9, 2022.

== Summary ==
Congressional district	Incumbent	Incumbent's party	Winner	Winner's party	Winning margin
Bohol–1st	Edgar Chatto	NUP	Edgar Chatto	NUP	54.77%
Bohol–2nd	Aris Aumentado	NPC	Vanvan Aumentado	PRP	18.73%
Bohol–3rd	Alexie Tutor	Nacionalista	Alexie Tutor	Nacionalista	30.57%
Cebu–1st	Eduardo Gullas	Nacionalista	Rhea Gullas	Nacionalista	Unopposed
Cebu–2nd	Wilfredo Caminero	NUP	Edsel Galeos	PDP–Laban	4.33%
Cebu–3rd	Pablo John Garcia	NUP	Pablo John Garcia	NUP	Unopposed
Cebu–4th	Janice Salimbangon	NUP	Janice Salimbangon	NUP	23.08%
Cebu–5th	Duke Frasco	NUP	Duke Frasco	NUP	34.36%
Cebu–6th	Emmarie Dizon	PDP–Laban	Daphne Lagon	Lakas	55.56%
Cebu–7th	Peter John Calderon	NPC	Peter John Calderon	NPC	Unopposed
Cebu City–1st	Vacant		Rachel del Mar	NPC	20.77%
Cebu City–2nd	Rodrigo Abellanosa	LDP	Eduardo Rama Jr.	PDP–Laban	8.86%
Lapu-Lapu City	Paz Radaza	Lakas	Cynthia Chan	PDP–Laban	54.65%
Mandaue	New seat		Emmarie Dizon	PDP–Laban	Unopposed
Negros Oriental–1st	Jocelyn Sy-Limkaichong	Liberal	Jocelyn Sy-Limkaichong	Liberal	Unopposed
Negros Oriental–2nd	Chiquiting Sagarbarria	NPC	Chiquiting Sagarbarria	NPC	21.36%
Negros Oriental–3rd	Arnie Teves	NPC	Arnie Teves	NPC	2.03%
Siquijor	Jake Vincent Villa	NPC	Zaldy Villa	PDP–Laban	11.51%

== Bohol ==
=== 1st district ===
Incumbent Edgar Chatto of the National Unity Party ran for a second term. He was previously affiliated with the Liberal Party.

Chatto won re-election against two other candidates.

Candidate	Party	Votes	%
Edgar Chatto (incumbent)	National Unity Party	160,647	70.95
Fabio Ontong Jr.	Nationalist People's Coalition	36,638	16.18
Marybelle de la Serna	Independent	29,153	12.87
Total		226,438	100.00
Total votes		280,232	–
Registered voters/turnout		316,471	88.55
NUP hold			
Source: Commission on Elections

=== 2nd district ===
Term-limited incumbent Aris Aumentado of the Nationalist People's Coalition ran for governor of Bohol.

Aumentado endorsed his wife, Vanvan Aumentado (People's Reform Party), who won the election against former provincial board member Jaja Jumamoy (National Unity Party) and three other candidates.

Candidate	Party	Votes	%
Vanvan Aumentado	People's Reform Party	138,266	56.89
Jaja Jumamoy	National Unity Party	92,728	38.16
Gerry Garcia	Pwersa ng Masang Pilipino	10,642	4.38
Ramil Melencion	Lakas–CMD	828	0.34
Marc Auza	Independent	558	0.23
Total		243,022	100.00
Total votes		275,219	–
Registered voters/turnout		312,534	88.06
PRP gain from NPC			
Source: Commission on Elections

=== 3rd district ===
Incumbent Alexie Tutor of the Nacionalista Party ran for a second term.

Tutor won re-election against Valencia mayor Kat-kat Lim (PDP–Laban) and Roger Cadorniga (Workers' and Peasants' Party).

Candidate	Party	Votes	%
Alexie Tutor (incumbent)	Nacionalista Party	167,359	65.03
Kat-kat Lim	PDP–Laban	88,686	34.46
Roger Cadorniga	Workers' and Peasants' Party	1,326	0.52
Total		257,371	100.00
Total votes		282,019	–
Registered voters/turnout		320,786	87.91
Nacionalista hold			
Source: Commission on Elections

== Cebu ==
=== 1st district ===
Incumbent Eduardo Gullas of the Nacionalista Party retired.

The Nacionalista Party nominated Gullas' granddaughter-in-law, Rhea Gullas, who won the election unopposed.

Candidate	Party	Votes	%
Rhea Gullas	Nacionalista Party	288,131	100.00
Total		288,131	100.00
Total votes		415,606	–
Registered voters/turnout		470,692	88.30
Nacionalista hold			
Source: Commission on Elections

=== 2nd district ===
Term-limited incumbent Wilfredo Caminero of the National Unity Party (NUP) ran for mayor of Argao.

The NUP nominated provincial board member Tata Salvador, who was defeated by provincial board member Edsel Galeos of PDP–Laban. Leony Gegremosa (Partido Federal ng Pilipinas) also ran for representative.

Candidate	Party	Votes	%
Edsel Galeos	PDP–Laban	73,122	51.73
Tata Salvador	National Unity Party	66,999	47.40
Leony Gegremosa	Partido Federal ng Pilipinas	1,236	0.87
Total		141,357	100.00
Total votes		154,257	–
Registered voters/turnout		175,265	88.01
PDP–Laban gain from NUP			
Source: Commission on Elections

=== 3rd district ===
Incumbent Pablo John Garcia of the National Unity Party won re-election for a second term unopposed. He was previously affiliated with PDP–Laban.

Candidate	Party	Votes	%
Pablo John Garcia (incumbent)	National Unity Party	201,530	100.00
Total		201,530	100.00
Total votes		334,385	–
Registered voters/turnout		383,749	87.14
NUP hold			
Source: Commission on Elections

=== 4th district ===
Incumbent Janice Salimbangon of the National Unity Party ran for a second term. She was previously affiliated with PDP–Laban.

Salimbangon won re-election against Cebu Liga ng mga Barangay president Tining Martinez (Partido Pilipino sa Pagbabago) and Sal Arapal Cariaga (Independent).

Candidate	Party	Votes	%
Janice Salimbangon (incumbent)	National Unity Party	163,913	61.13
Tining Martinez	Partido Pilipino sa Pagbabago	102,020	38.05
Sal Arapal Cariaga	Independent	2,223	0.83
Total		268,156	100.00
Total votes		303,689	–
Registered voters/turnout		345,099	88.00
NUP hold			
Source: Commission on Elections

=== 5th district ===
Incumbent Duke Frasco of the National Unity Party ran for a second term. He was previously affiliated with Lakas–CMD.

Frasco won re-election against former representative Ramon Durano VI (Partido Pilipino sa Pagbabago).

Candidate	Party	Votes	%
Duke Frasco (incumbent)	National Unity Party	222,288	67.18
Ramon Durano VI	Partido Pilipino sa Pagbabago	108,596	32.82
Total		330,884	100.00
Total votes		352,260	–
Registered voters/turnout		397,223	88.68
NUP hold			
Source: Commission on Elections

=== 6th district ===
As a result of Cebu's and Mandaue's redistricting in 2019, the highly urbanized city of Mandaue was separated from the district to create its own district.

Incumbent Emmarie Dizon of PDP–Laban ran for a second term in Mandaue's lone district.

Daphne Lagon (Lakas–CMD) won the election against four other candidates.

Candidate	Party	Votes	%
Daphne Lagon	Lakas–CMD	82,443	74.80
Martin Addy Sitoy	Partido Pilipino sa Pagbabago	21,210	19.24
Junjie Sitoy	Independent	5,493	4.98
Ruben Talaboc	PROMDI	643	0.58
Jay Medrozo	Independent	425	0.39
Total		110,214	100.00
Total votes		316,281	–
Registered voters/turnout		375,216	84.29
Lakas gain from PDP–Laban			
Source: Commission on Elections

=== 7th district ===
Incumbent Peter John Calderon of the Nationalist People's Coalition won re-election for a second term unopposed.

Candidate	Party	Votes	%
Peter John Calderon (incumbent)	Nationalist People's Coalition	94,715	100.00
Total		94,715	100.00
Total votes		144,832	–
Registered voters/turnout		163,095	88.80
NPC hold			
Source: Commission on Elections

== Cebu City ==
=== 1st district ===
The seat was vacant after Raul del Mar of the Liberal Party died on November 16, 2020.

Del Mar's daughter, former representative Rachel del Mar (Nationalist People's Coalition), won the election against city councilor Niña Mabatid (PDP–Laban), actor Richard Yap (National Unity Party), former city councilor Avenescio Piramide (Lakas–CMD) and Manny Momongan (Independent).

Candidate	Party	Votes	%
Rachel del Mar	Nationalist People's Coalition	117,512	45.99
Niña Mabatid	PDP–Laban	64,447	25.22
Richard Yap	National Unity Party	52,982	20.74
Avenescio Piramide	Lakas–CMD	18,627	7.29
Manny Momongan	Independent	1,929	0.75
Total		255,497	100.00
Total votes		275,578	–
Registered voters/turnout		337,089	81.75
NPC gain from Liberal			
Source: Commission on Elections

=== 2nd district ===
Incumbent Rodrigo Abellanosa of Laban ng Demokratikong Pilipino (LDP) was term-limited.

The LDP nominated Abellanosa's son, BG Rodrigo Abellanosa, who was defeated by former city councilor Eduardo Rama Jr. of PDP–Laban.

Candidate	Party	Votes	%
Eduardo Rama Jr.	PDP–Laban	168,476	54.43
BG Rodrigo Abellanosa	Laban ng Demokratikong Pilipino	141,076	45.57
Total		309,552	100.00
Total votes		338,875	–
Registered voters/turnout		395,955	85.58
PDP–Laban gain from LDP			
Source: Commission on Elections

== Lapu-Lapu City ==
Incumbent Paz Radaza of Lakas–CMD ran for mayor of Lapu-Lapu City.

Lakas–CMD nominated city councilor Michael Dignos, who was defeated by Cynthia Chan of PDP–Laban. Four other candidates also ran for representative.

Candidate	Party	Votes	%
Cynthia Chan	PDP–Laban	147,631	74.17
Michael Dignos	Lakas–CMD	38,844	19.52
Manuel Degollacion Jr.	Pederalismo ng Dugong Dakilang Samahan	6,929	3.48
Chezie Demegillo	Liberal Party	3,283	1.65
Genaro Tampus	Independent	1,562	0.78
Junex Doronio	Partido Lakas ng Masa	796	0.40
Total		199,045	100.00
Total votes		217,085	–
Registered voters/turnout		245,395	88.46
PDP–Laban gain from Lakas			
Source: Commission on Elections

== Mandaue ==
As a result of Mandaue's redistricting in 2019, the city was separated from Cebu's 6th district to create its own district.

Emmarie Dizon of PDP–Laban, incumbent representative of Cebu's 6th district, won re-election for a second term unopposed in this district.

Candidate	Party	Votes	%
Emmarie Dizon	PDP–Laban	153,004	100.00
Total		153,004	100.00
Total votes		197,924	–
Registered voters/turnout		234,581	84.37
PDP–Laban hold			
Source: Commission on Elections

== Negros Oriental ==
=== 1st district ===
Incumbent Jocelyn Sy-Limkaichong of the Liberal Party won re-election for a third term unopposed.

Candidate	Party	Votes	%
Jocelyn Sy-Limkaichong (incumbent)	Liberal Party	143,849	100.00
Total		143,849	100.00
Total votes		237,082	–
Registered voters/turnout		276,286	85.81
Liberal hold			
Source: Commission on Elections

=== 2nd district ===
Incumbent Chiquiting Sagarbarria of the Nationalist People's Coalition ran for a third term.

Sagarbarria won re-election against former Negros Oriental governor George Arnaiz (Lakas–CMD).

Candidate	Party	Votes	%
Chiquiting Sagarbarria (incumbent)	Nationalist People's Coalition	160,262	60.68
George Arnaiz	Lakas–CMD	103,848	39.32
Total		264,110	100.00
Total votes		312,507	–
Registered voters/turnout		364,529	85.73
NPC hold			
Source: Commission on Elections

=== 3rd district ===
Incumbent Arnie Teves of the Nationalist People's Coalition ran for a third term. He was previously affiliated with PDP–Laban.

Teves won re-election against four other candidates.

Candidate	Party	Votes	%
Arnie Teves (incumbent)	Nationalist People's Coalition	91,482	48.99
Rey Lopez	Nacionalista Party	87,684	46.96
Karen Estrella	PROMDI	4,779	2.56
Acel Estrella	Independent	2,779	1.49
Total		186,724	100.00
Total votes		244,703	–
Registered voters/turnout		291,224	84.03
NPC hold			
Source: Commission on Elections

== Siquijor ==
Incumbent Jake Vincent Villa of the Nationalist People's Coalition ran for governor of Siquijor.

Villa endorsed his father, Siquijor governor Zaldy Villa (PDP–Laban), who won the election against former Siquijor governor Orlando Fua Jr. (Aksyon Demokratiko) and two other candidates.

Candidate	Party	Votes	%
Zaldy Villa	PDP–Laban	33,989	54.08
Orlando Fua Jr.	Aksyon Demokratiko	26,722	42.52
Guido Ganhinhin	Independent	1,660	2.64
Joy Lopes de Andrade	Independent	474	0.75
Total		62,845	100.00
Total votes		69,103	–
Registered voters/turnout		78,458	88.08
PDP–Laban gain from NPC			
Source: Commission on Elections
