= Madridejos, Cebu =

Municipality in Cebu, Philippines

Madridejos Lawis
- Municipality
- Municipality of Madridejos
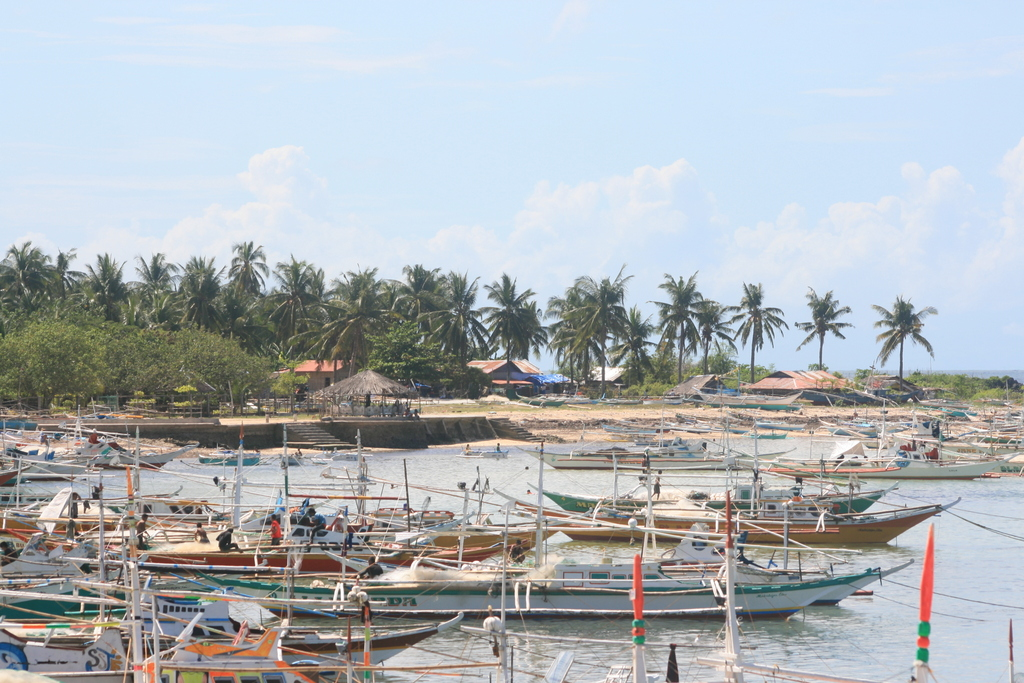
- Fishing boats at Madridejos

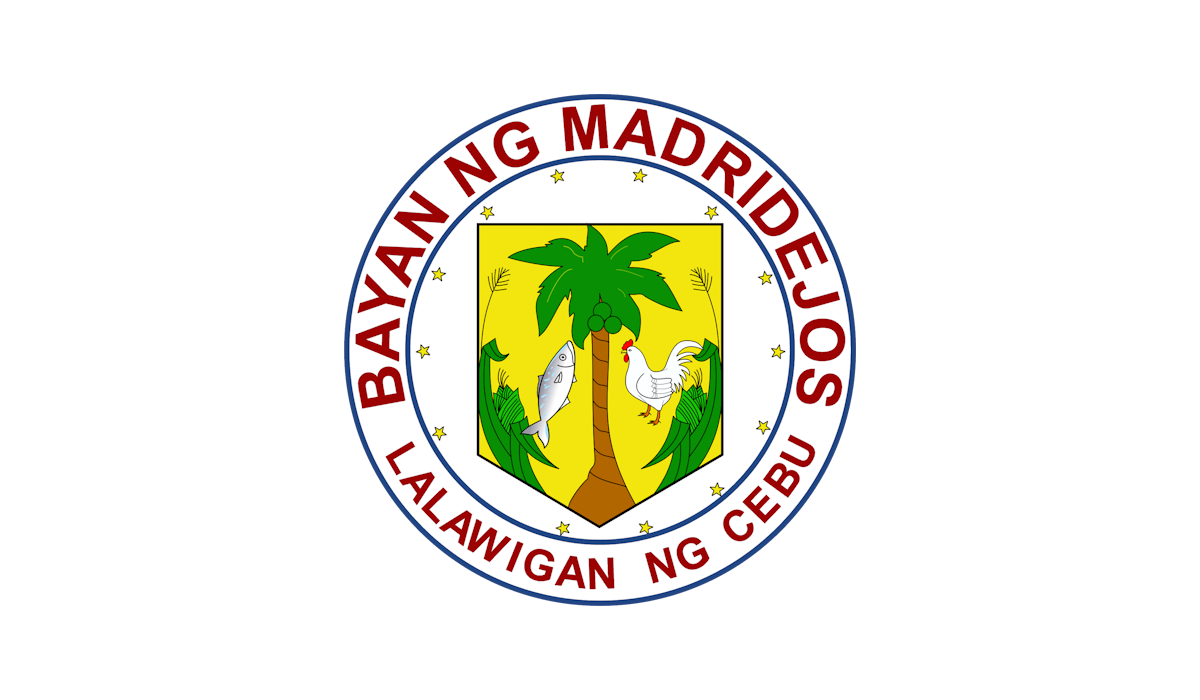
- Flag Seal

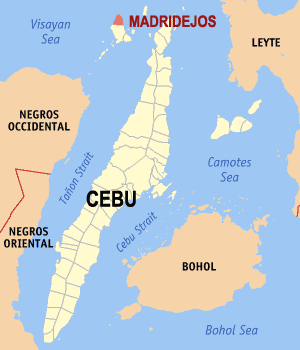
- Map of Cebu with Madridejos highlighted
- Interactive map of Madridejos
- Location within the Philippines
- Coordinates: 11°16′N 123°44′E
- Country: Philippines
- Region: Central Visayas
- Province: Cebu
- District: 4th district
- Founded: 2 January 1917
- Barangays: 14 (see Barangays)

Government
  - Type: Sangguniang Bayan
  - Mayor: Romeo A. Villaceran (1Cebu)
  - Vice Mayor: Vincent Y. Villacrucis (1Cebu)
  - Representative: Sun J. Shimura (PMP)
  - Municipal Council: Members: Stephen C. Olingay; Venice Cyrus M. Rebadomia; Perla A. Bacayo; Julius Villaceran; Perla B. Molina; Owen G. Daruca; Delfin V. Santillan; Villamor M. Batayola II
  - Electorate: 30,868 voters (2025)

Area
  - Total: 23.95 km^{2} (9.25 sq mi)
- Elevation: 2.0 m (6.6 ft)
- Highest elevation: 35 m (115 ft)
- Lowest elevation: 0 m (0 ft)

Population (2024 census)
  - Total: 42,828
  - Density: 1,788/km^{2} (4,631/sq mi)
  - Households: 10,046
- Demonym: Lawisanon

Economy
  - Income class: 1st municipal income class
  - Poverty incidence: 26.81% (2023)
  - Revenue: ₱ 262 million (2024)
  - Assets: ₱ 764.9 million (2024)
  - Expenditure: ₱ 285.8 million (2024)
  - Liabilities: ₱ 351.3 million (2024)

Service provider
  - Electricity: Bantayan Island Electric Cooperative (BANELCO)
- Time zone: UTC+8 (PST)
- ZIP code: 6053
- PSGC: 072228000
- IDD : area code: +63 (0)32
- Native languages: Cebuano; Tagalog

Madridejos, officially the Municipality of Madridejos (Cebuano: Lungsod sa Madridejos; Tagalog: Bayan ng Madridejos), is a municipality in the province of Cebu, Philippines. According to the 2024 census, it has a population of 42,828 people.

There is a light station – LS Madridejos – about 50 metres (160 ft) north of the mean highwater mark at Kota point .

== History ==
Lawis was the old name of Madridejos. Even today people still use the name "Lawis", meaning "promontory", the portion carved out to constitute the municipality of Madridejos being the peninsula located on the northern side of Bantayan island facing the Visayan Sea.

During the time of governor Sebastián Hurtado de Corcuera (1635–1644), the Visayas were continually harassed by the Moros, who wreaked dreadful havoc, capturing, massacring, robbing, sacking churches, and burning everything there was.

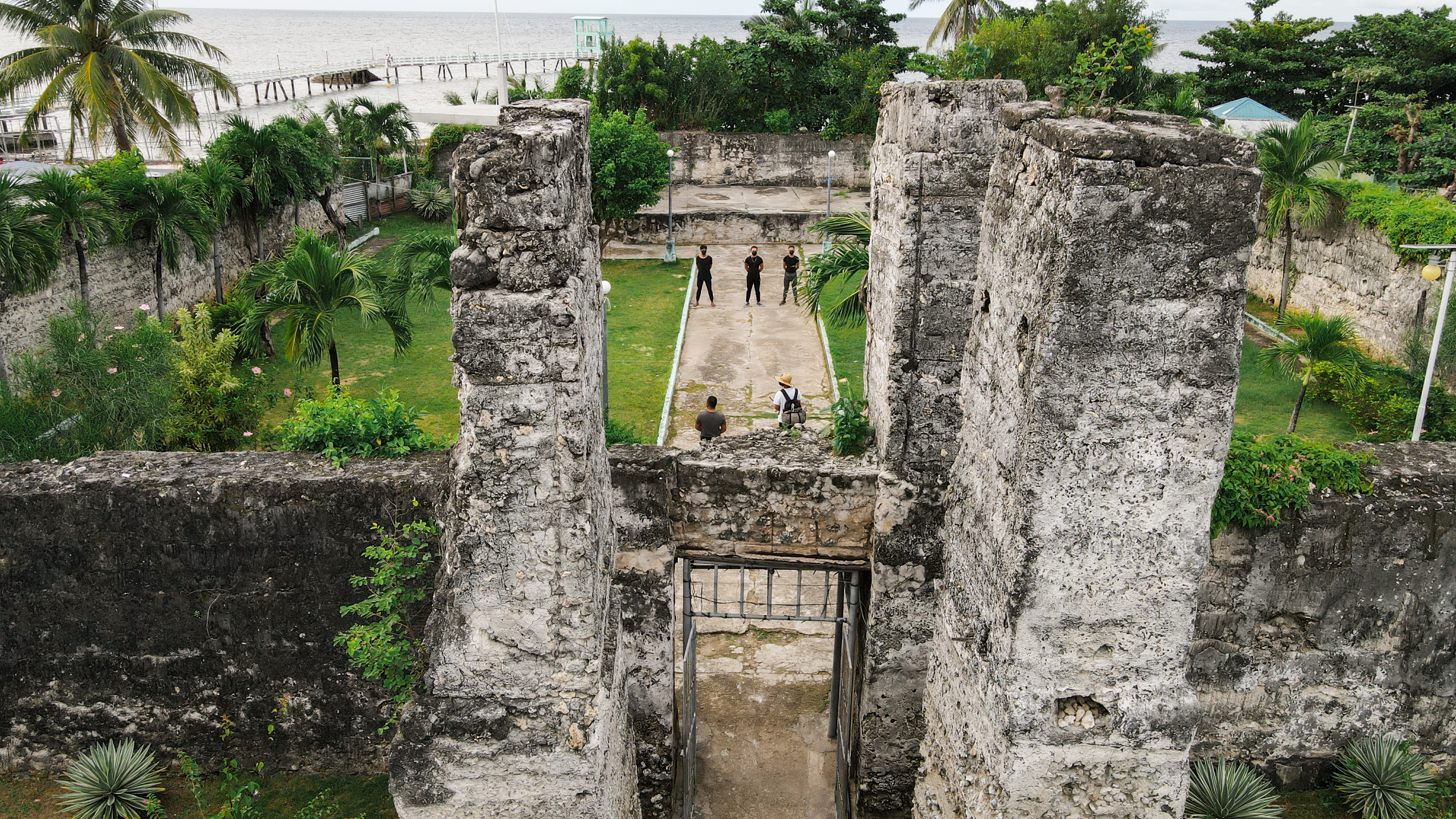
The ruins of the fort built in 1630

The kota (cota or cuta = fort) also built in 1630. Blowing of the budyong (Note: horn – could be a conch shell or the horn of a carabao) served as signal of the coming of the Moros. A watch tower was built in Kaongkod, a barrio about 4 kilometres (2.5 mi) from the fort. It is the place from where the approach of the Moros could easily be seen, to give a timely warning to the townsfolk of their coming. All watchtowers on Bantayan were built by Fr. Doroteo Andrada del Rosario, parish priest of Bantayan in the 19th century (Moro attacks were worst around 1840s).

The general scenery of Lawis was that of a quiet place, of virgin grounds covered by small shrubs and lantana. When more people discovered Lawis and flocked to it, the place became a visita.

In 1917 the pueblo Lawis became a municipality named Madridejos. This was the name given to the third town of Bantayan island in honour of Benito Romero de Madridejos the former archbishop of Cebu. (Note: Benito Romero O.F.M. (appointed 28 January 1876 - died 4 November 1885)) The town's feast day is celebrated annually on 8 December.

=== Immaculate Conception parish church ===
In the year 1600s, before Madridejos was made into a town, there was a barrio called Lawis at the tip of Bantayan island. In this barrio was a chapel built by the Augustinians who also built the parish church of Bantayan in the year 1580. (Note: Thanks to: Rev. Fr. Cristobal Garcia at the Cebu Metropolitan Cathedral, to whom this written history was submitted, as required by the Archdiocese of Cebu, on the occasion of the solemn processional of the thirty nine (39) images with the titles of "La Virgin Purisima" joining the said procession of the International Marian Year.)

The chapel was located within the Spanish fort near the seashore. Inside the chapel, there was a framed picture of Our Lady of the Immaculate Conception which was the object of devotion and before which the Holy Rosary was prayed every afternoon. Once a month and during church feasts, the chapel was visited by the priest of Bantayan to say mass and celebrate its annual feast.

In the 1700s there was an image of La Virgen Purisima carved in the Island from batikuling wood. It was 16 inches (41 centimetres) tall and was placed on the altar of the first chapel built by the Augustinian priests near the seashore of barrio Lawis. Folklore say there would be times when the clothes of the image were wet and damp although there was no rain, and was full of amorseko (crab grass) (Note: Formal description at Kew,description with photographs) – a kind of weed in the fields. During the time of the El Tor epidemic a beautiful lady was observed ministering to the sick mountain folks.

Since olden times, every October the Virgin is brought in a fluvial [sic] procession and the Holy Rosary is prayed. The feast was celebrated every eight day of December, until Lawis became a parish in the year 1928.

=== Second World War ===
- 1942 - occupation by Japanese Imperial forces.
- 1945 - liberation by the Philippine Commonwealth troops of the 3rd, 8th, 82nd & 83rd Infantry Divisions of the Philippine Commonwealth Army which landed in Madridejos at the front of battles against Japanese forces in the Battle of Bantayan. The built of the general headquarters of the Philippine Commonwealth Army was stationed in Madridejos and active from 1945 to 1946 during and after the war.

== Geography ==
Madridejos is one of the three municipalities that make up the island of Bantayan, which lies to the west of the northern tip of Cebu. Madridejos is bordered to the north and west by the Visayan Sea, to the east is the town of Daanbantayan and to the south is the town of Bantayan.

=== Barangays ===
Madridejos is politically subdivided into 14 barangays. Each barangay consists of puroks and some have sitios.

PSGC	Barangay	Population			±% p.a.	
		2024		2010		
072228001	Bunakan	4.4%	1,888	1,870	▴	0.07%
072228002	Kangwayan	2.5%	1,083	1,071	▴	0.08%
072228003	Kaongkod	8.1%	3,454	3,088	▴	0.78%
072228004	Kodia	4.8%	2,077	2,071	▴	0.02%
072228005	Maalat	5.2%	2,212	2,042	▴	0.56%
072228006	Malbago	6.1%	2,593	2,583	▴	0.03%
072228007	Mancilang	11.5%	4,934	4,662	▴	0.39%
072228009	Pili	5.7%	2,449	2,153	▴	0.90%
072228010	Poblacion	8.2%	3,509	3,768	▾	−0.49%
072228011	San Agustin	5.6%	2,399	2,201	▴	0.60%
072228012	Tabagak	4.5%	1,919	1,874	▴	0.16%
072228013	Talangnan	7.7%	3,294	3,645	▾	−0.70%
072228014	Tarong	6.7%	2,879	2,212	▴	1.85%
072228015	Tugas	4.1%	1,739	1,665	▴	0.30%
	Total		42,828	34,905	▴	1.43%

=== Climate ===
Climate data for Madridejos, Cebu
Month	Jan	Feb	Mar	Apr	May	Jun	Jul	Aug	Sep	Oct	Nov	Dec	Year
Mean daily maximum °C (°F)	29 (84)	29 (84)	31 (88)	32 (90)	32 (90)	31 (88)	30 (86)	30 (86)	30 (86)	30 (86)	29 (84)	29 (84)	30 (86)
Mean daily minimum °C (°F)	23 (73)	22 (72)	23 (73)	24 (75)	25 (77)	25 (77)	24 (75)	24 (75)	25 (77)	24 (75)	24 (75)	23 (73)	24 (75)
Average precipitation mm (inches)	39 (1.5)	34 (1.3)	42 (1.7)	36 (1.4)	73 (2.9)	109 (4.3)	118 (4.6)	108 (4.3)	129 (5.1)	136 (5.4)	112 (4.4)	89 (3.5)	1,025 (40.4)
Average rainy days	12.6	9.7	12.0	13.0	20.5	25.3	26.2	24.8	25.2	25.9	21.9	17.9	235
Source: Meteoblue (modeled/calculated data, not measured locally)

== Demographics ==
Population of Madridejos, Cebu

Year	Pop.	±% p.a.
1903	3,127	—
1918	3,678	+1.09%
1939	8,647	+4.15%
1948	14,547	+5.95%
1960	14,686	+0.08%
1970	16,813	+1.36%
1975	18,789	+2.25%
1980	18,865	+0.08%

Year	Pop.	±% p.a.
1990	25,746	+3.16%
1995	26,506	+0.55%
2000	29,020	+1.96%
2007	30,673	+0.77%
2010	34,905	+4.82%
2015	36,429	+0.82%
2020	42,039	+3.06%
2024	42,828	+0.45%

Source: Philippine Statistics Authority

== Economy ==
Poverty incidence of Madridejos (%)

Source: Philippine Statistics Authority

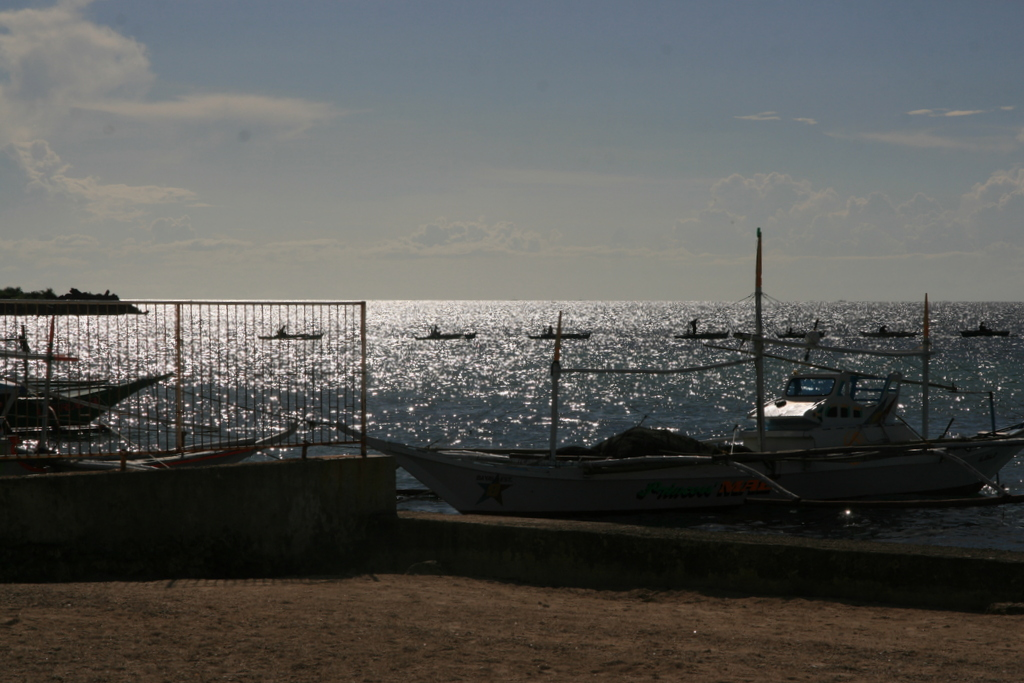
Fishing fleet leaving Madridejos, early evening.

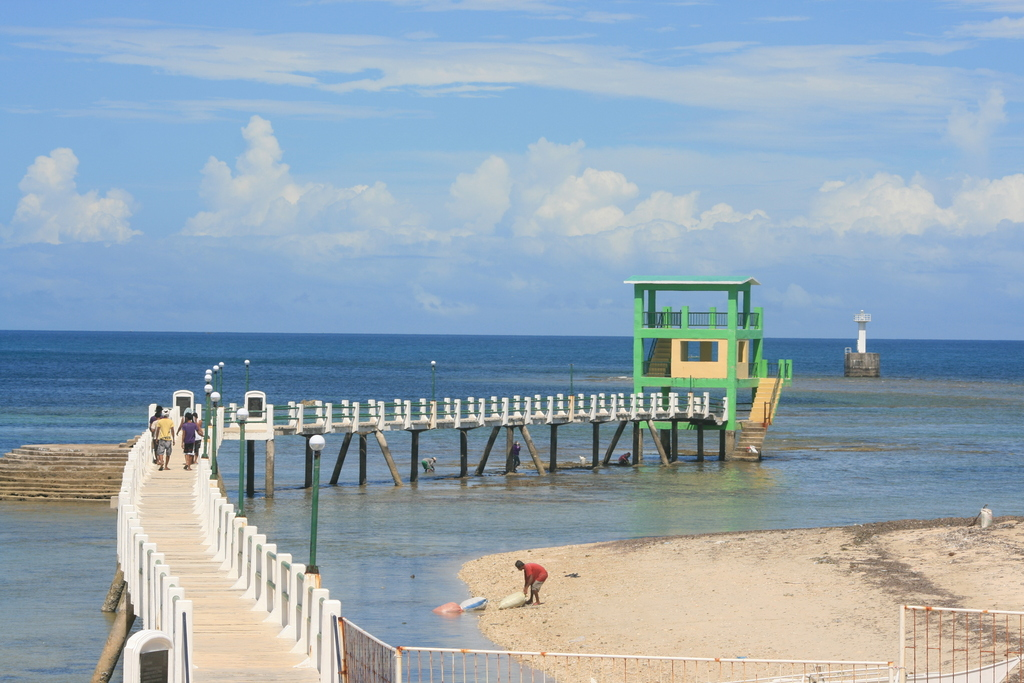
Beach and walkway at Kota Point, with the light station visible past the end of the walkway.

The main industries of Madridejos are fishing, poultry and tourism.

Because of its rich fishing grounds, Madridejos earned the name of "Little Alaska of the Philippines": the first canning factory in the country was established here, but it lost its sustaining impact in the history of the municipality after it was bombed during World War II. At present, poultry-raising is a growing industry and Madridejos provides a substantial quantity of eggs produced for sale to the neighboring provinces.

Madridejos also hosts a fairly substantial tertiary college – Salazar College.

== Transportation ==
Madridejos can be reached by boat from Cebu City via Santa Fe with 75-minutes ferry service to San Remigio (Hagnaya) via Island Shipping or SuperShuttle Ferry and also via Ceres bus from North Bus Terminal to Madridejos and vice versa. Bus (jeepney) travel to Madridejos via the municipality of Bantayan takes about a further hour.

There are currently no overnight boats from Cebu City to Bantayan Island, nor are there any scheduled commercial air flights. Private air companies occasionally fly smaller Cessna and Piper aircraft into Bantayan Airport.

== Media ==
There are two radio stations:

- DYRV-FM News Patrol 99.9 MHz
- Radyo Natin DYEE-FM 102.9 MHz

== Sources ==
- Blair, Emma Helen & Robertson, James Alexander, eds. (1905). The Philippine Islands, 1493–1898. Vol. 23 of 55 (1629–1630). Historical introduction and additional notes by Edward Gaylord Bourne. Cleveland, Ohio: Arthur H. Clark Company. ISBN 978-1153716369. OCLC 769945716.
- Clayton, W Derek; Vorontsova, Maria S; Harman, Kehan T & Williamson, H (2002). "World Grass Species: Descriptions, Identification, and Information Retrieval" (Online database). GrassBase – The Online World Grass Flora. Royal Botanic Gardens, Kew. "Dallwitz (1980); and Dallwitz, Paine and Zurcher should also be cited"
- Galinato, Marita Ignacio; Moody, Keith & Piggin, Colin M (1999). Upland Rice Weeds of South and Southeast Asia (Online book). Manila: IRRI. pp. 66–67 Chrysopogon aciculatus. ISBN 978-9712201301.
- Lavilles, Gervasio L. (1965). History: Cebu's 4 cities & 49 municipalities with trimmed accounts of Christianization of the Philippines. Lavilles.
- de Medina, Fray Juan (1630) [1893]. Historia de los sucesos de la orden de n. gran P. S. Agustin de estas islas Filipinas: desde que se descubrieron y se poblaron por los españoles, con las noticias memorables / compuesta por el venerable Fray Juan de Medina [History of the Augustinian Order in the Filipinas Islands] (scan) (in Spanish). Manila: Chofréy y Comp. OCLC 11769618.
- Panublion (2003). "Region 7: Central Visayas ••• Bantayan Island". Islas de los Pintados: The Visayan Islands. JESCOM / Ateneo de Manila. Archived from the original on 11 February 2006.
- Rodríguez, Jesús & Mariblanca, David (2000). "HISTORIA - Existe otro Madridejos en Filipinas" (in Spanish). madridejos.net. Archived from the original on 5 October 2015.
- Spicer, Edward Holland (1967) [1962]. Cycles of Conquest: The Impact of Spain, Mexico, and the United States on Indians of the Southwest, 1533–1960. Tucson, Az: University of Arizona Press. ISBN 978-0816500215.
