= Isidro Kintanar =

Filipino Visayan lawyer, mayor, and congressman from Cebu, Philippines

The Honourable Isidro Kintanar
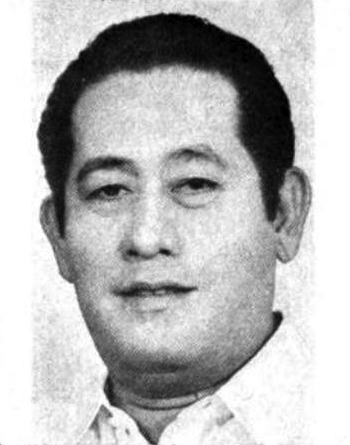

Member of the House of Representatives of the Philippines from Cebu's 4th District
- In office December 30, 1953 – April 8, 1968
- Preceded by: Filomeno Kintanar
- Succeeded by: Gaudencio Beduya

Mayor of Argao
- In office 1952–1954

Personal details
- Born: May 14, 1915 Argao, Cebu, Philippine Islands
- Died: April 8, 1968 (aged 52)
- Party: Nacionalista
- Relations: Filomeno Kintanar (brother)
- Education: Visayan Institute; University of Manila
- Profession: Lawyer

Isidro Camasura Kintanar (May 14, 1915 – April 8, 1968) was a Filipino Visayan lawyer, politician, and legislator from Cebu, Philippines. He was elected mayor of the municipality of Argao (1952–1954) and Member of the House of Representatives for Cebu's 4th legislative district (1953–1968).

== Early life ==
Born in Talaytay, Argao, Cebu... son of Carmiano Kintanar and Sofia Camasura, Isidro Camasura Kintanar was born in Talaytay, Argao, Cebu on May 14, 1915, and he attended Visayan Institute (now University of the Visayas) where he was involved in the school paper and the student council. Then, he took up law at the University of Manila in 1940 and became a lawyer on June 7, 1946. He married Fidele Acedero.

== Political career ==
While attending college, he supported his studies working as an employee at the Oriental Glass Palace in Cebu and as a clerk at the Bureau of Posts in Manila. Before World War II, he worked as an employee of the Cavite Navy Yard starting in 1940. After World War II, he attempted to establish a private law practice, which was unsuccessful. Later on, he became an agent of the National Bureau of Investigation starting in 1948.

In 1952, he became mayor of the municipality of Argao, Cebu. However, he was suspended by President Elpidio Quirino on April 18, 1952, following allegations of falsification of public documents. The suspension order was delivered through Cebu Governor Sergio Osmeña Jr.

Kintanar was affiliated with the Nacionalista Party. Succeeding his brother Filomeno Kintanar who declined to campaign for another term, he was elected member of the Congress of the Republic representing Cebu's 4th district in 1954 and served for four consecutive terms until 1968. He participated in several key House committees of ways and means, reorganization, judiciary, government enterprises, anti-Filipino activities, and fishing and industry. Known for his cautious approach, played a significant role... aimed at preventing redundancy and duplication of functions and duplication functions.

In 1957, he was the Philippine delegate in the Inter-Parliamentary Union Congress conducted in Nice, France. On that same year, President Carlos P. Garcia ruled on the administrative case lodged by Kintanar, Ramon Durano, and Miguel Cuenco against incumbent Governor Sergio Osmeña Jr. and Cebu Provincial Board Members Fructuoso Cabahug and Pedro Uy Calderon. The complaint claimed that the land swap between the Cebu provincial government and the real estate company Cebu Heights Co., of which Osmeña was the primary stockholder and President, was disadvantageous to the province. Garcia exonerated Osmeña, Cabahug and Calderon, and he also created a committee that would assess the fair value of the concerned properties.

While serving his last term in Congress, he died of heart attack on April 8, 1968.

== Historical commemoration ==
- Formerly known as Cebu South General Hospital, the Isidro C. Kintanar Memorial Hospital located Barangay Poblacion in the municipality of Argao, Cebu was renamed in his honor by virtue of Republic Act 5720 enacted on June 21, 1969.
- The 100-bed hospital constructed in Barangay Bogo, Argao was given the name new Isidro C. Kintanar Memorial Hospital and was inaugurated on January 30, 2018.
- The Isidro Kintanar Street in Barangay Poblacion, Argao was also named in his honor.
