= Benhur Salimbangon =

Filipino politician (1945–2020)

Member of the Philippine House of Representatives from Cebu's 4th District
- In office June 30, 2010 – June 30, 2019
- Preceded by: Celestino Martinez III
- Succeeded by: Janice Salimbangon
- In office June 30, 2007 – May 24, 2010
- Preceded by: Clavel A. Martinez
- Succeeded by: Celestino Martinez III

Member of the Cebu Provincial Board from the 4th District
- In office June 30, 1992 – June 30, 1998

Personal details
- Born: June 3, 1945
- Died: December 24, 2020 (aged 75)
- Party: NUP (2011–2020); 1CEBU (2009–2020)
- Other political affiliations: Lakas (2008–2011); KAMPI (2007–2008)
- Profession: Politician

Benhur Lago Salimbangon (June 3, 1945 – December 24, 2020) was a Filipino politician. A member of National Unity Party and the One Cebu party, Salimbangon was elected to the House of Representatives of the Philippines in 2007, representing the Fourth District of Cebu. He also served as Board Member of the Fourth District of Cebu for two terms from 1992 to 1998.

He died on 24 December 2020 aged 75.

House of Representatives of the Philippines
Preceded by Clavel Martinez	Member of the Philippine House of Representatives from 4th District of Cebu; 2007–2010	Succeeded by Celestino Martinez III
Preceded by Celestino Martinez III	Member of the Philippine House of Representatives from 4th District of Cebu; 2010–2019	Succeeded by Janice Salimbangon
