= Janice Salimbangon =

Filipino politician (born 1966)

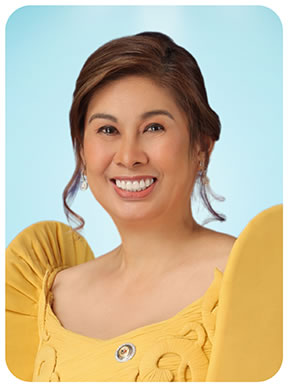
- Official portrait, 2022

Member of the Philippine House of Representatives from Cebu's 4th district
- In office June 30, 2019 – June 30, 2025
- Preceded by: Benhur L. Salimbangon
- Succeeded by: Sun J. Shimura

Personal details
- Born: May 31, 1966 (age 60) Cebu City, Cebu, Philippines
- Party: 1CEBU (2018–present); NUP (2019–present)
- Other political affiliations: PDP–Laban (2018–2019)
- Spouse: Benhur Salimbangon
- Profession: Politician

Janice Zamora Salimbangon is a Filipino politician serving as the representative for the 4th district of Cebu from 2019 to 2025. She is the widow of Benhur Salimbangon who also served as the representative of the said district.

== Political career ==
She was already presumed to succeed her husband who was on his third and final term as representative of Cebu's 4th district. On October 14, 2018, she filed her certificate of candidacy for the said position where she went against former Bogo mayor Celestino Martinez Jr. She defeated Martinez in the 2019 elections.

She is currently serving as a vice chairperson of the Committee on Aquaculture and Fisheries Resources.

Among the bills filed by Salimbangon as representative were the renaming of the Bogo-Curva-Medellin-Daanbantayan-Maya Road into Juan Macaraeg Highway, removing Bantayan Island from the wilderness protected zone category, and rationalizing the management of resources on Malapascua Island. She also voted in favor of House Bill No. 6875 which later became the Anti-Terrorism Act of 2020 saying that she is "totally against terrorism."

== Electoral history ==
Electoral history of Janice Salimbangon
Year	Office	Party		Votes received				Result	Ref.
Year	Office	Local	National	Total	%	P.	Swing	Result	Ref.
2019	Representative (Cebu–4th)	1CEBU	PDP–Laban	136,582	56.89%	1st	—N/a	Won	
2022	Representative (Cebu–4th)	1CEBU	NUP	163,913	61.13%	1st	—N/a	Won	
2025	Representative (Cebu–4th)	1CEBU	NUP	132,302	46.56%	2nd	—N/a	Lost	

== Personal life ==
Salimbangon was married to Benhur Salimbangon, who was from Medellin, Cebu, to which they had seven children. Her husband died on December 24, 2020, at the age of 75. Their daughter, Daphne, ran as vice governor in the 2019 elections but was defeated by then outgoing governor Hilario Davide III.

House of Representatives of the Philippines
Preceded by Benhur Salimbangon	Member of the Philippine House of Representatives from 4th District of Cebu; 2019–2025	Succeeded by Sun Shimura
