= Borbon, Cebu =

Municipality in Cebu, Philippines

Borbon
- Municipality
- Municipality of Borbon
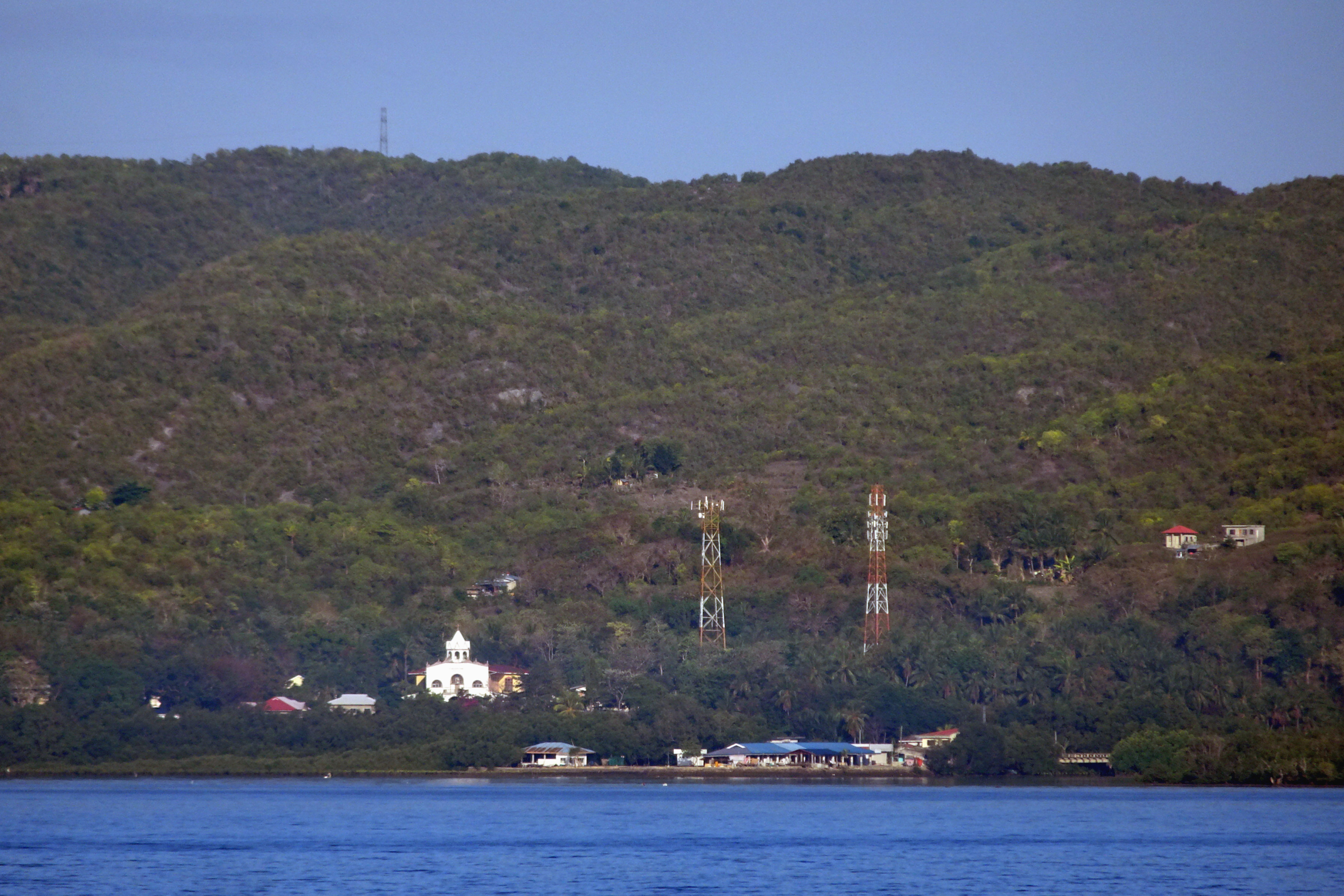
- View of Borbon

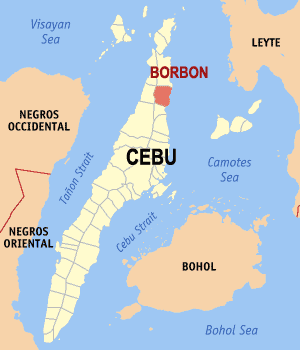
- Map of Cebu with Borbon highlighted
- Interactive map of Borbon
- Location within the Philippines
- Coordinates: 10°50′N 124°00′E
- Country: Philippines
- Region: Central Visayas
- Province: Cebu
- District: 5th district
- Founded: 15 September 1862
- Barangays: 19 (see Barangays)

Government
  - Type: Sangguniang Bayan
  - Mayor: Noel T. Dotillos
  - Vice Mayor: Roy D. Melgo
  - Representative: Vincent Franco D. Frasco
  - Municipal Council: Members: Moman D. Rivera; Abdon C. Cabahug; Bernad-Gino D. Sepulveda; Fernando Manuel G. Larrañaga; Alberto Y. Melendres; Joselito A. Antigua; Ramonito T. Dotillos; Aniceto M. Monsuller Jr.
  - Electorate: 27,275 voters (2025)

Area
  - Total: 120.94 km^{2} (46.70 sq mi)
- Elevation: 77 m (253 ft)
- Highest elevation: 292 m (958 ft)
- Lowest elevation: 0 m (0 ft)

Population (2024 census)
  - Total: 40,097
  - Density: 331.54/km^{2} (858.70/sq mi)
  - Households: 9,664

Economy
  - Income class: 2nd municipal income class
  - Poverty incidence: 25.32% (2023)
  - Revenue: ₱ 176.8 million (2024)
  - Assets: ₱ 529.8 million (2024)
  - Expenditure: ₱ 221.5 million (2024)
  - Liabilities: ₱ 82.03 million (2024)

Service provider
  - Electricity: Cebu 2 Electric Cooperative (CEBECO 2)
- Time zone: UTC+8 (PST)
- ZIP code: 6008
- PSGC: 072213000
- IDD : area code: +63 (0)32
- Native languages: Cebuano; Tagalog

Borbon, officially the Municipality of Borbon (Cebuano: Lungsod sa Borbon; Tagalog: Bayan ng Borbon), is a municipality in the province of Cebu, Philippines. According to the 2024 census, it has a population of 40,097 people.

== History ==
According to the Panublion publication, Borbon was established as a parish on 15 September 1862 and had San Sebastian as its patron saint. Today St. Sebastian's fiesta is celebrated every 20 January. Borbon was formerly a visita or an extension community of the town of Sogod. That is why many of the first settlers of Borbon were families whose roots can be traced back to relatives in Sogod.

In addition, Redondo 1886, p. 163 describes the Borbon church made of wood and tabique resting on a base of mortar, dimensions 22 1/2 by 7 1/2 fathoms (41 m × 14 m; 135 ft × 45 ft). The church was thatched with grass. The original church is believed to have been one of the oldest churches in Cebu prior to its demolition after World War II.

The town was said to have been named after the Spanish House of Bourbon, or a misinterpretation of the Cebuano term "Bonbon" which means pebbly sand, but the generally accepted history of its name is of legend.

== Geography ==
Borbon is bordered on the north by the town of Tabogon, to the west by the town of Tabuelan, on the east by the Camotes Sea, and on the south by the town of Sogod.

=== Silmugi River ===
Silmugi River is an eco-tourism site in northern Cebu. Located between the barangays of Poblacion and Cadaruhan, the river stretches for about 12 kilometres (7.5 mi) between barangays Vito and Suba. It is where the rainwater from the many mountain barangays cascades and discharges into the sea.

The river played a big part during Borbon's formation as a town because in the past the river was known to be so big and wide that many boats traveled it.

=== Barangays ===
Borbon is politically subdivided into 19 barangays. Each barangay consists of puroks and some have sitios.

PSGC	Barangay	Population			±% p.a.	
		2024		2010		
072213001	Bagacay	1.4%	576	645	▾	−0.78%
072213002	Bili	1.9%	768	546	▴	2.40%
072213003	Bingay	3.0%	1,220	1,084	▴	0.83%
072213004	Bongdo	3.5%	1,389	1,253	▴	0.72%
072213005	Bongdo Gua	2.2%	893	865	▴	0.22%
072213006	Bongoyan	4.1%	1,652	1,457	▴	0.88%
072213007	Cadaruhan	10.7%	4,274	3,639	▴	1.12%
072213008	Cajel	3.5%	1,401	1,162	▴	1.31%
072213009	Campusong	5.8%	2,344	2,147	▴	0.61%
072213010	Clavera	3.5%	1,410	1,245	▴	0.87%
072213011	Don Gregorio Antigua (Taytayan)	9.1%	3,631	3,086	▴	1.14%
072213012	Laaw	3.9%	1,544	1,484	▴	0.28%
072213013	Lugo	7.7%	3,093	3,067	▴	0.06%
072213014	Managase	3.5%	1,395	1,388	▴	0.03%
072213015	Poblacion	12.7%	5,090	4,258	▴	1.25%
072213016	Sagay	3.1%	1,255	1,025	▴	1.42%
072213017	San Jose	1.9%	749	664	▴	0.84%
072213018	Tabunan	4.3%	1,705	1,698	▴	0.03%
072213019	Tagnucan	2.8%	1,137	885	▴	1.76%
	Total		40,097	31,598	▴	1.67%

=== Climate ===
Climate data for Borbon, Cebu
Month	Jan	Feb	Mar	Apr	May	Jun	Jul	Aug	Sep	Oct	Nov	Dec	Year
Mean daily maximum °C (°F)	28 (82)	29 (84)	30 (86)	31 (88)	31 (88)	30 (86)	30 (86)	30 (86)	30 (86)	29 (84)	29 (84)	28 (82)	30 (85)
Mean daily minimum °C (°F)	23 (73)	23 (73)	23 (73)	24 (75)	25 (77)	25 (77)	25 (77)	25 (77)	25 (77)	25 (77)	24 (75)	23 (73)	24 (75)
Average precipitation mm (inches)	70 (2.8)	49 (1.9)	62 (2.4)	78 (3.1)	138 (5.4)	201 (7.9)	192 (7.6)	185 (7.3)	192 (7.6)	205 (8.1)	156 (6.1)	111 (4.4)	1,639 (64.6)
Average rainy days	13.4	10.6	13.1	14.5	24.2	27.9	28.4	27.7	27.1	27.4	22.5	15.9	252.7
Source: Meteoblue

== Demographics ==
Population census of Borbon
Year	Pop.	±% p.a.
1903	5,242	—
1918	9,756	+4.23%
1939	16,680	+2.59%
1948	18,333	+1.06%
1960	18,755	+0.19%
1970	18,123	−0.34%
1975	18,664	+0.59%
1980	20,137	+1.53%
1990	23,239	+1.44%
1995	26,020	+2.14%
2000	28,571	+2.03%
2007	32,278	+1.70%
2010	31,598	−0.77%
2015	35,526	+2.26%
2020	38,187	+1.53%
2024	40,097	+1.18%
Source: Philippine Statistics Authority

== Economy ==
Poverty incidence of Borbon (%)

Source: Philippine Statistics Authority

Source of livelihood:

- Farming- this source of livelihood generally dominates in Borbon. It includes crop, livestock, forest, rented out land, agriculture, farm machinery, vegetable and fodder.
- Fishing

== Culture ==
=== Silmugi Festival ===
- Silmugi Festival is a celebration to honor the patron saint, St. Sebastian the Martyr. The highlight of this event is the street dancing which involves a traditional prayer for a bountiful harvest and various barangays take part.
- "Silmugi" is an old name of the town of Borbon during the Pre-Spanish period which was named after the enchanting and enthralling river which was served as the nearest route for devout Catholics attending mass in Saint Sebastian Parish. The river has also become the main gateway for locals who lived in the hillsides of Borbon to conduct their business trade with coastal barangays surrounding it.
- The festival was eventually replaced by the Tuba Festival, which highlights more on the Toddy industry of the town. This change of name and focus was a move aimed at boosting the local economy of Coconut Toddy, known locally as "Tuba", in the town by endorsing it as a local cuisine and tourist attraction. Despite these changes, much of the celebration hasn't been greatly altered since the original festival of the town.

== Education ==
Schools:

- Bongoyan Elementary School
- Don Emilio Osmena Memorial School
- Cajel Elementary School
- Campusong Elementary School
- Bongdo Elementary School
- Laaw Elementary School
- Cadaruhan Elementary School
- Don Gregorio Antigua Elementary School
- Doña Mary R. Osmeña Memorial Elementary School
- Dona Milagros Osmena Elementary School
- Tabunan National High School
- Cebu Technical University-Tabogon Campus

== Sources ==
- "Borbon". Panublion. JESCON / Ateneo of Manila. 2003. Archived from the original on 24 December 2011.
- Sendino y Redondo, Felipe (1886). Breve reseña de lo que fue y de lo que es la Diócesis de Cebú en las Islas Filipinas (in Spanish). Manila: Colegio de Santo Tomas.
