= Tabogon =

Municipality in Cebu, Philippines

- Municipality
- Municipality of Tabogon
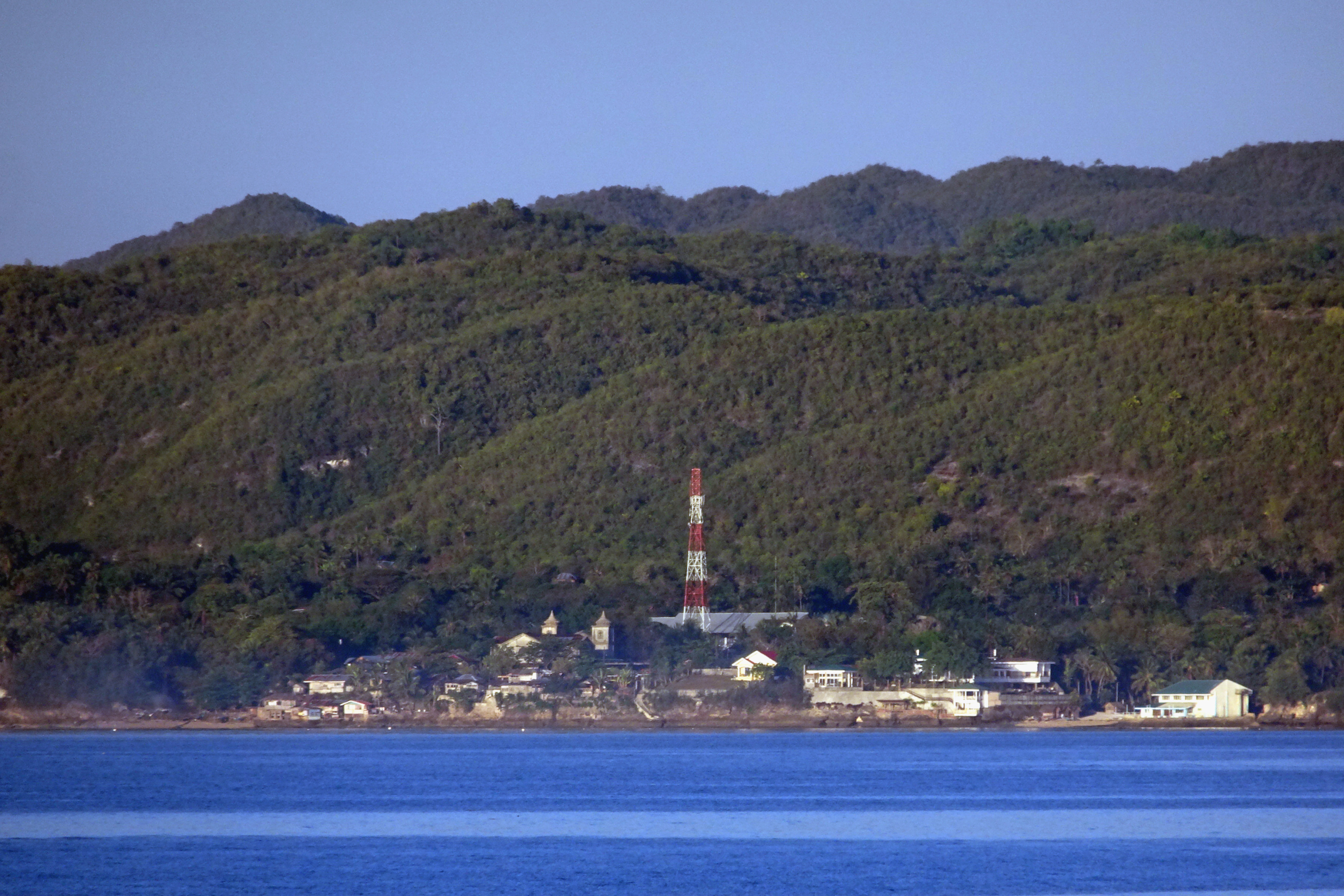
- View of Tabogon

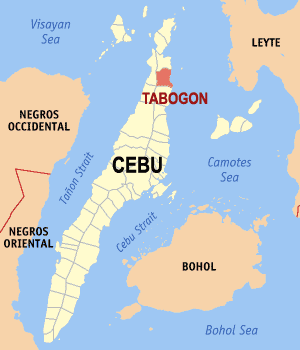
- Map of Cebu with Tabogon highlighted
- Interactive map of Tabogon
- Location within the Philippines
- Coordinates: 10°56′N 124°02′E
- Country: Philippines
- Region: Central Visayas
- Province: Cebu
- District: 4th district
- Barangays: 25 (see Barangays)

Government
  - Type: Sangguniang Bayan
  - Mayor: Francis Edward T. Salimbangon (1Cebu)
  - Vice Mayor: Jerome R. Escalona (PMP)
  - Representative: Sun J. Shimura (PMP)
  - Municipal Council: Members: Benhur Z. Salimbangon II; Martin B. Etulle; Michael H. Tan; Venerando B. Manloloyo; Sherwin V. Dichos; Kyle Chezka A. Hortelano; Leonardo B. Arpon; Michael Angelo M. Pasaol
  - Electorate: 29,265 voters (2025)

Area
  - Total: 101.35 km^{2} (39.13 sq mi)
- Elevation: 64 m (210 ft)
- Highest elevation: 294 m (965 ft)
- Lowest elevation: 0 m (0 ft)

Population (2024 census)
  - Total: 42,066
  - Density: 415.06/km^{2} (1,075.0/sq mi)
  - Households: 10,927

Economy
  - Income class: 2nd municipal income class
  - Poverty incidence: 25.36% (2023)
  - Revenue: ₱ 201.1 million (2024)
  - Assets: ₱ 611.5 million (2024)
  - Expenditure: ₱ 176.1 million (2024)
  - Liabilities: ₱ 120.5 million (2024)

Service provider
  - Electricity: Cebu 2 Electric Cooperative (CEBECO 2)
- Time zone: UTC+8 (PST)
- ZIP code: 6009
- PSGC: 072248000
- IDD : area code: +63 (0)32
- Native languages: Cebuano; Tagalog

Tabogon, officially the Municipality of Tabogon (Cebuano: Lungsod sa Tabogon; Tagalog: Bayan ng Tabogon), is a municipality in the province of Cebu, Philippines. According to the 2024 census, it has a population of 42,066 people.

== Etymology ==
Tabogon may come from the archaic Visayan word tabog, which means "busy", in reference to the bustling farm fields that dotted this place during the olden times; hence tabogon would mean a busy place of work.

== Geography ==
Tabogon is bordered on the north by the city of Bogo, to the west by the town of San Remigio, on the east by the Camotes Sea, and on the south by the town of Borbon.

=== Barangays ===
Tabogon is politically subdivided into 25 barangays. Each barangay consists of puroks and some have sitios.

PSGC	Barangay	Population			±% p.a.	
		2024		2010		
072248001	Alang‑alang	1.7%	731	664	▴	0.67%
072248002	Caduawan	6.6%	2,786	2,221	▴	1.59%
072248004	Camoboan	4.4%	1,842	1,490	▴	1.48%
072248005	Canaocanao	4.4%	1,861	1,693	▴	0.66%
072248006	Combado	1.5%	617	418	▴	2.74%
072248007	Daantabogon	2.9%	1,229	1,413	▾	−0.96%
072248008	Ilihan	10.1%	4,262	3,280	▴	1.83%
072248003	Kal‑anan	1.9%	815	851	▾	−0.30%
072248009	Labangon	4.6%	1,952	1,752	▴	0.75%
072248010	Libjo	6.5%	2,736	2,338	▴	1.10%
072248011	Loong	2.9%	1,211	1,080	▴	0.80%
072248012	Mabuli	4.1%	1,713	1,538	▴	0.75%
072248013	Managase	3.5%	1,467	1,225	▴	1.26%
072248014	Manlagtang	3.1%	1,299	1,192	▴	0.60%
072248015	Maslog	2.9%	1,239	1,094	▴	0.87%
072248016	Muabog	5.5%	2,330	2,042	▴	0.92%
072248017	Pio	1.9%	814	686	▴	1.19%
072248018	Poblacion	3.3%	1,387	1,228	▴	0.85%
072248019	Salag	3.5%	1,474	1,084	▴	2.16%
072248020	Sambag	2.1%	899	746	▴	1.30%
072248021	San Isidro	1.6%	669	616	▴	0.57%
072248022	San Vicente	1.9%	820	562	▴	2.66%
072248023	Somosa	5.7%	2,406	1,830	▴	1.92%
072248024	Taba‑ao	2.8%	1,177	1,003	▴	1.12%
072248025	Tapul	3.0%	1,277	978	▴	1.87%
	Total		42,066	33,024	▴	1.69%

=== Climate ===
Climate data for Tabogon, Cebu
Month	Jan	Feb	Mar	Apr	May	Jun	Jul	Aug	Sep	Oct	Nov	Dec	Year
Mean daily maximum °C (°F)	28 (82)	29 (84)	29 (84)	30 (86)	30 (86)	30 (86)	29 (84)	29 (84)	29 (84)	29 (84)	29 (84)	29 (84)	29 (84)
Mean daily minimum °C (°F)	22 (72)	22 (72)	22 (72)	23 (73)	25 (77)	25 (77)	25 (77)	25 (77)	25 (77)	24 (75)	24 (75)	23 (73)	24 (75)
Average precipitation mm (inches)	78 (3.1)	57 (2.2)	84 (3.3)	79 (3.1)	118 (4.6)	181 (7.1)	178 (7.0)	169 (6.7)	172 (6.8)	180 (7.1)	174 (6.9)	128 (5.0)	1,598 (62.9)
Average rainy days	16.7	13.8	17.3	18.5	23.2	26.5	27.1	26.0	26.4	27.5	24.6	21.0	268.6
Source: Meteoblue

== Demographics ==
Population census of Tabogon
Year	Pop.	±% p.a.
1903	9,308	—
1918	17,781	+4.41%
1939	20,201	+0.61%
1948	17,227	−1.75%
1960	20,219	+1.34%
1970	20,148	−0.04%
1975	20,198	+0.05%
1980	21,840	+1.57%
1990	24,945	+1.34%
1995	27,735	+2.01%
2000	27,827	+0.07%
2007	31,942	+1.92%
2010	33,024	+1.22%
2015	39,013	+3.22%
2020	41,432	+1.27%
2024	42,066	+0.37%
Source: Philippine Statistics Authority

== Economy ==
Poverty incidence of Tabogon (%)

Source: Philippine Statistics Authority
