= Medellin, Cebu =

Municipality in Cebu, Philippines

Medellin
- Municipality
- Municipality of Medellin
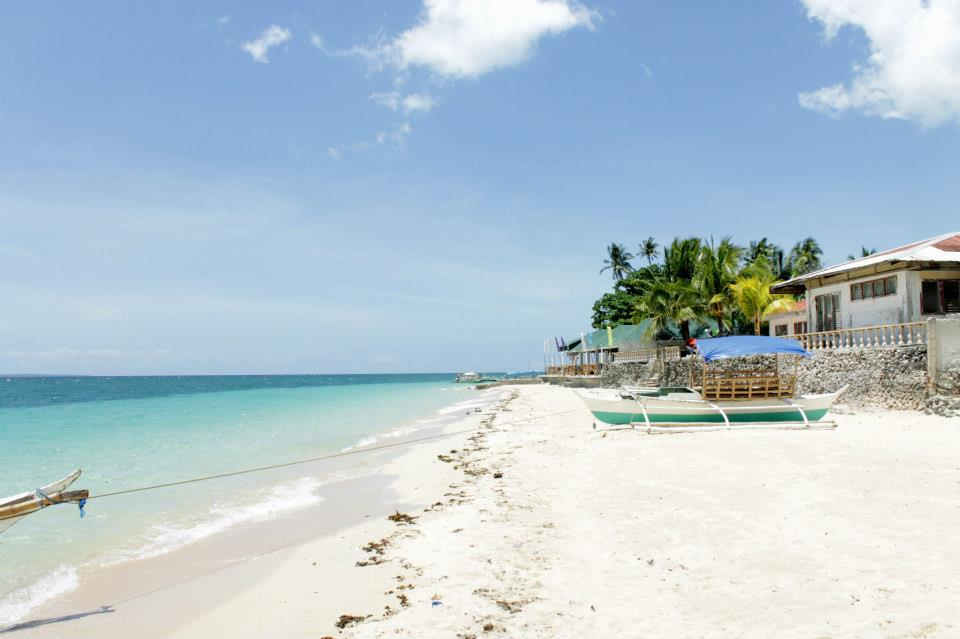

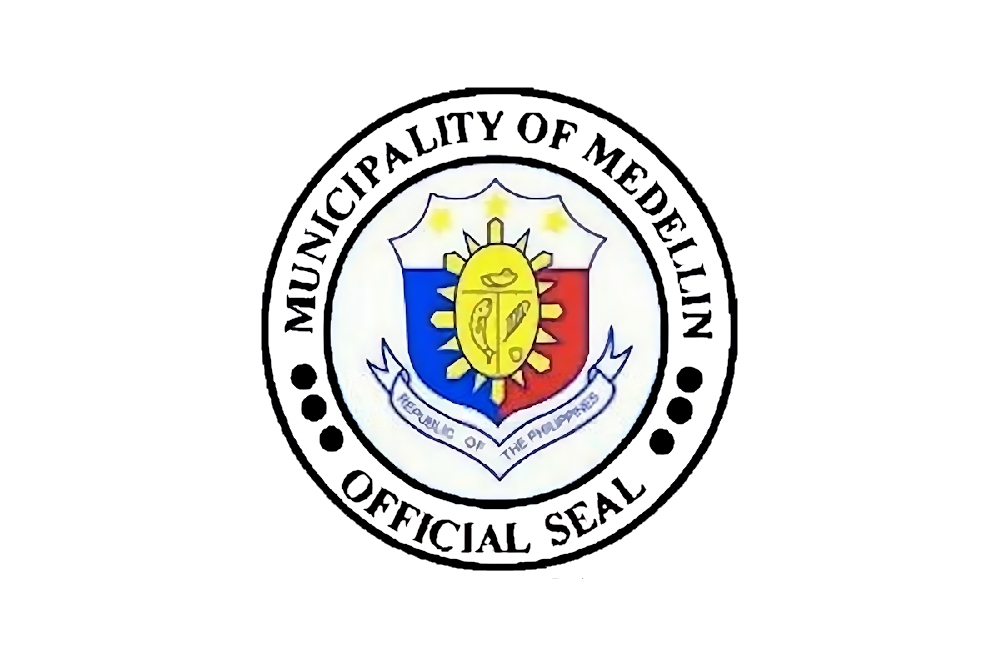
- Flag Seal

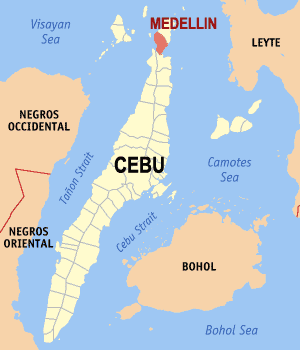
- Map of Cebu with Medellin highlighted
- Interactive map of Medellin
- Location within the Philippines
- Coordinates: 11°07′43″N 123°57′44″E
- Country: Philippines
- Region: Central Visayas
- Province: Cebu
- District: 4th district
- Founded: 9 September 1881
- Named for: Medellín, Spain
- Barangays: 19 (see Barangays)

Government
  - Type: Sangguniang Bayan
  - Mayor: Edwin L. Salimbangon (PFP)
  - Vice Mayor: Joven J. Mondigo, Jr. (1Cebu)
  - Representative: Sun J. Shimura (PMP)
  - Municipal Council: Members: Miguel Niko T. Salimbangon; John Paul J. Mondigo; Kendrick Allen A. Lim; Harold L. Salimbangon; Regene A. Cudiera; Raymond R. Olivar; Rondey Peter S. Rodriguez; Al John L. Lim
  - Electorate: 42,006 voters (2025)

Area
  - Total: 73.19 km^{2} (28.26 sq mi)
- Elevation: 13 m (43 ft)
- Highest elevation: 115 m (377 ft)
- Lowest elevation: 0 m (0 ft)

Population (2024 census)
  - Total: 62,163
  - Density: 849.3/km^{2} (2,200/sq mi)
  - Households: 14,149

Economy
  - Income class: 1st municipal income class
  - Poverty incidence: 31.16% (2023)
  - Revenue: ₱ 248.4 million (2024)
  - Assets: ₱ 695.1 million (2024)
  - Expenditure: ₱ 238.5 million (2024)
  - Liabilities: ₱ 143.6 million (2024)

Service provider
  - Electricity: Cebu 2 Electric Cooperative (CEBECO 2)
- Time zone: UTC+8 (PST)
- ZIP code: 6012
- PSGC: 072231000
- IDD : area code: +63 (0)32
- Native languages: Cebuano; Tagalog
- Website: www.medellin.gov.ph

Medellin, officially the Municipality of Medellin (Cebuano: Lungsod sa Medellin; Tagalog: Bayan ng Medellin), is a municipality in the province of Cebu, Philippines. According to the 2024 census, it has a population of 62,163 people.

== History ==
The name Medellin is of Spanish origin and refers to the village with the same name in the Badajoz province of Extremadura in Spain. Medellin became a municipality by royal decree of Queen Isabel II of Spain on September 9, 1881.

Medellin was formerly part of Daanbantayan. As a town, it started with only 3 barangays, namely; Kawit and Buenavista on the west coast, and Tindog on the east coast. Kawit, being the biggest and most progressive barangay at that time, became the first seat of government.

Due to its deep shore water, the area was prone to pirates. As a consequence, the seat of government was then transferred to Buenavista (Daanlungsod). However, in view of its shallow shore water, traders and merchants found it difficult to transport their wares to and from Buenavista. A distance away south of Buenavista, there was a place called Tawagan which was an ideal site for trade and commerce. When the seat of government was transferred to Tawagan, the new poblacion was then called Medellin.

== Geography ==
Medellin is bordered on the north by the town of Daanbantayan, to the west by the Tañon Strait, on the east by the Camotes Sea, on the southwest by the town of San Remigio and the southeast by the city of Bogo. It is 119 kilometres (74 mi) north from Cebu City.

Medellin is one of the nine municipalities comprising the 4th Congressional District Cebu Province.

=== Barangays ===
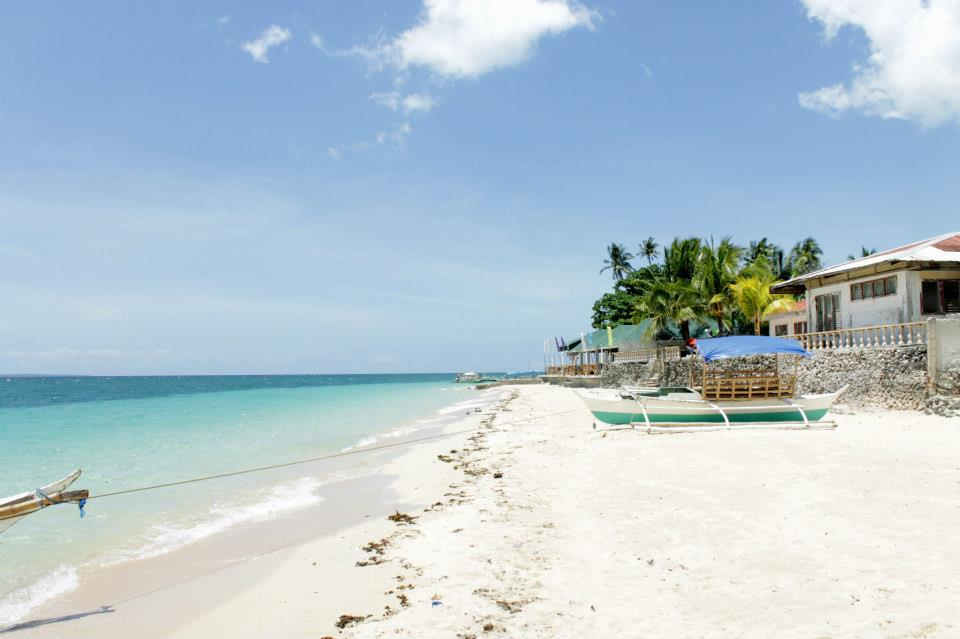
White beach near Seahorse Beach Resort

Medellin is politically subdivided into 19 barangays. Each barangay consists of puroks and some have sitios.

PSGC	Barangay	Population			±% p.a.	
		2024		2010		
072231001	Antipolo	8.0%	4,981	4,440	▴	0.80%
072231007	Canhabagat	3.8%	2,355	2,145	▴	0.65%
072231008	Caputatan Norte	4.6%	2,890	2,520	▴	0.96%
072231009	Caputatan Sur	4.4%	2,712	1,962	▴	2.27%
072231002	Curva	3.6%	2,241	2,049	▴	0.62%
072231003	Daanlungsod	6.1%	3,782	3,328	▴	0.89%
072231004	Dalingding Sur	1.6%	970	821	▴	1.16%
072231005	Dayhagon	2.9%	1,803	1,678	▴	0.50%
072231016	Don Virgilio Gonzales	2.4%	1,473	1,287	▴	0.94%
072231006	Gibitngil	3.4%	2,128	1,880	▴	0.86%
072231010	Kawit	12.3%	7,626	6,279	▴	1.36%
072231011	Lamintak Norte	3.4%	2,130	2,116	▴	0.05%
072231017	Lamintak Sur	4.2%	2,583	2,400	▴	0.51%
072231012	Luy‑a	3.1%	1,938	1,700	▴	0.91%
072231018	Maharuhay	2.4%	1,477	1,809	▾	−1.40%
072231019	Mahawak	4.9%	3,060	3,363	▾	−0.65%
072231013	Panugnawan	3.7%	2,290	2,233	▴	0.18%
072231014	Poblacion	8.8%	5,500	4,617	▴	1.22%
072231015	Tindog	5.5%	3,393	3,420	▾	−0.06%
	Total		62,163	50,047	▴	1.52%

=== Climate ===
Climate data for Medellin, Cebu
Month	Jan	Feb	Mar	Apr	May	Jun	Jul	Aug	Sep	Oct	Nov	Dec	Year
Mean daily maximum °C (°F)	28 (82)	29 (84)	29 (84)	30 (86)	30 (86)	30 (86)	29 (84)	29 (84)	29 (84)	29 (84)	29 (84)	29 (84)	29 (84)
Mean daily minimum °C (°F)	22 (72)	22 (72)	22 (72)	23 (73)	25 (77)	25 (77)	25 (77)	25 (77)	25 (77)	24 (75)	24 (75)	23 (73)	24 (75)
Average precipitation mm (inches)	78 (3.1)	57 (2.2)	84 (3.3)	79 (3.1)	118 (4.6)	181 (7.1)	178 (7.0)	169 (6.7)	172 (6.8)	180 (7.1)	174 (6.9)	128 (5.0)	1,598 (62.9)
Average rainy days	16.7	13.8	17.3	18.5	23.2	26.5	27.1	26.0	26.4	27.5	24.6	21.0	268.6
Source: Meteoblue

== Demographics ==
Population census of Medellin
Year	Pop.	±% p.a.
1903	10,578	—
1918	15,267	+2.48%
1939	18,637	+0.95%
1948	19,911	+0.74%
1960	21,188	+0.52%
1970	26,215	+2.15%
1975	27,474	+0.95%
1980	28,641	+0.84%
1990	34,184	+1.79%
1995	41,796	+3.84%
2000	43,113	+0.67%
2007	44,860	+0.55%
2010	50,047	+4.06%
2015	55,332	+1.93%
2020	59,605	+1.58%
2024	62,163	+1.01%
Source: Philippine Statistics Authority

== Economy ==
Poverty incidence of Medellin (%)

Source: Philippine Statistics Authority

The principal source of livelihood among locals is Fishing and Farming while Tourism plays a promising future. Large tracts of land were engage in cultivating Sugarcane hence the tagged as the "Sugar Bowl of Cebu". A sugar milling company BOMEDCO is still operating since it was founded in the year 1928. Its mill is located in Barangay Luy-a, Medellin, Cebu. The principal product of the company is raw sugar.

== Notable Personalities ==
- Melvin Osabel Buracho, Licensure Examination for Teachers (LET) Review Coach
- Janice Salimbangon, Member of the Philippine House of Representatives from Cebu's 4th district
- Harvey Cenit, is a Filipino fashion designer based in the United Arab Emirates.
