= Tabuelan =

Municipality in Cebu, Philippines

- Municipality
- Municipality of Tabuelan
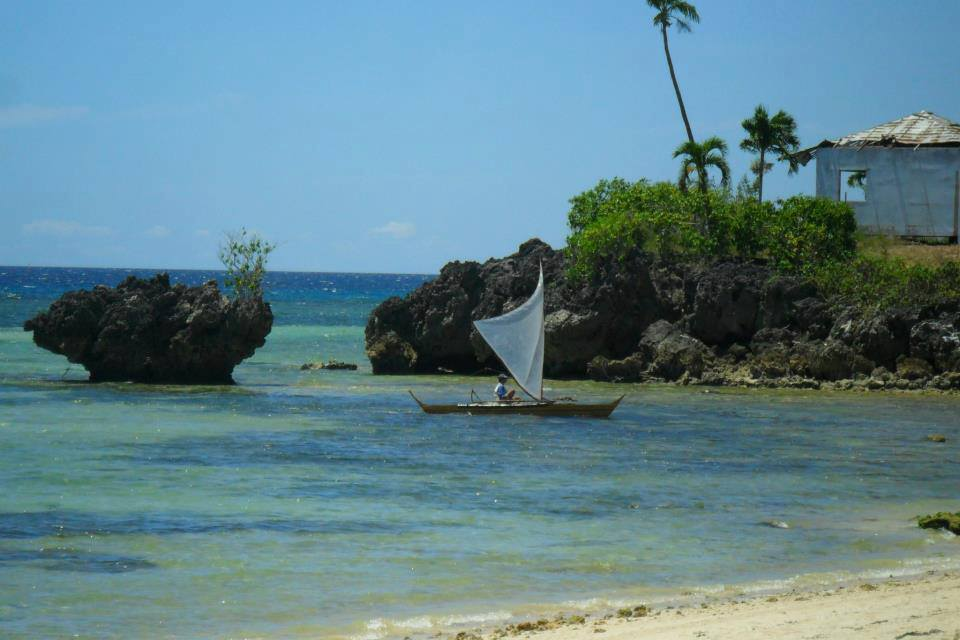
- Tabuelan beach

- Seal

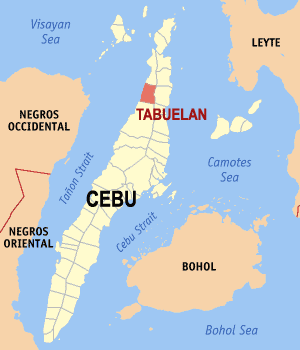
- Map of Cebu with Tabuelan highlighted
- Interactive map of Tabuelan
- Location within the Philippines
- Coordinates: 10°51′N 123°54′E
- Country: Philippines
- Region: Central Visayas
- Province: Cebu
- District: 4th district
- Founded: October 23, 1953
- Barangays: 12 (see Barangays)

Government
  - Type: Sangguniang Bayan
  - Mayor: Rex Casiano T. Gerona (NUP)
  - Vice Mayor: Rose Marie Gerona-Suezo (NUP)
  - Representative: Sun J. Shimura (PMP)
  - Municipal Council: Members: Catherine R. Gallo; Ramon B. Arellano; Ike B. Momo; Riza M. Bravo; Joel M. Gerona; Manuel S. Gerona, Jr.; Joyce T. Balvez-Arellano; Alberto D. Comahig
  - Electorate: 21,219 voters (2025)

Area
  - Total: 141.13 km^{2} (54.49 sq mi)
- Elevation: 46 m (151 ft)
- Highest elevation: 207 m (679 ft)
- Lowest elevation: 0 m (0 ft)

Population (2024 census)
  - Total: 29,662
  - Density: 210.18/km^{2} (544.35/sq mi)
  - Households: 7,545

Economy
  - Income class: 2nd municipal income class
  - Poverty incidence: 24.95% (2023)
  - Revenue: ₱ 96.78 million (2024)
  - Assets: ₱ 451.1 million (2024)
  - Expenditure: ₱ 31.56 million (2024)
  - Liabilities: ₱ 133.7 million (2024)

Service provider
  - Electricity: Cebu 2 Electric Cooperative (CEBECO 2)
- Time zone: UTC+8 (PST)
- ZIP code: 6044
- PSGC: 072249000
- IDD : area code: +63 (0)32
- Native languages: Cebuano; Tagalog

Tabuelan, officially the Municipality of Tabuelan (Cebuano: Lungsod sa Tabuelan; Tagalog: Bayan ng Tabuelan), is a 2nd income class municipality in the province of Cebu, Philippines. According to the 2024 census, it has a population of 29,662 people.

== History ==
Tabuelan used to be a barangay of Tuburan until the 1950s, and it was also Tuburan's largest barangay at the time. In fact, all of its constituent barangays were once barrios of then Barangay Tabuelan. In 1953, Tabuelan was separated via a Philippine Law from its mother municipality of Tuburan, on the grounds that Barangay Tabuelan is far from the administrative center of Tuburan (Poblacion Tuburan) and hence, it was not able to properly maintain and address the needs of the people in that barangay. Tuburan opposed such partition but when the law was upheld, it humbly gave way and followed the mandate of the law to avoid economic repercussions. Hence, being formally established as a full-fledged municipality in 1953, makes Tabuelan the youngest municipality on Cebu island.

== Geography ==
Tabuelan is bordered to the north by the town of San Remigio, to the west is the Tañon Strait, to the east are the towns of Borbon and Sogod, and to the south is the town of Tuburan. It is 94 kilometres (58 mi) from Cebu City and 33 kilometres (21 mi) from San Remigio.

=== Barangays ===
Tabuelan is politically subdivided into 12 barangays. Each barangay consists of puroks and some have sitios.

PSGC	Barangay	Population			±% p.a.	
		2024		2010		
072249001	Bongon	12.5%	3,701	3,315	▴	0.77%
072249010	Dalid	4.4%	1,318	1,262	▴	0.30%
072249005	Kanlim‑ao	3.3%	972	980	▾	−0.06%
072249006	Kanluhangon	3.5%	1,026	1,018	▴	0.05%
072249008	Kantubaon	5.8%	1,709	1,672	▴	0.15%
072249013	Mabunao	3.2%	947	747	▴	1.66%
072249014	Maravilla	8.7%	2,573	2,171	▴	1.19%
072249015	Olivo	7.1%	2,120	1,897	▴	0.77%
072249016	Poblacion	17.5%	5,201	4,796	▴	0.56%
072249017	Tabunok	11.9%	3,531	2,266	▴	3.13%
072249018	Tigbawan	7.0%	2,073	1,767	▴	1.11%
072249019	Villahermosa	1.5%	459	401	▴	0.94%
	Total		29,662	22,292	▴	2.00%

=== Climate ===
Climate data for Tabuelan, Cebu
Month	Jan	Feb	Mar	Apr	May	Jun	Jul	Aug	Sep	Oct	Nov	Dec	Year
Mean daily maximum °C (°F)	28 (82)	29 (84)	30 (86)	31 (88)	31 (88)	30 (86)	30 (86)	30 (86)	30 (86)	29 (84)	29 (84)	28 (82)	30 (85)
Mean daily minimum °C (°F)	23 (73)	23 (73)	23 (73)	24 (75)	25 (77)	25 (77)	25 (77)	25 (77)	25 (77)	25 (77)	24 (75)	23 (73)	24 (75)
Average precipitation mm (inches)	70 (2.8)	49 (1.9)	62 (2.4)	78 (3.1)	138 (5.4)	201 (7.9)	192 (7.6)	185 (7.3)	192 (7.6)	205 (8.1)	156 (6.1)	111 (4.4)	1,639 (64.6)
Average rainy days	13.4	10.6	13.1	14.5	24.2	27.9	28.4	27.7	27.1	27.4	22.5	15.9	252.7
Source: Meteoblue

== Demographics ==
Population census of Tabuelan
Year	Pop.	±% p.a.
1960	19,626	—
1970	12,961	−4.06%
1975	13,890	+1.40%
1980	14,499	+0.86%
1990	15,515	+0.68%
1995	16,936	+1.66%
2000	19,373	+2.92%
2007	21,421	+1.40%
2010	22,292	+1.46%
2015	25,630	+2.69%
2020	28,907	+2.56%
2024	29,662	+0.62%
Source: Philippine Statistics Authority

== Economy ==
Poverty incidence of Tabuelan (%)

Source: Philippine Statistics Authority

== Transportation ==
V-Hire, Ceres Liner and Mini Buses are among the PUVs going to the town. They mostly bypass here for their Main Routes are either San Remigio or Tuburan.
