= Sogod, Cebu =

Municipality in Cebu, Philippines

Sogod
- Municipality
- Municipality of Sogod
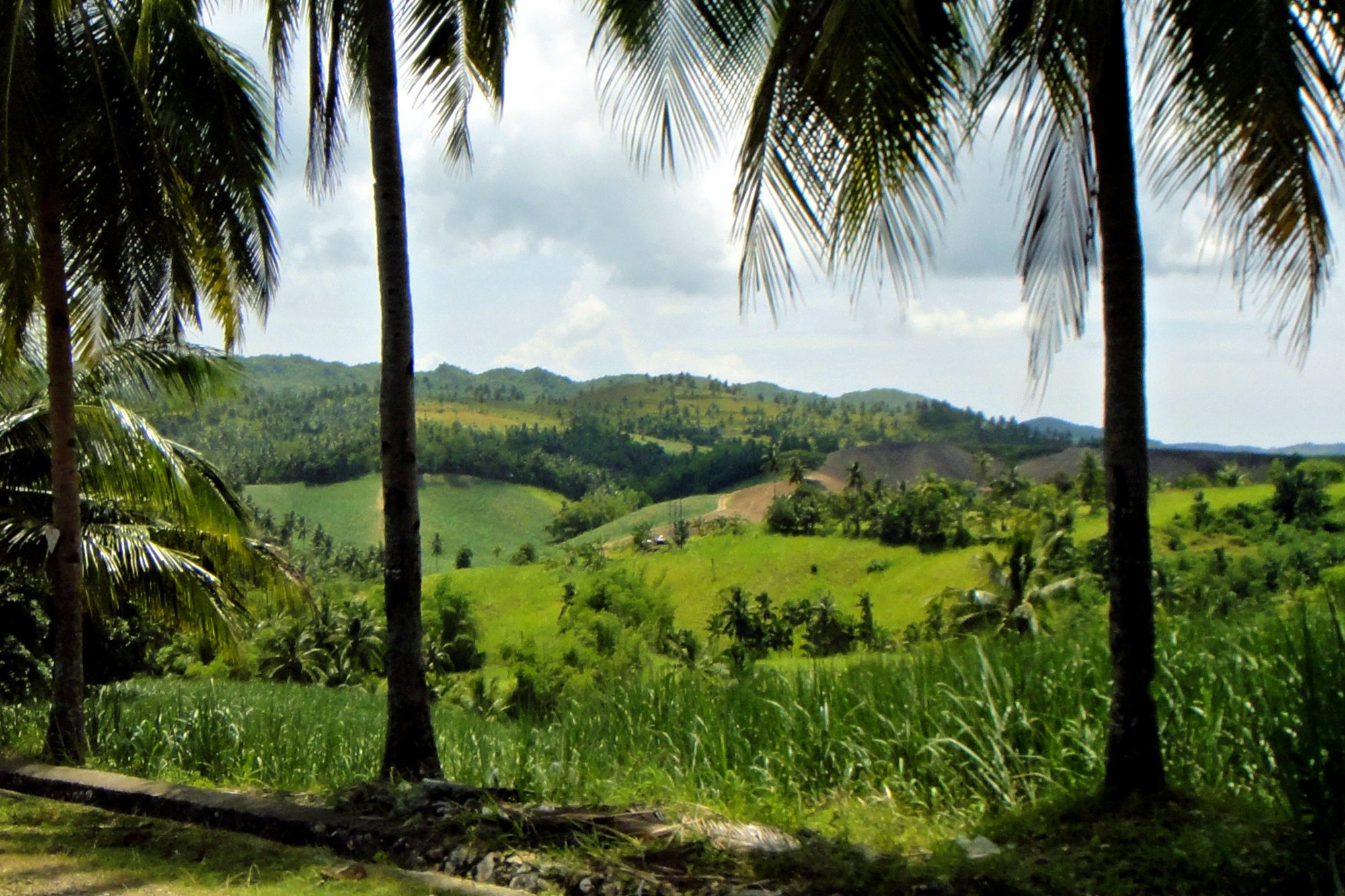
- Tropical forest and farmland

- Seal

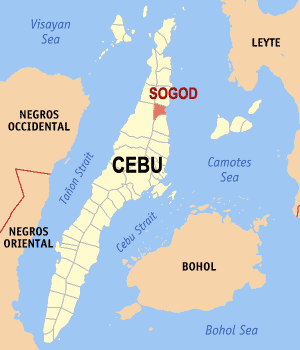
- Map of Cebu with Sogod highlighted
- Interactive map of Sogod
- Location within the Philippines
- Coordinates: 10°45′N 124°00′E
- Country: Philippines
- Region: Central Visayas
- Province: Cebu
- District: 5th district
- Founded: 1921
- Barangays: 18 (see Barangays)

Government
  - Type: Sangguniang Bayan
  - Mayor: Lissa Marie Durano-Streegan
  - Vice Mayor: Richard B. Streegan
  - Representative: Vincent Franco D. Frasco
  - Municipal Council: Members: Arman P. Menchavez; Rolando G. Soltones; Woodrow Q. Presillas; Gabriel V. Roble; Leonardo A. Moneva; Edgar C. Ceniza; Rex A. Bacayo; Crispin T. Retiza Jr.
  - Electorate: 26,198 voters (2025)

Area
  - Total: 119.23 km^{2} (46.03 sq mi)
- Elevation: 98 m (322 ft)
- Highest elevation: 445 m (1,460 ft)
- Lowest elevation: 0 m (0 ft)

Population (2024 census)
  - Total: 40,746
  - Density: 341.74/km^{2} (885.11/sq mi)
  - Households: 9,878

Economy
  - Income class: 2nd municipal income class
  - Poverty incidence: 22.54% (2023)
  - Revenue: ₱ 225 million (2024)
  - Assets: ₱ 643.2 million (2024)
  - Expenditure: ₱ 252.4 million (2024)
  - Liabilities: ₱ 153 million (2024)

Service provider
  - Electricity: Cebu 2 Electric Cooperative (CEBECO 2)
- Time zone: UTC+8 (PST)
- ZIP code: 6007
- PSGC: 072247000
- IDD : area code: +63 (0)32
- Native languages: Cebuano; Tagalog

Sogod, officially the Municipality of Sogod (Cebuano: Lungsod sa Sogod; Tagalog: Bayan ng Sogod), is a municipality located in the northeastern part of Cebu, Philippines. According to the 2024 census, it has a population of 40,746 people.

== History ==
On the evening of February 2, 1966, a shootout occurred that resulted in the deaths of mayor Juan B. Dosado, chief of police Brigido Bragat Sr. and his son Brigido Jr., and Catmon councilor Jovito Barte.

On April 27, 2000, 30 rebel members of the New People's Army stormed the town hall and other municipal offices of Sogod, stealing multiple firearms and cutting off telecommunication lines in their attempt to look for mayor Thaddeus Durano, whom they accused of perpetrating the disappearance of Fr. Rudy Romano in the 1980s.

== Geography ==
Sogod is 60 kilometres (37 mi) from Cebu City and 28 kilometres (17 mi) from Tabuelan. It is bordered to the north by Borbon, to the west by Tuburan and Tabuelan, to the east by the Camotes Sea, and to the south by Catmon.

=== Barangays ===
Sogod is politically subdivided into 18 barangays. Each barangay consists of puroks (otherwise known as sitios).

The municipality has 6 coastal barangays and 12 upland barangays. Out of the 18 barangays in the municipality, the coastal barangays with the inclusion of Barangay Ibabao are considered to be urbanized and 11 are rural.

PSGC	Barangay	Population			±% p.a.	
		2024		2010		
072247001	Ampongol	2.4%	979	789	▴	1.49%
072247002	Bagakay	1.8%	728	681	▴	0.46%
072247003	Bagatayam	5.9%	2,396	2,110	▴	0.88%
072247004	Bawo	6.6%	2,679	2,338	▴	0.94%
072247005	Cabalawan	6.9%	2,829	2,793	▴	0.09%
072247006	Cabangahan	2.5%	1,031	876	▴	1.13%
072247007	Calumboyan	7.1%	2,896	2,479	▴	1.07%
072247009	Dakit	2.1%	840	1,056	▾	−1.56%
072247010	Damolog	8.4%	3,433	2,912	▴	1.14%
072247011	Ibabao	6.0%	2,444	1,535	▴	3.25%
072247012	Liki	4.7%	1,911	1,625	▴	1.12%
072247013	Lubo	2.5%	1,000	807	▴	1.48%
072247014	Mohon	2.8%	1,158	972	▴	1.21%
072247015	Nahus‑an	2.6%	1,068	976	▴	0.62%
072247019	Pansoy	3.9%	1,586	1,455	▴	0.59%
072247016	Poblacion	8.5%	3,472	3,086	▴	0.81%
072247017	Tabunok	8.7%	3,539	3,147	▴	0.81%
072247018	Takay	2.7%	1,119	989	▴	0.85%
	Total		40,746	30,626	▴	1.98%

=== Climate ===
Climate data for Sogod, Cebu
Month	Jan	Feb	Mar	Apr	May	Jun	Jul	Aug	Sep	Oct	Nov	Dec	Year
Mean daily maximum °C (°F)	28 (82)	29 (84)	30 (86)	31 (88)	31 (88)	30 (86)	30 (86)	30 (86)	30 (86)	29 (84)	29 (84)	28 (82)	30 (85)
Mean daily minimum °C (°F)	23 (73)	22 (72)	23 (73)	24 (75)	25 (77)	25 (77)	25 (77)	25 (77)	25 (77)	25 (77)	24 (75)	23 (73)	24 (75)
Average precipitation mm (inches)	70 (2.8)	49 (1.9)	62 (2.4)	78 (3.1)	138 (5.4)	201 (7.9)	192 (7.6)	185 (7.3)	192 (7.6)	205 (8.1)	156 (6.1)	111 (4.4)	1,639 (64.6)
Average rainy days	13.4	10.6	13.1	14.5	24.2	27.9	28.4	27.7	27.1	27.4	22.5	15.9	252.7
Source: Meteoblue

== Demographics ==
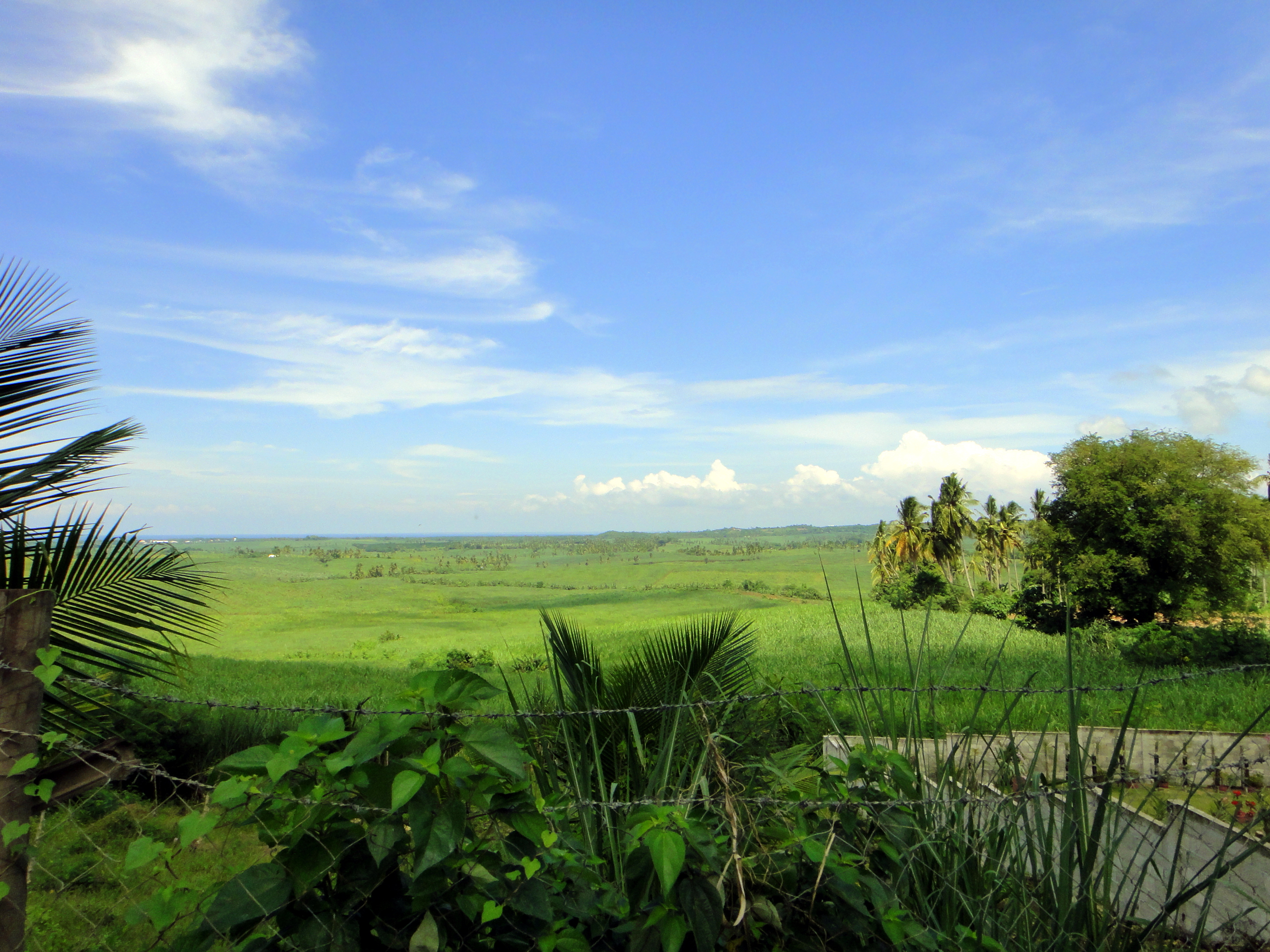
Tropical forest and farmland near Sogod

Population census of Sogod
Year	Pop.	±% p.a.
1903	6,071	—
1939	14,479	+2.44%
1948	15,687	+0.89%
1960	16,798	+0.57%
1970	18,731	+1.09%
1975	19,617	+0.93%
1980	20,626	+1.01%
1990	23,426	+1.28%
1995	25,186	+1.37%
2000	27,432	+1.85%
2007	28,955	+0.75%
2010	30,626	+2.06%
2015	35,108	+2.64%
2020	39,447	+2.48%
2024	40,746	+0.78%
Source: Philippine Statistics Authority

== Economy ==
Poverty incidence of Sogod (%)

Source: Philippine Statistics Authority

== Tourism ==
- St. James the Great Parish
- Bagatayam Falls
- Binaliw Cold Spring
- Sacaan Sea Breeze Resort
- El Mar Resort
- Northsky Beach Resort
- North Coast Beach Resort
- Paseo de Porferio
- Northern Aire Restaurant

=== Handicrafts ===
Sogod is known for its craftsmanship in making handwoven furniture, handcrafted by Sogoranon weavers, collectively known as 'Weavers of Hope'. Their products are found in Barangay Liki, Sogod, Cebu.

=== Literary prominence ===
Sogod is home to several known Cebuano writers such as Santiago Pepito, Benjamin Montejo, Oliver Flores, Ma. Vera Naome Flores and Vincent Isles. Much of the municipality's profile and characteristics are often depicted in their respective narratives.
