= Cebu's 4th congressional district =

Legislative district of the Philippines

- Constituency for the House of Representatives of the Philippines
- Boundary of Cebu's 4th congressional district in Cebu

- Location of Cebu within the Philippines
- Province: Cebu
- Region: Central Visayas
- Population: 540,814 (2020)
- Electorate: 345,099 (2022)
- Major settlements: 9 LGUs: Cities; Bogo; Municipalities; Bantayan; Daanbantayan; Madridejos; Medellin; San Remigio; Santa Fe; Tabogon; Tabuelan
- Area: 740.41 km^{2} (285.87 sq mi)

Current constituency
- Created: 1907
- Representative: Sun J. Shimura
- Political party: NUP; 1CEBU
- Congressional bloc: Majority

Cebu's 4th congressional district is one of the seven congressional districts of the Philippines in the province of Cebu. It has been represented in the House of Representatives of the Philippines since 1916 and earlier in the Philippine Assembly from 1907 to 1916. The district consists of the northern city of Bogo and adjacent municipalities of Bantayan, Daanbantayan, Madridejos, Medellin, San Remigio, Santa Fe, Tabogon and Tabuelan. It is currently represented in the 20th Congress by Sun J. Shimura of the National Unity Party (NUP) and One Cebu (1CEBU).

Prior to its second dissolution in 1972, it consisted of the southeastern municipalities of Alcoy, Argao, Dalaguete, and Sibonga.

== Representation history ==
#	Image	Member	Term of office		Legislature	Party	Electoral history	Constituent LGUs
#	Image	Member	Start	End	Legislature	Party	Electoral history	Constituent LGUs
=== Cebu's 4th district for the Philippine Assembly ===
District created January 9, 1907.
1		Alejandro Ruiz	October 16, 1907	October 16, 1916	1st	Nacionalista	Elected in 1907.	1907–1916; Argao, Dalaguete, Sibonga
1		Alejandro Ruiz	October 16, 1907	October 16, 1916	2nd	Nacionalista	Re-elected in 1909.	1907–1916; Argao, Dalaguete, Sibonga
1		Alejandro Ruiz	October 16, 1907	October 16, 1916	3rd	Nacionalista	Re-elected in 1912.	1907–1916; Argao, Dalaguete, Sibonga
=== Cebu's 4th district for the House of Representatives of the Philippine Islands ===
(1)		Alejandro Ruiz	October 16, 1916	June 3, 1919	4th	Nacionalista	Re-elected in 1916.	1916–1935; Alcoy, Argao, Dalaguete, Sibonga
2		Isidoro Aldanese	June 3, 1919	June 2, 1925	5th	Nacionalista	Elected in 1919.	1916–1935; Alcoy, Argao, Dalaguete, Sibonga
2		Isidoro Aldanese	June 3, 1919	June 2, 1925	6th	Nacionalista; Unipersonalista	Re-elected in 1922.	1916–1935; Alcoy, Argao, Dalaguete, Sibonga
3		Juan Alcazaren	June 2, 1925	June 5, 1934	7th	Nacionalista; Consolidado	Elected in 1925.	1916–1935; Alcoy, Argao, Dalaguete, Sibonga
3		Juan Alcazaren	June 2, 1925	June 5, 1934	8th	Nacionalista; Consolidado	Re-elected in 1928.	1916–1935; Alcoy, Argao, Dalaguete, Sibonga
3		Juan Alcazaren	June 2, 1925	June 5, 1934	9th	Nacionalista; Consolidado	Re-elected in 1931.	1916–1935; Alcoy, Argao, Dalaguete, Sibonga
4		Agustín Kintanar	June 5, 1934	September 16, 1935	10th	Nacionalista; Democrático	Elected in 1934.	1916–1935; Alcoy, Argao, Dalaguete, Sibonga
#	Image	Member	Term of office		National Assembly	Party	Electoral history	Constituent LGUs
#	Image	Member	Start	End	National Assembly	Party	Electoral history	Constituent LGUs
=== Cebu's 4th district for the National Assembly (Commonwealth of the Philippines) ===
5		Vicente Rama	September 16, 1935	December 30, 1938	1st	Nacionalista; Democrático	Elected in 1935.	1935–1941; Alcoy, Argao, Dalaguete, Sibonga
(4)		Agustín Kintanar	December 30, 1938	December 30, 1941	2nd	Nacionalista	Elected in 1938.	1935–1941; Alcoy, Argao, Dalaguete, Sibonga
District dissolved into the two-seat Cebu's at-large district for the National Assembly (Second Philippine Republic).
#	Image	Member	Term of office		Common wealth Congress	Party	Electoral history	Constituent LGUs
#	Image	Member	Start	End	Common wealth Congress	Party	Electoral history	Constituent LGUs
=== Cebu's 4th district for the House of Representatives of the Commonwealth of the Philippines ===
District re-created May 24, 1945.
(4)		Agustín Kintanar	June 9, 1945	May 25, 1946	1st	Nacionalista	Re-elected in 1941.	1945–1946; Alcoy, Argao, Dalaguete, Sibonga
#	Image	Member	Term of office		Congress	Party	Electoral history	Constituent LGUs
#	Image	Member	Start	End	Congress	Party	Electoral history	Constituent LGUs
=== Cebu's 4th district for the House of Representatives of the Philippines ===
(4)		Agustín Kintanar	May 25, 1946	December 30, 1949	1st	Nacionalista	Re-elected in 1946.	1946–1972; Alcoy, Argao, Dalaguete, Sibonga
6		Filomeno C. Kintanar	December 30, 1949	December 30, 1953	2nd	Liberal	Elected in 1949.	1946–1972; Alcoy, Argao, Dalaguete, Sibonga
7		Isidro Kintanar	December 30, 1953	April 8, 1968	3rd	Nacionalista	Elected in 1953.	1946–1972; Alcoy, Argao, Dalaguete, Sibonga
7		Isidro Kintanar	December 30, 1953	April 8, 1968	4th	Nacionalista	Re-elected in 1957.	1946–1972; Alcoy, Argao, Dalaguete, Sibonga
7		Isidro Kintanar	December 30, 1953	April 8, 1968	5th	Nacionalista	Re-elected in 1961.	1946–1972; Alcoy, Argao, Dalaguete, Sibonga
7		Isidro Kintanar	December 30, 1953	April 8, 1968	6th	Nacionalista	Re-elected in 1965. Died.	1946–1972; Alcoy, Argao, Dalaguete, Sibonga
8		Gaudencio Beduya	December 30, 1969	September 23, 1972	7th	Nacionalista	Elected in 1969. Removed from office after imposition of martial law.	1946–1972; Alcoy, Argao, Dalaguete, Sibonga
District dissolved into the thirteen-seat Region VII's at-large district for the Interim Batasang Pambansa, followed by the six-seat Cebu's at-large district for the Regular Batasang Pambansa.
District re-created February 2, 1987.
9		Celestino E. Martinez Jr.	June 30, 1987	June 30, 1998	8th	LABAN	Elected in 1987.	1987–present Bantayan, Bogo, Daanbantayan, Madridejos, Medellin, San Remigio, Santa Fe, Tabogon, Tabuelan
9		Celestino E. Martinez Jr.	June 30, 1987	June 30, 1998	9th	NPC	Re-elected in 1992.	1987–present Bantayan, Bogo, Daanbantayan, Madridejos, Medellin, San Remigio, Santa Fe, Tabogon, Tabuelan
9		Celestino E. Martinez Jr.	June 30, 1987	June 30, 1998	10th	Lakas	Re-elected in 1995.	1987–present Bantayan, Bogo, Daanbantayan, Madridejos, Medellin, San Remigio, Santa Fe, Tabogon, Tabuelan
10		Clavel A. Martinez	June 30, 1998	June 30, 2007	11th	Lakas	Elected in 1998.	1987–present Bantayan, Bogo, Daanbantayan, Madridejos, Medellin, San Remigio, Santa Fe, Tabogon, Tabuelan
10		Clavel A. Martinez	June 30, 1998	June 30, 2007	12th	Lakas	Re-elected in 2001.	1987–present Bantayan, Bogo, Daanbantayan, Madridejos, Medellin, San Remigio, Santa Fe, Tabogon, Tabuelan
10		Clavel A. Martinez	June 30, 1998	June 30, 2007	13th	Lakas	Re-elected in 2004.	1987–present Bantayan, Bogo, Daanbantayan, Madridejos, Medellin, San Remigio, Santa Fe, Tabogon, Tabuelan
11		Benhur Salimbangon	June 30, 2007	May 24, 2010	14th	Lakas	Elected in 2007. Election annulled after an electoral protest.	1987–present Bantayan, Bogo, Daanbantayan, Madridejos, Medellin, San Remigio, Santa Fe, Tabogon, Tabuelan
12		Celestino A. Martinez III	May 24, 2010	June 30, 2010	14th	Liberal	Declared winner of 2007 elections.	1987–present Bantayan, Bogo, Daanbantayan, Madridejos, Medellin, San Remigio, Santa Fe, Tabogon, Tabuelan
(11)		Benhur Salimbangon	June 30, 2010	June 30, 2019	15th	Lakas (1CEBU)	Re-elected in 2010.	1987–present Bantayan, Bogo, Daanbantayan, Madridejos, Medellin, San Remigio, Santa Fe, Tabogon, Tabuelan
(11)		Benhur Salimbangon	June 30, 2010	June 30, 2019	16th	NUP (1CEBU)	Re-elected in 2013.	1987–present Bantayan, Bogo, Daanbantayan, Madridejos, Medellin, San Remigio, Santa Fe, Tabogon, Tabuelan
(11)		Benhur Salimbangon	June 30, 2010	June 30, 2019	17th	NUP (1CEBU)	Re-elected in 2016.	1987–present Bantayan, Bogo, Daanbantayan, Madridejos, Medellin, San Remigio, Santa Fe, Tabogon, Tabuelan
13		Janice Z. Salimbangon	June 30, 2019	June 30, 2025	18th	PDP–Laban (1CEBU)	Elected in 2019.	1987–present Bantayan, Bogo, Daanbantayan, Madridejos, Medellin, San Remigio, Santa Fe, Tabogon, Tabuelan
13		Janice Z. Salimbangon	June 30, 2019	June 30, 2025	19th	NUP (1CEBU)	Re-elected in 2022.	1987–present Bantayan, Bogo, Daanbantayan, Madridejos, Medellin, San Remigio, Santa Fe, Tabogon, Tabuelan
14		Sun J. Shimura	June 30, 2025	Incumbent	20th	PMP (1CEBU)	Elected in 2025.	1987–present Bantayan, Bogo, Daanbantayan, Madridejos, Medellin, San Remigio, Santa Fe, Tabogon, Tabuelan
14		Sun J. Shimura	June 30, 2025	Incumbent	20th	NUP (1CEBU)	Elected in 2025.	1987–present Bantayan, Bogo, Daanbantayan, Madridejos, Medellin, San Remigio, Santa Fe, Tabogon, Tabuelan

== Election results ==
=== 2025 ===
2025 Philippine House of Representatives elections
Party	Candidate	Votes	%
PMP	Sun Shimura	149,336	61.13
NUP	Janice Salimbangon	132,302	46.56
Independent	Sal Arapal Cariaga	2,509	0.88
Total votes		284,147	100.00
PMP gain from NUP			

=== 2022 ===
2022 Philippine House of Representatives elections
Party	Candidate	Votes	%
NUP	Janice Salimbangon	163,913	61.13
PPP	Celestino Martinez Jr.	102,020	38.05
Independent	Sal Arapal Cariaga	2,223	0.83
Total votes		268,156	100.00
NUP hold			

=== 2019 ===
2019 Philippine House of Representatives elections
Party	Candidate	Votes	%
PDP–Laban	Janice Salimbangon	136,582	56.89
NPC	Celestino Martinez Jr.	103,493	43.10
Total votes		240,075	100.00
PDP–Laban gain from NUP			

=== 2016 ===
2016 Philippine House of Representatives elections
Party	Candidate	Votes	%
NUP	Benhur Salimbangon	132,548	61.00
Liberal	Celestino Martinez Jr.	85,107	39.00
Total votes		217,655	100.00

=== 2013 ===
2013 Philippine House of Representatives elections
Party	Candidate	Votes	%
NUP	Benhur Salimbangon	117,844	55.73
Liberal	Celestino Martinez III	71,438	33.79
Valid ballots		189,282	89.52
Invalid or blank votes		22,157	10.48
Total votes		211,439	100.00
NUP hold			

=== 2010 ===
2010 Philippine House of Representatives elections
Party	Candidate	Votes	%
Lakas–Kampi	Benhur Salimbangon	137,324	67.48
Liberal	Celestino Martinez III	66,165	32.52
Valid ballots		203,334	93.76
Invalid or blank votes		13,549	6.24
Total votes		217,038	100.00
Lakas–Kampi hold			

=== 2007 ===
2007 Philippine House of Representatives elections
Party	Candidate	Votes	%
Lakas–Kampi	Benhur Salimbangon	67,227	50.02
Liberal	Celestino Martinez III	67,173	49.98
Total votes		134,400	100.00
Lakas–Kampi hold			

== See also ==
- Legislative districts of Cebu
