= San Remigio, Cebu =

Municipality in Cebu, Philippines

San Remigio Kanghagas San Remigio de Canjagas
- Municipality
- Municipality of San Remigio
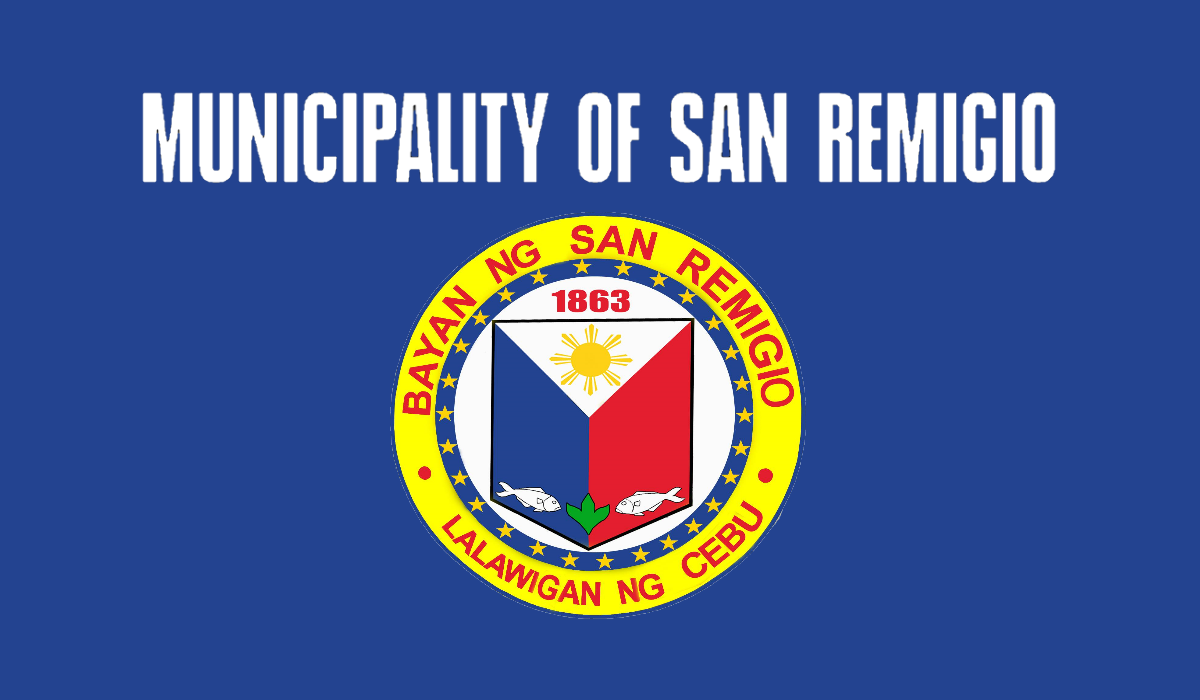
- Flag

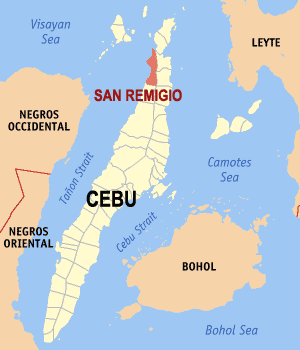
- Map of Cebu with San Remigio highlighted
- Interactive map of San Remigio
- Location within the Philippines
- Coordinates: 11°00′N 123°57′E
- Country: Philippines
- Region: Central Visayas
- Province: Cebu
- District: 4th district
- Founded: 1863
- Named for: Saint Remigius
- Barangays: 27 (see Barangays)

Government
  - Type: Sangguniang Bayan
  - Mayor: Mariano R. Martinez (LDP)
  - Vice Mayor: Alphonsine Corominas-Gonzales (LDP)
  - Representative: Sun J. Shimura (PMP)
  - Municipal Council: Members: Michael Jeffrey N. Go; Iluminado M. Ornopia; Kyle Alfonso D. Pestolante; Miguel Maria T. Martinez; Conrado A. Loon; Joycee L. Olivar; Inocencio A. Miscala, Jr.; Jessa Faith A. Olivar
  - Electorate: 44,858 voters (2025)

Area
  - Total: 95.27 km^{2} (36.78 sq mi)
- Elevation: 8.0 m (26.2 ft)
- Highest elevation: 81 m (266 ft)
- Lowest elevation: 0 m (0 ft)

Population (2024 census)
  - Total: 67,850
  - Density: 712.2/km^{2} (1,845/sq mi)
  - Households: 16,707

Economy
  - Income class: 1st municipal income class
  - Poverty incidence: 24.13% (2023)
  - Revenue: ₱ 271 million (2024)
  - Assets: ₱ 835.6 million (2024)
  - Expenditure: ₱ 213.3 million (2024)
  - Liabilities: ₱ 156.2 million (2024)

Service provider
  - Electricity: Cebu 2 Electric Cooperative (CEBECO 2)
- Time zone: UTC+8 (PST)
- ZIP code: 6011
- PSGC: 072243000
- IDD : area code: +63 (0)32
- Native languages: Cebuano; Tagalog
- Website: sanremigio.gov.ph

San Remigio, officially called the Municipality of San Remigio (Cebuano: Lungsod sa San Remigio; Tagalog: Bayan ng San Remigio), is a municipality in the province of Cebu, Philippines. According to the 2024 census, it has a population of 67,850 people.

== History ==
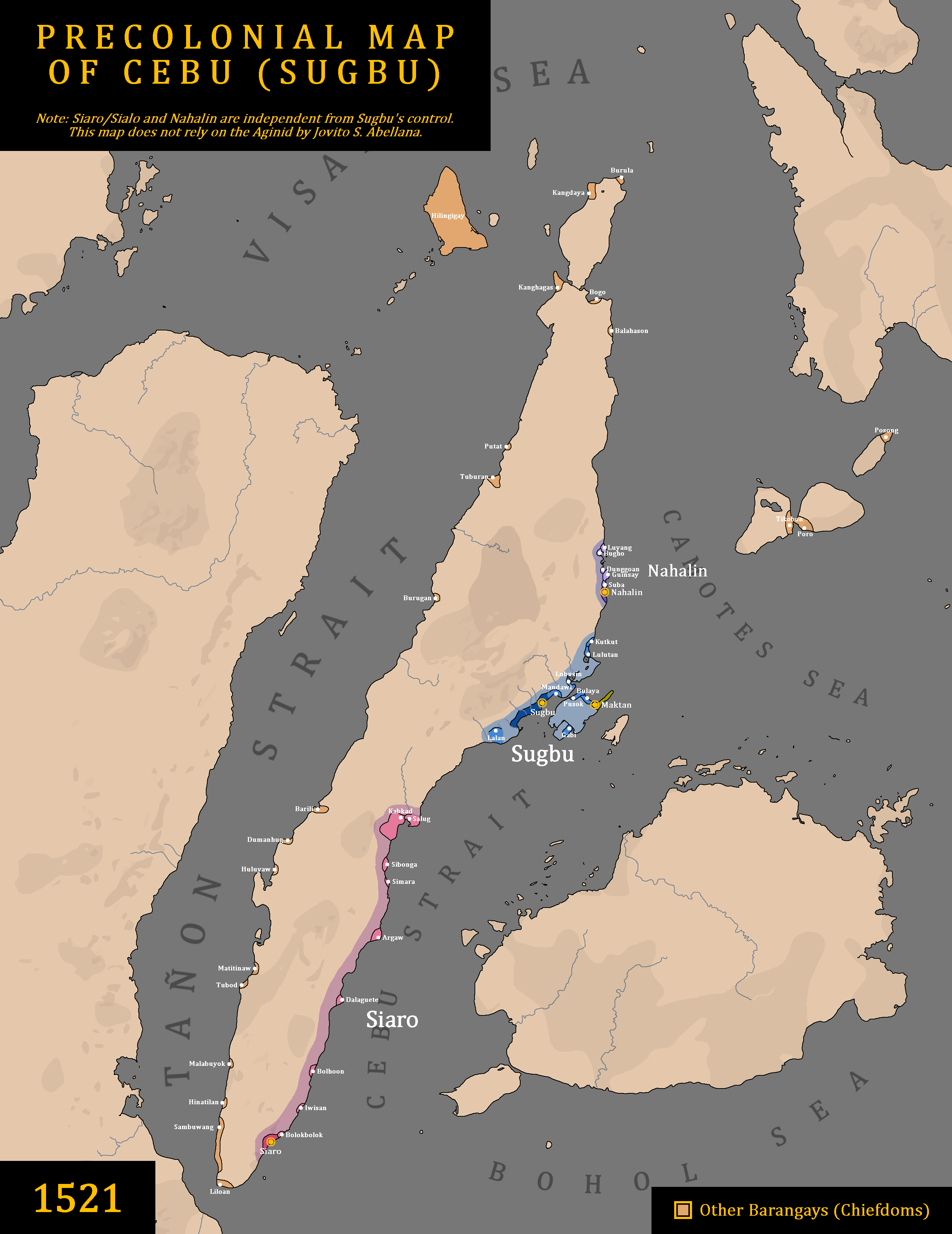

San Remigio was formerly known as Kanghagas, a kind of tree that grew in abundance in the area. When the Spanish conquistadores arrived, they identified a town site by clearing the kanghagas trees. At the time, Kanghagas was part of barangay Punta.

Initially, the chapel of ease (visita) of Kanghagas was under the jurisdiction of Bantayan. In 1850, the town of Bogo established a parish and took over civil governance of the three barrios of Kanghagas, Lambusan, and Victoria (formerly Maraat). Later, barangay Kanghagas was renamed Isabel after the Queen Isabela II of Spain, but was eventually changed in 1863 to its permanent name, San Remigio. The name San Remigio can be found in San Remigio, Florence, an Italian church from in the 1100s and later rebuilt in the 1300s. In 1864, San Remigio and other barrios established their own parish, San Juan Nepomuceno.

The town sustained extensive damage during the 2025 Cebu earthquake on September 30; 22 of the 72 deaths recorded came from San Remigio.

== Geography ==
San Remigio is bordered to the north by Medellin, to the west is Tañon Strait then Bantayan Island, to the east is the City of Bogo and the town of Tabogon, and to the south is Tabuelan. It is 108 kilometres (67 mi) from Cebu City.

=== Barangays ===
San Remigio is politically subdivided into 27 barangays. Each barangay consists of puroks and some have sitios.

PSGC	Barangay	Population			±% p.a.	
		2024		2010		
072243001	Anapog	2.9%	1,951	1,816	▴	0.50%
072243002	Argawanon	6.1%	4,118	3,996	▴	0.21%
072243003	Bagtic	1.6%	1,078	934	▴	1.00%
072243004	Bancasan	2.4%	1,644	1,423	▴	1.01%
072243005	Batad	2.2%	1,488	1,377	▴	0.54%
072243006	Busogon	2.3%	1,592	1,445	▴	0.67%
072243007	Calambua	2.1%	1,450	1,350	▴	0.50%
072243008	Canagahan	2.2%	1,489	1,377	▴	0.54%
072243009	Dapdap	2.7%	1,825	1,415	▴	1.78%
072243010	Gawaygaway	2.1%	1,423	1,426	▾	−0.01%
072243011	Hagnaya	6.1%	4,127	3,527	▴	1.10%
072243012	Kayam	2.0%	1,350	1,307	▴	0.22%
072243013	Kinawahan	1.3%	869	896	▾	−0.21%
072243014	Lambusan	3.7%	2,495	2,158	▴	1.01%
072243015	Lawis	1.8%	1,251	1,079	▴	1.03%
072243016	Libaong	1.8%	1,213	1,132	▴	0.48%
072243017	Looc	3.2%	2,201	2,021	▴	0.59%
072243018	Luyang	3.5%	2,343	2,152	▴	0.59%
072243019	Mano	5.5%	3,698	3,179	▴	1.06%
072243020	Poblacion	7.9%	5,356	4,309	▴	1.52%
072243021	Punta	4.7%	3,174	2,659	▴	1.24%
072243022	Sab‑a	1.5%	1,045	1,169	▾	−0.78%
072243023	San Miguel	2.5%	1,706	1,568	▴	0.59%
072243024	Tacup	3.5%	2,354	2,269	▴	0.26%
072243025	Tambongon	4.6%	3,100	2,727	▴	0.89%
072243026	To‑ong	1.9%	1,307	1,163	▴	0.81%
072243027	Victoria	2.8%	1,910	1,520	▴	1.60%
	Total		67,850	51,394	▴	1.95%

=== Climate ===
Climate data for San Remigio, Cebu
Month	Jan	Feb	Mar	Apr	May	Jun	Jul	Aug	Sep	Oct	Nov	Dec	Year
Mean daily maximum °C (°F)	28 (82)	29 (84)	29 (84)	30 (86)	30 (86)	30 (86)	29 (84)	29 (84)	29 (84)	29 (84)	29 (84)	29 (84)	29 (84)
Mean daily minimum °C (°F)	22 (72)	22 (72)	22 (72)	23 (73)	25 (77)	25 (77)	25 (77)	25 (77)	25 (77)	24 (75)	24 (75)	23 (73)	24 (75)
Average precipitation mm (inches)	78 (3.1)	57 (2.2)	84 (3.3)	79 (3.1)	118 (4.6)	181 (7.1)	178 (7.0)	169 (6.7)	172 (6.8)	180 (7.1)	174 (6.9)	128 (5.0)	1,598 (62.9)
Average rainy days	16.7	13.8	17.3	18.5	23.2	26.5	27.1	26.0	26.4	27.5	24.6	21.0	268.6
Source: Meteoblue

== Demographics ==
Population census of San Remigio
Year	Pop.	±% p.a.
1903	9,813	—
1918	17,141	+3.79%
1939	21,232	+1.02%
1948	20,645	−0.31%
1960	24,113	+1.30%
1970	25,569	+0.59%
1975	26,689	+0.86%
1980	29,412	+1.96%
1990	36,124	+2.08%
1995	38,501	+1.20%
2000	44,028	+2.92%
2007	48,516	+1.35%
2010	51,394	+2.12%
2015	57,557	+2.18%
2020	65,744	+2.84%
2024	67,850	+0.76%
Source: Philippine Statistics Authority

== Economy ==
Poverty incidence of San Remigio (%)

Source: Philippine Statistics Authority

== Tourism ==
San Remigio has the longest shoreline of any municipality in Cebu. There are several beach resorts, as well as public beaches with long stretches of white sand and warm ocean. Beach Resorts in San Remigio include Casa Del Mar Beach Resort, Elegant Beach Resort, San Remigio Beach Club, and Hagnaya Beach Resort.

One significant destination in San Remigio is the Replica de Capelinha de Fatima located in Barangay Tacup, 13 kilometers drive from the Poblacion. The first replica in Asia and only in the Philippines.

Today, San Remigio has become a swimming and diving destination. There are a few marine sanctuaries, with new dive sites being developed. A PADI dive shop in San Remigio Beach Club caters to beginner and experienced divers who want to enjoy San Remigio's marine life.

The port of Hagnaya offers a frequent ferry service to Santa Fe and Bantayan Island as well as Masbate (particularly Cawayan and Placer).

== Education ==
The town of San Remigio has many public and private elementary and secondary schools.

University / College
  - Cebu Technological University – San Remigio Extension Campus
Secondary Schools
  - Argawanon Integrated National High School
  - Dapdap National High School
  - Jose Martinez Memorial (Gawaygaway) National High School
  - Lambusan National High School
  - Libaong National High School
  - Luyang National High School
  - San Miguel National High School
  - San Remigio National High School
Integrated Schools
  - Argawanon
  - Anapog
  - Batad
  - Busogon
  - Calambua
  - Kinawahan
  - Tambongon
Private Schools
  - Living Hope Baptist Christian School
  - San Remigio Learning Center

== Churches ==
There are many churches that hold services throughout the week and weekends.

Churches
  - The Church of Jesus Christ of Latter Day Saints - Sunday service at 9 a.m.
  - San Juan Nepomuceno Catholic Church (daily mass)
  - Bible Baptist Church
  - Living Hope Baptist Church
  - Iglesia ni Cristo
  - Seventh Day Adventist
  - Northwest House of Hope Fellowship
  - Mano Baptist Church
  - Punta Baptist Church
Mosques
  - Cebu Madinah Mosque
  - Al Hajja Safia Mosque

== Notable events ==
Archaeological excavation in 2012 by archaeologist Jojo Bersales and his team. With permission from the archdiocese of Cebu and other authorities, his team conducted an excavation and unearthed a burial site that is believed to date back in the 1500s. Alongside human skeletons were carinated pots. These pots with flat designs and rounded base were a sign of the iron era. They were mainly intended for burial rituals and not for cooking as evidenced by their fragile design and quality. Each burial site with human remains had a carinated pot next to it. Back in the day, people believed that spirits travel through the ocean to their final resting place. These pots were filled with food for use on their travel. The archaeologists also noted that bodies were buried with their feet pointing to the ocean, affirming that ancient people believed that the final resting place was on the other side of the ocean.

== Sources ==
- Ereccion de Pueblos: 1818–1887. (This contains the Spanish and original texts of the Creation of Towns: photocopied from the National Archives)
- Sendino y Redondo, Felipe (1886). Breve reseña de lo que fue y de lo que es la Diócesis de Cebú en las Islas Filipinas (in Spanish). Manila: Colegio de Santo Tomas.
- Trota José, Regalado (2008). Curas de almas : a preliminary listing of parishes and parish priests in the 19th century Philippines based on the Guías de Forasteros, 1834-1898. UST Press. ISBN 978-9715064590.
