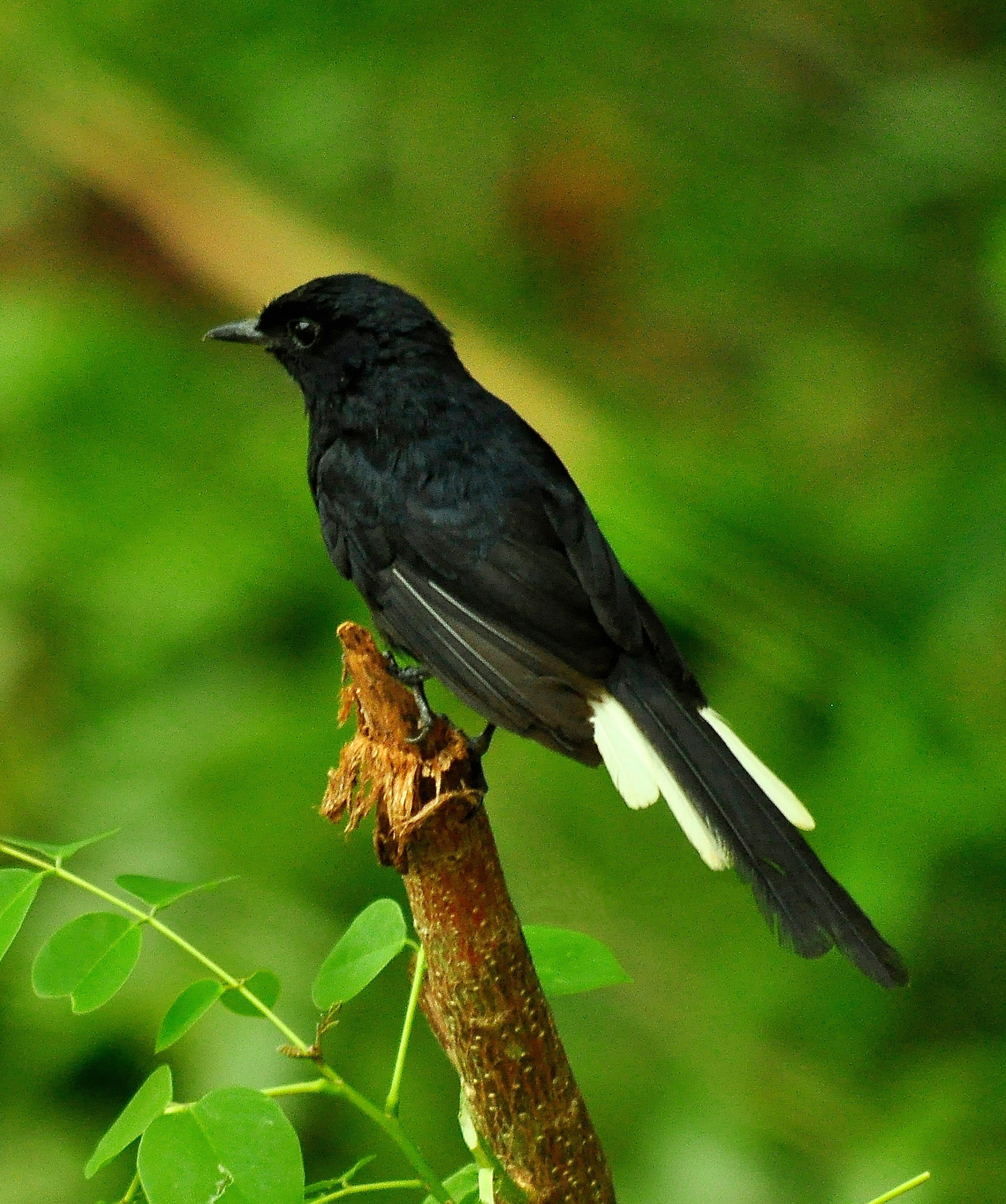

Conservation status
- Least Concern (IUCN 3.1)

Scientific classification
- Kingdom: Animalia
- Phylum: Chordata
- Class: Aves
- Order: Passeriformes
- Family: Muscicapidae
- Genus: Copsychus
- Species: C. niger

Binomial name
- Copsychus niger (Sharpe, 1877)
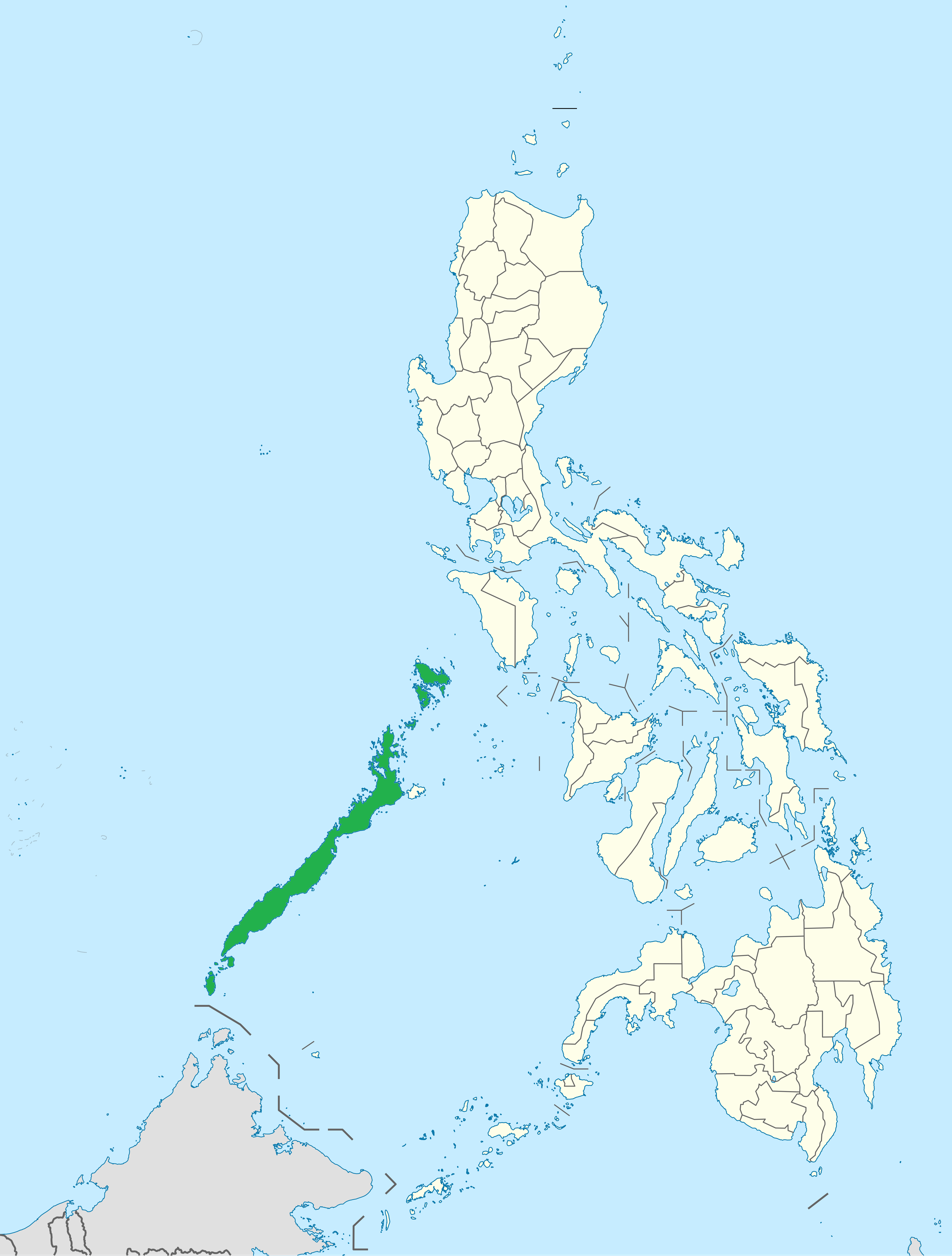

= White-vented shama =

Species of bird

The white-vented shama (Copsychus niger) is a species of bird in the chat and flycatcher family Muscicapidae. It is endemic to the Palawan, Balabac and Calamian islands in the Philippines. Along with the Black shama, White-browed shama and Visayan shama are the four endemic shamas of the country.

== Description and taxonomy ==
The species is sometimes placed in the genus Kittacincla, and is the sister species to the black shama of Cebu.

== Ecology and behavior ==
Not much is known about its diet but it is presumed to be similar to most shamas which are insectivores. Usually seen in pairs foraging close to the forest floor or thickets with a lot of tangled vines.

Breeding season is not well known. Birds with enlarged gonads collected in June. A fledgling has been recorded in August.

== Habitat and conservation status ==
Its habitat is primary lowland forest, second growth and thick scrub.

It is assessed as least-concern species under the International Union for Conservation of Nature with the population decreasing. Palawan's forests are under threat due to illegal logging, deforestation, land conversion and mining. The whole of Palawan was designated as a Biosphere Reserve; however, protection and enforcement of laws has been difficult and these threats still continue. It occurs in just one protected area in the Iwahig Prison and Penal Farm.
