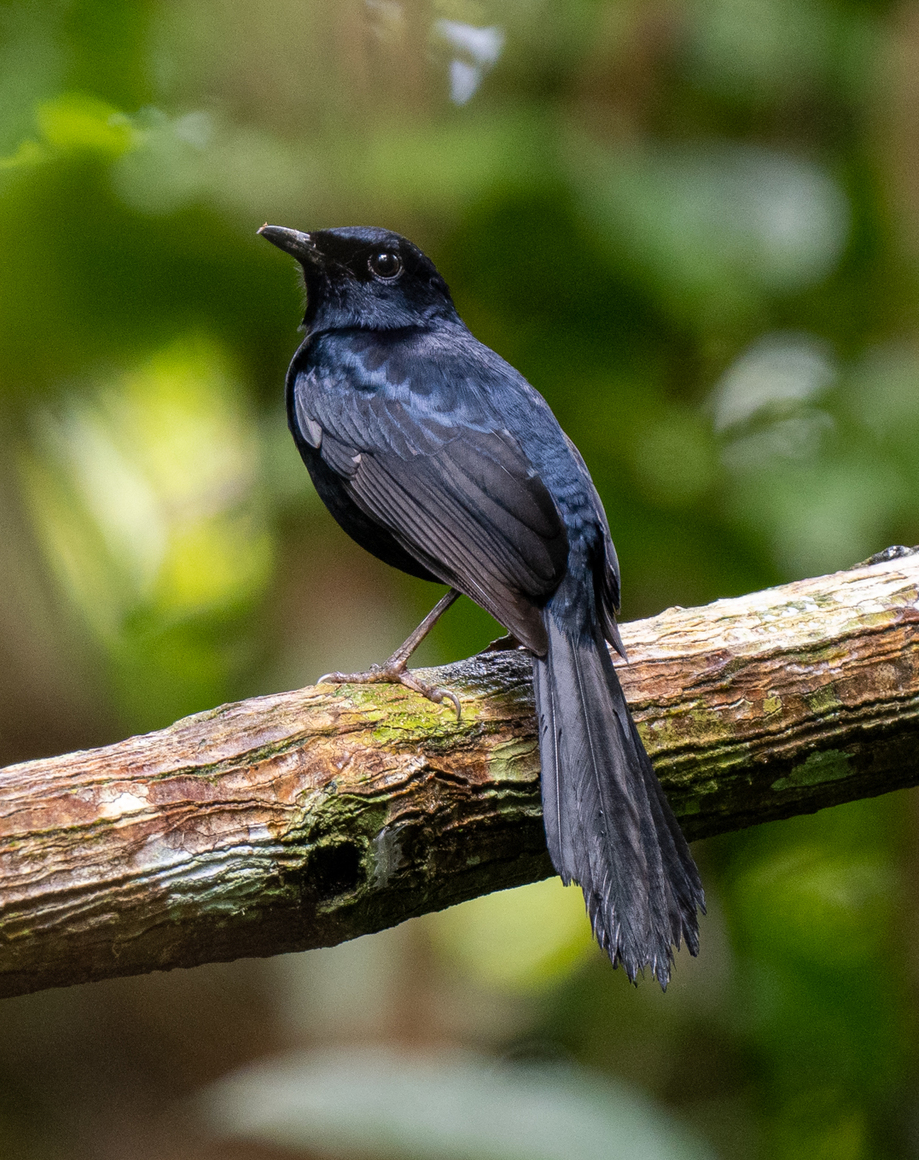

Conservation status
- Least Concern (IUCN 3.1)

Scientific classification
- Kingdom: Animalia
- Phylum: Chordata
- Class: Aves
- Order: Passeriformes
- Family: Muscicapidae
- Genus: Copsychus
- Species: C. cebuensis

Binomial name
- Copsychus cebuensis (Steere, 1890)
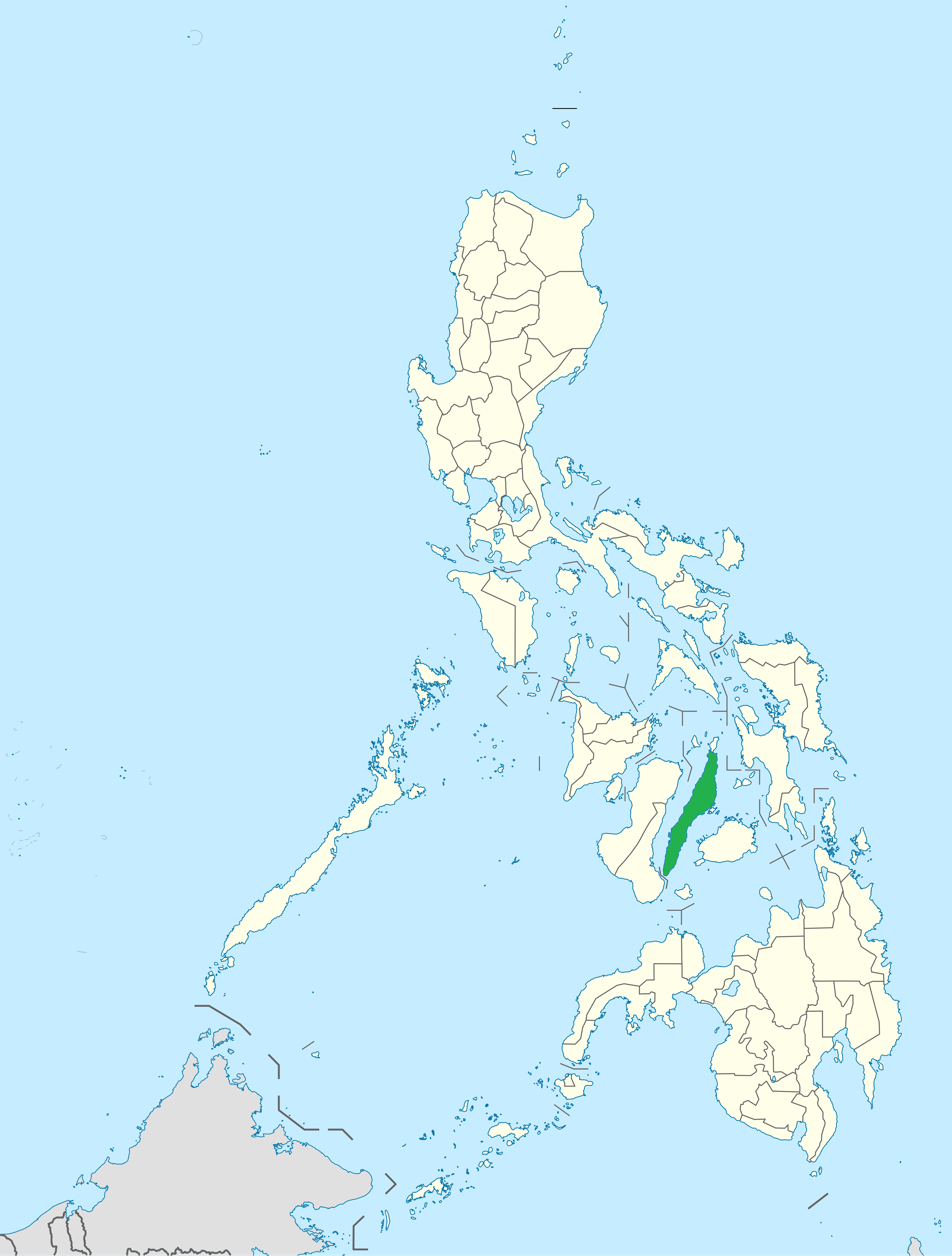

Synonyms
- Kittacincla cebuensis

= Black shama =

Species of bird

The Black shama (Copsychus cebuensis) is a species of bird in the family Muscicapidae. It is endemic to the island of Cebu, Philippines where it is known locally as "Siloy".

Its natural habitats are tropical moist lowland forest, tropical moist shrubland, and plantations. It has been sighted in several locations all across the island, the most important sites being the Central Cebu Protected Landscape, the forests of Alcoy and Argao, and the shrublands of Casili, Consolacion. It is threatened by habitat loss.

== Ecology and behavior ==
Stomach contents of species contained beetles. This species is believed to be an insectivore. Usually seen in pairs foraging close to the forest floor or thickets with a lot of tangled vines.

Breeding season is February to September. Nest is cup shaped and typically found in bamboo. Lays to 2 to 3 eggs.

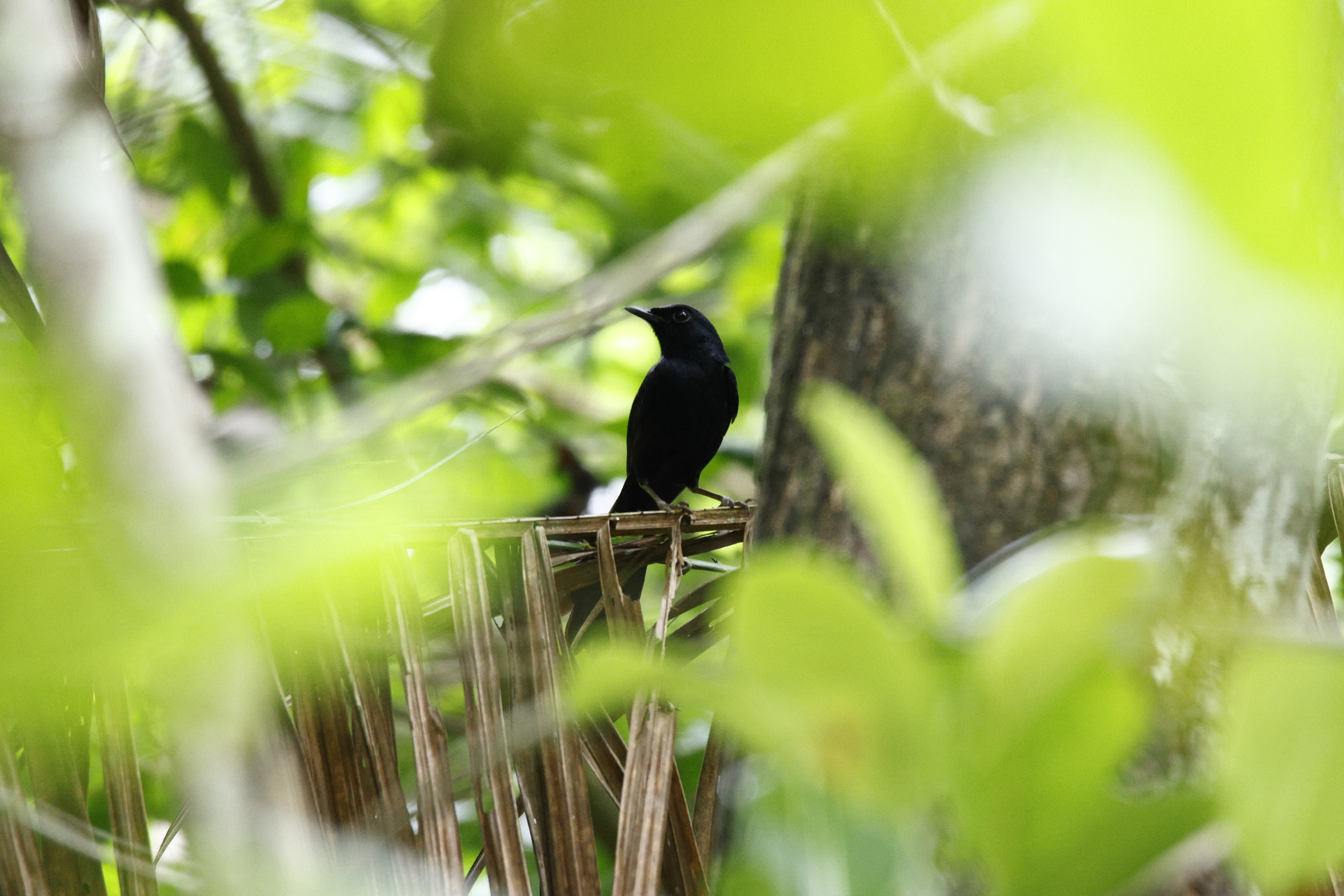
Photo of a Black Shama in Buhisan, Cebu City. July 2026

== Habitat and conservation status ==
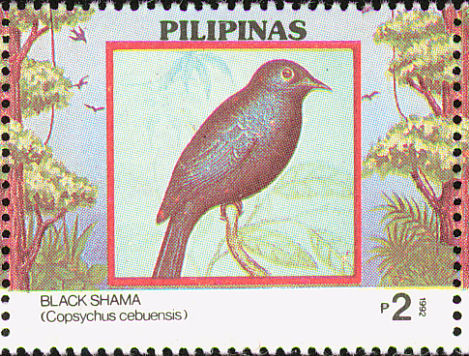
A Black shama featured on the 1992 Philippine stamp.

Its natural habitats are tropical moist lowland primary forest and secondary forests . It is also seen in clearings and plantations as long as there is dense undergrowth. An ongoing radio-tracking study found that the breeding territory in forest-edge habitats was 0.2-0.5 km^{2}.

The IUCN Red List formerly classified this bird as an endangered species with population estimates of 670 to 3,300 mature individuals with the belief that its population is near the lower estimate of that range. This species' main threat is habitat loss with wholesale clearance of forest habitats as a result of legal and illegal logging, mining and conversion into farmlands through Slash-and-burn and urbanization. Cebu underwent severe deforestation in the 1890s and now just 0.03% or 15 km^{2} (5.8 sq mi) of forest cover remains. Up until today, the forests of Cebu still receive hunting pressure and deforestation — further reducing what little there is remaining.

In 2023, this species was downlisted to a least-concern species based on a new estimate of 10,000 to 16,500 birds and an apparent tolerance for secondary habitat. However, this estimate assumes as many as 350 birds per square kilometer in Alcoy. These figures are in urgent need of more study

This has led to many other species sharing its range to also be endangered. It shares habitat with the Cebu flowerpecker, which is one of the most endangered birds in the world and also other endangered species such as the Cebu brown dove, Cebu hawk-owl and Streak-breasted bulbul. This has led to many local extinctions of species such as Cebu warty pig and possibly Cebu amethyst brown dove and local extinctions of Philippine oriole, Blackish cuckooshrike, Bar-bellied cuckooshrike and Philippine hanging parrot.

The black shama occurs in Alcoy, Argao, Dalaguete, Tabunan and Boljoon protected forests, but actual protection and enforcement is lax. The area where the Black Shama's last stronghold is located is known as the Mag-abo Rainforest, a dense patch of forest and one of the biodiversity hotspots of the Nug-as Rainforest System, together with Lantoy Mountain.

== Cultural Symbolism ==
The Siloy Bird is an important cultural symbol of the town of Alcoy, Cebu, as well as local Cebuano biodiversity. The Black Shama, as well as the other endemic species of Cebu are considered as eco-tourism attractions in Alcoy. Every last Saturday of August, the town celebrates the Siloy Festival in honor of its patron, St. Rose of Lima. The Siloy Festival is a religious and eco-cultural event that is a thanksgiving to God for the Siloy of Alcoy and the biodiversity of the Nug-as Rainforest System.

The Siloy Bird is the official mascot of Cebu Daily News, a local Cebuano news outlet from the Inquirer Group of Companies. The news outlet uses the term "Siloy" as a metaphor for anyone in Cebu that is on the lookout for current events and happenings.
