= Wilfredo Caminero =

Filipino politician (born 1954)

The Honorable Wilfredo Caminero

Member of the Philippine House of Representatives from Cebu's 2nd district
- In office June 30, 2013 – June 30, 2022
- Preceded by: Pablo P. Garcia
- Succeeded by: Edsel Galeos

Member of the Cebu Provincial Board from Cebu's 2nd district
- In office June 30, 2007 – June 30, 2013

Mayor of Argao
- In office June 30, 1998 – June 30, 2007
- Preceded by: Daniel Sesaldo
- Succeeded by: Edsel A. Galeos

Vice Mayor of Argao
- In office June 30, 1992 – June 30, 1998

Municipal Councilor of Argao
- In office February 2, 1988 – June 30, 1992

Personal details
- Born: Wilfredo Sardido Caminero; October 12, 1954 (age 72) Argao, Cebu
- Party: NUP (2016–present)
- Other political affiliations: Liberal (2010–2016); Lakas (before 2010)
- Profession: Farmer; Politician

Wilfredo "Willy" Sardido Caminero (born October 12, 1954) is a Filipino politician who served as the representative for the 2nd district of Cebu from 2013 to 2022. He served as mayor of Argao, Cebu from 1998 to 2007 and as member of the Cebu Provincial Board representing the 2nd district from 2007 to 2013.

== Political career ==
=== Mayor of Argao (1998–2007) ===
Caminero started his political career after winning as a municipal councilor of Argao in the 1988 elections. He went on to become the town's vice mayor from 1992 to 1998 and later won as mayor in the 1998 elections.

=== Cebu Provincial Board (2007–2013) ===
Caminero ran for board member of Cebu's 2nd district in the 2007 elections and went on to be re-elected for two consecutive terms serving until 2013.

=== House of Representatives (2013–2022) ===
Caminero ran for representative of Cebu's 2nd district in the 2013 elections. He defeated incumbent Pablo P. Garcia, who previously served as Governor of Cebu. He also won against Teresita Celis in 2016 and Ronald Allan Cesante in 2019.

He is currently serving as the Chairperson of the Special Committee on Food Security and the Vice Chairperson of the Committee on Agriculture and Food.

== Electoral history ==
=== House of Representatives ===
2013 Philippine House of Representatives election at Cebu's 2nd district
Party	Candidate	Votes	%
Liberal	Wilfredo Caminero	84,256	40.88
NUP	Pablo Garcia	77,625	37.66
Independent	Simeon Kintanar	8,607	4.18
Valid ballots		170,488	82.69
Invalid or blank votes		35,619	17.28
Total votes		206,107	100.00
Liberal gain from NUP			

2016 Philippine House of Representatives election in Cebu's 2nd District
Party	Candidate	Votes	%
Liberal	Wilfredo Caminero	80,283	81.5
1CEBU	Teresita Celis	10,881	11.0
UNA	Cora Lou Kintanar	7,384	7.5
Total votes		98,548	100.00

2019 Philippine House of Representatives election in Cebu's 2nd District
Party	Candidate	Votes	%
NUP	Wilfredo Caminero	66,166	56.45
PDP–Laban	Ronald Allan Cesante	48,918	41.73
UNA	Cora Lou Kintanar	2,125	1.81
Total votes		117,209	100.00
