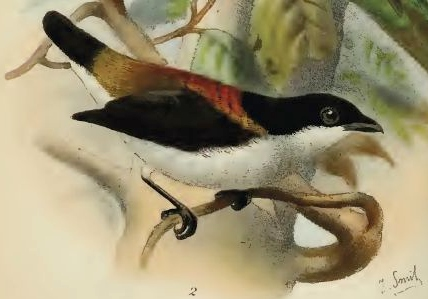
- By Joseph Smit

Conservation status
- Critically Endangered (IUCN 3.1)

Scientific classification
- Kingdom: Animalia
- Phylum: Chordata
- Class: Aves
- Order: Passeriformes
- Family: Dicaeidae
- Genus: Dicaeum
- Species: D. quadricolor

Binomial name
- Dicaeum quadricolor (Tweeddale, 1878)

= Cebu flowerpecker =

Species of bird

The Cebu flowerpecker (Dicaeum quadricolor) is a small passerine bird. It is endemic to Cebu Island in the Philippines. Feared to have become extinct early in the 20th century, it was rediscovered in 1992 in a small patch of limestone forest in Tabunan in the Central Cebu Protected Landscape It has since been claimed to be found at three other sites, namely the Nug-as forest of Alcoy, Mount Lantoy of Argao and the forests of Dalaguete. However, the only definitive proof of this bird was in its original area of discovery in Tabunan where footage of a male was captured in 1997.

While sightings and claims until the 2000s were supposedly frequent in Tabunan, this species became rarer and rarer and some now believe that this species is now extinct. This species is still reported on eBird with a possible recording in 2024 and a claimed sighting.

The main threat to this species is habitat loss. Cebu is the most deforested major island in the Philippines with only 0.3% of remaining forest cover. Majority of the sightings and the only truly verified sighting was in Tabunan which is less than 100 hectares (1sq km). Larger patches of forest exist with claimed records namely Alcoy which is around 600 hectares (6 sq km). WIth how tiny the remaining potential habitat is, this species is especially sensitve to storms which have since destroyed the last few remaining large trees.

== Description ==
This four-colored bird normally grows to 11 or 12 centimeters (4.3 or 4.7 in). The male is characterized by a large, triangular, scarlet to vermilion coat stain. The lower back is ochre with green approach. Back, neck, head and sides of neck, wings and tail are glossy blue-black. The underside is pale yellow. Chin, belly center, armpits, under tail-coverts, and under wing-coverts are white. The edges are blurred light olive.

In the female, the top is brown. The head is slightly faded olive, the back, the wing-coverts and outer webs of secondaries are strongly washed out olive. The rump is almost entirely olive-yellow. The underside is white with a faint gray olive-yellow approach that is brighter towards the center of the chest and abdomen. The under wing-coverts, shoulders and inner webs of the quills are white.

== Status ==
The Cebu flowerpecker is a critically endangered breeding bird. It was feared to have become extinct early in the 20th century after the clearance of most of the island's forests, but was rediscovered in 1992 in a small patch of limestone forest in the Central Cebu Protected Landscape and has since been found at three other sites, namely, the Nug-as forest of Alcoy, Mount Lantoy of Argao and the forests of Dalaguete. The rediscovery of the Cebu flowerpecker along with historical evidence of primary forest where it had been thought none remained suggests that Cebu and eight of its endemic birds were written off too early. Other possible sites for this species are in Malabuyoc. The current population is estimated to be between 85 and 105.

== Habitat ==
The Cebu Flowerpecker is known to inhabit the Tabunan Forest, the Babayungan Forest in Dalaguete, and the Nug-as Forest in Alcoy on the island of Cebu in the Philippines. The Cebu Flowerpecker is commonly found in the closed forest canopy and near flowering or fruiting plants; these areas are located in the interior and outskirt ranges of the forests.

== Diet ==
The Cebu Flowerpecker consumes small fruits and mistletoe plants to get its energy; these mistletoe plants are ideal for many birds in Cebu because they are abundant and bear fruits and flowers on a monthly basis. The endemic Cebu Mistletoe, Lepeostegeres cebuensis, that it has been seen feeding on most varies from other common mistletoe plants in its ridges of orange-brown scales on the young leaves and internodes. It is a light green color and blossoms needle-like pink flowers about 4 millimeters long in clusters which are a great source of food for the Cebu Flowerpecker.

== Behavior ==
While most diurnal birds tend to be active very early in the morning, the Cebu flowerpecker differs. Because the species is known to be bullied by other aggressive birds such as the Red-Striped Flowerpecker, it chooses to be active between 9 am to 1 pm, after the busiest time of the day, in order to avoid these more competitive species. When foraging, it tends to fly quickly to its preferred flowering plant, feed, and then promptly fly away immediately after. Although the Cebu flowerpecker rarely calls, its sound is similar to the Pygmy flowerpecker's call.

== Threats ==
The Cebu Flowerpecker is currently categorized as critically endangered on the IUCN red list. Many threats are known to impact the Cebu Flowerpecker with varying degrees. As of 2019, recent threat analysis in the Philippines considers the impact of anthropogenic activities which include deforestation, hunting, and expansion of infrastructure. The highest intensity threat includes deforestation for the purposes of agricultural development and resource collection by local villagers in the Tabunan Forest; deforestation severely reduces the available food, shelter, and breeding habitats. The next critical-level threat includes road development, in Nug-as forest in Alcoy, which leads to severe habitat fragmentation. Due to reduced resources, there are increased levels of direct-competition between the Cebu Flowerpecker and other endemic species of the Nug-as Forest; this species is at high risk of being outcompeted. Other lower-level threats may include invasive species, mining, climate change (e.g. flooding, storms).

While native, the Red-keeled flowerpecker has been theorized to outcompete these birds as they are much more adaptable to habitat disturbance and seem to be much more aggressive.

== Conservation ==
The habitat of the Cebu Flowerpecker has been reduced to 1000 hectares. Current conservation efforts include the Biodiversity Conservation Awareness, habitat restoration, biodiversity management, and protection by Central Cebu Protected Landscape, and the establishment of the Critical Habitat. The Tabunan forest is located within the boundaries of the Central Cebu National Park; however, there are increased occurrences of illegal use of Tabunan forest resources. Conservationists are pushing for the implementation of education and awareness programs in Cebu, as the local villagers largely contribute to habitat reduction and resource depletion.
