= Buhisan Dam =

Dam in Cebu City, Philippines

- Location in Cebu Location in the Visayas Location in the Philippines
- Country: Philippines
- Location: Cebu City
- Coordinates: 10°18′49″N 123°50′55″E
- Status: Operational
- Construction began: 1911
- Opening date: 1912

Buhisan Dam is a dam located in Buhisan, Cebu City, Philippines. It is one of the main sources of water for Cebu City and Metro Cebu. Part of Central Cebu Protected Landscape, Buhisan Dam is situated in the mountains of Barangay Buhisan behind Labangon, Cebu. Built in 1911-1912 and maintained by the Metro Cebu Water District, it is being developed into an eco-tourism location. It supplies five percent of Metropolitan Cebu Water District's (MCWD) current water capacity.

== History ==
Because of the lack of potable water in Cebu, a cholera outbreak began to spread in the early 1900s which killed 559 people, or about 1% of the population of the city, which then had a population of 55,000. A destructive fire in 1906 which destroyed millions worth of properties also proved the need of enough water supply for Cebu. Buhisan Dam was built to address devastating fires that could again hit the city, and the need for a safe water supply during a cholera outbreak.

The dam was first proposed by the Speaker of the Philippine Assembly, Sergio Osmeña Sr. Osmeña then worked hard to obtain support from the Insular Government for various infrastructure projects in Cebu, and one of these was the Buhisan Dam.

The American Governor-General William Cameron Forbes supported Osmeña's proposed project, and helped secure the P550,000 funds for the construction and completion of the Dam. Forbes issued an executive order designating 5,590,000 square meters of land in Labangon for the proposed watershed and reservoir.

As early as 1909, American engineer Eusebius Julius Halsema mapped the contours of the entire watershed. The young Halsema (for whom the Halsema Highway was named) was appointed by the Bureau of Public Works to supervise the Cebu waterworks. Marcelo Veloso Regner, an engineer from Cebu, was Halsema's assistant. The dam was then named Osmeña Waterworks. In order to celebrate this breakthrough, a water fountain was then built, which would now be known as the Fuente Osmeña Circle, which was also named after the speaker who proposed the waterworks.

In 2011, Buhisan Dam celebrated its centennial. In August 2013, there was concern about silting at the dam, which was at risk of overflowing. One source reported that silting had reduced the dam's water capacity from 10,000 cubic meters per day to 6,000 cubic meters per day. After flooding in 2013, safety concerns were raised regarding the dam. MCWD officials state that the dam is stable, but needs to be desilted so it can hold more water. A primitive warning bell, essentially consisting of "an oxygen tank and a steel rod to hit it with" is being used to alert residents of the barangay of Buhisan to evacuate in the event that rising water levels reach the top of the dam.

The endangered "Cebu small worm skink" (Brachymeles cebuensis) may live near the dam.

== See also ==
- Water supply and sanitation in the Philippines
- Energy in the Philippines
- Halsema Highway
- Jaclupan Talisay Dam
