= Central Cebu Protected Landscape =

Nature reserve in the Philippines

- IUCN category V (protected landscape/seascape)
- The protected landscape area of Central Cebu with the Pit-os campus of Cebu International School in the foreground

- Location within Philippines
- Location: Cebu, Philippines
- Nearest city: Cebu City
- Coordinates: 10°30′33″N 123°49′34″E
- Area: 29,062 hectares (71,810 acres)
- Established: September 15, 1937 (National park); August 12, 2003 (Protected landscape)
- Governing body: Department of Environment and Natural Resources

The Central Cebu Protected Landscape (CCPL) is a protected area located in the mountains and drainage basins of central Cebu in the Philippines.

The CCPL covers what used to be known as the Central Cebu National Park, Buhisan Dam, Mananga Watershed Forest Reserve, Kotkot-Lusuran Watershed Forest Reserve, and the Sudlon National Park. The protected area spans 29,062 hectares (71,810 acres) of adjoining forestlands and watersheds located in the middle of the province. It covers parts of the central Cebu cities of Cebu City, Toledo, Talisay, and Danao, and the municipalities of Balamban, Minglanilla, Consolacion, Liloan and Compostela.

The CCPL houses many of Cebu's endemic and indigenous species. The CCPL is also home to several threatened species, such as the Cebu flowerpecker, black shama, the Cebu cinnamon tree (Cinnamomum cebuense), a rare new kind of orchid, the streak-breasted bulbul, the rufous-lored kingfisher, and the Philippine tube-nosed fruit bat among others. It is in this area where the critically endangered Cebu flowerpecker was rediscovered in 1992. The area is also home to the newly opened Kan-irag Nature Park.

In 2011, the Department of Environment and Natural Resources (DENR 7) planned to conduct a census and registration of residents of the 22 barangays in the reserve. It also filed a criminal complaint against two individuals for cutting trees in the reserve. In 2009, DENR officials had stated that "they are worried that if the forest reserves in Cebu will be destroyed because there are people living there, there will be a water crisis in the province."

== See also ==
- Buhisan Dam
- Cebu flowerpecker
- Black shama
