= Philippine House Special Committee on Food Security =

Special committee of the House of Representatives of the Philippines

Special Committee on Food Security
- 20th Congress

History
- New session started: July 28, 2025

Leadership
- Chairman: Vacant since June 30, 2025
- Minority Leader: Vacant since June 30, 2025

Website
- Special Committee on Food Security

The Philippine House Special Committee on Food Security is a special committee of the Philippine House of Representatives.

== Jurisdiction ==
As prescribed by House Rules, the committee's jurisdiction is on programs and policies relating to food production and distribution which includes the following:

- Availability and accessibility of these commodities to the people
- Factors affecting food supply in the country
- Long-term food security for the nation
- Other actions intended to achieve sustained growth and self-reliance in the production of basic food commodities

== Members, 20th Congress ==
As of June 30, 2025, all committee membership positions are vacant.

== Historical membership rosters ==
=== 18th Congress ===
Position	Members	Party	Province/City	District
Chairperson	Wilfredo Caminero	NUP	Cebu	2nd
Vice Chairpersons	Sabiniano Canama	COOP-NATCCO	Party-list	
Vice Chairpersons	Faustino Michael Dy V	NUP	Isabela	6th
Vice Chairpersons	Jose Teves Jr.	TGP	Party-list	
Vice Chairpersons	Rogelio Pacquiao	PDP–Laban	Sarangani	Lone
Vice Chairpersons	Genaro Alvarez Jr.	NPC	Negros Occidental	6th
Members for the Majority	Alyssa Sheena Tan	PFP	Isabela	4th
Members for the Majority	Ruth Mariano-Hernandez	Independent	Laguna	2nd
Members for the Majority	Micaela Violago	NUP	Nueva Ecija	2nd
Members for the Majority	Samantha Louise Vargas-Alfonso	NUP	Cagayan	2nd
Members for the Majority	Jocelyn Fortuno	Nacionalista	Camarines Sur	5th
Members for the Majority	Rudy Caoagdan	PDP–Laban	Cotabato	2nd
Members for the Majority	Nestor Fongwan (Note: Died on December 18, 2019.)	PDP–Laban	Benguet	Lone
Members for the Minority	Francisca Castro	ACT TEACHERS	Party-list	
Members for the Minority	Argel Joseph Cabatbat	MAGSASAKA	Party-list	

== See also ==
- House of Representatives of the Philippines
- List of Philippine House of Representatives committees
