= Kan-irag Nature Park =

Nature park in Cebu City, Philippines

Coordinates: 10°24′07″N 123°51′40″E

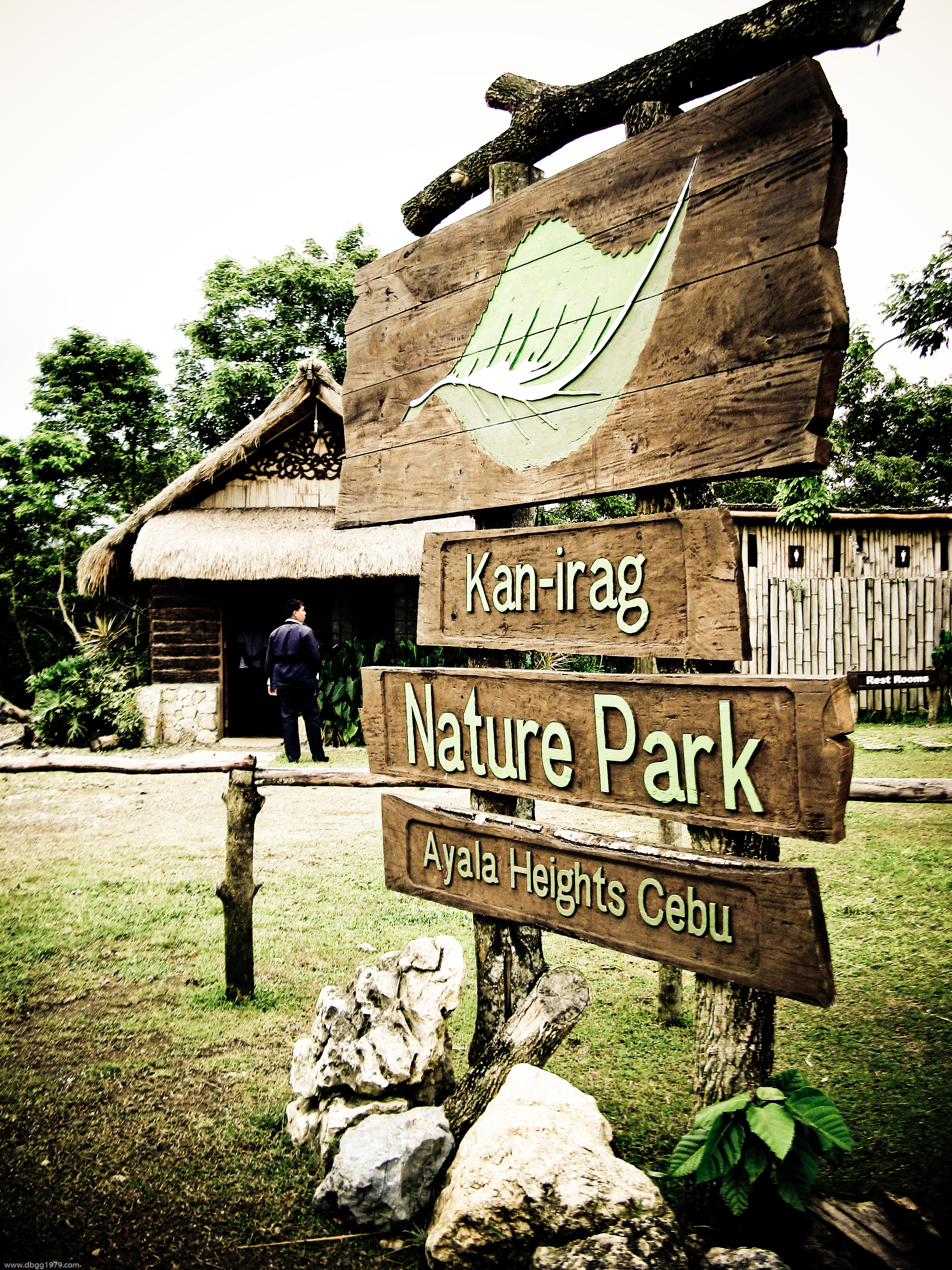
Kan-irag Nature Park welcome sign

The Kan-irag Nature Park is a watershed and nature park in the uplands of Cebu City, Philippines that opened in the mid-2000s. It was once a bald mountain, but due to reforestation with native trees, the area became a functioning watershed. It is home to about 27 native bird species, such as the emerald dove, Asian glossy starling, the collared kingfisher, the black-naped oriole, and the olive-backed sunbird. The park's size is 71 hectares (180 acres).

Kan-irag Nature Park is located in the mountain barangay of Pung-ol-Sibugay, adjacent to the barangay of Sirao and near Mount Kan-Irag. The park is part of the Central Cebu Protected Landscape and is situated right in the heart of the Kotkot River watershed. Previously a bald stretch, the 71-hectare property was successfully ‘saved’ by Ayala Land, Incorporated. In cooperation with other non-government organizations, Ayala Land, Inc. developed this piece of land after scrapping its initial plans of turning it into a golf course.

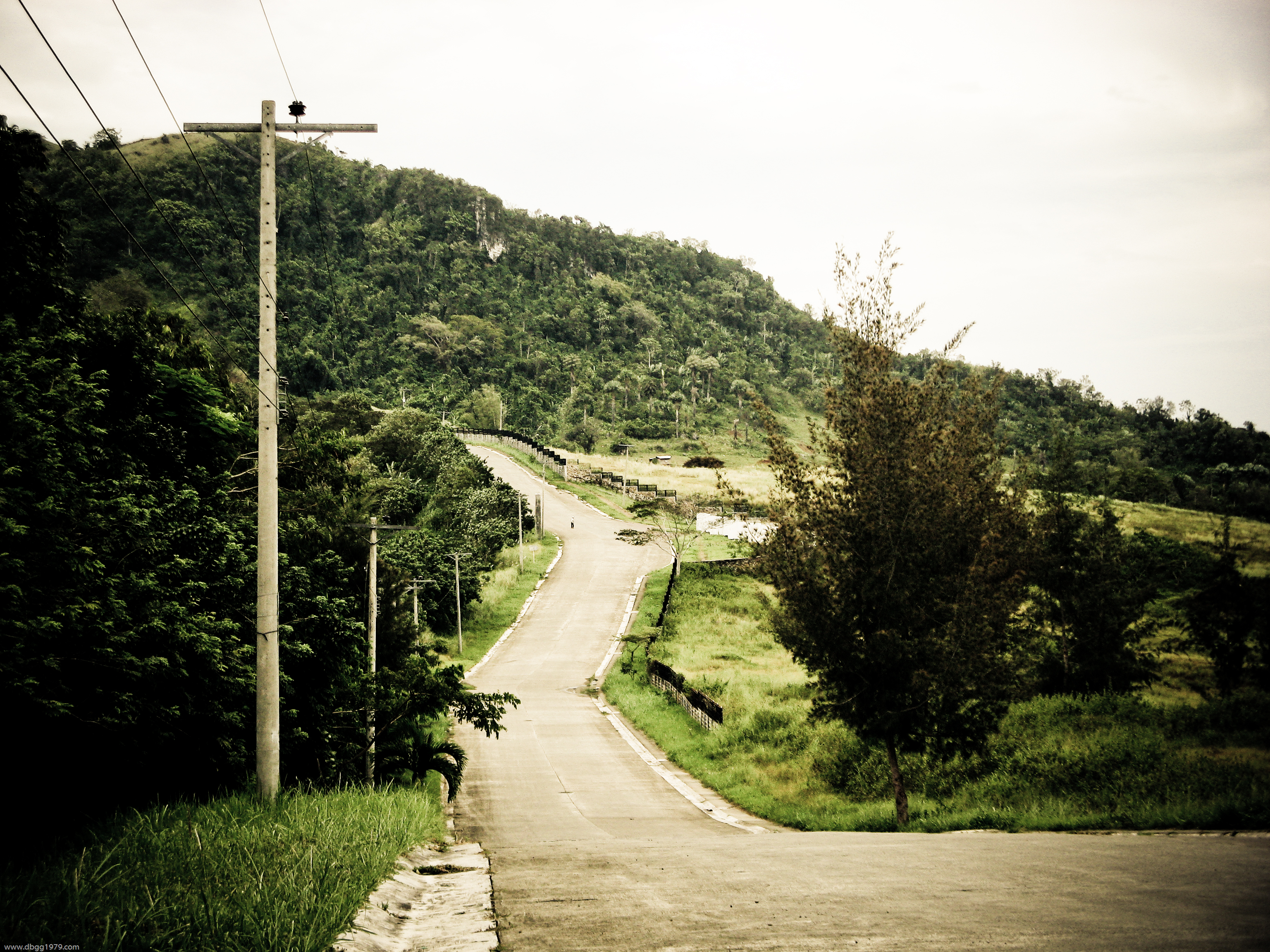
Kan-irag Nature Park

== See also ==
- Central Cebu Protected Landscape
