= Cebu's 2nd congressional district =

Legislative district of the Philippines

- Constituency for the House of Representatives of the Philippines
- Boundary of Cebu's 2nd congressional district in Cebu

- Location of Cebu within the Philippines
- Province: Cebu
- Region: Central Visayas
- Population: 257,658 (2020)
- Electorate: 181,873 (2025)
- Major settlements: 7 LGUs: Municipalities; Alcoy; Argao; Boljoon; Dalaguete; Oslob; Samboan; Santander
- Area: 740.67 km^{2} (285.97 sq mi)

Current constituency
- Created: 1907
- Representative: Edsel Galeos
- Political party: Lakas; 1CEBU
- Congressional bloc: Majority

Cebu's 2nd congressional district is one of the seven congressional districts of the Philippines in the province of Cebu. It has been represented in the House of Representatives of the Philippines since 1916 and earlier in the Philippine Assembly from 1907 to 1916. The district consists of the southern Cebu municipalities of Alcoy, Argao, Boljoon, Dalaguete, Oslob, Samboan and Santander. It is currently represented in the 20th Congress by Edsel Galeos of the Lakas–CMD (Lakas) and One Cebu (1CEBU).

The district served as an electoral district in the 1934 Constitutional Convention, electing two delegates, and in the 1971 Constitutional Convention, electing four delegates.

Prior to its second dissolution in 1972, the district encompassed the cities of Cebu, Lapu-Lapu, and Mandaue, and the eastern municipalities of Compostela, Consolacion, Cordova, and Liloan. The southwestern municipalities of Alcantara, Argao, Badian, Dumanjug, Ginatilan, Malabuyoc, Moalboal, and Ronda belonged to the district from 1987 until they were reapportioned to the re-created seventh district in 2016.

== List of members representing the district ==
=== Philippine Assembly (1907–1916) ===
Portrait	Member (Lifespan)	Term of office	Party	Legislature	Electoral history	Constituencies
District created January 9, 1907.
	Sergio Osmeña (1878–1961)	October 16, 1907 – October 16, 1916	Nacionalista	1st Legislature	Elected in 1907.	1907–1912; Cebu, Liloan, Mandaue, Opon
	Sergio Osmeña (1878–1961)	October 16, 1907 – October 16, 1916	Nacionalista	2nd Legislature	Re-elected in 1909.	1907–1912; Cebu, Liloan, Mandaue, Opon
	Sergio Osmeña (1878–1961)	October 16, 1907 – October 16, 1916	Nacionalista	3rd Legislature	Re-elected in 1912.	1912–1916; Cebu, Cordova, Liloan, Mandaue, Opon

=== House of Representatives (1916–1935) ===
Portrait	Member (Lifespan)	Term of office	Party	Legislature	Electoral history	Constituencies
	Sergio Osmeña (1878–1961)	October 16, 1916 – June 6, 1922	Nacionalista	4th Legislature	Re-elected in 1916.	1916–1919; Cebu, Cordova, Liloan, Mandaue, Opon
	Sergio Osmeña (1878–1961)	October 16, 1916 – June 6, 1922	Nacionalista	5th Legislature	Re-elected in 1919.	1919–1922; Cebu, Compostela, Cordova, Liloan, Mandaue, Opon
	Vicente Sotto (1877–1950)	June 6, 1922 – June 2, 1925	Democrata	6th Legislature	Elected in 1922.	1922–1935; Cebu, Compostela, Consolacion, Cordova, Liloan, Mandaue, Opon
	Paulino Gullas (1891–1945)	June 2, 1925 – June 5, 1928	Nacionalista Consolidado	7th Legislature	Elected in 1925.	1922–1935; Cebu, Compostela, Consolacion, Cordova, Liloan, Mandaue, Opon
	Sotero Cabahug (1891–1963)	June 5, 1928 – June 5, 1934	Nacionalista Consolidado	8th Legislature	Elected in 1928.	1922–1935; Cebu, Compostela, Consolacion, Cordova, Liloan, Mandaue, Opon
	Sotero Cabahug (1891–1963)	June 5, 1928 – June 5, 1934	Nacionalista Consolidado	9th Legislature	Re-elected in 1931.	1922–1935; Cebu, Compostela, Consolacion, Cordova, Liloan, Mandaue, Opon
	Hilario Abellana (1896–1945)	June 5, 1934 – November 15, 1935	Nacionalista Democrata Pro-Independencia	10th Legislature	Elected in 1934.	1922–1935; Cebu, Compostela, Consolacion, Cordova, Liloan, Mandaue, Opon

=== 1934 Constitutional Convention (1934–1935) ===
Seat A					Seat B					Legislature	Constituencies
Portrait	Member (Lifespan)	Term of office	Party	Electoral history	Portrait	Member (Lifespan)	Term of office	Party	Electoral history	Legislature	Constituencies
	Paulino Gullas (1891–1945)	July 30, 1934 – February 19, 1935	Nonpartisan	Elected in 1934.		Filemon Sotto (1872–1966)	July 30, 1934 – February 19, 1935	Nonpartisan	Elected in 1934.	1934 Constitutional Convention	1934–1935; Cebu, Compostela, Consolacion, Cordova, Liloan, Mandaue, Opon

=== National Assembly (1935–1945) ===
==== Commonwealth ====
Portrait	Member (Lifespan)	Term of office	Party	Legislature	Electoral history	Constituencies
	Hilario Abellana (1896–1945)	November 15, 1935 – December 30, 1941	Nacionalista Democrata Pro-Independencia	1st National Assembly	Re-elected in 1935.	1935–1938; Cebu, Compostela, Consolacion, Cordova, Liloan, Mandaue, Opon
	Hilario Abellana (1896–1945)	November 15, 1935 – December 30, 1941	Nacionalista	2nd National Assembly	Re-elected in 1938.	1938–1941; Cebu City, Compostela, Consolacion, Cordova, Liloan, Mandaue, Opon
District dissolved into the two-seat Cebu's at-large district for the Second Republic National Assembly.

=== House of Representatives (1945–1973) ===
Portrait	Member (Lifespan)	Term of office	Party	Legislature	Electoral history	Constituencies
District re-created May 24, 1945.
	Pedro T. Lopez (1906–1957)	June 9, 1945 – May 25, 1946	Nacionalista	1st Commonwealth Congress	Elected in 1941.	1945–1946; Cebu City, Compostela, Consolacion, Cordova, Liloan, Mandaue, Opon
	Vicente Logarta	May 25, 1946 – December 30, 1949	Nacionalista	2nd Commonwealth Congress	Elected in 1946.	1946–1961; Cebu City, Compostela, Consolacion, Cordova, Liloan, Mandaue, Opon
	Vicente Logarta	May 25, 1946 – December 30, 1949	Nacionalista	1st Congress	Elected in 1946.	1946–1961; Cebu City, Compostela, Consolacion, Cordova, Liloan, Mandaue, Opon
	Leandro Tojong (1905–1980)	December 30, 1949 – December 6, 1952	Liberal	2nd Congress	Elected in 1949. Election annulled by House electoral tribunal.	1946–1961; Cebu City, Compostela, Consolacion, Cordova, Liloan, Mandaue, Opon
	Vicente Logarta	January 26, 1953 – December 30, 1953	Nacionalista	2nd Congress	Declared winner of 1949 elections.	1946–1961; Cebu City, Compostela, Consolacion, Cordova, Liloan, Mandaue, Opon
	Pedro T. Lopez (1906–1957)	December 30, 1953 – March 17, 1957	Nacionalista	3rd Congress	Elected in 1953. Died.	1946–1961; Cebu City, Compostela, Consolacion, Cordova, Liloan, Mandaue, Opon
Vacant (March 17 – December 30, 1957)				3rd Congress	No special election held to fill vacancy.	1946–1961; Cebu City, Compostela, Consolacion, Cordova, Liloan, Mandaue, Opon
	Sergio Osmeña Jr. (1916–1984)	December 30, 1957 – December 30, 1961	Nacionalista	4th Congress	Elected in 1957.	1946–1961; Cebu City, Compostela, Consolacion, Cordova, Liloan, Mandaue, Opon
	Jose Briones	December 30, 1961 – December 30, 1969	Liberal	5th Congress	Elected in 1961.	1961–1973; Cebu City, Compostela, Consolacion, Cordova, Lapu-Lapu, Liloan, Mandaue
	Jose Briones	December 30, 1961 – December 30, 1969	Liberal	6th Congress	Re-elected in 1965.	1961–1973; Cebu City, Compostela, Consolacion, Cordova, Lapu-Lapu, Liloan, Mandaue
	John Henry Osmeña (1935–2021)	December 30, 1969 – December 30, 1971	Liberal	7th Congress	Elected in 1969. Resigned on election as senator.	1961–1973; Cebu City, Compostela, Consolacion, Cordova, Lapu-Lapu, Liloan, Mandaue
Vacant (December 30, 1971 – January 17, 1973)				7th Congress	No special election held to fill vacancy. Seat remained vacant until the ratification of a new Constitution.	1961–1973; Cebu City, Compostela, Consolacion, Cordova, Lapu-Lapu, Liloan, Mandaue
District dissolved into the thirteen-seat Region VII's at-large district for the Interim Batasang Pambansa, followed by the six-seat Cebu's at-large district and the two-seat Cebu City's at-large district for the Regular Batasang Pambansa.

=== 1971 Constitutional Convention (1971–1972) ===
Seat A					Seat B					Seat C					Seat D					Legislature	Constituencies
Portrait	Member (Lifespan)	Term of office	Party	Electoral history	Portrait	Member (Lifespan)	Term of office	Party	Electoral history	Portrait	Member (Lifespan)	Term of office	Party	Electoral history	Portrait	Member (Lifespan)	Term of office	Party	Electoral history	Legislature	Constituencies
	Pedro Yap (1918–2003)	June 1, 1971 – November 29, 1972	Nonpartisan	Elected in 1970.		Marcelo Fernan (1927–1999)	June 1, 1971 – November 29, 1972	Nonpartisan	Elected in 1970.		Natalio Bacalso (1908–1984)	June 1, 1971 – November 29, 1972	Nonpartisan	Elected in 1970.		Jesus P. Garcia	June 1, 1971 – November 29, 1972	Nonpartisan	Elected in 1970.	1971 Constitutional Convention	1971–1972; Cebu City, Compostela, Consolacion, Cordova, Lapu-Lapu, Liloan, Mandaue

=== House of Representatives (1987–present) ===
Portrait	Member (Lifespan)	Term of office	Party	Legislature	Electoral history	Constituencies
District re-created February 2, 1987.
	Crisologo Abines (1943–2008)	June 30, 1987 – June 30, 1998	LnB (until 1988)	8th Congress	Elected in 1987.	1987–2016; Alcantara, Alcoy, Alegria, Argao, Badian, Boljoon, Dalaguete, Dumanjug, Ginatilan, Malabuyoc, Moalboal, Oslob, Ronda, Samboan, Santander
	Crisologo Abines (1943–2008)	June 30, 1987 – June 30, 1998	LDP (from 1988)	8th Congress	Elected in 1987.	1987–2016; Alcantara, Alcoy, Alegria, Argao, Badian, Boljoon, Dalaguete, Dumanjug, Ginatilan, Malabuyoc, Moalboal, Oslob, Ronda, Samboan, Santander
	Crisologo Abines (1943–2008)	June 30, 1987 – June 30, 1998	LDP (from 1988)	9th Congress	Re-elected in 1992.	1987–2016; Alcantara, Alcoy, Alegria, Argao, Badian, Boljoon, Dalaguete, Dumanjug, Ginatilan, Malabuyoc, Moalboal, Oslob, Ronda, Samboan, Santander
	Crisologo Abines (1943–2008)	June 30, 1987 – June 30, 1998	Lakas	10th Congress	Re-elected in 1995.	1987–2016; Alcantara, Alcoy, Alegria, Argao, Badian, Boljoon, Dalaguete, Dumanjug, Ginatilan, Malabuyoc, Moalboal, Oslob, Ronda, Samboan, Santander
	Simeon Kintanar (1936–2026)	June 30, 1998 – June 30, 2007	NPC	11th Congress	Elected in 1998.	1987–2016; Alcantara, Alcoy, Alegria, Argao, Badian, Boljoon, Dalaguete, Dumanjug, Ginatilan, Malabuyoc, Moalboal, Oslob, Ronda, Samboan, Santander
	Simeon Kintanar (1936–2026)	June 30, 1998 – June 30, 2007	NPC	12th Congress	Re-elected in 2001.	1987–2016; Alcantara, Alcoy, Alegria, Argao, Badian, Boljoon, Dalaguete, Dumanjug, Ginatilan, Malabuyoc, Moalboal, Oslob, Ronda, Samboan, Santander
	Simeon Kintanar (1936–2026)	June 30, 1998 – June 30, 2007	NPC	13th Congress	Re-elected in 2004.	1987–2016; Alcantara, Alcoy, Alegria, Argao, Badian, Boljoon, Dalaguete, Dumanjug, Ginatilan, Malabuyoc, Moalboal, Oslob, Ronda, Samboan, Santander
	Pablo P. Garcia (1925–2021)	June 30, 2007 – June 30, 2013	KAMPI (1CEBU) (until 2008)	14th Congress	Elected in 2007.	1987–2016; Alcantara, Alcoy, Alegria, Argao, Badian, Boljoon, Dalaguete, Dumanjug, Ginatilan, Malabuyoc, Moalboal, Oslob, Ronda, Samboan, Santander
	Pablo P. Garcia (1925–2021)	June 30, 2007 – June 30, 2013	Lakas (1CEBU) (from 2008)	14th Congress	Elected in 2007.	1987–2016; Alcantara, Alcoy, Alegria, Argao, Badian, Boljoon, Dalaguete, Dumanjug, Ginatilan, Malabuyoc, Moalboal, Oslob, Ronda, Samboan, Santander
	Pablo P. Garcia (1925–2021)	June 30, 2007 – June 30, 2013	NUP (1CEBU)	15th Congress	Re-elected in 2010.	1987–2016; Alcantara, Alcoy, Alegria, Argao, Badian, Boljoon, Dalaguete, Dumanjug, Ginatilan, Malabuyoc, Moalboal, Oslob, Ronda, Samboan, Santander
	Wilfredo Caminero (born 1954)	June 30, 2013 – June 30, 2022	Liberal	16th Congress	Elected in 2013.	1987–2016; Alcantara, Alcoy, Alegria, Argao, Badian, Boljoon, Dalaguete, Dumanjug, Ginatilan, Malabuyoc, Moalboal, Oslob, Ronda, Samboan, Santander
	Wilfredo Caminero (born 1954)	June 30, 2013 – June 30, 2022	Liberal	17th Congress	Re-elected in 2016.	2016–present Alcoy, Argao, Boljoon, Dalaguete, Oslob, Samboan, Santander
	Wilfredo Caminero (born 1954)	June 30, 2013 – June 30, 2022	NUP	18th Congress	Re-elected in 2019.	2016–present Alcoy, Argao, Boljoon, Dalaguete, Oslob, Samboan, Santander
	Edsel Galeos (born 1959)	June 30, 2022 – present	Lakas (1CEBU)	19th Congress	Elected in 2022.	2016–present Alcoy, Argao, Boljoon, Dalaguete, Oslob, Samboan, Santander
	Edsel Galeos (born 1959)	June 30, 2022 – present	Lakas (1CEBU)	20th Congress	Re-elected in 2025.	2016–present Alcoy, Argao, Boljoon, Dalaguete, Oslob, Samboan, Santander

== Election results ==
=== 2010 ===
2010 Philippine House of Representatives elections in Cebu
Party	Candidate	Votes	%
Lakas–Kampi	Pablo P. Garcia (incumbent)	117,670	65.64
Liberal	Cora Lou Kintanar	61,597	34.36
Valid ballots		179,267	83.90
Invalid or blank votes		34,396	16.10
Total votes		213,663	100.00
Lakas–Kampi hold			

=== 2013 ===
2013 Philippine House of Representatives elections in Cebu
Party	Candidate	Votes	%
Liberal	Wilfredo Caminero	84,256	49.42
NUP	Pablo P. Garcia (incumbent)	77,625	45.53
Independent	Simeon Kintanar	8,607	5.05
Valid ballots		170,488	82.72
Invalid or blank votes		35,619	17.28
Total votes		206,107	100.00
Liberal gain from NUP			

=== 2016 ===
2016 Philippine House of Representatives elections in Cebu
Party	Candidate	Votes	%
Liberal	Wilfredo Caminero (incumbent)	81,167	80.75
1CEBU	Teresita Celis	11,893	11.83
UNA	Cora Lou Kintanar	7,453	7.41
Valid ballots		100,513	80.65
Invalid or blank votes		24,108	19.35
Total votes		124,621	100.00
Liberal hold			

=== 2019 ===
2019 Philippine House of Representatives elections in Cebu
Party	Candidate	Votes	%
NUP	Wilfredo Caminero (incumbent)	66,166	56.45
PDP–Laban	Ronald Allan Cesante	48,918	41.74
UNA	Cora Lou Kintanar	2,125	1.81
Total votes		117,209	100.00
NUP hold			

=== 2022 ===
2022 Philippine House of Representatives elections in Cebu
Party	Candidate	Votes	%
Lakas	Edsel Galeos	73,122	51.73
NUP	Jose Mari Salvador	66,999	47.40
PFP	Leony Gregremosa	1,236	0.87
Total votes		141,357	100.00
Lakas gain from NUP			

=== 2025 ===
2025 Philippine House of Representatives elections in Cebu
Party	Candidate	Votes	%
Lakas	Edsel Galeos (incumbent)	91,984	60.48
Independent	Hilario Davide III	60,111	39.52
Total votes		152,095	100.00
Lakas hold			

== See also ==
- Legislative districts of Cebu

House of Representatives of the Philippines
First	Home district of the speaker of the House of Representatives; October 16, 1907 – February 11, 1922	Succeeded by Capiz's 1st congressional district
