= Alcoy, Cebu =

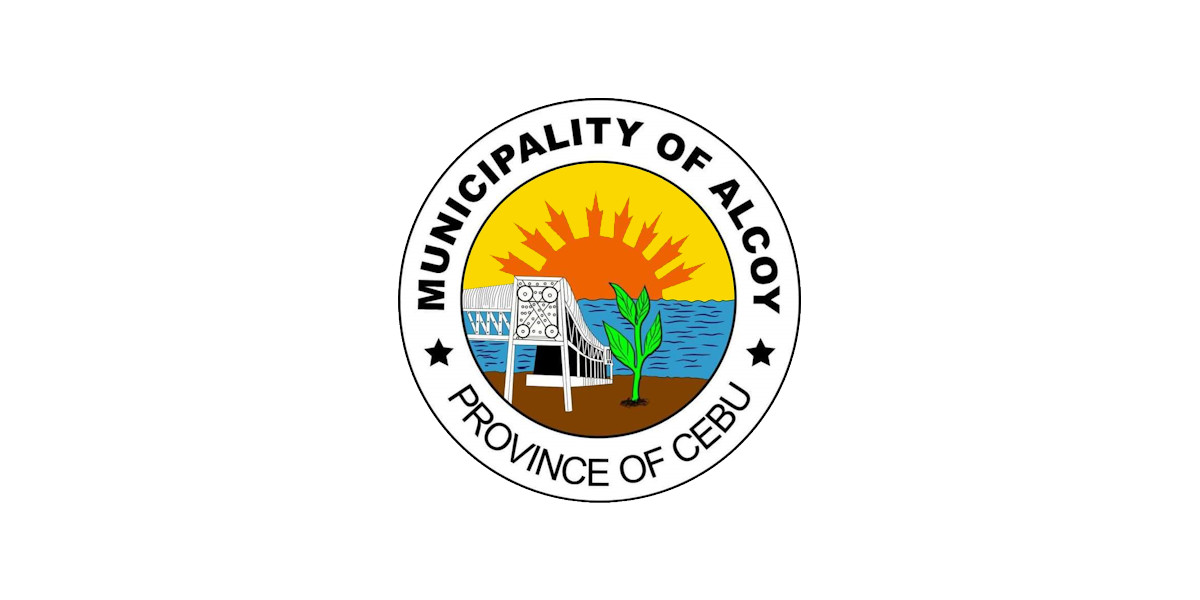
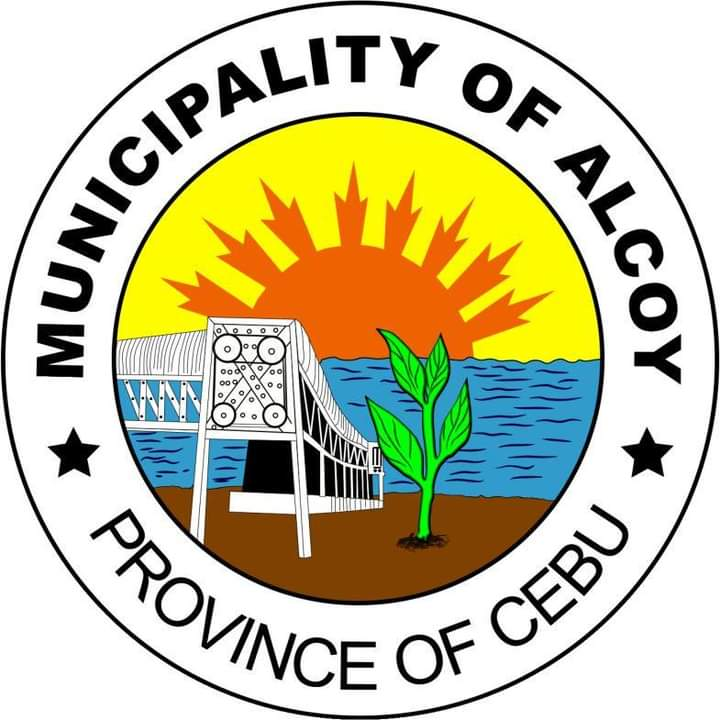
- Flag Seal

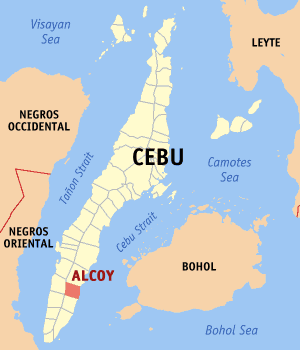
- Map of Cebu with Alcoy highlighted
- Interactive map of Alcoy, Cebu
- Location within the Philippines
- Coordinates: 9°42′29″N 123°30′22″E
- Country: Philippines
- Region: Central Visayas
- Province: Cebu
- District: 2nd district
- Founded: 1880
- Chartered: July 16, 1897
- Named for: Alcoy, Spain
- Barangays: 8 (see Barangays)

Government
  - Type: Sangguniang Bayan
  - Mayor: Jose Eugenio B. Singson, Jr. (1Cebu)
  - Vice Mayor: Michael Angelo D. Sestoso (1Cebu)
  - Representative: Edsel Galeos (Lakas)
  - Municipal Council: Members: Aresteo L. Miñoza, Jr.; Jo Anthony A. Duran; Chris Niño R. De los Santos; Kashieca Gianni C. Romarate; Ascher P. Medel; Neil Tracy Q. Plando; Hank S. Ocampo; Jimmy M. Abajon
  - Electorate: 14,773 voters (2025)

Area
  - Total: 61.63 km^{2} (23.80 sq mi)
- Elevation: 154 m (505 ft)
- Highest elevation: 802 m (2,631 ft)
- Lowest elevation: 0 m (0 ft)

Population (2024 census)
  - Total: 19,207
  - Density: 311.7/km^{2} (807.2/sq mi)
  - Households: 4,257

Economy
  - Income class: 4th municipal income class
  - Poverty incidence: 26.17% (2023)
  - Revenue: ₱ 16.23 million (2024)
  - Assets: ₱ 709.4 million (2024)
  - Expenditure: ₱ 177.9 million (2024)
  - Liabilities: ₱ 121.5 million (2024)

Service provider
  - Electricity: Cebu 1 Electric Cooperative (CEBECO 1)
- Time zone: UTC+8 (PST)
- ZIP code: 6023
- PSGC: 072202000
- IDD : area code: +63 (0)32
- Native languages: Cebuano; Tagalog

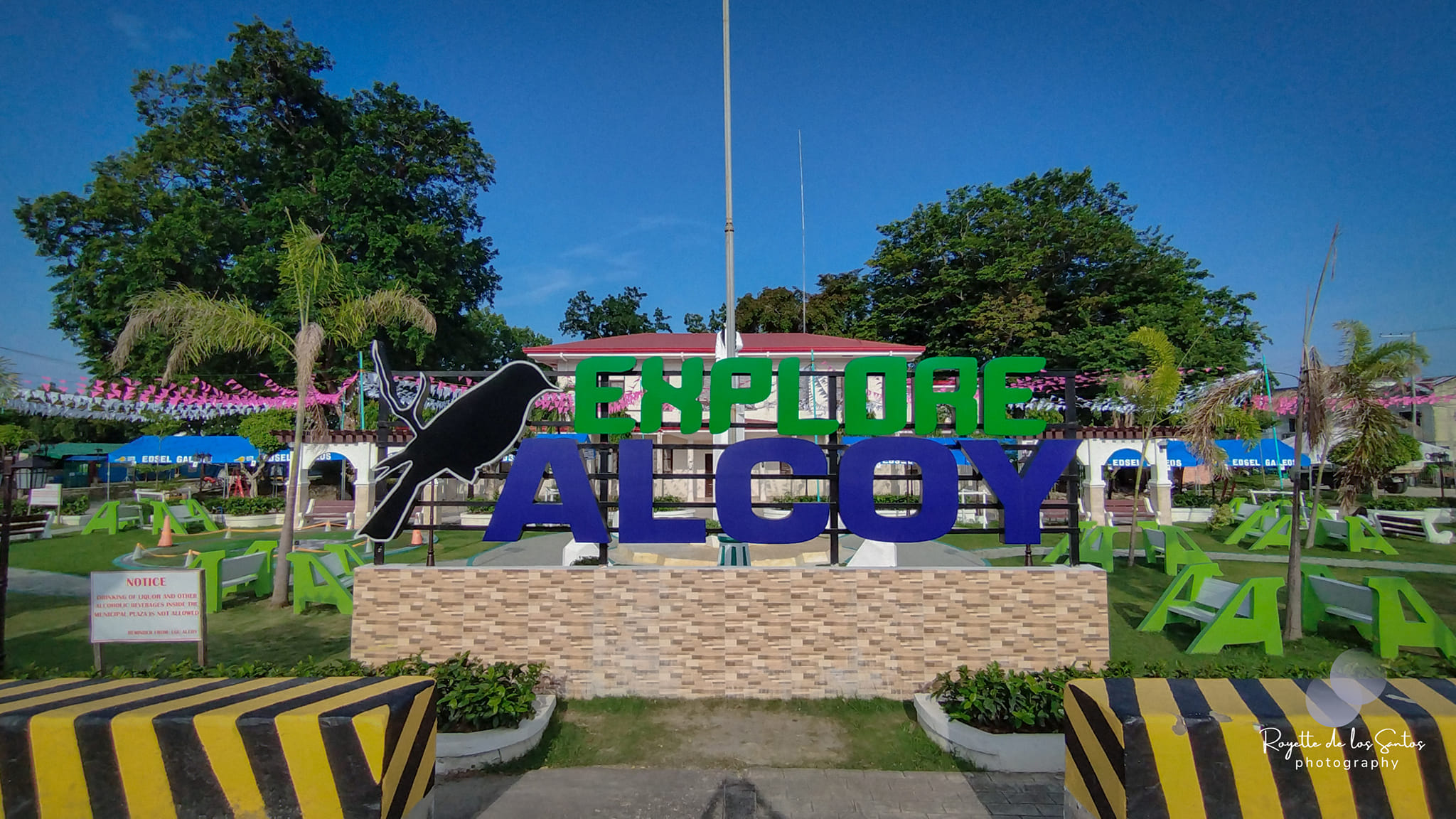

Alcoy, officially the Municipality of Alcoy (Cebuano: Lungsod sa Alcoy; Tagalog: Bayan ng Alcoy), is a municipality in the province of Cebu, Philippines. According to the 2024 census, it has a population of 19,207 people.

It is named after Alcoy in Spain.

== History ==
=== Spanish colonization ===
The old town of Alcoy, located in the current barangay of Daanlungsod, known as Mambaje, becomes one of the visitas of Carcar in 1690. Mambaje is absorbed as a barrio of Boljoon in 1692. The church in Alcoy and three Bantayan sa Hari or watchtowers are built. The settlers choose Sta. Rosa de Lima as their patron saint.

A creation of the town of Mambaje was proposed. On July 16, 1866, Mambaje becomes a municipality. A year after, the first formal school opened in Alcoy, according to the Spanish Organic Law of 1863. In 1869, Mambaje was renamed to Alcoy. The seat of local government or the poblacion was moved from Mambaje to Hulomaynon (now Poblacion). In 1890, the town of Alcoy ranks first in production of coffee and sixth in cotton in the province of Cebu. Then in 1898, Alcoy joins the Anti-Spanish Uprising.

=== American and Japanese period ===
In 1899, Alcoy, and the rest of the Philippines, is occupied by the Americans. Resistance against the new colonizers in Cebu ceased in 1901. The town experienced a smallpox and cholera epidemic in 1903. Between 1904 and 1916, Alcoy is merged to the town of Dalaguete. Herminigildo Mosqueda becomes Alcoy's first elected mayor after he wins the local elections in 1928.

During World War II, Hilario de los Santos organizes and heads the local guerilla resistance against the Japanese in Alcoy. The Civil Affairs unit is formed at Nug-as with former Mayor Herminigildo Mosqueda as president.

=== Post-independence ===
The Philippines became independent from the United States on July 4, 1946. On November 11, 1947, Pedro Romanos is the first elected mayor of Alcoy in the post-war era. In 1971, Catalino de los Santos is elected mayor and remained in office during the Martial Law period until the EDSA Revolution in 1986. The Dolomite Mining Corporation is established in 1980.

=== Contemporary ===
Eusebio Sestoso becomes the elected mayor of Alcoy after the EDSA Revolution in 1988. During the administration of Antonio Plando, the Siloy Festival is launched in 2005. Michael Angelo Sestoso wins the mayoralty election in 2016.

== Geography ==
Alcoy is 92 kilometers (57 mi) from Cebu City.

It is bordered to the north by the town of Dalaguete, to the west is the town of Alegria, to the east is the Cebu Strait, and to the south is the town of Boljoon.

=== Barangays ===
Alcoy is politically subdivided into 8 barangays. Each barangay consists of puroks and some have sitios.

PSGC	Barangay	Population			±% p.a.	
		2024		2010		
072202001	Atabay	12.1%	2,323	1,535	▴	2.92%
072202002	Daan-Lungsod	12.5%	2,392	1,569	▴	2.98%
072202003	Guiwang	9.5%	1,827	1,490	▴	1.43%
072202004	Nug‑as	18.9%	3,631	2,923	▴	1.52%
072202005	Pasol	9.8%	1,884	1,740	▴	0.55%
072202006	Poblacion	20.5%	3,943	2,991	▴	1.94%
072202007	Pugalo	13.9%	2,669	2,043	▴	1.88%
072202008	San Agustin	2.7%	517	466	▴	0.72%
	Total		19,207	14,757	▴	1.85%

==== Daan-Lungsod and Guiwang ====
Daan-Lungsod, formerly known as Mambaje, is the southernmost barangay of Alcoy. Tingko Beach is located partly in this small barangay and partly in Guiwang. A fiesta is held in Daan-Lungsod every 3 May in honor of Santa Cruz. There is a reef called Mabad-on which appears during low tide, and is completely submerged during high tide. Mabad-on is listed as Mambahi Reef in the Philippine maritime and navigation map.

The elementary school is located in Guiwang. Guiwang celebrates 13 June the feast day of Saint Anthony of Padua.

Two baluwarti (watchtowers) still stand in the two barangays. The watchtowers are the oldest-surviving structures in Alcoy and they are reminders of the Spanish occupation of Cebu Island. They were used to warn the locals that pirates were coming. Originally a settlement of Dalaguete, it was founded by the Spaniards in 1880 and was developed into a stop-over station for priests going to Dalaguete. In 1869, via a royal decree, Mambaje became a municipality and was renamed to Alcoy, after a city in Spain.

==== Poblacion ====
The Poblacion is the principal barangay of Alcoy. It is where the main facilities of the town are located: the municipal government center, police station, and main health center.

==== Pugalo ====
The country's largest dolomite quarry is mined in Pugalo.

=== Climate ===
Climate data for Alcoy, Cebu
Month	Jan	Feb	Mar	Apr	May	Jun	Jul	Aug	Sep	Oct	Nov	Dec	Year
Mean daily maximum °C (°F)	29 (84)	29 (84)	30 (86)	32 (90)	31 (88)	30 (86)	30 (86)	30 (86)	30 (86)	29 (84)	29 (84)	29 (84)	30 (86)
Mean daily minimum °C (°F)	23 (73)	23 (73)	23 (73)	24 (75)	25 (77)	25 (77)	24 (75)	24 (75)	24 (75)	24 (75)	24 (75)	23 (73)	24 (75)
Average precipitation mm (inches)	35 (1.4)	28 (1.1)	38 (1.5)	51 (2.0)	125 (4.9)	195 (7.7)	194 (7.6)	173 (6.8)	180 (7.1)	192 (7.6)	121 (4.8)	64 (2.5)	1,396 (55)
Average rainy days	9.2	8.2	9.9	11.3	22.5	27.3	28.0	27.2	27.1	26.9	19.7	12.7	230
Source: Meteoblue (Use with caution: this is modeled/calculated data, not measured locally.)

=== Tourist attractions ===
Alcoy's Nug-as forest is the last rainforest of Cebu. It borders the town of Argao and is connected to the town's Lantoy Mountain. It is the home of the Black Shama (Copsychus Cebuensis), a local species of song bird in the family Muscicapidae that is only found in Cebu, where it is known locally as "Siloy".

The Siloy Festival is Alcoy's nature festival and eco-tourism project. It is in honor of St. Rose of Lima. The festival takes its name from the local term of the Black Shama. The festival is a project meant to promote awareness of the Black Shama and its endangered nature and to help preserve Cebu's endemic Shama species of birds, as well to help save Mother Earth. It is celebrated on 23 August every year.

Nug-as Sea of Clouds is also found in mountain barangay of Nug-as, Alcoy which also serve as a tourist attraction in the municipality.

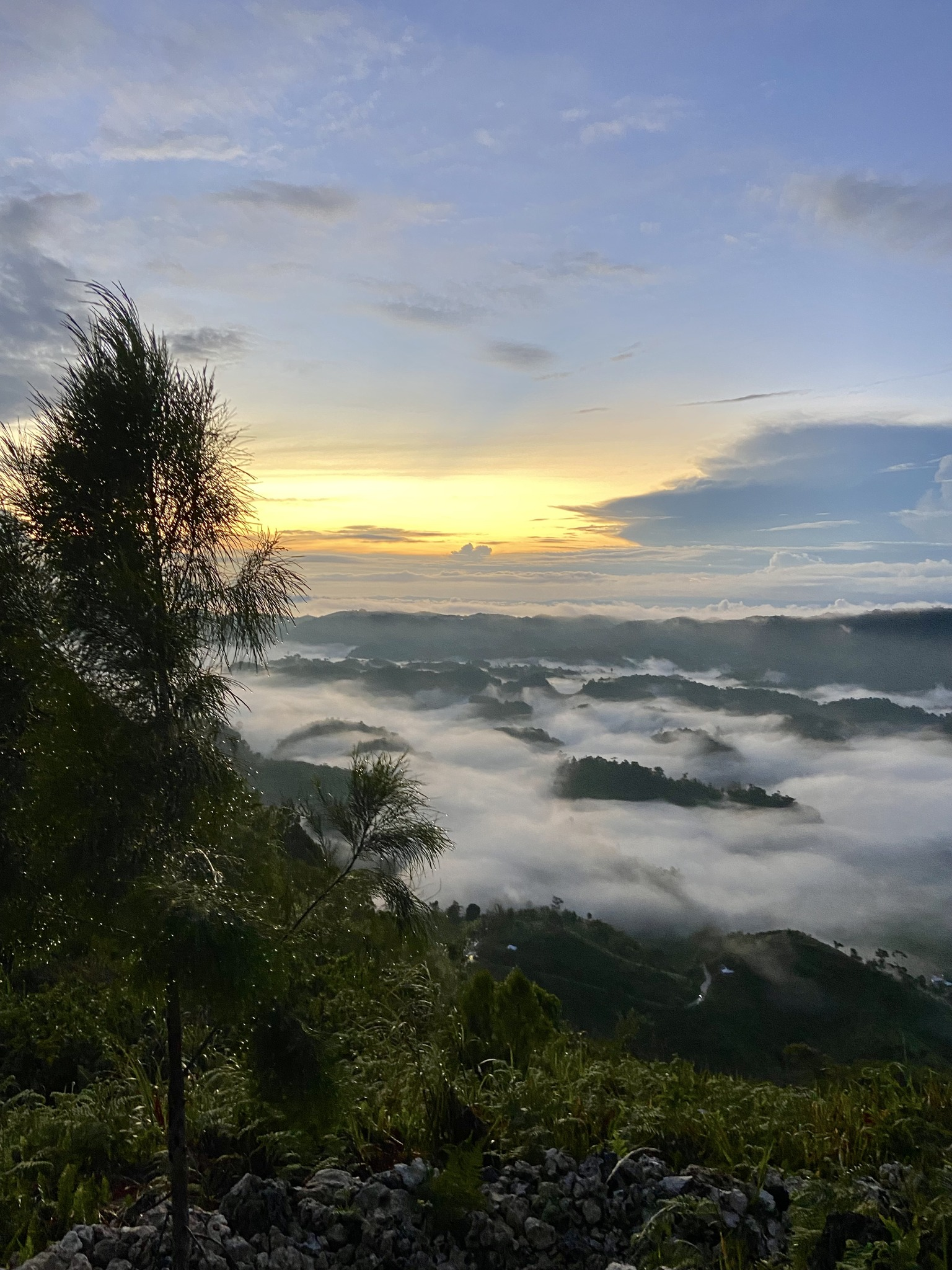

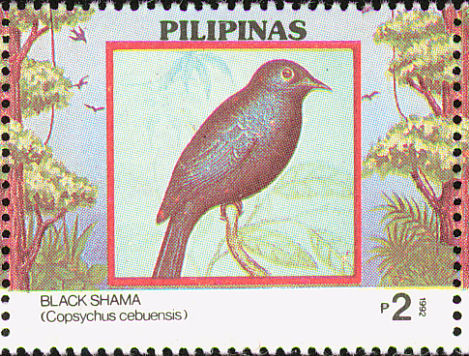
The 1992 Stamp of the Philippines showing the Black Shama Bird, known locally as "Siloy".

== Demographics ==
Population census of Alcoy
Year	Pop.	±% p.a.
1903	6,474	—
1918	6,575	+0.10%
1939	6,443	−0.10%
1948	6,708	+0.45%
1960	7,364	+0.78%
1970	6,965	−0.55%
1975	8,692	+4.54%
1980	8,129	−1.33%
1990	10,485	+2.58%
1995	11,539	+1.81%
2000	13,497	+3.42%
2007	14,571	+1.06%
2010	14,757	+0.46%
2015	16,979	+2.71%
2020	19,186	+2.61%
2024	19,207	+0.03%
Source: Philippine Statistics Authority

== Economy ==
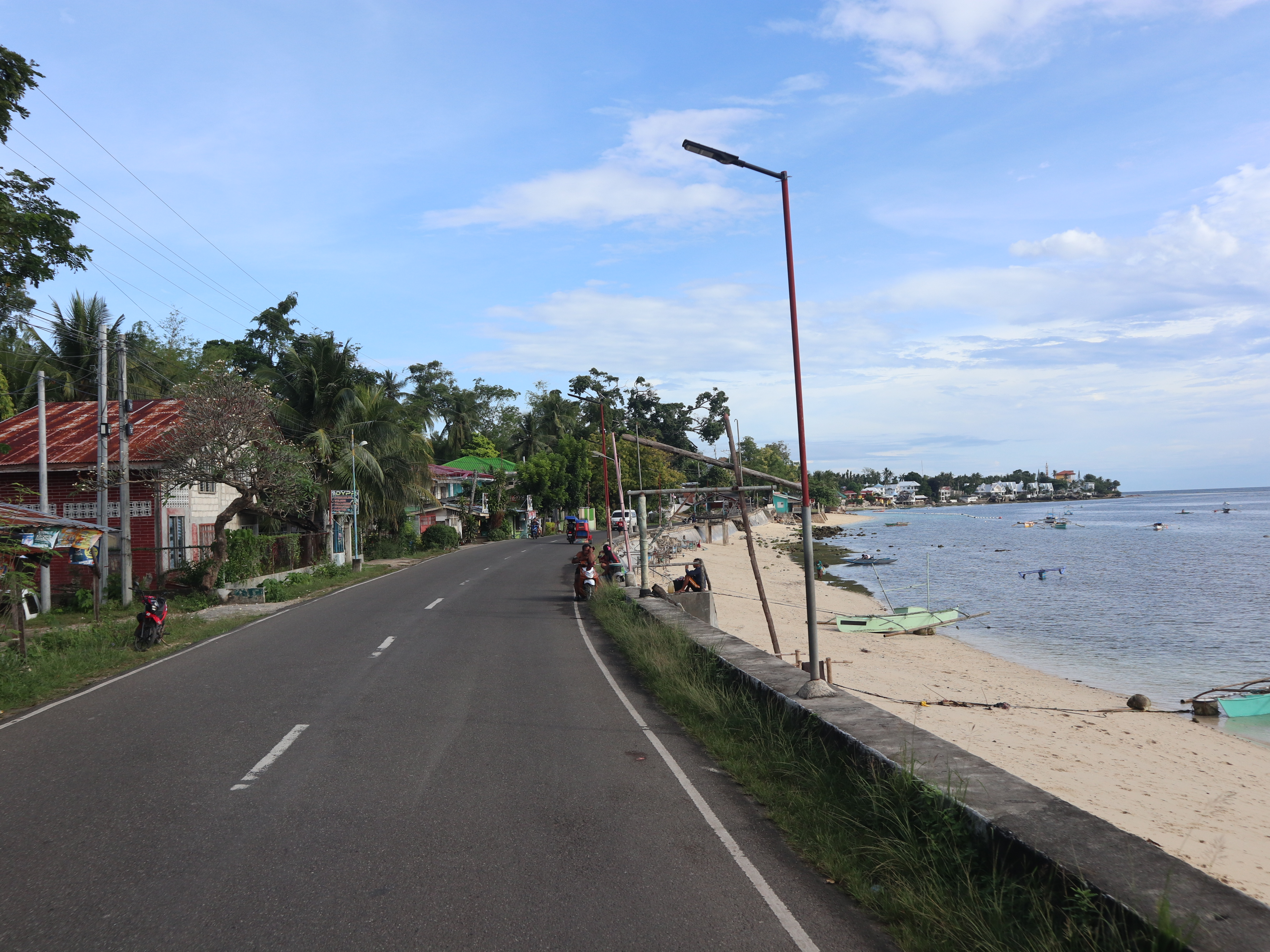
Natalio Bacalso Avenue, the main thoroughfare through Alcoy, near Tingko Beach

Poverty incidence of Alcoy (%)

Source: Philippine Statistics Authority

Alcoy is mainly an agricultural town with Nug‑as, a mountain barangay, more than half of commercial crops. The rest of the communities rely on subsistence fishing and backyard farming. The country's largest dolomite quarry is mined in Pugalo. Beaches are located in Guiwang and Daanlungsod.

== Education ==
The public schools in the town of Alcoy are administered by one school district under the Schools Division of Cebu Province.

Elementary schools:

- Alcoy Central Elementary School — N. Bacalso Avenue, Poblacion
- Bulalacao Elementary School — Sitio Bulalacao, Nug-as
- Caidiocan Primary School — Sitio Caidiocan, Poblacion
- Guiwang Elementary School — Guiwang
- Lalin Elementary School — Sitio Lalin, Atabay
- Nug-as Elementary School — Nug-as
- San Agustin Elementary School — San Agustin

High schools:

- Alcoy National High School — Poblacion
- Nug-as National High School — Nug-as

Integrated schools:

- Pasol-Pugalo Integrated School — Pugalo
