= Edsel Galeos =

Filipino politician (born 1959)

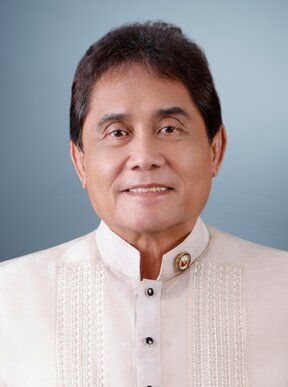
- Official portrait, 2025

Member of the Philippine House of Representatives from Cebu's 2nd district
- Incumbent
- Assumed office June 30, 2022
- Preceded by: Wilfredo Caminero

Member of the Cebu Provincial Board from the 2nd district
- In office June 30, 2016 – June 30, 2022

Mayor of Argao, Cebu
- In office June 30, 2007 – June 30, 2016

Personal details
- Born: Edsel Amatong Galeos; March 12, 1959 (age 67) Cebu City, Cebu, Philippines
- Party: Lakas (2008–2012; 2024–present); 1CEBU (2018–present)
- Other political affiliations: PDP–Laban (2018–2024); Independent (2015–2018); Liberal (2012–2015); KAMPI (2007–2008)
- Children: 3

Edsel Amatong Galeos (born March 12, 1959) is a Filipino politician who is the current congressman for Cebu's 2nd congressional district since 2022.

== Early life ==
Galeos was born in Argao, Cebu, where he graduated with a bachelor's degree in civil engineering at the Cebu Institute of Technology – University in 1979.

== Career ==
Galeos worked in the Bureau of Forest Development, Cebu. He was then elected mayor of Argao and later board member for Cebu's 2nd District as an independent. He was re-elected board member of PDP–Laban. He was elected congressman under PDP–Laban after winning the election against Tata Salvador.

He sponsored 89 bills with the Philippine House of Representatives.

== Personal life ==
He is married to Grace Flores Sarmago, with whom he has three children.

He runs a construction company, the EG and I Construction Corporation.
