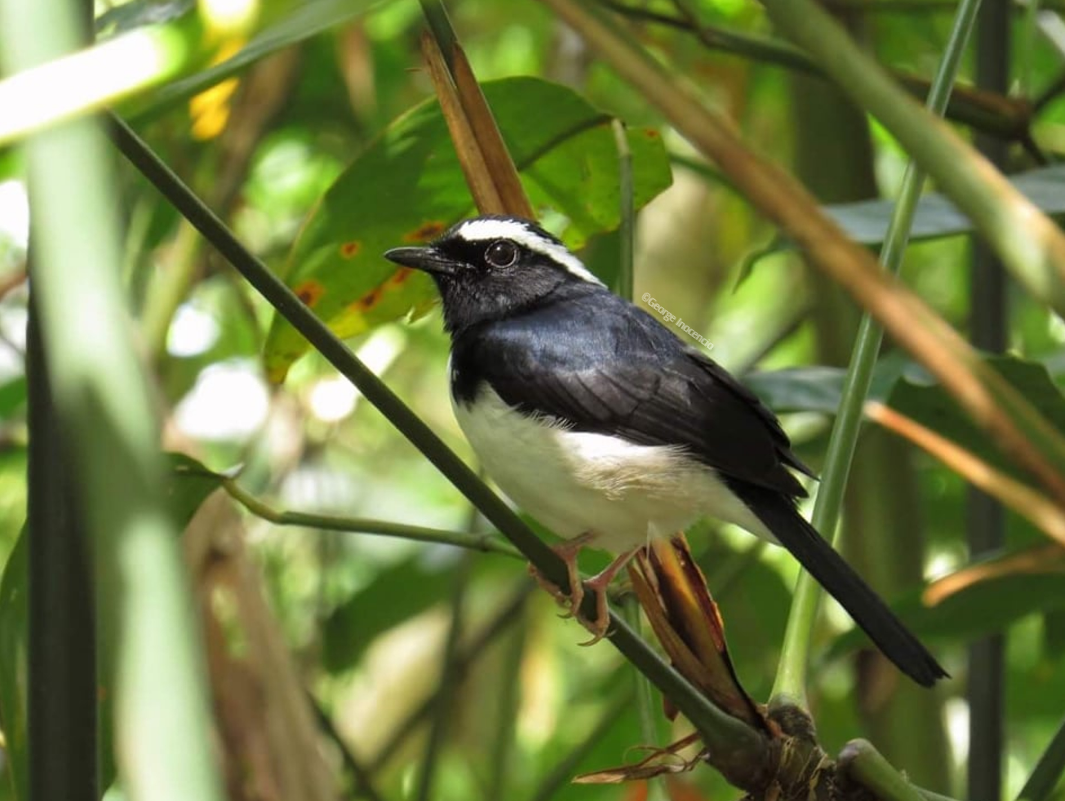
- Male
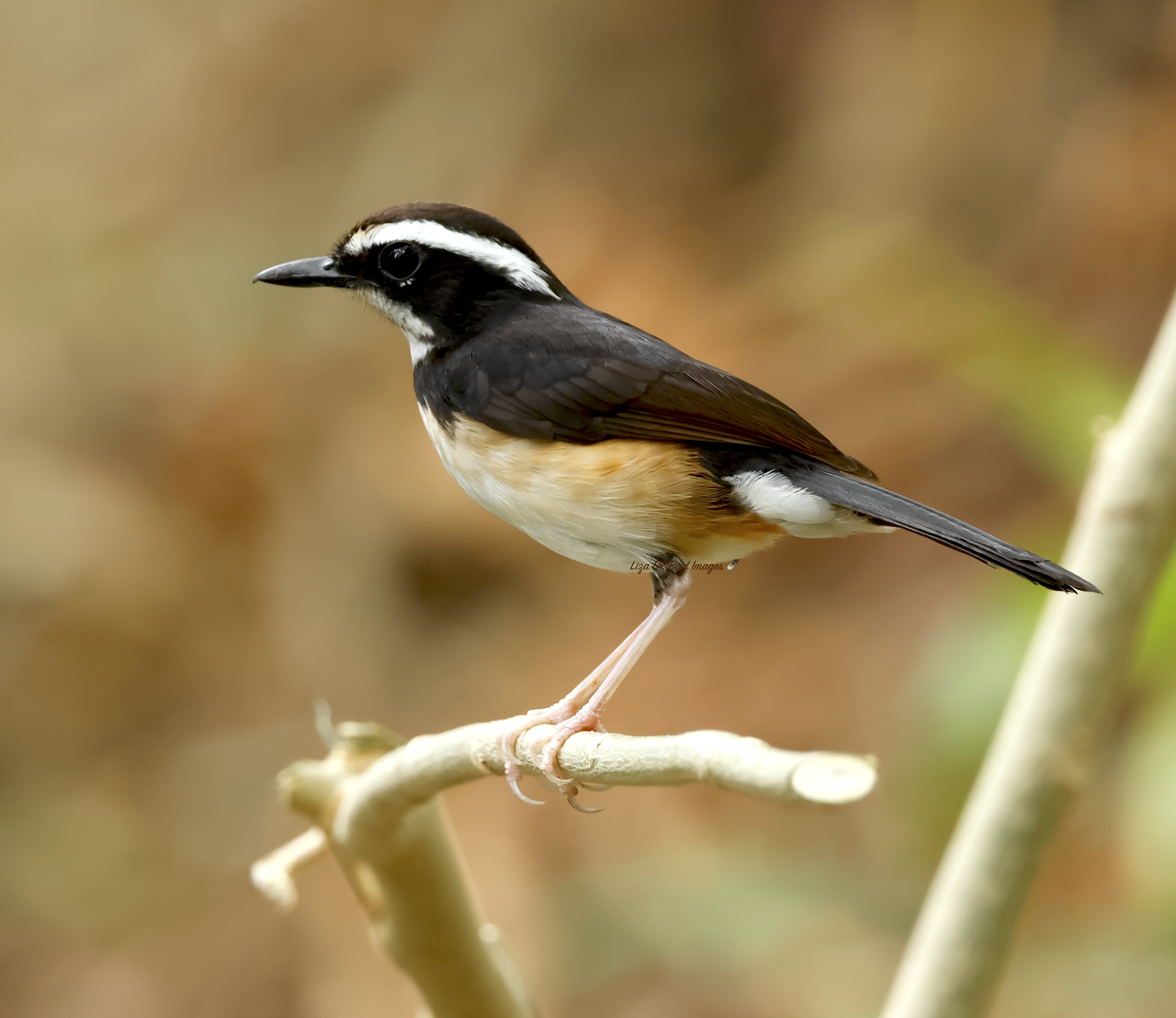
- Female

Conservation status
- Least Concern (IUCN 3.1)

Scientific classification
- Kingdom: Animalia
- Phylum: Chordata
- Class: Aves
- Order: Passeriformes
- Family: Muscicapidae
- Genus: Copsychus
- Species: C. superciliaris

Binomial name
- Copsychus superciliaris (Bourns & Worcester, 1894)
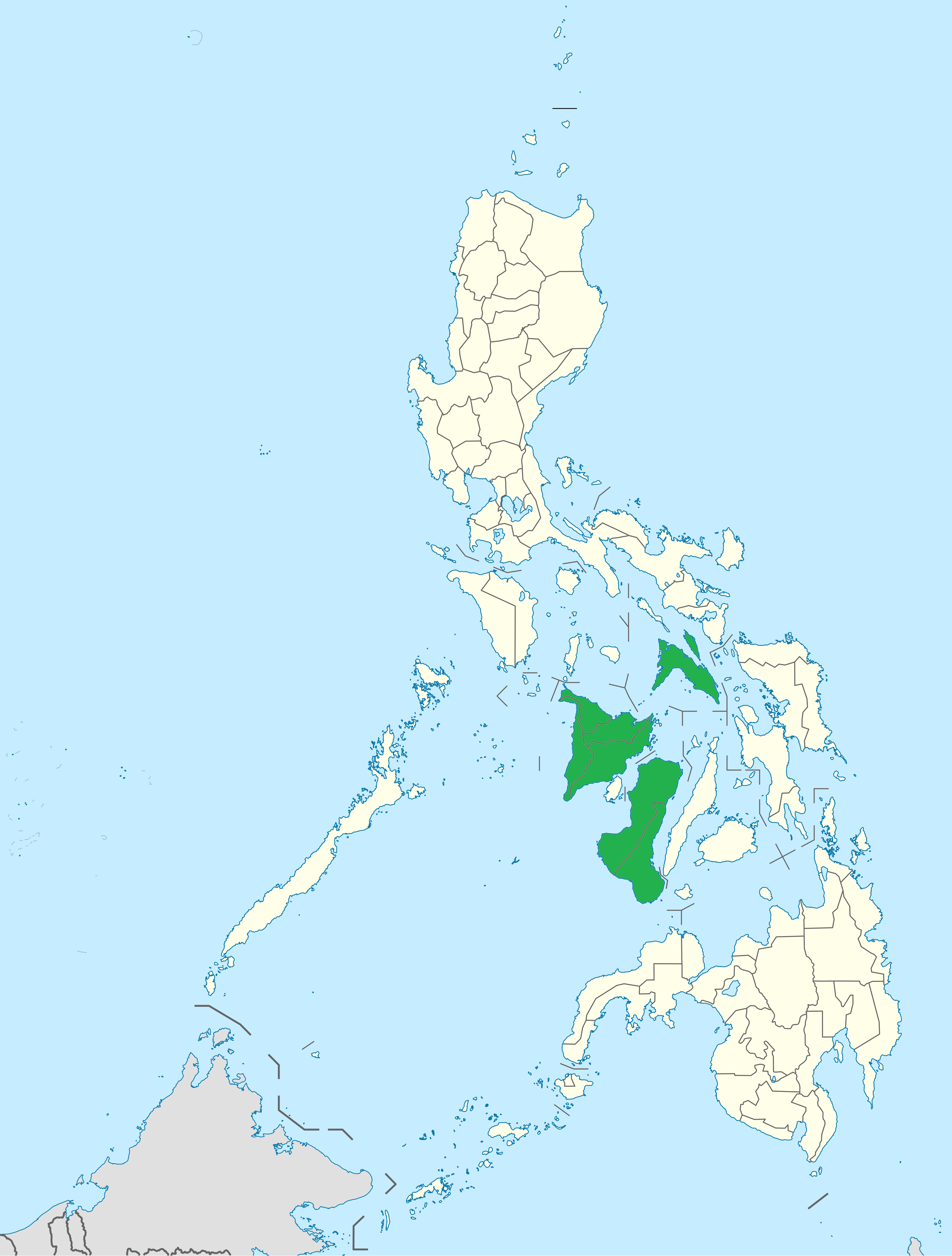

= Visayan shama =

Species of bird

The Visayan shama (Copsychus superciliaris) is a species of bird in the family Muscicapidae. It is endemic to Ticao, Masbate, Negros, and Panay in the Philippines. It formerly considered a subspecies of the white-browed shama (Copsychus luzoniensis).

== Description and taxonomy ==
Described on ebird as "A medium-sized, long-tailed bird... Black on the upperparts and tail, with a white belly and pale pink legs. Male has a black throat and chest. Female has a rufous patch on the rump and lower back, and a white throat with a black breast band. Somewhat similar to Philippine magpie-robin, but has a long white eyebrow and no white wing patch. Heard more often than seen. Gives a very varied song, with loud melodic whistles, warbling trills, and repeated loud “chew chew chew!” notes."

It was previously conspecific with the White-browed shama but it differs in molecular genetics, vocally, an all black rump, wings and tail, lacking the White-browed's white wingpatch, shorter tail and longer legs.

== Ecology and behavior ==
Not much is known about the diet but also presumed to feed on a typical shama diet of insects. Usually seen in pairs foraging close to the forest floor or thickets with a lot of tangled vines.

Nothing is known about its breeding habits.

== Habitat and conservation ==
Its natural habitat is moist tropical primary and secondary forest up to 1,000 meters above sea level.

International Union for Conservation of Nature has assessed this bird as least-concern species but with a declining population.

This species' main threat is habitat loss with wholesale clearance of forest habitats as a result of logging, agricultural conversion and mining activities occurring within the range. Negros Island is one of the most deforested areas in the country due to its sugar industry and logging with most of its forests being totally lost before the 21st century. Forest cover on Negros and Panay is just 3% and 6% respectively and these figures are still declining.

It occurs in a few protected areas within Mt. Kanlaon Natural Park and Northern Negros Natural Park; however, protection and enforcement against deforestation is lax. It also occurs in the proposed Central Panay Mountain Range Park which contains the largest block of remaining forest in the Western Visayas, and the tourist destination of Twin Lakes (Mount Talinis). Both sites benefit from conservation funding but are still under threat by deforestation.
