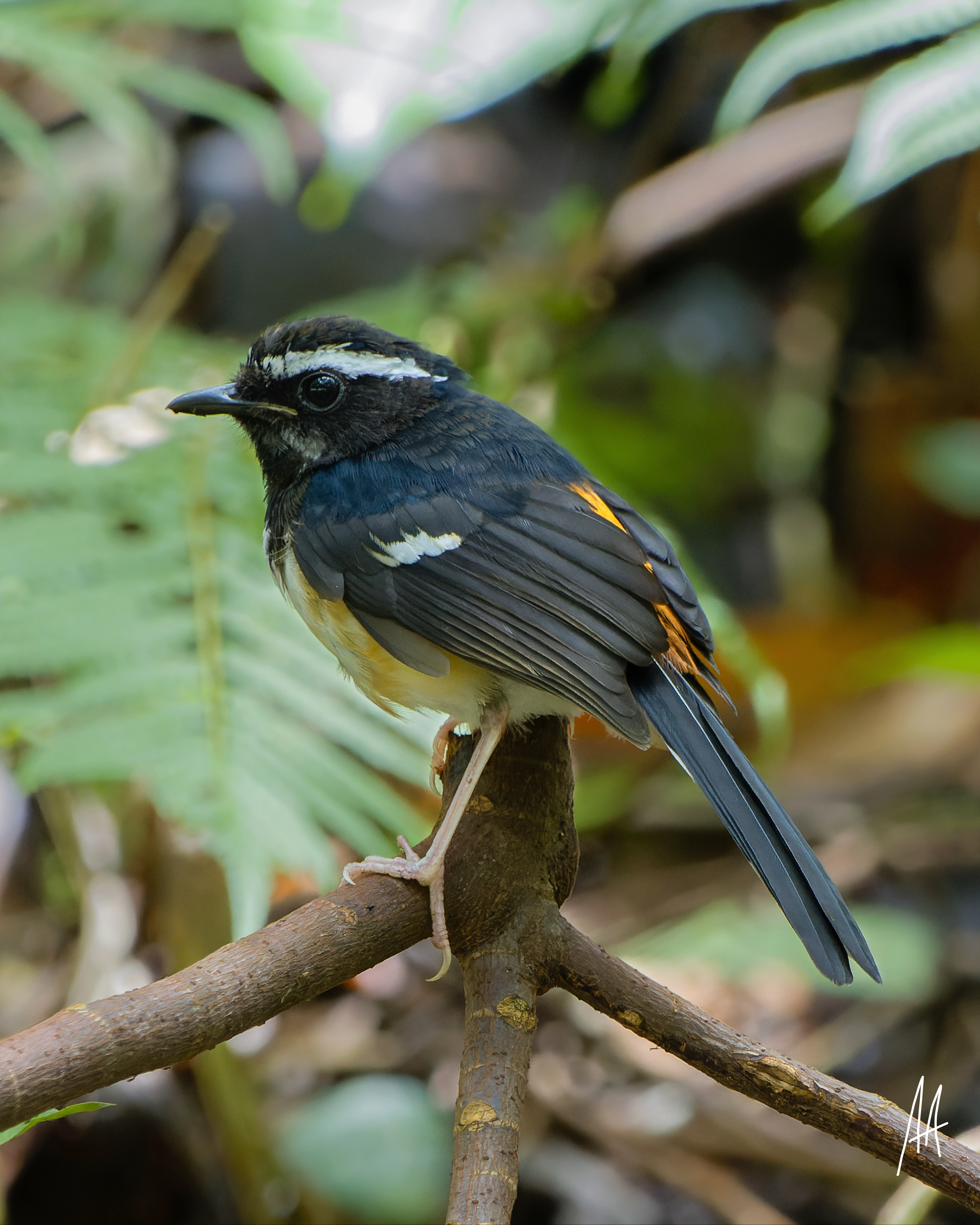

Conservation status
- Least Concern (IUCN 3.1)

Scientific classification
- Kingdom: Animalia
- Phylum: Chordata
- Class: Aves
- Order: Passeriformes
- Family: Muscicapidae
- Genus: Copsychus
- Species: C. luzoniensis

Binomial name
- Copsychus luzoniensis (Kittlitz, 1832)
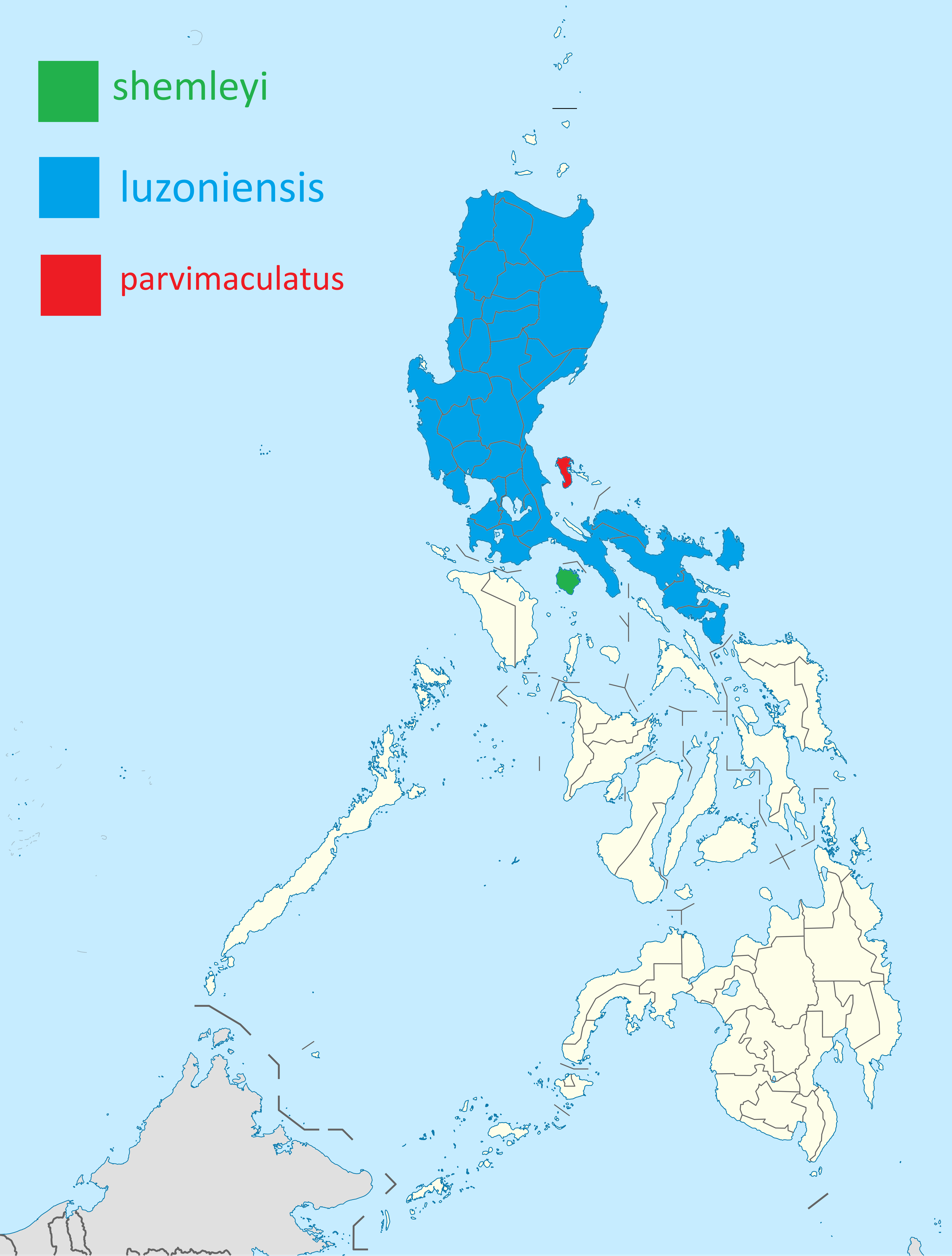

= White-browed shama =

Species of bird

The white-browed shama (Copsychus luzoniensis) is a species of bird in the family Muscicapidae. It is endemic to the Philippines found only on the islands of Luzon, Marinduque and the Polillo Islands. The Visayan shama (C. superciliaris), formerly considered a subspecies, was split as a distinct species in 2021.

== Description and taxonomy ==
They exhibit sexual dimorphism in which females are paler with a gray chest and face with brown head, back and wings.

=== Subspecies ===
Three subspecies are recognized:

- C. l. luzoniensis (Kittlitz, FH, 1832) – northern Philippines (Luzon and Catanduanes)
- C. l. parvimaculatus (McGregor, RC, 1910) – Polillo (Philippines)
- C. l. shemleyi du Pont, JE, 1976 – Marinduque (Philippines)

These subspecies are poorly differentiated and likely will be lumped in the future.

== Ecology and behavior ==
Presumed to feed on small insects and larvae. Typically found in pairs foraging in the dense and lower foliage. This species is believed to be territorial.

Breeding occurs in April and may. Nest is described as cub of grass and dry leaves. Lays 2 pale green eggs with reddish brown spots.

== Habitat and conservation status ==
Found in primary forest, mature secondary forest typically in below 1,000 m (3,280 ft) asl. It is believed to be generally common.

This species has been assessed as Least-concern species by the International Union for Conservation of Nature as it remains locally common and relatively tolerant to disturbed habitats. This species is still believed to be on the decline due to the extensive habitat clearance. This species' main threat is habitat loss with wholesale clearance of forest habitats as a result of logging, agricultural conversion and mining activities occurring within the range. This species is found in a few protected areas including Bataan National Park, Northern Sierra Madre Natural Park, Angat Watershed Forest Reserve, Mount Makiling, Kalbario–Patapat Natural Park, Bicol Natural Park and Bulusan Volcano Natural Park but actual protection from deforestation is still lax.
