= Argao =

Municipality in Cebu, Philippines

- Municipality
- Municipality of Argao
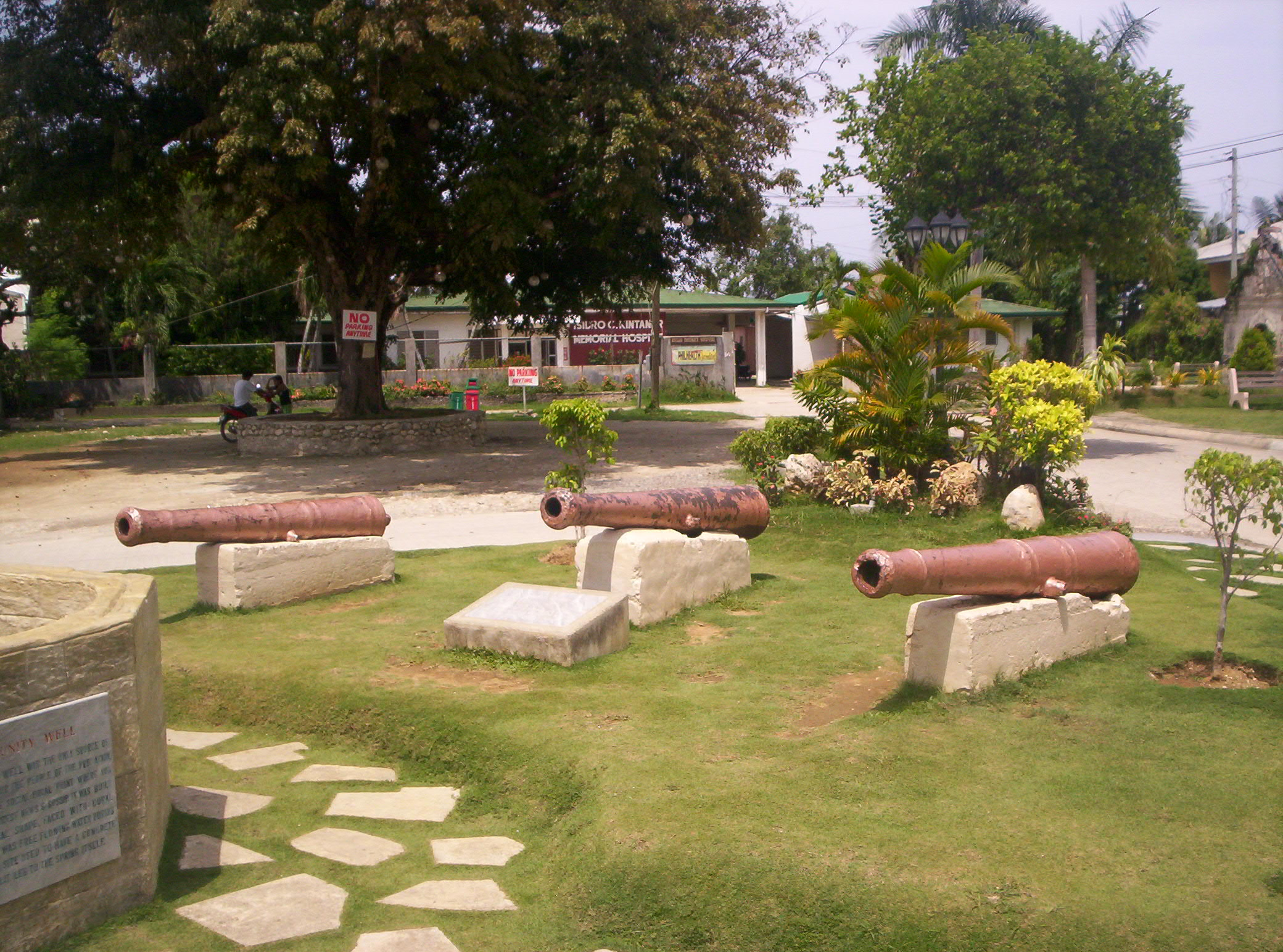
- Old cannons of Argao

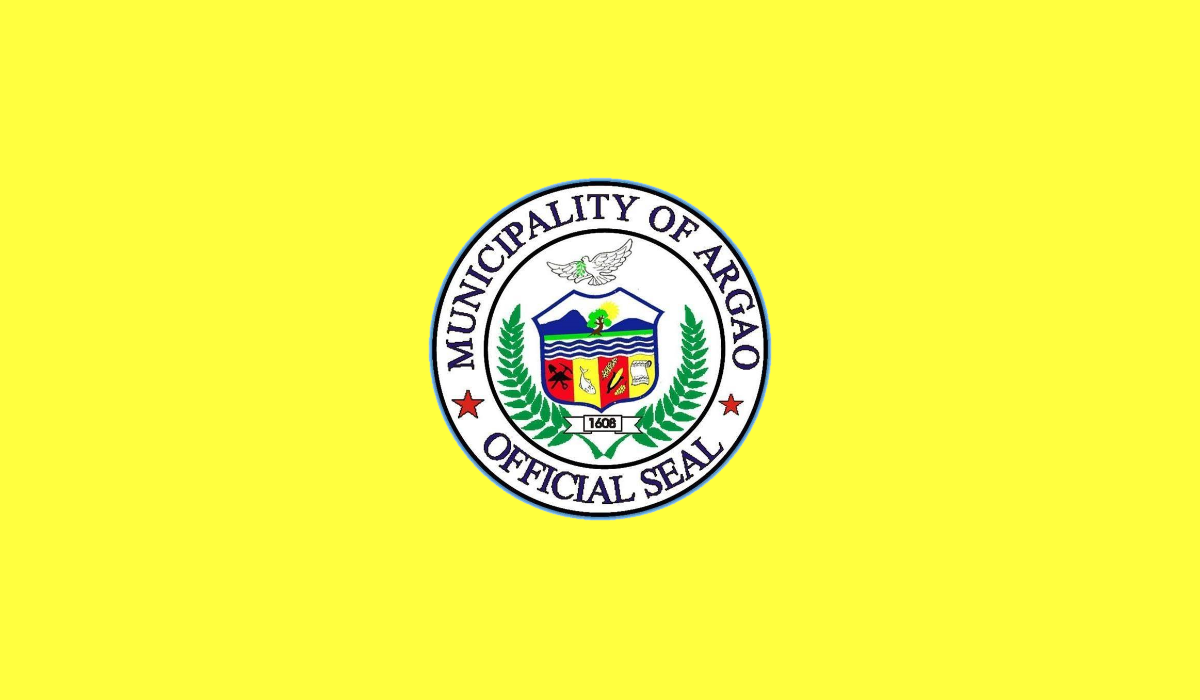
- Flag

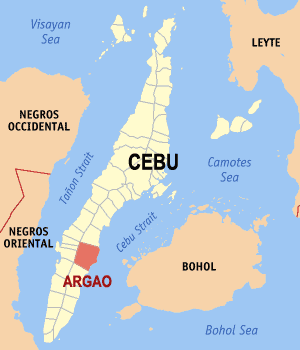
- Map of Cebu with Argao highlighted
- Interactive map of Argao
- Location within the Philippines
- Coordinates: 9°53′N 123°36′E
- Country: Philippines
- Region: Central Visayas
- Province: Cebu
- District: 2nd district
- Founded: 1608
- Barangays: 45 (see Barangays)

Government
  - Type: Sangguniang Bayan
  - Mayor: Allan M. Sesaldo (1Cebu)
  - Vice Mayor: Orvi G. Ortega (IND)
  - Representative: Edsel Galeos (Lakas)
  - Municipal Council: Members: Herculene Raymund H. Rizon; Reno Rhine A. Mamac; Jessa Mae S. Flores-Mier; Annabelle C. Almirante-Birondo; Fedlemido R. Albero; Guillermo S. Caminero, Jr.; Gus Anthony L. Bacalso; Vip F. Semilla
  - Electorate: 56,384 voters (2025)

Area
  - Total: 191.50 km^{2} (73.94 sq mi)
- Elevation: 43 m (141 ft)
- Highest elevation: 442 m (1,450 ft)
- Lowest elevation: 0 m (0 ft)

Population (2024 census)
  - Total: 78,111
  - Density: 407.89/km^{2} (1,056.4/sq mi)
  - Households: 19,017

Economy
  - Income class: 1st municipal income class
  - Poverty incidence: 19.9% (2023)
  - Revenue: ₱ 38.94 million (2024)
  - Assets: ₱ 999.7 million (2024)
  - Expenditure: ₱ 261.1 million (2024)
  - Liabilities: ₱ 464.1 million (2024)

Service provider
  - Electricity: Cebu 1 Electric Cooperative (CEBECO 1)
- Time zone: UTC+8 (PST)
- ZIP code: 6021
- PSGC: 072205000
- IDD : area code: +63 (0)32
- Native languages: Cebuano; Tagalog
- Patron saint: Michael

Argao, officially the Municipality of Argao (Cebuano: Lungsod sa Argao; Tagalog: Bayan ng Argao), is a municipality in the province of Cebu, Philippines. According to the 2024 census, it has a population of 78,111 people.

== Geography ==
The municipality of Argao is located in the southeast of the province of Cebu, 67 kilometres (42 mi) from Cebu City.

Argao is bordered to the north by the municipality of Sibonga, to the west are the municipalities of Ronda, Alcantara and Moalboal, to the east is the Cebu Strait, and to the south is the municipality of Dalaguete.

=== Barangays ===
Argao is politically subdivided into 45 barangays. Each barangay consists of puroks and some have sitios.

PSGC	Barangay	Population			±% p.a.	
		2024		2010		
072205001	Alambijud	2.0%	1,587	1,514	▴	0.33%
072205002	Anajao	1.1%	831	907	▾	−0.60%
072205003	Apo	0.7%	525	664	▾	−1.61%
072205004	Balaas	1.2%	906	985	▾	−0.57%
072205005	Balisong	2.6%	2,035	1,944	▴	0.32%
072205006	Binlod	5.5%	4,280	3,343	▴	1.72%
072205007	Bogo	5.2%	4,090	3,505	▴	1.07%
072205009	Bug‑ot	1.1%	829	837	▾	−0.07%
072205010	Bulasa	5.4%	4,202	3,523	▴	1.22%
072205008	Butong	1.0%	772	924	▾	−1.23%
072205012	Calagasan	1.5%	1,180	875	▴	2.08%
072205013	Canbantug	1.1%	870	843	▴	0.22%
072205014	Canbanua	2.1%	1,676	2,179	▾	−1.79%
072205015	Cansuje	3.7%	2,854	2,206	▴	1.79%
072205016	Capio‑an	0.9%	688	1,192	▾	−3.72%
072205017	Casay	1.9%	1,463	788	▴	4.36%
072205018	Catang	0.8%	637	651	▾	−0.15%
072205019	Colawin	1.7%	1,333	943	▴	2.42%
072205020	Conalum	0.7%	513	615	▾	−1.24%
072205021	Guiwanon	2.3%	1,787	1,726	▴	0.24%
072205022	Gutlang	1.1%	832	770	▴	0.54%
072205023	Jampang	3.5%	2,710	2,217	▴	1.39%
072205024	Jomgao	1.2%	925	1,102	▾	−1.20%
072205025	Lamacan	3.0%	2,347	2,256	▴	0.27%
072205026	Langtad	4.5%	3,504	2,887	▴	1.34%
072205027	Langub	0.9%	697	804	▾	−0.98%
072205028	Lapay	1.0%	748	677	▴	0.69%
072205029	Lengigon	1.4%	1,101	989	▴	0.74%
072205030	Linut‑od	1.2%	919	1,024	▾	−0.74%
072205031	Mabasa	1.9%	1,467	1,281	▴	0.94%
072205032	Mandilikit	1.6%	1,278	645	▴	4.83%
072205033	Mompeller	1.3%	985	753	▴	1.87%
072205034	Panadtaran	0.9%	740	524	▴	2.41%
072205035	Poblacion	9.2%	7,196	5,570	▴	1.78%
072205036	Sua	0.9%	736	755	▾	−0.18%
072205037	Sumaguan	1.4%	1,080	883	▴	1.40%
072205038	Tabayag	1.0%	818	999	▾	−1.37%
072205039	Talaga	5.1%	3,991	3,485	▴	0.94%
072205040	Talaytay	2.3%	1,766	1,438	▴	1.43%
072205041	Talo‑ot	5.2%	4,033	3,683	▴	0.63%
072205042	Tiguib	1.3%	1,014	1,202	▾	−1.17%
072205043	Tulang	0.8%	600	869	▾	−2.52%
072205044	Tulic	4.3%	3,369	2,494	▴	2.09%
072205045	Ubaub	1.6%	1,236	968	▴	1.70%
072205046	Usmad	1.2%	961	1,064	▾	−0.70%
	Total		78,111	69,503	▴	0.81%

=== Climate ===
Climate data for Argao, Cebu
Month	Jan	Feb	Mar	Apr	May	Jun	Jul	Aug	Sep	Oct	Nov	Dec	Year
Mean daily maximum °C (°F)	29 (84)	30 (86)	31 (88)	32 (90)	31 (88)	30 (86)	30 (86)	30 (86)	30 (86)	29 (84)	29 (84)	29 (84)	30 (86)
Mean daily minimum °C (°F)	23 (73)	22 (72)	23 (73)	24 (75)	25 (77)	25 (77)	24 (75)	24 (75)	24 (75)	24 (75)	24 (75)	23 (73)	24 (75)
Average precipitation mm (inches)	42 (1.7)	34 (1.3)	40 (1.6)	61 (2.4)	124 (4.9)	188 (7.4)	190 (7.5)	191 (7.5)	189 (7.4)	186 (7.3)	124 (4.9)	73 (2.9)	1,442 (56.8)
Average rainy days	10.0	8.5	9.5	12.8	22.3	26.8	28.4	27.9	27.3	27.6	20.5	13.1	234.7
Source: Meteoblue (Use with caution: this is modeled/calculated data, not measured locally.)

== Demographics ==
Population census of Argao
Year	Pop.	±% p.a.
1903	35,448	—
1918	39,121	+0.66%
1939	37,331	−0.22%
1948	33,596	−1.16%
1960	32,684	−0.23%
1970	38,039	+1.53%
1975	39,778	+0.90%
1980	44,060	+2.07%
1990	52,157	+1.70%
1995	54,447	+0.81%
2000	61,010	+2.47%
2007	62,226	+0.27%
2010	69,503	+4.11%
2015	72,366	+0.77%
2020	78,187	+1.64%
2024	78,111	−0.02%
Source: Philippine Statistics Authority

== Economy ==
Poverty incidence of Argao (%)

Source: Philippine Statistics Authority

== Tourism ==
The economy of the town of Argao heavily revolves around farming, baking, and tourism. Argao is renowned in Cebu as the "Torta Capital of the Province" because of its local delicacy, the Torta, a Cebuano tart that is inspired from the Spanish tart, but differs in its recipe by using tubâ or palm wine as the rising agent instead of the usual yeast. There are three Cebuano baking towns, the others are Liloan and Santander.

The La Torta Festival, which replaced the Pitlagong Festival in 2011, is the municipality's local food festival in honor of St Michael the Archangel, the patron saint of Argao. La Torta Festival happens every 28–29 September to celebrate Argao's Tart Economy and the torta as an Argaoanon delicacy, as well as cultural heritage from the Spanish period, which includes the tradition of making the torta.

Argao is also a producer of Cebuano tsokolate (chocolate). Much of the cocoa production originates from Argao. The raw cacao, once harvested, is molded, while melted, into disk-shaped tablets called tablea. These are often used in sikwate, a Cebuano version of hot chocolate. The production of chocolate in Argao is said to have been pre-colonial. Maria Cacao, a goddess of the Lantoy Mountain, is said to have been the giver of the cacao tree to the natives of Argao, according to legend. It is said that she and her husband Mangao reside in a cave in that area, surrounded by cacao trees.

Argao is additionally, a producer of vinegar in the province. When the tubâ ferments or when it is aged too long, it becomes sour. It eventually turns into vinegar which is used as sauce or as component for a sauce in main courses. The palm vinegar is referred to as sukang tubâ. It is often accompanied with spices such as garlic and chili peppers and usually comes by the bottle.

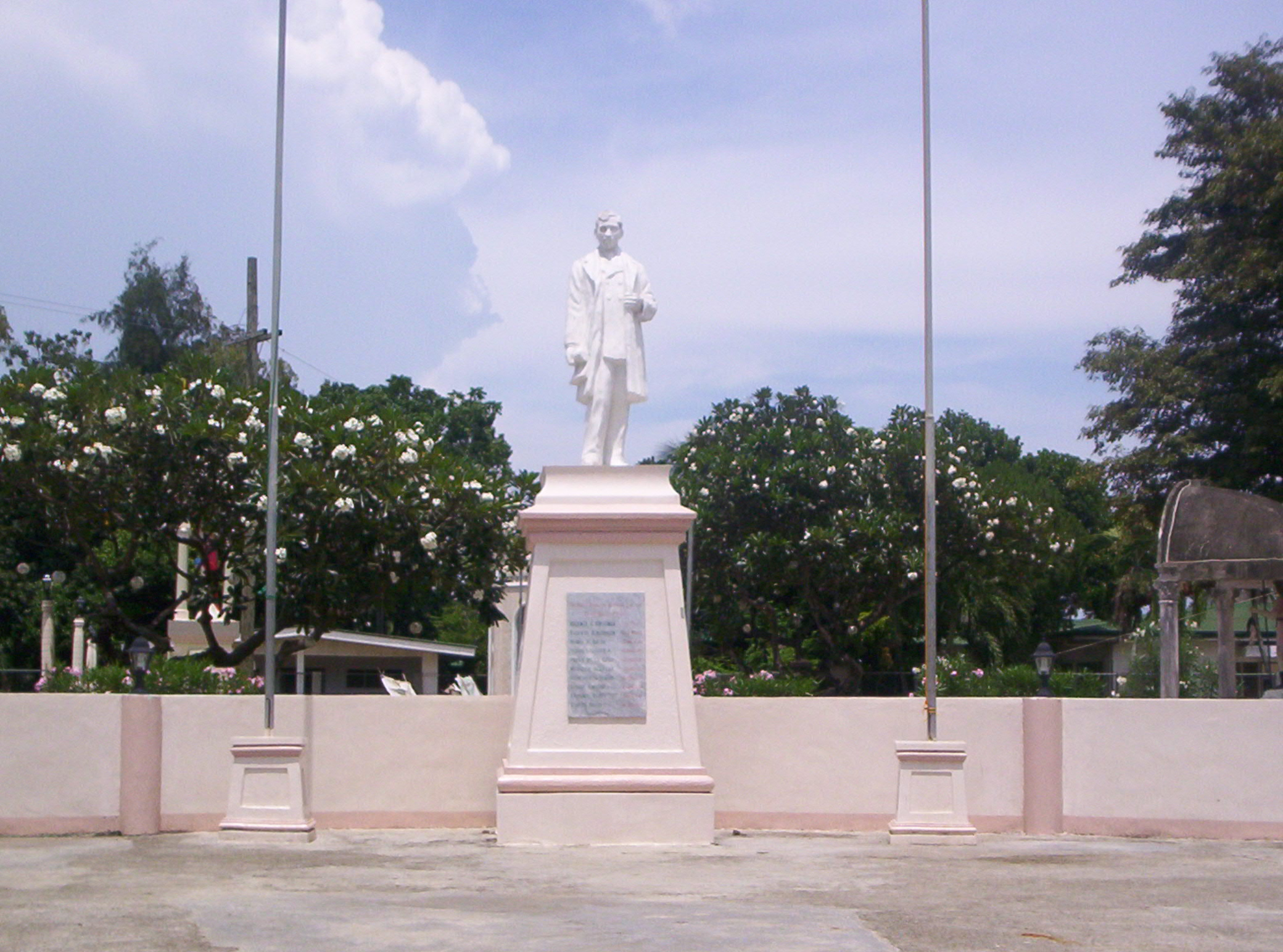
Rizal statue at Municipal plaza

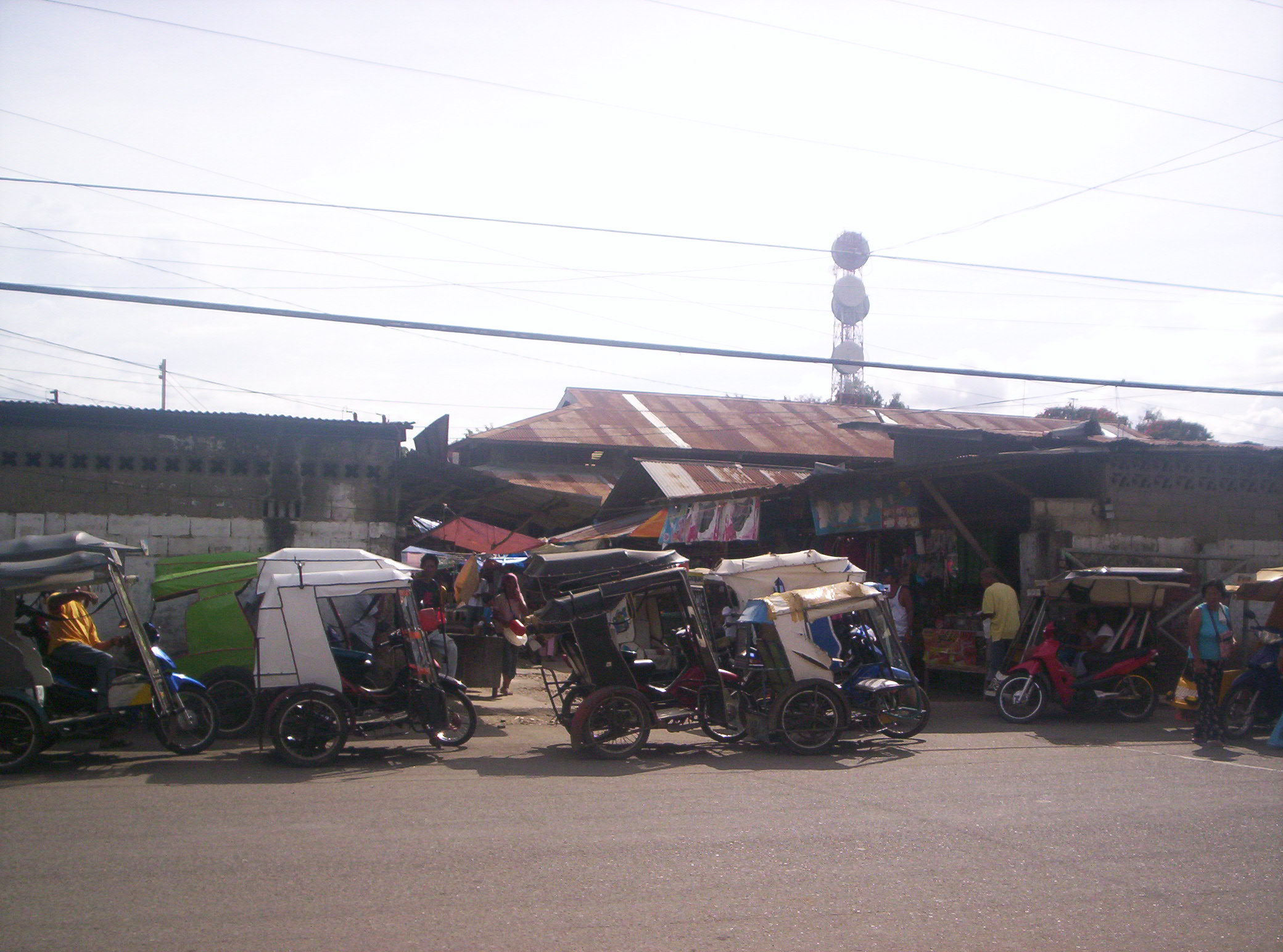
Argao Public Market

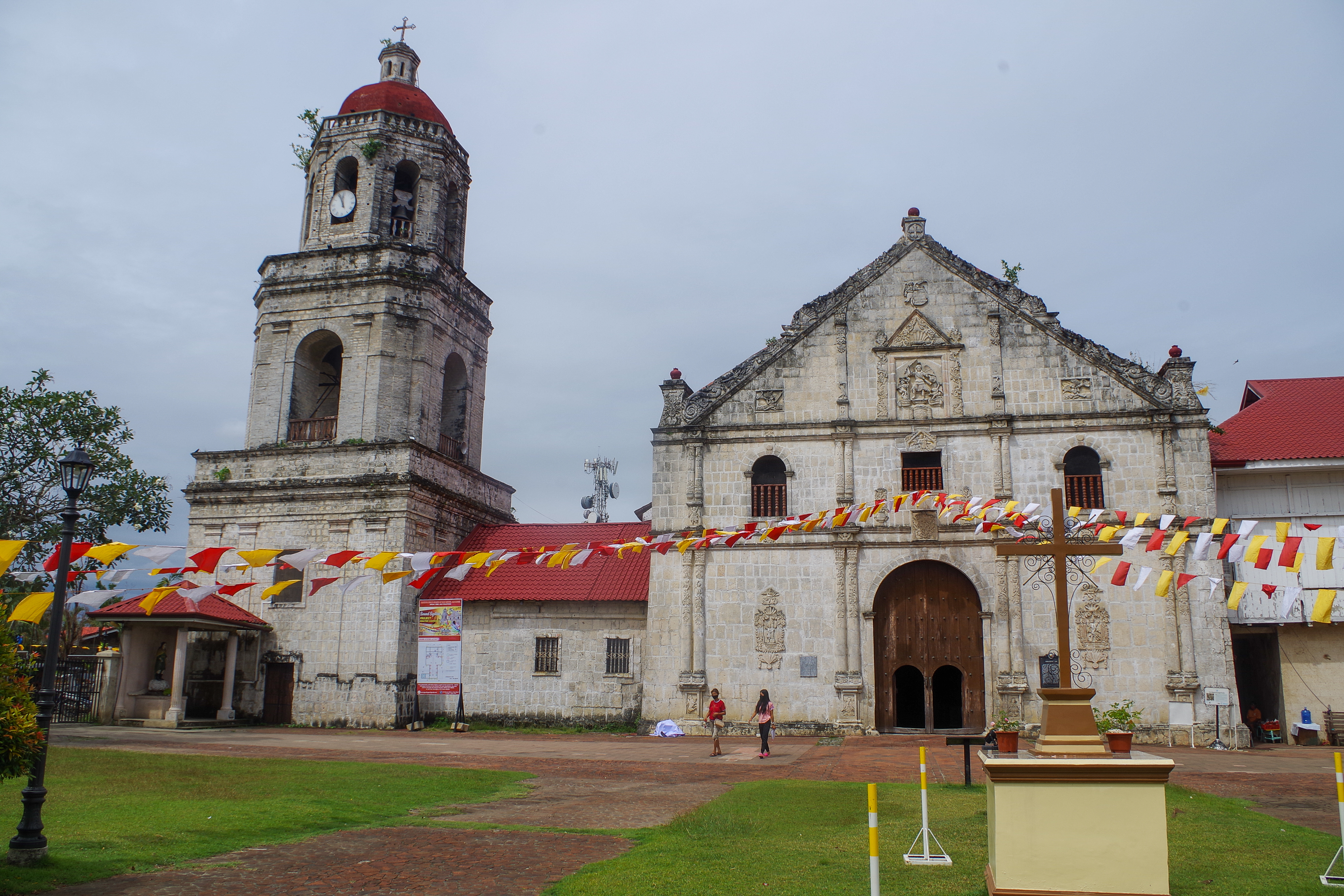
Saint Michael the Archangel Parish Church

Argao Plaza with Hall of Justice

== Education ==
The public schools in the town of Argao are administered by two school districts under the Schools Division of Cebu Province.

Elementary schools:

- Alambijud Elementary School — Alambijud
- Anajao Elementary School — Anajao
- Apo Elementary School — Apo
- Argao I Central Elementary School — N. Bacalso Avenue, Poblacion
- Bala-as Elementary School — Bala-as
- Balisong-Casay Elementary School — Balisong
- Banahao Elementary School — Sitio Banahao, Talaga
- Binlod Elementary School — Binlod
- Bogo Elementary School — Bogo
- Bug-ot Elementary School — Bug-ot
- Bulasa Elementary School — Bulasa
- Butong Elementary School — Butong
- Calagasan Elementary School — Calagasan
- Canbantug Elementary School — Canbantug
- Canbanua Elementary School — Dr. T.S. Kintanar Street, Canbanua
- Candolonon Primary School — Sitio Candolonon, Balisong
- Cansuje Elementary School — Cansuje
- Catang Primary School — Catang
- Colawin Elementary School — Colawin
- Conalum Elementary School — Conalum
- Dalas-ag Primary School — Sitio Dalas-ag, Balisong
- Guiwanon Elementary School — Guiwanon
- Gutlang Elementary School — Gutlang
- Jampang Elementary School — Jampang
- Jomgao Elementary School — Jomgao
- Langtad Elementary School — Langtad
- Langub Elementary School — Langub
- Lapay Elementary School — Lapay
- Lengigon Elementary School — Lengigon
- Linut-od Elementary School — Linut-od
- Mabasa Elementary School — Mabasa
- Malacorong Primary School — Sitio Malacorong, Usmad
- Malalag Elementary School — Sitio Malalag, Ubaub
- Mandilikit Elementary School — Mandilikit
- Mompeller Elementary School — Mompeller
- Nug-as Elementary School — Sitio Nug-as, Cansuje
- Rrcy Elementary School — Sitio Candabong, Binlod
- Sua Elementary School — Sua
- Sumaguan Elementary School — Sumaguan
- Tabayag Elementary School — Tabayag
- Talaga Elementary School — Talaga
- Talaytay Elementary School — Talaytay
- Tiguib Elementary School — Tiguib
- Tulang Elementary School — Tulang
- Tulic Elementary School — Isidro Kintanar Street, Tulic
- Usmad Elementary School — Usmad

High schools:

- Argao National High School — San Miguel Street, Canbanua
- Bulasa National High School — Bulasa
- Calagasan National High School — Calagasan
- Cansuje National High School — Cansuje
- Colawin National High School — Colawin
- Mandilikit National High School — Mandilikit
- Talaga National High School — Talaga
- Usmad National High School — Usmad

Integrated schools:

- Taloot Integrated School — Taloot

== Notable personalities ==
- Cerge Remonde – former Press Secretary, Chairman of Radio Philippines Network, and President and CEO of IBC
- Francisco Remotigue – former Governor of Cebu
- Hilario Davide Jr. – former Chief Justice of the Supreme Court
- Romulo Davide – National Scientist of the Philippines for Nematology and Plant Pathology
- Edsel Galeos – former mayor and current representative for Cebu's 2nd congressional district

== See also ==
- Philippine Science High School Central Visayas Campus
