= 2016 Cebu local elections =

Philippine election

2016 Cebu gubernatorial election
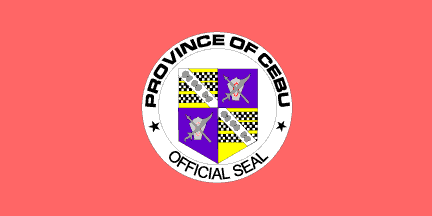
| ← 2013 | May 9, 2016 | 2019 → |
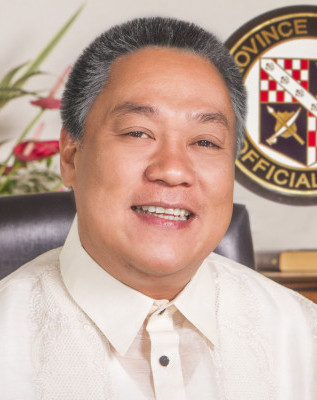

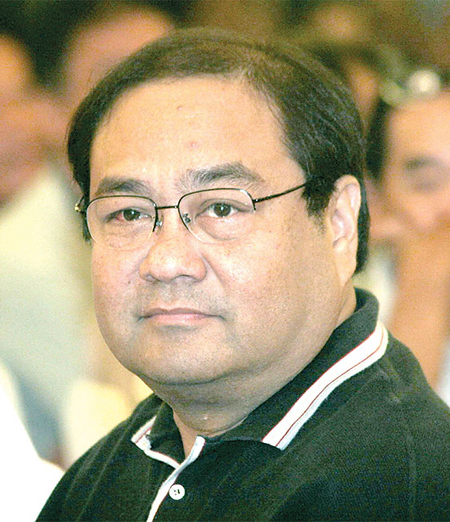
| Nominee | Hilario Davide III | Winston Garcia |
| Party | Liberal | 1-Cebu |
| Running mate | Agnes Magpale | Nerissa Soon-Ruiz |
| Popular vote | 616,381 | 593,725 |
| Percentage | 47.79 | 46.04 |
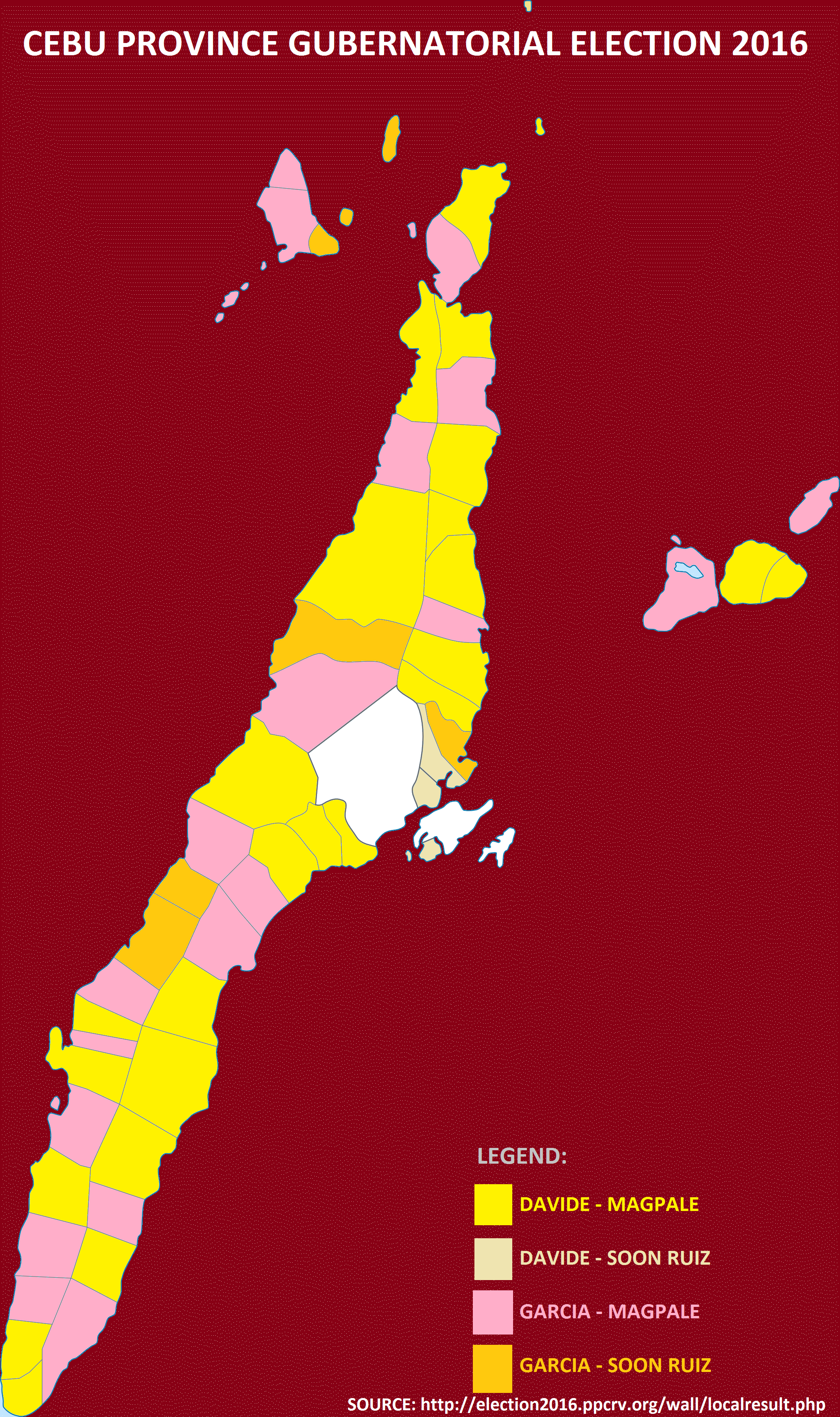
- The candidate with the highest number of votes within each municipality and city for the gubernatorial election. Cebu City and Lapu Lapu City do not vote for provincial officials.
Governor before election
Hilario Davide III
Liberal
Elected Governor
Hilario Davide III
Liberal

Local elections were held in Cebu on May 9, 2016, as part of the 2016 Philippine general election. Voters selected from among candidates for all local positions: a town mayor, vice mayor and town councilors, as well as members of the Sangguniang Panlalawigan, the vice-governor, governor and representatives for the seven districts of Cebu (including two districts of Cebu City and the lone district of Lapu-Lapu City).

== Gubernatorial and Vice Gubernatorial race ==
=== Governor ===
Incumbent Governor Hilario Davide III is running for a second term. His main opponent is former Government Service Insurance System President Winston Garcia.

Cebu Gubernatorial election
| Party | Candidate | Votes | % |
|---|---|---|---|
| Liberal | Hilario Davide III | 616,381 | 47.79 |
| 1-Cebu | Winston Garcia | 593,725 | 46.04 |
| Independent | Boyet Cortes | 32,410 | 3.62 |
| Independent | Desiderio Estinozo | 13,352 | 1.04 |
| KBL | Leandro Boy Patalinghug | 10,977 | 0.85 |
| Independent | Nonito Magnanao | 8,518 | 0.66 |
| Total votes | | 1,289,656 | 100.00 |

=== Vice Governor ===
Davide's running mate is incumbent Vice Governor Agnes Magpale while Garcia's running mate is former 6th District Representative Nerissa Soon-Ruiz.

Cebu Vice gubernatorial election
| Party | Candidate | Votes | % |
|---|---|---|---|
| Liberal | Agnes Magpale | 711,570 | 57.97 |
| 1-Cebu | Nerissa Soon-Ruiz | 475,975 | 38.78 |
| Independent | Juanito Montenegro | 39,902 | 3.25 |
| Total votes | | 1,227,447 | 100.00 |

== Congressional race ==
=== 1st District ===
Samsam Gullas is the incumbent.

2016 Philippine House of Representatives election in Cebu's 1st District
| Party | Candidate | Votes | % |
|---|---|---|---|
| Nacionalista | Samsam Gullas | 186,091 | 65.23 |
| NPC | Antonio Canoy | 92,589 | 32.45 |
| PDP–Laban | Michael Nunez | 6,612 | 2.32 |
| Valid ballots | | 285,292 | 88.42 |
| Invalid or blank votes | | 37,380 | 11.58 |
| Total votes | | 322,672 | 100.00 |

=== 2nd District ===
Wilfredo Caminero is the incumbent.

2016 Philippine House of Representatives election in Cebu's 2nd District
| Party | Candidate | Votes | % |
|---|---|---|---|
| Liberal | Wilfredo Caminero | 81,167 | 80.75 |
| 1-Cebu | Teresita Celis | 11,893 | 11.83 |
| UNA | Cora Lou Kintanar | 7,453 | 7.41 |
| Valid ballots | | 100,513 | 80.65 |
| Invalid or blank votes | | 24,108 | 19.35 |
| Total votes | | 124,621 | 100.00 |

=== 3rd District ===
Gwendolyn Garcia is the incumbent.

2016 Philippine House of Representatives election in Cebu's 3rd District
| Party | Candidate | Votes | % |
|---|---|---|---|
| UNA | Gwendolyn Garcia | 139,923 | 62.20 |
| Liberal | Grecilda Sanchez-Zaballero | 82,830 | 36.82 |
| Independent | Teodoro Osorio | 2,206 | 0.98 |
| Total votes | | 224,959 | 100.00 |

=== 4th District ===
Benhur Salimbangon is the incumbent.

2016 Philippine House of Representatives election in Cebu's 4th District
| Party | Candidate | Votes | % |
|---|---|---|---|
| NUP | Benhur Salimbangon | 132,548 | 61.00 |
| Liberal | Celestino Martinez, Jr. | 85,107 | 39.00 |
| Total votes | | 217,655 | 100.00 |

=== 5th District ===
Joseph Ace Durano is not running, his brother Ramon Durano VI is the party's nominee.

2016 Philippine House of Representatives election in Cebu's 5th District
| Party | Candidate | Votes | % |
|---|---|---|---|
| NPC | Ramon Durano VI | 168,650 | 87.49 |
| UNA | Gilbert Wagas | 24,122 | 12.51 |
| Total votes | | 192,772 | 100.00 |

=== 6th District ===
Gabriel Luis Quisumbing is running for Mayor of Mandaue City, Incumbent mayor Jonas Cortes is the party's nominee.

2016 Philippine House of Representatives election in Cebu's 6th District
| Party | Candidate | Votes | % |
|---|---|---|---|
| Liberal | Jonas Cortes | 154,524 | 72.51 |
| 1-Cebu | Paulus Cañete | 58,586 | 27.49 |
| Total votes | | 213,110 | 100.00 |

=== 7th District ===
Pablo John Garcia will run for the newly created 7th District against Board Member Peter John Calderon. If he wins, he will join his sister Gwendolyn in the House of Representatives respectively.

2016 Philippine House of Representatives election in Cebu's 7th District
| Party | Candidate | Votes | % |
|---|---|---|---|
| Liberal | Peter John Calderon | 57,798 | 57.14 |
| 1-Cebu | Pablo John Garcia | 43,347 | 42.86 |
| Total votes | | 101,145 | 100.00 |

=== Cebu City ===
==== 1st District ====
Raul del Mar is the incumbent.

2016 Philippine House of Representatives election in Cebu City's 1st District
| Party | Candidate | Votes | % |
|---|---|---|---|
| Liberal | Raul del Mar | 134,940 | 66.26 |
| UNA | Alvin Garcia | 64,348 | 31.60 |
| Independent | Ricardo Adlawan | 2,400 | 1.18 |
| Independent | Juan Arenasa | 1,952 | 0.96 |
| Total votes | | 203,640 | 100.00 |

==== 2nd District ====
Rodrigo Abellanosa is the incumbent.

2016 Philippine House of Representatives election in Cebu City's 2nd District
| Party | Candidate | Votes | % |
|---|---|---|---|
| Liberal | Rodrigo Abellanosa | 148,838 | 59.26 |
| UNA | Gerardo Carillo | 97,293 | 38.74 |
| Independent | Lea Ong | 5,013 | 2.00 |
| Total votes | | 251,144 | 100.00 |

=== Lapu-Lapu City ===
Aileen Radaza is the incumbent.

2016 Philippine House of Representatives election in Lapu-Lapu City's Lone District
| Party | Candidate | Votes | % |
|---|---|---|---|
| Liberal | Aileen Radaza | 86,069 | 64.63 |
| PDP–Laban | Celsi Sitoy | 33,043 | 24.81 |
| UNA | Reynaldo Berdin | 5,967 | 4.48 |
| Independent | Paulo Cabahug | 3,875 | 2.90 |
| NPC | Rene Espina | 2,364 | 1.77 |
| Independent | Niño Luis Jamili | 1,038 | 0.77 |
| PGRP | Junex Doronio | 807 | 0.60 |
| Valid ballots | | 133,163 | 84.18 |
| Invalid or blank votes | | 25,027 | 15.82 |
| Total votes | | 158,190 | 100.00 |

== Sangguniang Panlalawigan ==
=== 1st District ===
Cebu 1st District Sangguniang Panlalawigan election
| Party | Candidate | Votes | % |
|---|---|---|---|
| Nacionalista | Yolanda Daan | | |
| Nacionalista | Raul Bacaltos | | |
| Liberal | Ramonito Alcoseba | | |
| 1-Cebu | Cesar Albor | | |
| KBL | Eduardo Adlawan | | |
| Independent | Manuel Sanchez | | |
| Independent | Danilo Santinitigan | | |
| PROMDI | Oscar Canton | | |
| PDP–Laban | Abet Oliver Oro | | |
| KBL | Alberto Patalinghug | | |
| Total votes | | | |

=== 2nd District ===
Cebu 2nd District Sangguniang Panlalawigan election
| Party | Candidate | Votes | % |
|---|---|---|---|
| 1-Cebu | Andrade Alcantara | | |
| Liberal | Raymund Joseph Calderon | | |
| Independent | Edsel Galeos | | |
| PMP | Carmiano Kintanar | | |
| Independent | Edgar Pangandoyon | | |
| 1-Cebu | Jose Mari Salvador | | |
| Total votes | | | |

=== 3rd District ===
Cebu 3rd District Sangguniang Panlalawigan election
| Party | Candidate | Votes | % |
|---|---|---|---|
| Independent | Farid Baena | | |
| PMP | Alex Binghay | | |
| Independent | Victoria Corominas | | |
| Independent | Bernardo Desabelle | | |
| Independent | Jorge Guerrero | | |
| Independent | Alexander Nunez | | |
| 1-Cebu | Rheamae Paran | | |
| Liberal | Jefferey Anthony Yapha | | |
| Total votes | | | |

=== 4th District ===
Cebu 4th District Sangguniang Panlalawigan election
| Party | Candidate | Votes | % |
|---|---|---|---|
| Independent | Boyet Bantilan | | |
| NUP | Chad Kenneth Cañares | | |
| Liberal | Horacio Franco | | |
| Liberal | Jose Ribomapel Holganza, Jr. | | |
| Independent | Oscar Monzales | | |
| Independent | Randolph Rivera | | |
| NUP | Sun Shimura | | |
| Total votes | | | |

=== 5th District ===
Cebu 5th District Sangguniang Panlalawigan election
| Party | Candidate | Votes | % |
|---|---|---|---|
| 1-Cebu | Recto de Dios | | |
| UNA | Abel Dondoyanon | | |
| 1-Cebu | Miguel Maestrado | | |
| Liberal | Miguel Magpale | | |
| Liberal | Jude Thaddeus Sybico | | |
| Total votes | | | |

=== 6th District ===
Cebu 6th District Sangguniang Panlalawigan election
| Party | Candidate | Votes | % |
|---|---|---|---|
| Liberal | Julius Alegado | | |
| Liberal | Glen Bercede | | |
| 1-Cebu | Victor Maambong | | |
| 1-Cebu | Jonkie Teddy Ouano | | |
| Total votes | | | |

=== 7th District ===
Cebu 7th District Sangguniang Panlalawigan election
| Party | Candidate | Votes | % |
|---|---|---|---|
| Liberal | Christopher Baricuatro | | |
| 1-Cebu | Maria Fema Duterte | | |
| Liberal | Jerome Christian Librando | | |
| PDP–Laban | Godofredo Lucero | | |
| 1-Cebu | Salvador Saromines | | |
| Total votes | | | |

== City and Municipality elections ==
=== 1st District, Mayoral Elections ===
==== Carcar ====
Carcar mayoral election
| Party | Candidate | Votes | % |
|---|---|---|---|
| Liberal | Yayoy Alcoseba | | |
| Nacionalista | Nicepuro Apura | | |
| Independent | Vicente Balberona, Jr. | | |
| Independent | Jun Sollano | | |
| Total votes | | | |

==== Naga City ====
Naga City Mayoral election
| Party | Candidate | Votes | % |
|---|---|---|---|
| Nacionalista | Kristine Vanessa Chiong | 38,260 | 75.17 |
| Liberal | Venci del Mar | 12,638 | 24.83 |
| Total votes | | 50,898 | 100.00 |

==== Talisay City ====
Talisay City Mayoral election
| Party | Candidate | Votes | % |
|---|---|---|---|
| Nacionalista | Eduardo Gullas | 58,068 | |
| Liberal | Johnny delos Reyes | 22,855 | |
| NPC | Romeo Villarante | 12,524 | |
| Independent | Ara Capala-Go | 358 | |
| Independent | Kurt Parami | 149 | |
| Total votes | | | |

==== Minglanilla ====
Minglanilla Mayoral election
| Party | Candidate | Votes | % |
|---|---|---|---|
| Liberal | Marlo Cañada | | |
| 1-Cebu | Alexander Cañares | | |
| Nacionalista | Elanito Peña | | |
| Total votes | | | |

==== San Fernando ====
San Fernando Mayoral election
| Party | Candidate | Votes | % |
|---|---|---|---|
| NPC | Miguel Antonio Canoy | | |
| Nacionalista | Lakambini Reluya | | |
| Total votes | | | |

==== Sibonga ====
Sibonga Mayoral election
| Party | Candidate | Votes | % |
|---|---|---|---|
| Nacionalista | Caroline Bacaltos | | |
| Liberal | Ferdinand Ponce | | |
| KBL | TQ Vilocura, Jr. | | |
| Total votes | | | |

=== 2nd District, Mayoral Elections ===
==== Alcoy ====
Alcoy Mayoral election
| Party | Candidate | Votes | % |
|---|---|---|---|
| 1-Cebu | Michael Sestoso | | |
| Liberal | Eugene Singson | | |
| Total votes | | | |

==== Argao ====
Argao Mayoral election
| Party | Candidate | Votes | % |
|---|---|---|---|
| Liberal | Stanley Caminero | | |
| UNA | Eddie Lanticse | | |
| 1-Cebu | RJ Miranda | | |
| Total votes | | | |

==== Boljoon ====
Boljoon Mayoral election
| Party | Candidate | Votes | % |
|---|---|---|---|
| 1-Cebu | Alexseus Celis | | |
| Liberal | Merlou Derama | | |
| Total votes | | | |

==== Dalaguete ====
Dalaguete Mayoral election
| Party | Candidate | Votes | % |
|---|---|---|---|
| 1-Cebu | LD Almagro | | |
| Liberal | Ronald Allan Cesante | | |
| Total votes | | | |

==== Oslob ====
Oslob Mayoral election
| Party | Candidate | Votes | % |
|---|---|---|---|
| 1-Cebu | Amelita Guaren | | |
| Liberal | Jun Tumulak | | |
| Independent | Sheiryl Viñas | | |
| Total votes | | | |

==== Samboan ====
Samboan Mayoral election
| Party | Candidate | Votes | % |
|---|---|---|---|
| Liberal | Emerito Calderon, Sr. | | |
| 1-Cebu | Boy Capa | | |
| Total votes | | | |

==== Santander ====
Santander Mayoral election
| Party | Candidate | Votes | % |
|---|---|---|---|
| 1-Cebu | Undo Luzano | | |
| Liberal | Bebe Wenceslao | | |
| Total votes | | | |

=== 3rd District, Mayoral Elections ===
==== Toledo City ====
Toledo City Mayoral election
| Party | Candidate | Votes | % |
|---|---|---|---|
| Independent | Rudy Espinosa | | |
| Liberal | James Gaite | | |
| Independent | John Henry Osmeña | | |
| Independent | Boy Tomarong | | |
| Total votes | | | |

==== Aloguinsan ====
Aloguinsan Mayoral election
| Party | Candidate | Votes | % |
|---|---|---|---|
| Liberal | Lito Chua | | |
| Independent | Chonse Moreno | | |
| Total votes | | | |

==== Asturias ====
Asturias Mayoral election
| Party | Candidate | Votes | % |
|---|---|---|---|
| Liberal | Joel Dumdum | | |
| 1-Cebu | Anto Pintor | | |
| Independent | Tommy Yu | | |
| Total votes | | | |

==== Balamban ====
Balamban Mayoral election
| Party | Candidate | Votes | % |
|---|---|---|---|
| Independent | Ace Binghay | | |
| PDP–Laban | Dave Karamihan | | |
| Total votes | | | |

==== Barili ====
Barili Mayoral election
| Party | Candidate | Votes | % |
|---|---|---|---|
| 1-Cebu | Marlon Garcia | | |
| Liberal | Jay Ruiz | | |
| Total votes | | | |

==== Pinamungajan ====
Pinamungajan Mayoral election
| Party | Candidate | Votes | % |
|---|---|---|---|
| 1-Cebu | Glenn Baricuatro | | |
| Liberal | Gaye Yapha | | |
| KBL | Ondotiago Ygay | | |
| Total votes | | | |

==== Tuburan ====
Tuburan Mayoral election
| Party | Candidate | Votes | % |
|---|---|---|---|
| Liberal | Democrito Diamante | 17,140 | |
| 1-Cebu | Daphne Lagon | 17,094 | |
| Independent | Ado Pesiao | 68 | |
| Total votes | | | |

=== 4th District, Mayoral Elections ===
==== Bogo ====
Bogo Mayoral election
| Party | Candidate | Votes | % |
|---|---|---|---|
| Liberal | Carlo Martinez | 29,092 | |
| NUP | Steve Siclot | 8,334 | |
| Total votes | | | |

==== Bantayan ====
Bantayan Mayoral election
| Party | Candidate | Votes | % |
|---|---|---|---|
| PROMDI | Art Despi | | |
| NUP | Ian Christopher Escario | | |
| Independent | Cesar Mansueto | | |
| Total votes | | | |

==== Daanbantayan ====
Daanbantayan Mayoral election
| Party | Candidate | Votes | % |
|---|---|---|---|
| UNA | Vic Loot | 20,412 | 50.01 |
| Liberal | Dodong Corro | 20,405 | 49.99 |
| Total votes | | 40,817 | 100.00 |

==== Madridejos ====
Madridejos Mayoral election
| Party | Candidate | Votes | % |
|---|---|---|---|
| Liberal | Jay Dela Fuente | | |
| NUP | Julius Villaceran | | |
| Total votes | | | |

==== Medellin ====
Medellin Mayoral election
| Party | Candidate | Votes | % |
|---|---|---|---|
| Liberal | Benjun Mondigo | | |
| NUP | Ricardo Ramirez IV | | |
| Independent | Olibeb Godinez Rojas | | |
| Independent | Petronilo Villarin | | |
| Total votes | | | |

==== San Remigio ====
San Remigio Mayoral election
| Party | Candidate | Votes | % |
|---|---|---|---|
| Liberal | Mar Martinez | 16,182 | |
| NUP | Jay Olivar | 13,385 | |
| Total votes | | | |

==== Santa Fe ====
Santa Fe Mayoral election
| Party | Candidate | Votes | % |
|---|---|---|---|
| PROMDI | Romeo Baitancilla | | |
| 1-Cebu | Dory Cabrera | | |
| Liberal | Jose Esgana | | |
| NUP | Renato Saagundo | | |
| Total votes | | | |

==== Tabogon ====
Tabogon Mayoral election
| Party | Candidate | Votes | % |
|---|---|---|---|
| Independent | Roel Amistoso | | |
| KSN | Zigfred Duterte | | |
| Liberal | Roding Sinoy | | |
| Total votes | | | |

==== Tabuelan ====
Tabuelan Mayoral election
| Party | Candidate | Votes | % |
|---|---|---|---|
| KSN | Rex Casiano Gerona | | |
| Total votes | | | |

=== 5th District, Mayoral Elections ===
==== Danao ====
Danao mayoral election
| Party | Candidate | Votes | % |
|---|---|---|---|
| BAKUD | Ramon Durano III | | |
| 1-Cebu | Michael Enriquez | | |
| Total votes | | | |

==== Borbon ====
Borbon Mayoral election
| Party | Candidate | Votes | % |
|---|---|---|---|
| 1-Cebu | Noel Dotillos | | |
| CDPP | Levi Manalili | | |
| BAKUD | Neal Vergara | | |
| Total votes | | | |

==== Carmen ====
Carmen Mayoral election
| Party | Candidate | Votes | % |
|---|---|---|---|
| Independent | James Camara | | |
| UNA | Sonia Pua | | |
| BAKUD | Gerard Villamor | | |
| Total votes | | | |

==== Catmon ====
Catmon Mayoral election
| Party | Candidate | Votes | % |
|---|---|---|---|
| 1-Cebu | Celso Bustamante | | |
| Independent | Ceasar Coloscos | | |
| BAKUD | Dan Jusay | | |
| Total votes | | | |

==== Compostela ====
Compostela Mayoral election
| Party | Candidate | Votes | % |
|---|---|---|---|
| BAKUD | Joel Quiño | | |
| UNA | Ritchie Wagas | | |
| Total votes | | | |

==== Liloan ====
Liloan Mayoral election
| Party | Candidate | Votes | % |
|---|---|---|---|
| 1-Cebu | Christina Frasco | 29,410 | |
| BAKUD | Lito Pilapil | 18,718 | |
| Independent | Edeliso Pilones | 1,148 | |
| Total votes | | | |

==== Pilar ====
Pilar Mayoral election
| Party | Candidate | Votes | % |
|---|---|---|---|
| Independent | Persi Fernandez | | |
| 1-Cebu | Dodong Fracion Maratas | | |
| BAKUD | Cesar Tabasa | | |
| Total votes | | | |

==== Poro ====
Poro Mayoral election
| Party | Candidate | Votes | % |
|---|---|---|---|
| 1-Cebu | Jay Estrera | | |
| BAKUD | Boy Rama | | |
| Total votes | | | |

==== San Francisco ====
San Francisco Mayoral election
| Party | Candidate | Votes | % |
|---|---|---|---|
| BAKUD | Aly Arquillano | | |
| 1-Cebu | Margarito Maningo, Jr. | | |
| PGRP | Adolfo Resplandor | | |
| Total votes | | | |

==== Sogod ====
Sogod Mayoral election
| Party | Candidate | Votes | % |
|---|---|---|---|
| 1-Cebu | Dean Severo Dosado | | |
| BAKUD | Lissa Durano-Streegan | | |
| Total votes | | | |

==== Tudela ====
Tudela Mayoral election
| Party | Candidate | Votes | % |
|---|---|---|---|
| 1-Cebu | Loreto Maratas | | |
| BAKUD | Erwin Yu | | |
| Total votes | | | |

=== 6th District, Mayoral Elections ===
==== Mandaue City ====
Mandaue City Mayoral election
| Party | Candidate | Votes | % |
|---|---|---|---|
| Liberal | Luigi Quisumbing | 85,433 | 56.77 |
| 1-Cebu | Emmarie Ouano-Dizon | 65,055 | 43.23 |
| Total votes | | 150,488 | 100.00 |

==== Consolacion ====
Consolacion Mayoral election
| Party | Candidate | Votes | % |
|---|---|---|---|
| UNA | Analee Gungob | | |
| Liberal | Teresa Pepito-Alegado | | |
| Total votes | | | |

==== Cordova ====
Cordova Mayoral election
| Party | Candidate | Votes | % |
|---|---|---|---|
| Liberal | Mary Therese Cho | 16,755 | |
| PDP–Laban | Arleigh Sitoy | 5,115 | |
| KBL | Paul Villaber | 4,074 | |
| Independent | Licel Sancover | 152 | |
| Total votes | | | |

=== 7th District, Mayoral Elections ===
==== Alcantara ====
Alcantara Mayoral election
| Party | Candidate | Votes | % |
|---|---|---|---|
| Liberal | Beatriz Caburnay | | |
| 1-Cebu | Conchita Cañete | | |
| Total votes | | | |

==== Alegria ====
Alegria Mayoral election
| Party | Candidate | Votes | % |
|---|---|---|---|
| 1-Cebu | Maria Leticia Donayre | | |
| Liberal | Verna Magallon | | |
| Total votes | | | |

==== Badian ====
Badian Mayoral election
| Party | Candidate | Votes | % |
|---|---|---|---|
| 1-Cebu | Roburrt Librando | | |
| Liberal | Carmencita Lumain | | |
| Total votes | | | |

==== Dumanjug ====
Dumanjug Mayoral election
| Party | Candidate | Votes | % |
|---|---|---|---|
| 1-Cebu | Nelson Garcia | | |
| Liberal | Efren Gica | | |
| Total votes | | | |

==== Ginatilan ====
Ginatilan Mayoral election
| Party | Candidate | Votes | % |
|---|---|---|---|
| Liberal | Dean Michael Singco | | |
| 1-Cebu | Liza Toledo | | |
| Total votes | | | |

==== Malabuyoc ====
Malabuyoc Mayoral election
| Party | Candidate | Votes | % |
|---|---|---|---|
| Independent | Paye Carcueva | | |
| 1-Cebu | Lito Creus | | |
| Liberal | Edang Piedad | | |
| Total votes | | | |

==== Moalboal ====
Moalboal Mayoral election
| Party | Candidate | Votes | % |
|---|---|---|---|
| Liberal | Titing Cabaron | | |
| Independent | Ricky Domugho | | |
| Independent | Ray Mendoza | | |
| Total votes | | | |

==== Ronda ====
Ronda Mayoral election
| Party | Candidate | Votes | % |
|---|---|---|---|
| Liberal | Nonie Blanco | | |
| 1-Cebu | Moymoy Ungab | | |
| Total votes | | | |

=== Cebu City, Mayoral Elections ===
Cebu City Mayoral election
| Party | Candidate | Votes | % |
|---|---|---|---|
| Liberal | Tomas Osmeña | 266,819 | 53.39 |
| UNA | Michael Rama | 232,925 | 46.61 |
| Total votes | | 499,744 | 100.00 |

=== Lapu-Lapu City, Mayoral Elections ===
Lapu-Lapu City Mayoral election
| Party | Candidate | Votes | % |
|---|---|---|---|
| Liberal | Paz Radaza | 83,330 | 57.42 |
| PDP–Laban | Lando Patalinjug | 41,291 | 28.45 |
| NPC | Jun Pelaez | 13,330 | 9.19 |
| UNA | Angel Rodriguez | 5,978 | 4.12 |
| Independent | Paul Cabahug | 1,057 | 0.73 |
| PGRP | Benjamin Gara | 126 | 0.09 |
| Total votes | | 145,112 | 100.00 |
