= Cebu's 7th congressional district =

Legislative district of the Philippines

- Constituency for the House of Representatives of the Philippines
- Boundary of Cebu's 7th congressional district in Cebu

- Location of Cebu within the Philippines
- Province: Cebu
- Region: Central Visayas
- Population: 238,699 (2020)
- Electorate: 163,095 (2022)
- Major settlements: 8 LGUs: Municipalities; Alcantara; Alegria; Badian; Dumanjug; Ginatilan; Malabuyoc; Moalboal; Ronda
- Area: 641.62 km^{2} (247.73 sq mi)

Current constituency
- Created: 1907
- Representative: Patricia Calderon
- Political party: NPC; 1CEBU
- Congressional bloc: Majority

Cebu's 7th congressional district is one of the seven congressional districts of the Philippines in the province of Cebu. It was represented in the House of Representatives of the Philippines from 1916 to 1972, and again since 2016. It was also earlier represented in the Philippine Assembly from 1907 to 1916. The district consists of the southwestern municipalities of Alcantara, Alegria, Badian, Dumanjug, Ginatilan, Malabuyoc, Moalboal and Ronda. It is currently represented in the 20th Congress by Patricia Calderon of the Nationalist People's Coalition (NPC) and One Cebu (1CEBU).

Prior to its second dissolution in 1972, the district encompassed the northwestern Cebu municipalities of Asturias, Balamban, Bantayan, Daanbantayan, Madridejos, Medellin, San Remigio, Santa Fe, Tabuelan, and Tuburan.

== Representation history ==
#	Image	Member	Term of office		Legislature	Party	Electoral history	Constituent LGUs
#	Image	Member	Start	End	Legislature	Party	Electoral history	Constituent LGUs
=== Cebu's 7th district for the Philippine Assembly ===
District created January 9, 1907.
1		Pedro Rodríguez	October 16, 1907	October 16, 1909	1st	Nacionalista	Elected in 1907.	1907–1909; Asturias, Balamban, Bantayan, Daanbantayan, Medellin, San Remigio, Tuburan
2		Eulalio E. Causing	October 16, 1909	October 13, 1914	2nd	Nacionalista	Elected in 1909.	1909–1916; Asturias, Balamban, Bantayan, Daanbantayan, Medellin, San Remigio, Santa Fe, Tuburan
2		Eulalio E. Causing	October 16, 1909	October 13, 1914	3rd	Nacionalista	Re-elected in 1912. Resigned.	1909–1916; Asturias, Balamban, Bantayan, Daanbantayan, Medellin, San Remigio, Santa Fe, Tuburan
3		Tomás N. Alonso	November 21, 1914	October 16, 1916	3rd	Nacionalista	Elected in 1914 to finish Causing's term.	1909–1916; Asturias, Balamban, Bantayan, Daanbantayan, Medellin, San Remigio, Santa Fe, Tuburan
=== Cebu's 7th district for the House of Representatives of the Philippine Islands ===
(3)		Tomás N. Alonso	October 16, 1916	June 3, 1919	4th	Nacionalista	Re-elected in 1916.	1916–1919; Asturias, Balamban, Bantayan, Daanbantayan, Medellin, San Remigio, Santa Fe, Tuburan
4		José Alonso	June 3, 1919	June 2, 1925	5th	Nacionalista	Elected in 1919.	1919–1935; Asturias, Balamban, Bantayan, Daanbantayan, Madridejos, Medellin, San Remigio, Santa Fe, Tuburan
4		José Alonso	June 3, 1919	June 2, 1925	6th	Nacionalista; Unipersonalista	Re-elected in 1922.	1919–1935; Asturias, Balamban, Bantayan, Daanbantayan, Madridejos, Medellin, San Remigio, Santa Fe, Tuburan
5		Paulino Ybáñez	June 2, 1925	May 1, 1934	7th	Nacionalista; Consolidado	Elected in 1925.	1919–1935; Asturias, Balamban, Bantayan, Daanbantayan, Madridejos, Medellin, San Remigio, Santa Fe, Tuburan
5		Paulino Ybáñez	June 2, 1925	May 1, 1934	8th	Nacionalista; Consolidado	Re-elected in 1928.	1919–1935; Asturias, Balamban, Bantayan, Daanbantayan, Madridejos, Medellin, San Remigio, Santa Fe, Tuburan
5		Paulino Ybáñez	June 2, 1925	May 1, 1934	9th	Nacionalista; Consolidado	Re-elected in 1931. Died.	1919–1935; Asturias, Balamban, Bantayan, Daanbantayan, Madridejos, Medellin, San Remigio, Santa Fe, Tuburan
6		Buenaventura Rodríguez	June 5, 1934	September 16, 1935	10th	Nacionalista; Demócrata Pro-Independencia	Elected in 1934.	1919–1935; Asturias, Balamban, Bantayan, Daanbantayan, Madridejos, Medellin, San Remigio, Santa Fe, Tuburan
#	Image	Member	Term of office		National Assembly	Party	Electoral history	Constituent LGUs
#	Image	Member	Start	End	National Assembly	Party	Electoral history	Constituent LGUs
=== Cebu's 7th district for the National Assembly (Commonwealth of the Philippines) ===
(6)		Buenaventura Rodríguez	September 16, 1935	December 30, 1938	1st	Nacionalista; Demócrata Pro-Independencia	Re-elected in 1935.	1935–1941; Asturias, Balamban, Bantayan, Daanbantayan, Madridejos, Medellin, San Remigio, Santa Fe, Tuburan
7		Roque Desquitado	December 30, 1938	December 30, 1941	2nd	Nacionalista	Elected in 1938.	1935–1941; Asturias, Balamban, Bantayan, Daanbantayan, Madridejos, Medellin, San Remigio, Santa Fe, Tuburan
District dissolved into the two-seat Cebu's at-large district for the National Assembly (Second Philippine Republic).
#	Image	Member	Term of office		Common wealth Congress	Party	Electoral history	Constituent LGUs
#	Image	Member	Start	End	Common wealth Congress	Party	Electoral history	Constituent LGUs
=== Cebu's 7th district for the House of Representatives of the Commonwealth of the Philippines ===
District re-created May 24, 1945.
8		José V. Rodríguez	June 9, 1945	May 25, 1946	1st	Nacionalista	Elected in 1941.	1945–1946; Asturias, Balamban, Bantayan, Daanbantayan, Madridejos, Medellin, San Remigio, Santa Fe, Tuburan
#	Image	Member	Term of office		Congress	Party	Electoral history	Constituent LGUs
#	Image	Member	Start	End	Congress	Party	Electoral history	Constituent LGUs
=== Cebu's 7th district for the House of Representatives of the Philippines ===
(8)		José V. Rodríguez	May 25, 1946	December 30, 1949	1st	Nacionalista	Re-elected in 1946.	1946–1953; Asturias, Balamban, Bantayan, Daanbantayan, Madridejos, Medellin, San Remigio, Santa Fe, Tuburan
9		Nicolás Escario	December 30, 1949	December 30, 1957	2nd	Liberal	Elected in 1949.	1946–1953; Asturias, Balamban, Bantayan, Daanbantayan, Madridejos, Medellin, San Remigio, Santa Fe, Tuburan
9		Nicolás Escario	December 30, 1949	December 30, 1957	3rd	Liberal	Re-elected in 1953.	1953–1972; Asturias, Balamban, Bantayan, Daanbantayan, Madridejos, Medellin, San Remigio, Santa Fe, Tabuelan, Tuburan
10		Antonio Y. de Pio	December 30, 1957	December 30, 1961	4th	Nacionalista	Elected in 1957.	1953–1972; Asturias, Balamban, Bantayan, Daanbantayan, Madridejos, Medellin, San Remigio, Santa Fe, Tabuelan, Tuburan
11		Tereso P. Dúmon	December 30, 1961	December 30, 1969	5th	Nacionalista	Elected in 1961.	1953–1972; Asturias, Balamban, Bantayan, Daanbantayan, Madridejos, Medellin, San Remigio, Santa Fe, Tabuelan, Tuburan
11		Tereso P. Dúmon	December 30, 1961	December 30, 1969	6th	Nacionalista	Re-elected in 1965.	1953–1972; Asturias, Balamban, Bantayan, Daanbantayan, Madridejos, Medellin, San Remigio, Santa Fe, Tabuelan, Tuburan
12		Celestino N. Sybico Jr.	December 30, 1969	September 23, 1972	7th	Nacionalista	Elected in 1969. Removed from office after imposition of martial law.	1953–1972; Asturias, Balamban, Bantayan, Daanbantayan, Madridejos, Medellin, San Remigio, Santa Fe, Tabuelan, Tuburan
District dissolved into the thirteen-seat Region VII's at-large district for the Interim Batasang Pambansa, followed by the six-seat Cebu's at-large district for the Regular Batasang Pambansa.
District re-created September 18, 2015.
13		Peter John Calderon	June 30, 2016	June 30, 2025	17th	NPC	Elected in 2016.	2016–present Alcantara, Alegria, Badian, Dumanjug, Ginatilan, Malabuyoc, Moalboal, Ronda
13		Peter John Calderon	June 30, 2016	June 30, 2025	18th	NPC	Re-elected in 2019.	2016–present Alcantara, Alegria, Badian, Dumanjug, Ginatilan, Malabuyoc, Moalboal, Ronda
13		Peter John Calderon	June 30, 2016	June 30, 2025	19th	NPC	Re-elected in 2022.	2016–present Alcantara, Alegria, Badian, Dumanjug, Ginatilan, Malabuyoc, Moalboal, Ronda
14		Patricia Calderon	June 30, 2025	Incumbent	20th	NPC (1CEBU)	Elected in 2025.	2016–present Alcantara, Alegria, Badian, Dumanjug, Ginatilan, Malabuyoc, Moalboal, Ronda

== Election results ==
=== 2025 ===
Candidate	Party	Votes	%
Patricia Calderon	Nationalist People's Coalition	74,936	59.71
Maria Fema Duterte	Partido Demokratiko Pilipino	43,725	34.84
Lito Navarro	Independent	6,829	5.44
Total		125,490	100.00
Valid votes		125,490	84.17
Invalid/blank votes		23,603	15.83
Total votes		149,093	100.00
Registered voters/turnout		168,055	88.72
Nationalist People's Coalition hold			
Source: Commission on Elections

=== 2022 ===
Candidate	Party	Votes	%
Peter John Calderon (incumbent)	Nationalist People's Coalition	94,715	100.00
Total		94,715	100.00
Total votes		144,832	–
Registered voters/turnout		163,095	88.80
Nationalist People's Coalition hold			
Source: Commission on Elections

=== 2019 ===
2019 Philippine House of Representatives elections
Party	Candidate	Votes	%
NPC	Peter John D. Calderon	71,123	66.30
PDP–Laban	Nelson Gamaliel Garcia	36,147	33.69
Total votes		107,270	100.00

=== 2016 ===
2016 Philippine House of Representatives elections
Party	Candidate	Votes	%
Liberal	Peter John Calderon	57,798	57.14
1CEBU	Pablo John Garcia	43,347	42.86
Total votes		101,145	100.00

== See also ==
- Legislative districts of Cebu
