= Legislative districts of Cebu =

Legislative district of the Philippines

The legislative districts of Cebu are the representations of the province of Cebu in the various national legislatures of the Philippines. At present, the province is represented in the House of Representatives by its seven congressional districts, with their respective representatives being elected every three years. Locally, the districts are also allotted two seats in the Cebu Provincial Board, with board members also being elected every three years.

Legislative districts of Cebu

== History ==
Cebu was initially composed of one representative district, wherein it elected four representatives, at large, to the Malolos Congress in 1898. It was later divided into seven representative districts in 1907. When seats for the upper house of the Philippine Legislature were elected from territory-based districts between 1916 and 1935, the province formed part of the tenth senatorial district which elected two out of the 24-member senate.

In the disruption caused by the Second World War, two delegates represented the province in the National Assembly of the Japanese-sponsored Second Philippine Republic: one was the provincial governor (an ex officio member), while the other was elected through a provincial assembly of KALIBAPI members during the Japanese occupation of the Philippines. Cebu City, being a chartered city, was represented separately in this short-lived legislative body. Upon the restoration of the Philippine Commonwealth in 1945, the province retained its seven pre-war representative districts; this remained so until 1972.

The province was represented in the Interim Batasang Pambansa as part of Region VII from 1978 to 1984. Beginning in 1984 the province elected six representatives, at large, to the Regular Batasang Pambansa; Cebu City, which became a highly urbanized city in 1979 by virtue of Batas Pambansa Blg. 51, began to be represented separately from Cebu at this time.

Cebu, including the cities of Mandaue and Lapu-Lapu, was reapportioned into six congressional districts under the new Constitution which was proclaimed on February 11, 1987. The six districts elected members to the restored House of Representatives starting that same year.

The passage of Republic Act No. 9726 on October 22, 2009, separated the highly urbanized city of Lapu-Lapu from the sixth district to form its own congressional district starting in the 2010 elections.

Republic Act No. 10684, approved on September 18, 2015, split the second district and recreated the seventh district which elected its own representative in the 2016 elections.

Republic Act No. 11257, approved on April 15, 2019, separated the highly urbanized city of Mandaue from the sixth district to form its own congressional district starting in the 2022 elections.

== Current districts ==
The province was last redistricted in 2019, where Mandaue was separated from the sixth district to form its own congressional district. The province's current congressional delegation composes of four members of the National Unity Party, one member of Lakas–CMD, one member of the Nationalist People's Coalition, and one member of One Cebu. All seven representatives are part of the majority bloc in the 20th Congress.

Legislative districts and representatives of Cebu
District	Current Representative			Constituent LGUs	Population (2020)	Area	Map
District	Image	Name	Party	Constituent LGUs	Population (2020)	Area	Map
1st		Rhea Mae Gullas (since 2022); City of Talisay	NUP	List: Carcar; Naga; Talisay; Minglanilla; San Fernando; Sibonga	809,335	527.06 km²	
2nd		Edsel Galeos (since 2022); Argao	Lakas	List: Alcoy; Argao; Boljoon; Dalaguete; Oslob; Samboan; Santander	257,658	740.67 km²	
3rd		Karen Garcia (since 2025); City of Toledo	NUP	List: Toledo; Aloguinsan; Asturias; Balamban; Barili; Pinamungajan; Tuburan	616,326	1,258.08 km²	
4th		Sun Shimura (since 2025); Daanbantayan	NUP	List: Bogo; Bantayan; Daanbantayan; Madridejos; Medellin; San Remigio; Santa Fe; Tabogon; Tabuelan	540,814	740.41 km²	
5th		Vincent Franco Frasco (since 2019); Liloan	1CEBU	List: Danao; Borbon; Carmen; Catmon; Compostela; Liloan; Pilar; Poro; San Francisco; Sogod; Tudela	643,946	877.67 km²	
6th		Daphne Lagon (since 2022); Cordova	NUP	List: Consolacion; Cordova	218,607	89.05 km²	
7th		Patricia Calderon (since 2025); Dumanjug	NPC	List: Alcantara; Alegria; Badian; Dumanjug; Ginatilan; Malabuyoc; Moalboal; Ronda	238,699	641.62 km²	

== Historical districts ==
=== At-Large (defunct) ===
==== 1898–1899 ====
Period	Representatives
Malolos Congress; 1898–1899	Ariston Bautista
Malolos Congress; 1898–1899	Trinidad Pardo de Tavera
Malolos Congress; 1898–1899	Felix David
Malolos Congress; 1898–1899	Francisco Macabulos

==== 1943–1944 ====
- Excludes Cebu City

Period	Representative
National Assembly; 1943–1944	Jose S. Leyson
National Assembly; 1943–1944	Jose Delgado (ex officio)

==== 1984–1986 ====
- Excludes Cebu City

Period	Representative
Regular Batasang Pambansa; 1984–1986	Emerito S. Calderon
Regular Batasang Pambansa; 1984–1986	Nenita C. Daluz
Regular Batasang Pambansa; 1984–1986	Ramon D. Durano III
Regular Batasang Pambansa; 1984–1986	Regalado Estrella Maambong
Regular Batasang Pambansa; 1984–1986	Luisito R. Patalinjug
Regular Batasang Pambansa; 1984–1986	Adelino B. Sitoy

== See also ==
- Legislative districts of Cebu City
- Legislative district of Lapu-Lapu
- Legislative district of Mandaue
