= Tomás N. Alonso =

Cebuano writer and politician

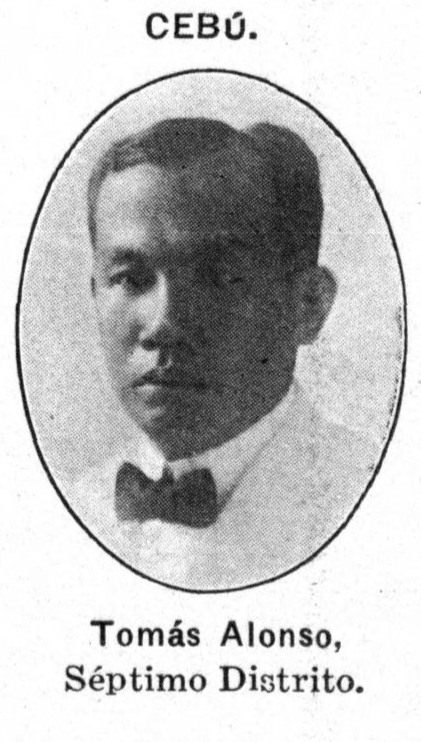
- Alonso in 1917

Member of the House of Representatives from Cebu
- In office June 5, 1928 – June 2, 1931
- Preceded by: Mariano Jesús Cuenco
- Succeeded by: Miguel Cuenco
- Constituency: 5th district
- In office November 21, 1914 – June 3, 1919
- Preceded by: Eulalio E. Causing
- Succeeded by: José Alonso
- Constituency: 7th district

Personal details
- Born: December 29, 1881 Asturias, Cebu, Captaincy General of the Philippines
- Died: June 16, 1962 (aged 80) Mandaue, Cebu, Philippines
- Party: Nacionalista

Tomás Noel Alonso (December 29, 1881 – June 16, 1962) is a well-known Cebuano Visayan writer and politician. He published the first complete Cebuano translation of Jose Rizal's El filibusterismo. He also translated the Mi último adiós. He was a columnist with Bag-ong Suga and editor of the Spanish publication La opinión.

== Biography ==
Tomas Alonso was born in Asturias, Cebu in December 29, 1881. In his early life, he got his primary and secondary education at Colegio Seminario de San Carlos in Cebu. During the Philippine-American War, he served as a soldier under General Juan Climaco. He later studied in Manila to pursue a career in law after the war ended. He received his law degree in March 1907.

In Cebu, Alonso was elected member of the Provincial Board from 1908 to 1909. He was elected Deputy for the Seventh District of Cebu in 1914 and was elected again in 1916 obtaining a majority vote of 1,419 votes against Ramon Villaceran, which obtained 983 votes.

As a writer, Alonso was known by his pseudonym "No Oma" and successfully translated the works of José Rizal's El filibusterismo and Mi Ultimo Adios into Cebuano.

During World War II, he was arrested by the Japanese military forces. He was released in 1945 as the war ended.
