= Peter John Calderon =

Filipino politician (born 1961)

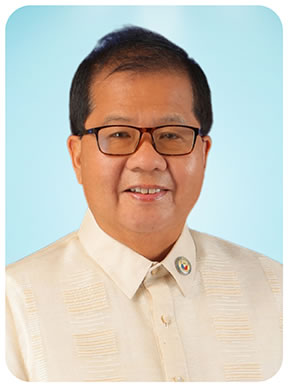
- Official portrait, 2022

Member of the Philippine House of Representatives from Cebu's 7th district
- In office June 30, 2016 – June 30, 2025
- Preceded by: Position established
- Succeeded by: Patricia Calderon

Member of the Cebu Provincial Board from Cebu's 2nd district
- In office June 30, 2007 – June 30, 2016

Mayor of Samboan
- In office June 30, 2001 – June 30, 2007
- Preceded by: Crisologo A. Abines
- Succeeded by: Raymond Joseph D. Calderon

Personal details
- Born: Peter John Durano Calderon; March 27, 1961 (age 65) Samboan, Cebu
- Party: NPC
- Education: University of the Philippines Diliman (B.S.) (LL.B.); University of the Philippines Cebu (MBA)
- Profession: Lawyer; Politician

Peter John Durano Calderon (born March 27, 1961) is a Filipino politician and lawyer who served as the representative for the 7th district of Cebu from 2016 to 2025. He served as mayor of Samboan, Cebu from 2001 to 2007 and as member of the Cebu Provincial Board representing the 2nd district from 2007 to 2016.

== Education ==
Calderon earned his bachelor's degree in business economics and in laws at University of the Philippines Diliman. He then took up his master's in business management in University of the Philippines Cebu.

He placed 11th in the 1988 Philippine Bar Examination. He went on to complete the Program of Instructions for Lawyers at Harvard Law School in Massachusetts, United States in 1997.

== Political career ==
=== Mayor of Samboan (2001–2007) ===
Calderon started his political career by serving as mayor of Samboan for two consecutive terms from 2001 to 2007.

=== Cebu Provincial Board (2007–2016) ===
Calderon ran for board member of Cebu's 2nd district in the 2007 elections and went on to be re-elected for three consecutive terms serving until 2016.

=== House of Representatives (2016–present) ===
Calderon ran for representative of Cebu's 7th district in the 2016 elections. The said district was re-created by virtue of Republic Act 10684 comprising the municipalities of Alcantara, Alegria, Badian, Dumanjug, Ginatilan, Malabuyoc, Moalboal, and Ronda. He defeated Pablo John Garcia, who previously ran against then-Governor Hilario Davide III in the 2013 elections.

He ran for re-election in the 2019 elections and won against then-Dumanjug mayor Nelson Garcia.

He is currently serving as the Vice Chairperson of the Committee on Appropriations.

== Electoral history ==
=== House of Representatives ===
2016 Philippine House of Representatives election in Cebu's 7th District
Party	Candidate	Votes	%
Liberal	Peter John Calderon	57,798	57.1
1CEBU	Pablo John Garcia	43,347	42.9
Total votes		101,145	100.00

2019 Philippine House of Representatives election in Cebu's 7th District
Party	Candidate	Votes	%
NPC	Peter John Calderon	71,123	66.30
PDP–Laban	Nelson Gamaliel Garcia	36,147	33.69
Total votes		107,270	100.00
