= Patricia Calderon =

Filipino physician and politician

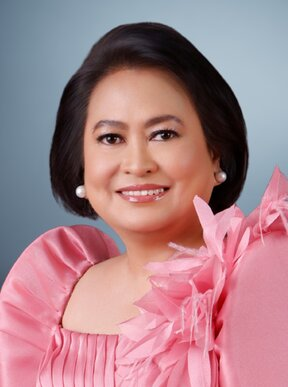
- Official portrait, 2025

Member of the House of Representatives of the Philippines of the Cebu's 7th congressional district
- Incumbent
- Assumed office June 30, 2025
- Preceded by: Peter John Calderon

Personal details
- Born: Patricia Cinco Calderon; September 12, 1963 (age 62)
- Party: NPC (2024–present); 1CEBU (2024–present)
- Occupation: Politician
- Profession: Medical doctor

Patricia "Patsy" Cinco Calderon (born September 12, 1963) is a Filipino physician and politician. She is the representative of Cebu's 7th congressional district in the House of Representatives of the Philippines since 2025.

== Early life and education ==
Calderon was born on September 12, 1963. She pursued a career in medicine and became a practicing physician before entering politics.

== Political career ==
Calderon made her debut in politics by participating in the 2025 election. She ran for congresswoman of Cebu's 7th district under the banner of the One Cebu party which is associated with the former Cebu governor Gwen Garcia. She won the seat, succeeding her husband, Peter John Calderon.

Calderon later became part of the R7 Bloc, a local political alliance in Cebu.
