= Legislative districts of Lapu-Lapu City =

Legislative district of the Philippines

The legislative districts of Lapu-Lapu are the representations of the highly urbanized city of Lapu-Lapu in the Congress of the Philippines. The city is currently represented in the lower house of the Congress through its lone congressional district.

== History ==
The present-day city of Lapu-Lapu initially formed part of the at-large district of Cebu from 1898 to 1899. It later formed part of second district of Cebu for the Philippine Assembly in 1907. When seats for the upper house of the Philippine Legislature were elected from territory-based districts between 1916 and 1935, the then-municipality of Opon formed part of the tenth senatorial district which elected two out of the 24-member senate.

In the disruption caused by the Second World War, two delegates represented the province of Cebu (of which the municipality of Opon was a part) in the National Assembly of the Japanese-sponsored Second Philippine Republic: one was the provincial governor (an ex officio member), while the other was elected through a provincial assembly of KALIBAPI members during the Japanese occupation of the Philippines. Upon the restoration of the Philippine Commonwealth in 1945, the province's seven-district configuration was restored. The Municipality of Opon, converted into the city of Lapu-Lapu in 1961, remained a part of Cebu's second district until 1972.

Lapu-Lapu was represented in the Interim Batasang Pambansa as part of Region VII from 1978 to 1984. The city, along with the rest of Cebu province (except Cebu City), elected six representatives, at large, to the Regular Batasang Pambansa in the 1984 elections. When the province was reapportioned into six congressional districts under the new Constitution which was proclaimed on February 11, 1987, Lapu-Lapu formed part of the province's sixth district.

Two years after Lapu-Lapu was converted into a highly urbanized city in 2007, it was also granted separate congressional representation by virtue of Republic Act No. 9726, approved on October 22, 2009. The law separated the city from Cebu's sixth district to form its own congressional district after the 2010 elections.

== Current districts ==
Legislative Districts and Congressional Representatives of Lapu-Lapu City
| District | Current Representative | Party | Barangays | Population (2020) | Area |
|---|---|---|---|---|---|
| Lone | Junard Chan (since 2025); Pajo | PFP | List: Agus; Babag; Bankal; Baring; Basak; Buaya; Calawisan; Canjulao; Caubian; Caw-oy; Cawhagan; Gun-ob; Ibo; Looc; Mactan; Maribago; Marigondon; Pajac; Pajo; Pangan-an; Poblacion; Punta Engaño; Pusok; Sabang; San Vicente; Santa Rosa; Subabasbas; Talima; Tingo; Tungasan | 497,604 | 58.10 km^{2} |

== See also ==
- Legislative districts of Cebu
