= Ronda, Cebu =

Municipality in Cebu, Philippines

Ronda
- Municipality
- Municipality of Ronda
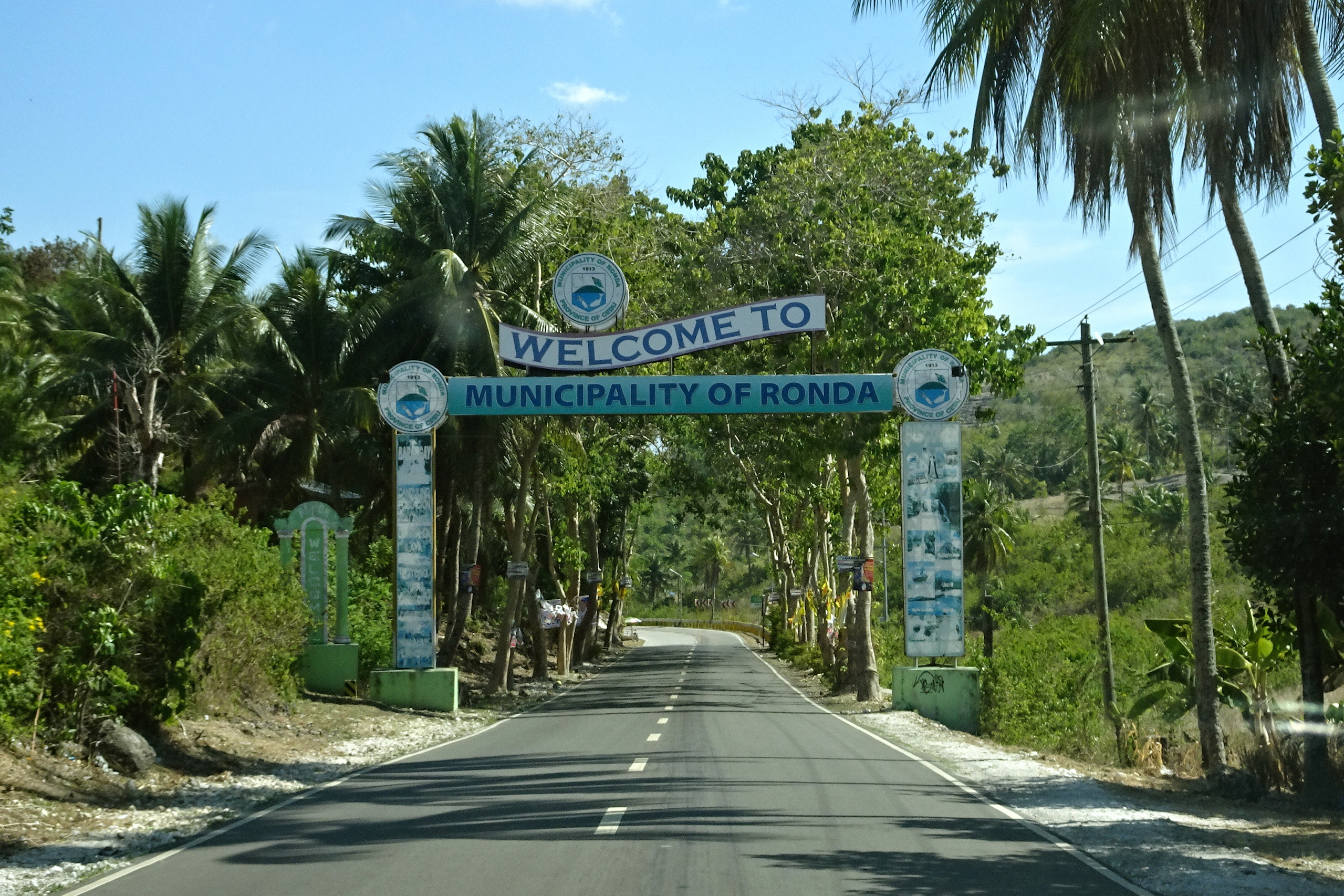
- Ronda, Cebu

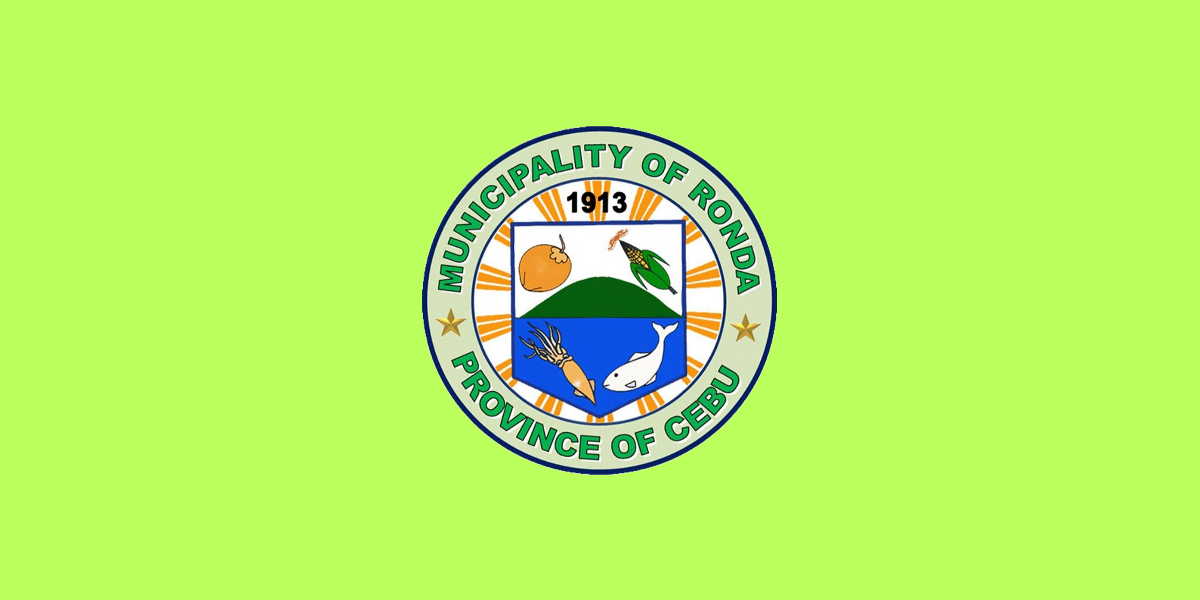
- Flag Seal

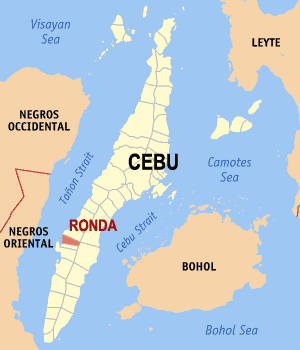
- Map of Cebu with Ronda highlighted
- Interactive map of Ronda
- Location within the Philippines
- Coordinates: 10°00′01″N 123°24′34″E
- Country: Philippines
- Region: Central Visayas
- Province: Cebu
- District: 7th district
- Founded: 1913
- Barangays: 14 (see Barangays)

Government
  - Type: Sangguniang Bayan
  - Mayor: Terence Mariano Y. Blanco
  - Vice Mayor: Rocky T. Gabatan
  - Representative: Peter John D. Calderon
  - Municipal Council: Members: Ann Marie M. Blanco; Miguelito P. Lazarraga; Joxannah Mae G. Villanueva; Jose A. Zozobrado; Alfred M. Ricahuerta; Helenida I. Georpe; Agustin J. Bacotot; Eugenio B. Layaguin
  - Electorate: 15,920 voters (2025)

Area
  - Total: 57.10 km^{2} (22.05 sq mi)
- Elevation: 46 m (151 ft)
- Highest elevation: 275 m (902 ft)
- Lowest elevation: 0 m (0 ft)

Population (2024 census)
  - Total: 21,179
  - Density: 370.9/km^{2} (960.7/sq mi)
  - Households: 5,450

Economy
  - Income class: 4th municipal income class
  - Poverty incidence: 21.26% (2023)
  - Revenue: ₱ 137.7 million (2024)
  - Assets: ₱ 456.6 million (2024)
  - Expenditure: ₱ 57.45 million (2024)
  - Liabilities: ₱ 103.4 million (2024)

Service provider
  - Electricity: Cebu 1 Electric Cooperative (CEBECO 1)
- Time zone: UTC+8 (PST)
- ZIP code: 6034
- PSGC: 0702239000
- IDD : area code: +63 (0)32
- Native languages: Cebuano; Tagalog

Ronda, officially the Municipality of Ronda (Cebuano: Lungsod sa Ronda; Tagalog: Bayan ng Ronda), is a municipality in the province of Cebu, Philippines. According to the 2024 census, it has a population of 21,179 people.

== Etymology ==
Ronda (which is named after a town in Malaga) is usually attributed to the Spanish word ”ronda” which means ”to round” or ”to patrol” but evidence suggests Ronda is derived from Arunda, presumably of Celtic origin however its meaning is uncertain.

Oral traditions suggest that the town was named “Holoyaw” before the Spanish conquest. ‘’Holoyaw’’ refers to a type of banana that was abundant in the area. Others posit the name’s origin to Jolo as the southern parts of the Visayas was infamous to being vulnerable to raids by Muslim pirates. However, Jolo is just a recent orthographic innovation from earlier “Xoló”, with the “x” being pronounced as /ʃ/ (the sh in English ship).

== Geography ==
Ronda is bordered to the north by the town of Dumanjug, to the west is the Tañon Strait, to the east is the town of Argao, and to the south is the town of Alcantara. It is 91 kilometres (57 mi) from Cebu City and 43 kilometres (27 mi) from Argao.

Ronda is one of the eight municipalities comprising the 7th Congressional District Cebu Province.

=== Barangays ===
Ronda is politically subdivided into 14 barangays. Each barangay consists of puroks and some have sitios.

PSGC	Barangay	Population			±% p.a.	
		2024		2010		
072239001	Butong	7.6%	1,617	1,610	▴	0.03%
072239002	Can‑abuhon	4.4%	930	780	▴	1.23%
072239003	Canduling	6.4%	1,353	1,329	▴	0.12%
072239004	Cansalonoy	4.0%	846	709	▴	1.23%
072239005	Cansayahon	9.2%	1,947	1,799	▴	0.55%
072239006	Ilaya	7.7%	1,630	1,455	▴	0.79%
072239007	Langin	6.0%	1,262	1,251	▴	0.06%
072239008	Libo‑o	5.7%	1,198	931	▴	1.77%
072239009	Malalay	5.5%	1,165	974	▴	1.25%
072239010	Palanas	8.2%	1,739	1,504	▴	1.01%
072239011	Poblacion	9.4%	1,992	1,990	▴	0.01%
072239012	Santa Cruz	15.2%	3,224	2,768	▴	1.06%
072239013	Tupas	2.8%	592	711	▾	−1.26%
072239014	Vive	4.1%	865	771	▴	0.80%
	Total		21,179	18,582	▴	0.91%

=== Climate ===
Climate data for Ronda, Cebu
Month	Jan	Feb	Mar	Apr	May	Jun	Jul	Aug	Sep	Oct	Nov	Dec	Year
Mean daily maximum °C (°F)	29 (84)	30 (86)	31 (88)	32 (90)	32 (90)	30 (86)	30 (86)	30 (86)	30 (86)	29 (84)	29 (84)	29 (84)	30 (86)
Mean daily minimum °C (°F)	23 (73)	22 (72)	23 (73)	24 (75)	25 (77)	25 (77)	24 (75)	24 (75)	24 (75)	24 (75)	24 (75)	23 (73)	24 (75)
Average precipitation mm (inches)	42 (1.7)	34 (1.3)	40 (1.6)	61 (2.4)	124 (4.9)	188 (7.4)	190 (7.5)	191 (7.5)	189 (7.4)	186 (7.3)	124 (4.9)	73 (2.9)	1,442 (56.8)
Average rainy days	10.0	8.5	9.5	12.8	22.3	26.8	28.4	27.9	27.3	27.6	20.5	13.1	234.7
Source: Meteoblue

== Demographics ==
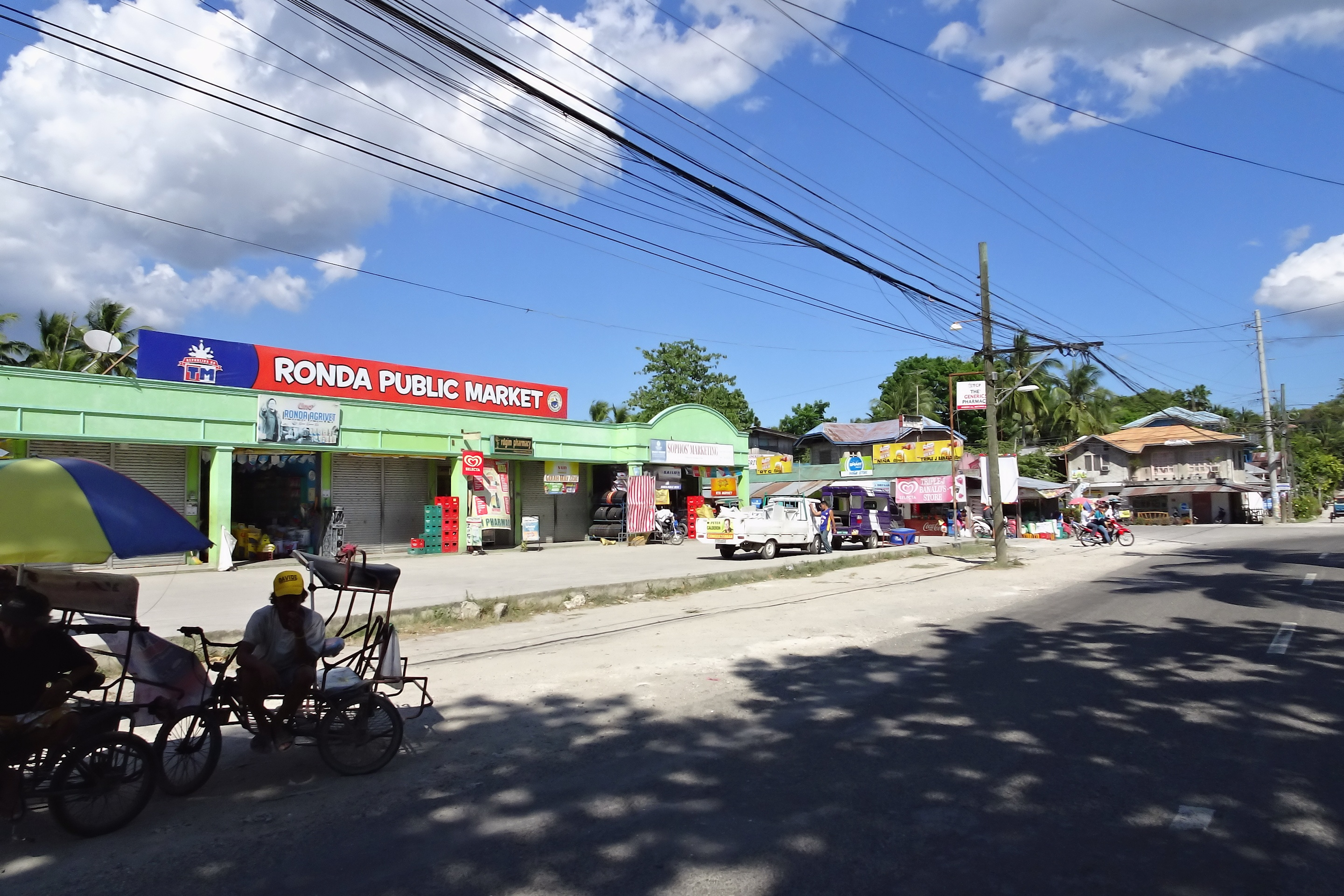
Poblacion

Population census of Ronda
Year	Pop.	±% p.a.
1903	9,662	—
1918	11,192	+0.98%
1939	11,936	+0.31%
1948	11,563	−0.35%
1960	10,565	−0.75%
1970	11,535	+0.88%
1975	12,006	+0.81%
1980	12,939	+1.51%
1990	15,264	+1.67%
1995	16,561	+1.54%
2000	16,808	+0.32%
2007	17,214	+0.33%
2010	18,582	+2.82%
2015	20,360	+1.76%
2020	21,005	+0.66%
2024	21,179	+0.20%
Source: Philippine Statistics Authority

== Economy ==
Poverty incidence of Ronda (%)

Source: Philippine Statistics Authority

== Education ==
The public schools in the town of Ronda are administered by one school district under the Schools Division of Cebu Province.

Elementary schools:

- Butong Elementary School — Butong
- Can-abujon Elementary School — Can-abujon
- Cansalonoy Elementary School — Cansalonoy
- Cansayahon Elementary School — Cansayahon
- Langin Elementary School — Langin
- Liboo Elementary School — Libo-o
- Madanglog Elementary School — Vive
- Ronda Central Elementary School — Palanas
- Sta. Cruz Elementary School — Sta. Cruz
- Tupas Elementary School — Libo-o

High schools:

- Langin National High School — Vive
- Ronda National High School — Palanas

Private schools:

- Academia de Nuestra Señora, Inc. — J.P. Rizal Street, Poblacion
