= Dumanjug =

Municipality in Cebu, Philippines

- Municipality
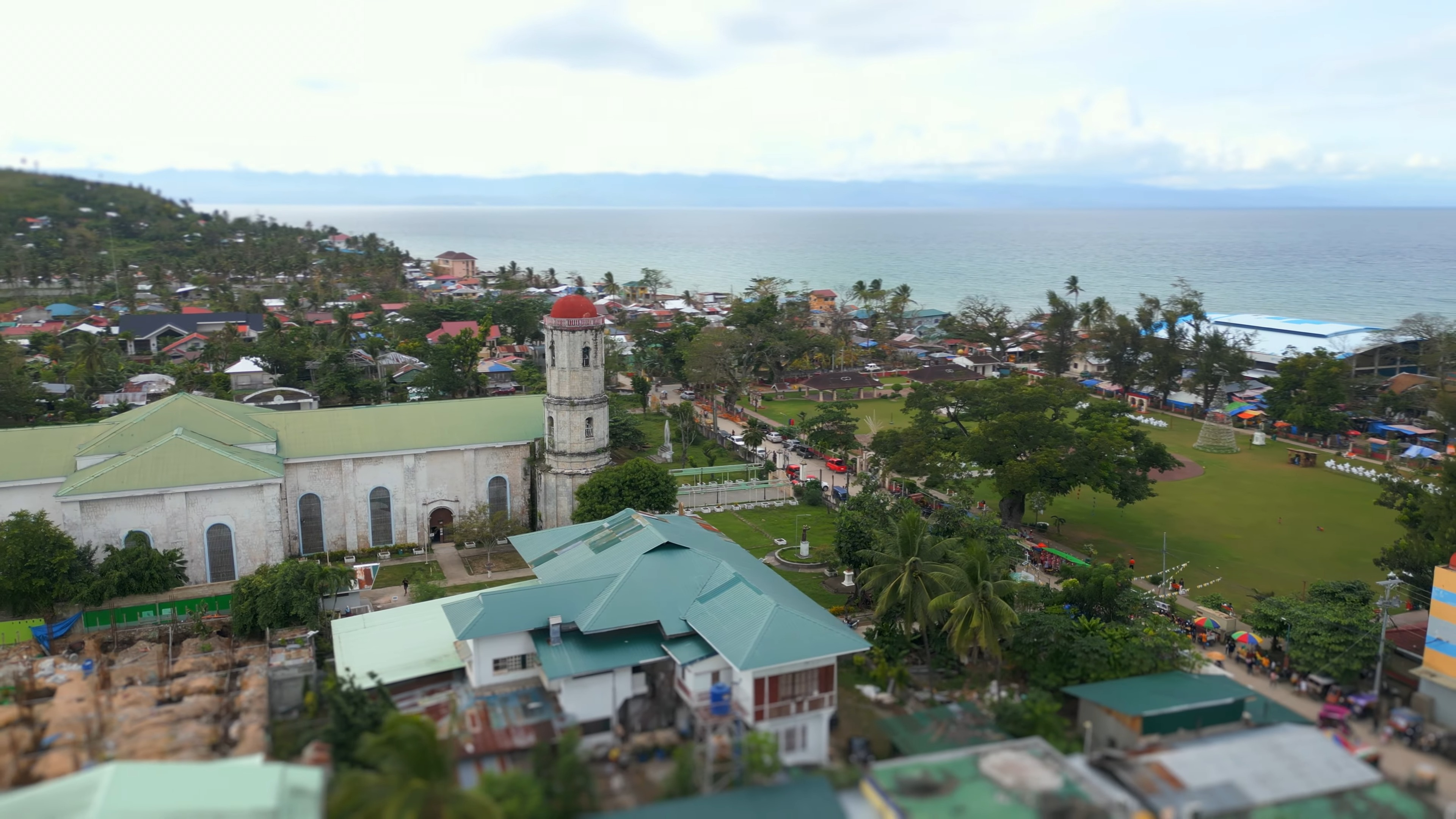
- Dumanjug skyline
- Nickname: Home of the Governors
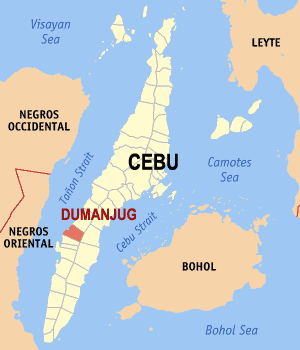
- Map of Cebu with Dumanjug highlighted
- Interactive map of Dumanjug
- Location within the Philippines
- Coordinates: 10°03′N 123°29′E
- Country: Philippines
- Region: Central Visayas
- Province: Cebu
- District: 7th district
- Founded: 1855
- Barangays: 37 (see Barangays)

Government
  - Type: Sangguniang Bayan
  - Mayor: Efren Guntrano Z. Gica
  - Vice Mayor: Erwin Z. Gica
  - Representative: Peter John D. Calderon
  - Municipal Council: Members: Francis Arthur L. Famor; Rainero G. Asentista; Miguela Luage-Yu Chong; Rodrigo C. Pan; Stanley P. Aldemita; Evelinda T. Quirante; Isaac S. Cambalon; Julius Cesar A. Lañojan Jr.
  - Electorate: 39,876 voters (2025)

Area
  - Total: 85.53 km^{2} (33.02 sq mi)
- Elevation: 35 m (115 ft)
- Highest elevation: 212 m (696 ft)
- Lowest elevation: 0 m (0 ft)

Population (2024 census)
  - Total: 59,954
  - Density: 701.0/km^{2} (1,816/sq mi)
  - Households: 12,968

Economy
  - Income class: 1st municipal income class
  - Poverty incidence: 30.06% (2023)
  - Revenue: ₱ 378.5 million (2024)
  - Assets: ₱ 1,342 million (2024)
  - Expenditure: ₱ 203.3 million (2024)
  - Liabilities: ₱ 546.7 million (2024)

Service provider
  - Electricity: Cebu 1 Electric Cooperative (CEBECO 1)
- Time zone: UTC+8 (PST)
- ZIP code: 6035
- PSGC: 072224000
- IDD : area code: +63 (0)32
- Native languages: Cebuano; Tagalog
- Website: www.dumanjug.gov.ph

Dumanjug, officially the Municipality of Dumanjug (Cebuano: Lungsod sa Dumanjug; Tagalog: Bayan ng Dumanjug), is a municipality in the province of Cebu, Philippines. According to the 2024 census, it has a population of 59,954 people.

Dumanjug is also known as "The Land of Golden Friendship".

== Geography ==
Dumanjug is bordered to the north by Barili, to the west is the Tañon Strait, to the east is Sibonga, and to the south is Ronda. It is 128 kilometres (80 mi) from Cebu City and 33 kilometres (21 mi) from Sibonga.

Dumanjug is one of the eight municipalities comprising the 7th Congressional District Cebu Province.

It was established in 1855. Based on the cadastral survey map of the Department of Environment and Natural Resources (DENR), Dumanjug has an effective land area of 8,544 hectares (21,110 acres)

=== Barangays ===
Dumanjug is politically subdivided into 37 barangays. Each barangay consists of puroks and some have sitios.

Barangay Bitoon, Calaboon, Camboang, Kanyuko, Li-ong, Poblacion, Tapon and Tangil which classified as coastal barangays.

PSGC	Barangay	Population			±% p.a.	
		2024		2010		
072224001	Balaygtiki	3.4%	2,016	1,834	▴	0.66%
072224002	Bitoon	5.0%	2,979	2,260	▴	1.94%
072224003	Bulak	2.4%	1,441	1,419	▴	0.11%
072224004	Bullogan	1.8%	1,065	886	▴	1.29%
072224009	Calaboon	3.2%	1,920	1,867	▴	0.19%
072224011	Camboang	2.0%	1,194	1,123	▴	0.43%
072224012	Candabong	1.6%	982	936	▴	0.33%
072224019	Cogon	5.1%	3,051	2,768	▴	0.68%
072224021	Cotcoton	0.9%	549	457	▴	1.28%
072224006	Doldol	2.6%	1,564	1,451	▴	0.52%
072224031	Ilaya (Poblacion)	2.0%	1,217	1,103	▴	0.69%
072224007	Kabalaasnan	0.6%	385	350	▴	0.66%
072224008	Kabatbatan	0.6%	385	320	▴	1.29%
072224010	Kambanog	0.7%	438	450	▾	−0.19%
072224013	Kang‑actol	2.1%	1,274	1,027	▴	1.51%
072224014	Kanghalo	0.9%	559	500	▴	0.78%
072224015	Kanghumaod	2.7%	1,642	1,579	▴	0.27%
072224016	Kanguha	1.3%	765	700	▴	0.62%
072224017	Kantangkas	1.4%	839	710	▴	1.17%
072224018	Kanyuko	1.8%	1,088	1,074	▴	0.09%
072224020	Kolabtingon	1.2%	740	630	▴	1.12%
072224022	Lamak	1.0%	570	554	▴	0.20%
072224023	Lawaan	3.9%	2,321	2,173	▴	0.46%
072224024	Liong	3.6%	2,159	1,746	▴	1.49%
072224025	Manlapay	2.2%	1,307	1,675	▾	−1.71%
072224026	Masa	1.0%	618	528	▴	1.10%
072224027	Matalao	0.6%	341	307	▴	0.73%
072224028	Paculob	2.6%	1,576	1,582	▾	−0.03%
072224029	Panlaan	3.7%	2,190	1,857	▴	1.15%
072224030	Pawa	2.0%	1,226	972	▴	1.63%
072224039	Poblacion Central	1.6%	938	809	▴	1.03%
072224032	Poblacion Looc	2.0%	1,198	1,174	▴	0.14%
072224033	Poblacion Sima	1.0%	588	503	▴	1.09%
072224034	Tangil	4.8%	2,886	2,673	▴	0.53%
072224035	Tapon	5.8%	3,499	3,327	▴	0.35%
072224037	Tubod-Bitoon	3.6%	2,129	1,905	▴	0.78%
072224038	Tubod-Dugoan	2.6%	1,571	1,455	▴	0.53%
	Total		59,954	46,754	▴	1.74%

=== Climate ===
Climate data for Dumanjug, Cebu
Month	Jan	Feb	Mar	Apr	May	Jun	Jul	Aug	Sep	Oct	Nov	Dec	Year
Mean daily maximum °C (°F)	29 (84)	30 (86)	31 (88)	32 (90)	31 (88)	30 (86)	30 (86)	30 (86)	30 (86)	29 (84)	29 (84)	29 (84)	30 (86)
Mean daily minimum °C (°F)	22 (72)	22 (72)	23 (73)	24 (75)	25 (77)	25 (77)	24 (75)	24 (75)	24 (75)	24 (75)	24 (75)	23 (73)	24 (75)
Average precipitation mm (inches)	42 (1.7)	34 (1.3)	40 (1.6)	61 (2.4)	124 (4.9)	188 (7.4)	190 (7.5)	191 (7.5)	189 (7.4)	186 (7.3)	124 (4.9)	73 (2.9)	1,442 (56.8)
Average rainy days	10.0	8.5	9.5	12.8	22.3	26.8	28.4	27.9	27.3	27.6	20.5	13.1	234.7
Source: Meteoblue

== Demographics ==
Population census of Dumanjug
Year	Pop.	±% p.a.
1903	22,203	—
1918	23,678	+0.43%
1939	20,973	−0.58%
1948	19,630	−0.73%
1960	20,393	+0.32%
1970	21,955	+0.74%
1975	22,942	+0.89%
1980	25,258	+1.94%
1990	31,932	+2.37%
1995	35,279	+1.89%
2000	39,666	+2.54%
2007	44,807	+1.70%
2010	46,754	+1.56%
2015	51,210	+1.75%
2020	57,823	+2.59%
2024	59,954	+0.87%
Source: Philippine Statistics Authority

Dumanjug's population is characterized mainly by an increasing birth rate and a gradually declining mortality rate. The growth in population is thus attributed to higher rate of birth than of death.

The bulk of the household population is concentrated in the coastal barangays located in the western part of the municipality. The urban area comprising Poblacion, Sima, Ilaya, and Looc has the biggest slice of the population. Barangays Bitoon, Tangil, Tapon, Balaygtiki, Cogon and Liong are catching up with the urban barangays in terms of household population. With the urban area fast becoming a commercial hub, Bitoon, Paculob, Cogon and Liong are foreseen as upcoming dormitory communities.

Dumanjuganons speak Cebuano, the official language spoken in Cebu. Cebuano is also spoken in most areas of the Visayas and in many provinces of Mindanao.

=== Religion ===
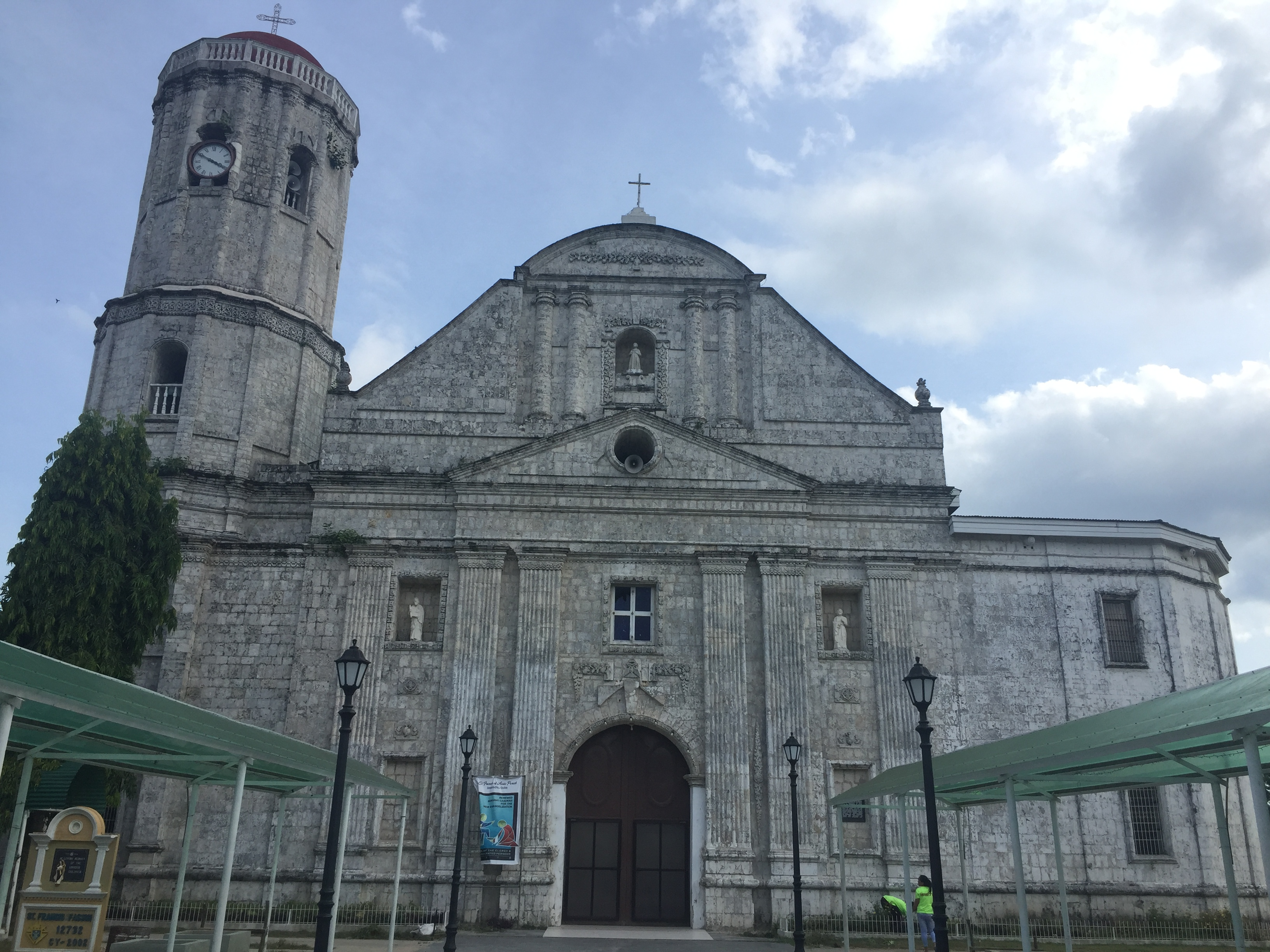
Dumanjug Church

The people of Dumanjug are mostly Catholics. The town has three Catholic parishes:

- St. Francis of Assisi church (Poblacion)
- St. Vincent Ferrer (Bitoon)
- Our Lady of the Holy Rosary (Bulak)

== Economy ==
Poverty incidence of Dumanjug (%)

Source: Philippine Statistics Authority

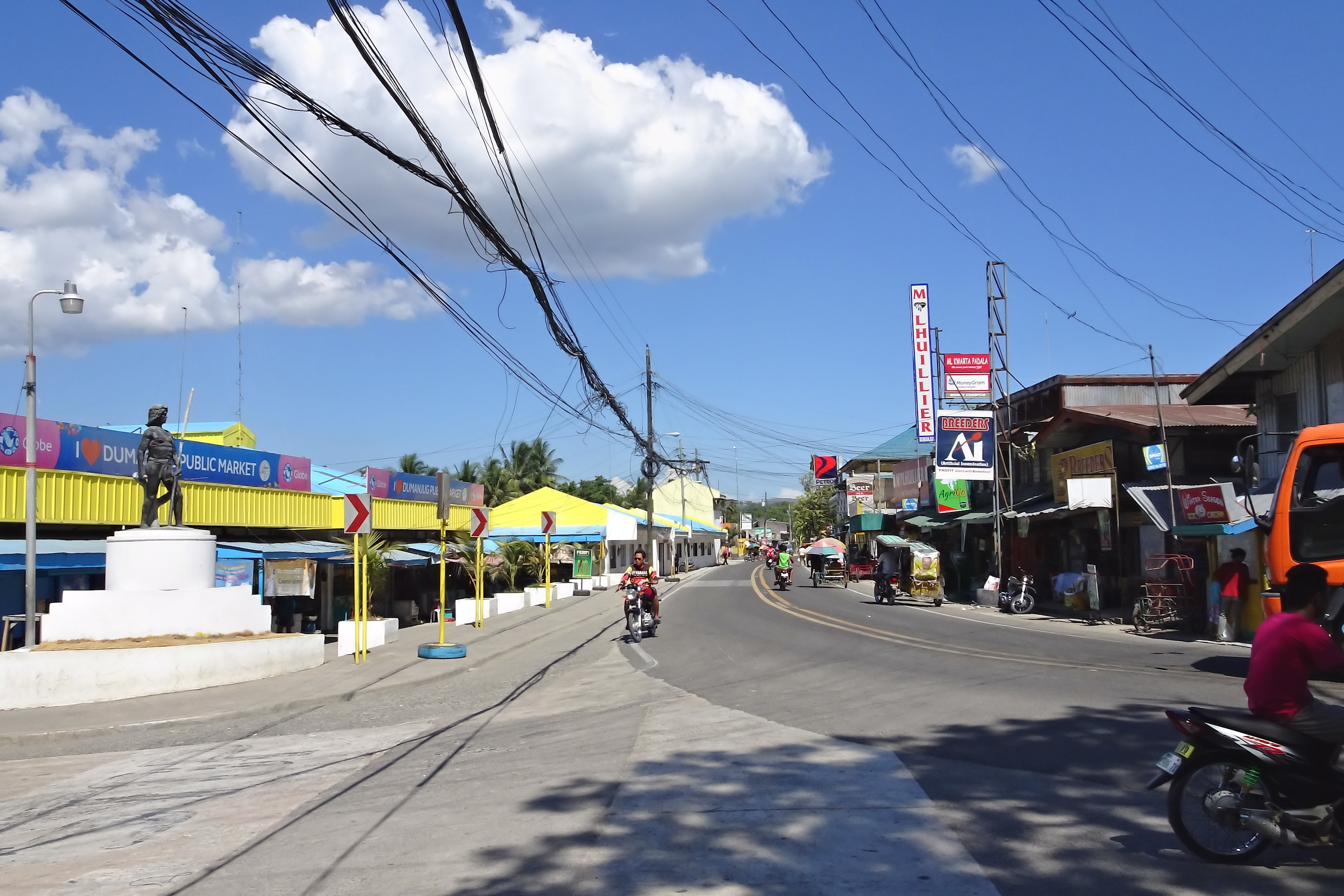
Town center

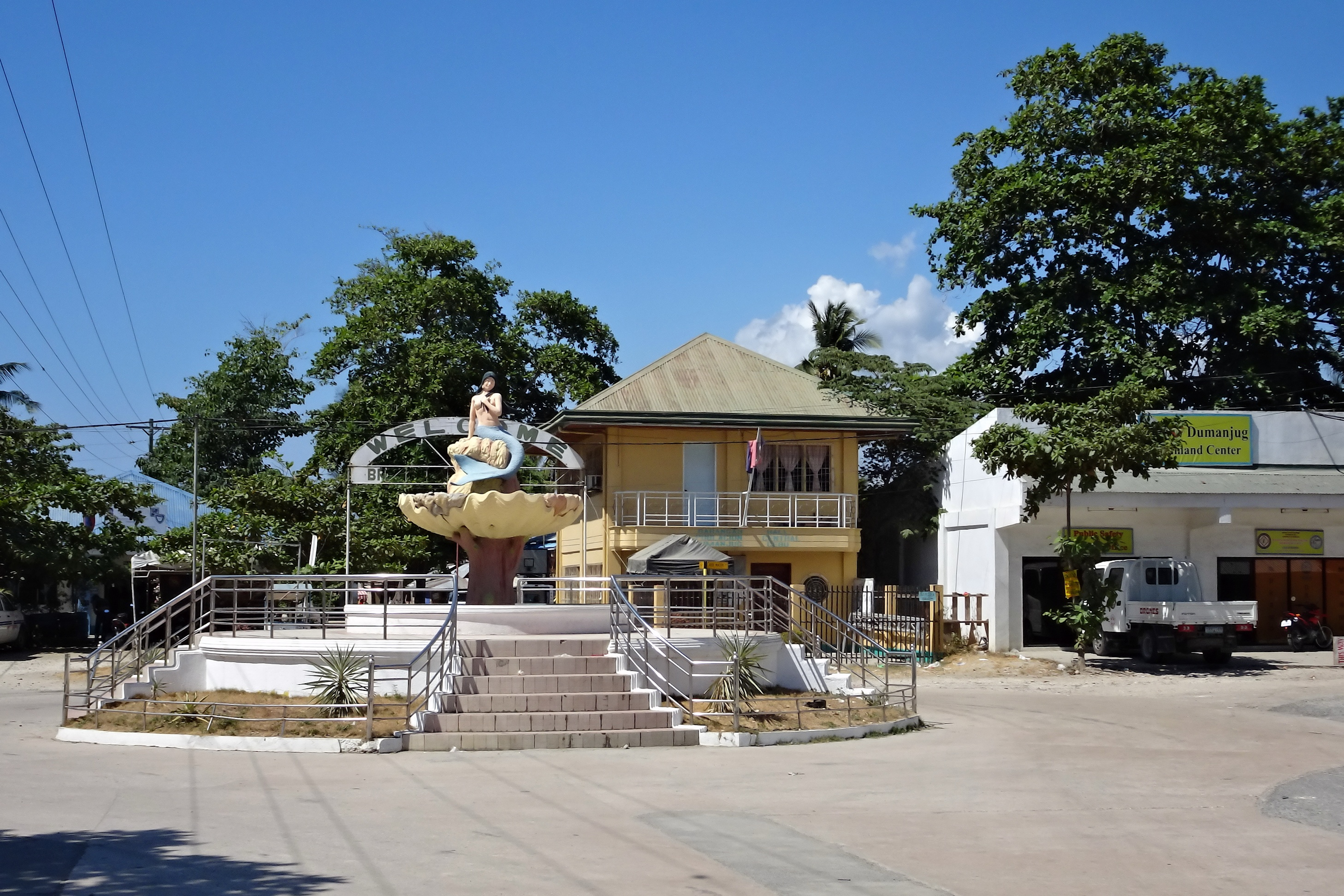
Poblacion Central

Majority of the existing industrial establishments in Dumanjug are those of micro-scale industries or establishments. These include bakeshops, welding shops, and cottage industries. Their products are mostly bakery products, assembled vehicles and handicrafts. Most of these establishments are found in the poblacion area and Bitoon. There are also four existing rice and corn mills operating in the municipality.

The municipality has considerable quantities of high-grade dolomites and large phosphate reserves found in Kanghumaod, Balaygtiki, Bullogan, Kabalaasnan, Matalao and Kabatbatan.

The Dumanjug Agora Complex is the center of trade & commerce of the municipality. Within the complex, various commercial establishments contribute greatly to the movement of goods and generation of revenues. These establishments cover basic goods for daily needs to construction supplies, agri-feeds, dry goods and many more. Sunday is designated as market day when various livestock and farm products congregate in the market. Out of town traders create an atmosphere of competition and creating opportunities for local consumers. Opposite the Agora complex is Gaisano Grand Mall, the first mall to be constructed in southwestern Cebu.

== Tourism ==
- Pityak / Tubod-Duguan Falls
- Windy Peak Campsite and Cotcoton Loranisa Farm
- SaDumanjugNi Ancestral House
- St. Francis de Assisi Parish Church - one of the oldest church in the Philippines
- Bisnok Festival
- Camboang Marine Sanctuary
- Cantarini Art Gallery
- Dona Josefa Paras Garcia Heritage Park
- Dionisio Jakosalem Plaza
- Falls of Lelo-an and rock formations
- Julian Macoy photo gallery
- Kota Kanwa Beach
- La Montera Beach Resort
- Monkey Watching at Brangay Kabala-asnan - natural habitat
- The Seaplane
- Tangil Wharf
- Nanay Inie Beach (Sitio Bangag, Tangil)

== Transportation ==
Dumanjug is currently served by eight bus operators

- Britt
- Ceres Bus Line
- Chan Transit
- Librando Trans
- Rough Riders

The municipality also has a RORO (Roll-On Roll Off) port situated in Tangil, which serves as the gateway between southern Cebu and mideastern Negros Island. There are two shipping companies effectively offering round-the-clock service.

== Education ==
Dumanjug has 30 schools offering basic education, six secondary schools, and two tertiary education institutions. One of the town's prominent schools, the Little Flower School, was established in 1946 as the Dumanjug branch of the Colegio de San Carlos (now University of San Carlos). It was later renamed as the Dumanjug Catholic High School. It is currently administered by the Oblates of Notre Dame. Dumanjug's biggest school, Bitoon National Vocational School, is in the northern barangay of Bitoon. A satellite campus of the Cebu Technological University is also located in the same barangay.

The public schools in the town of Dumanjug are administered by two school districts under the Schools Division of Cebu Province.

Elementary schools:

- Balaygtiki Elementary School — Balaygtiki
- Bitoon Central Elementary School — Bitoon
- Bulak Elementary School — Bulak
- Bullogan Elementary School — Bullogan
- Calaboon Elementary School — Calaboon
- Cambanog Elementary School — Cambanog
- Camboang Elementary School — Camboang
- Cogon Elementary School — Cogon
- Cotcoton Elementary School — Cotcoton
- Doldol Elementary School — Doldol
- Dumanjug Central School — Liong
- Kabalaasnan Elementary School — Kabalaasnan
- Kang-actol Elementary School — Kang-actol
- Kanghalo Elementary School — Kanghalo
- Kanghumaod Elementary School — Kanghumaod
- Kantangkas Elementary School — Kantangkas
- Kanyuko Elementary School — Kanyuko
- Lamak Elementary School — Lamak
- Lawaan Elementary School — Lawaan
- Manlapay Elementary School — Manlapay
- Masa Elementary School — Masa
- Matalao Elementary School — Matalao
- Paculob Elementary School — Paculob
- Panlaan Elementary School — Panlaan
- Pawa Elementary School — Pawa
- Tangil Elementary School — Tangil
- Tapon Elementary School — Tapon
- Tubod-Bitoon Elementary School — Tubod-Bitoon
- Tubod-Dugoan Elementary School — Tubod-Dugoan

High schools:

- Bitoon National Vocational High School — Bitoon
- Bulak National High School — Bulak
- Cogon National High School — Cogon
- Dumanjug National High School — Liong
- Hipolito Boquecosa Memorial National High School — Bullogan
- Tubod Dugoan National High School — Tubod-Dugoan

Private schools:

- Little Flower School, Inc. — Poblacion Central
