= Tuburan, Cebu =

Municipality in Cebu, Philippines

Tuburan
- Municipality
- Municipality of Tuburan
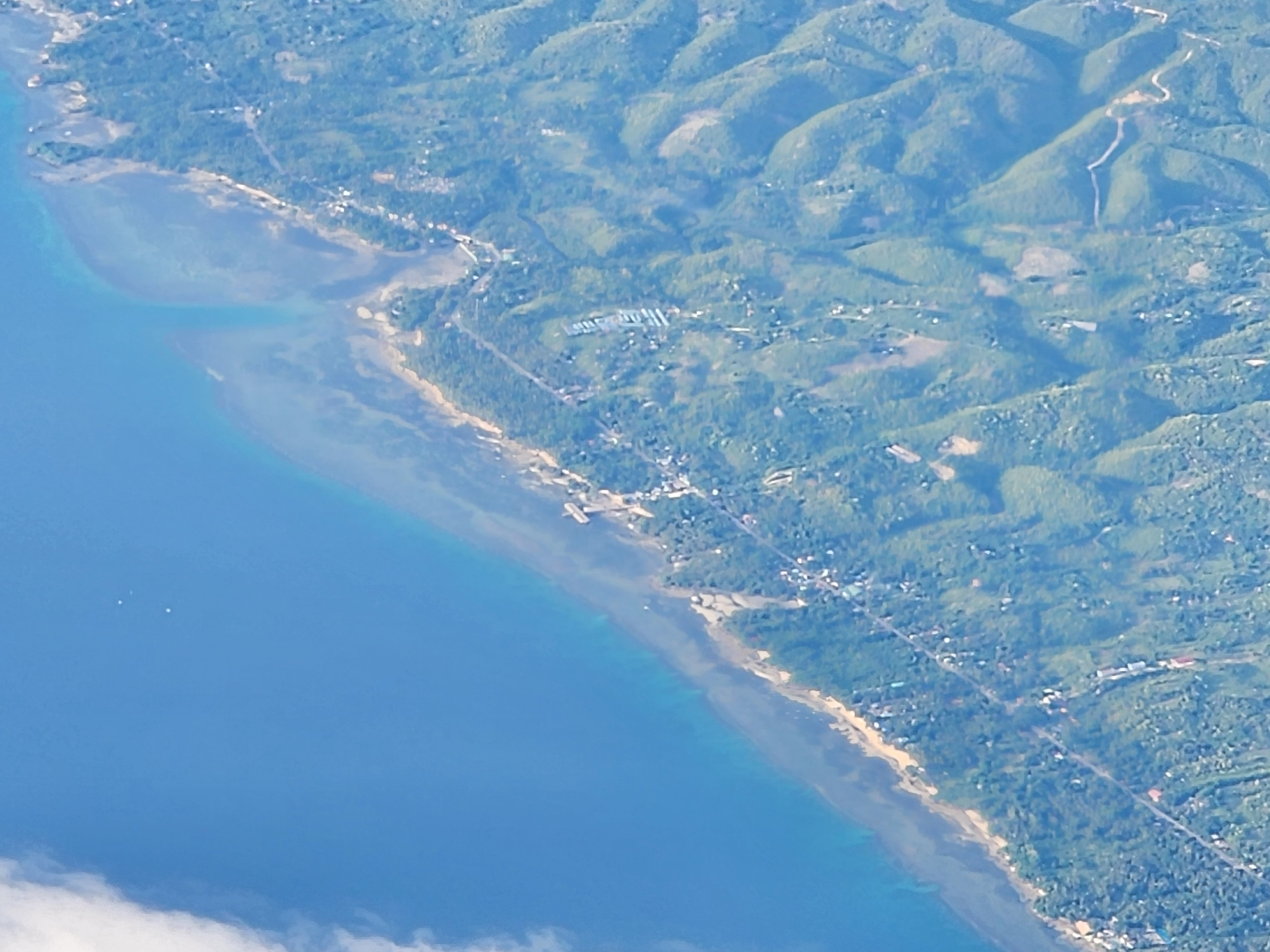
- Aerial view of Tuburan

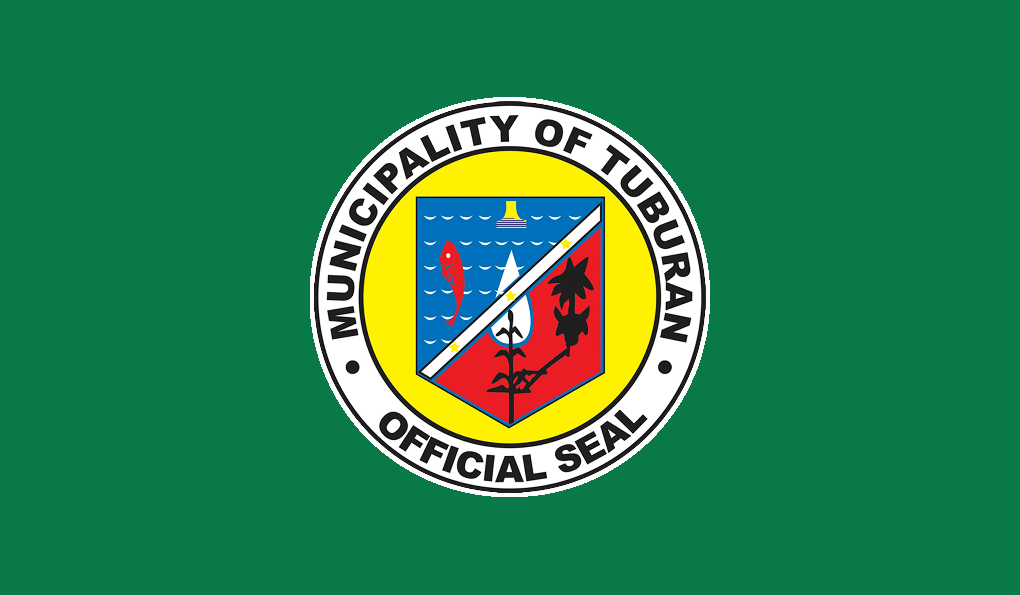
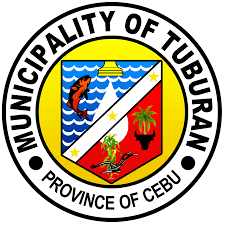
- Flag Seal
- Nickname(s): Spring of Hope and Success, Gem of The Midwest
- Anthem: Tuburan, Cebu hymn
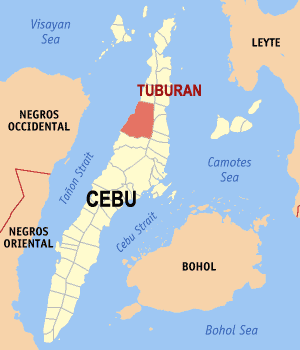
- Map of Cebu with Tuburan highlighted
- Interactive map of Tuburan
- Location within the Philippines
- Coordinates: 10°44′N 123°50′E
- Country: Philippines
- Region: Central Visayas
- Province: Cebu
- District: 3rd district
- Founded: 1851
- Named for: Spring (hydrology)
- Barangays: 54 (see Barangays)

Government
  - Type: Sangguniang Bayan
  - Mayor: Christian Daniel B. Diamante (Lakas-CMD)
  - Vice Mayor: Danilo M. Diamante (Lakas-CMD)
  - Representative: Karen Hope Flores-Garcia
  - Municipal Council: Members: Wilfredo M. Diamante; Dominador Pesiao; Louise A. Potencioso; Eugenio M. Arigo; Rodillo A. Dela Cerna; Carmelli Luz G. Suezo; Glenn Regado; Marvin M. Monterola
  - Electorate: 46,602 voters (2025)

Area
  - Total: 233.56 km^{2} (90.18 sq mi)
- Elevation: 57 m (187 ft)
- Highest elevation: 294 m (965 ft)
- Lowest elevation: −1 m (−3.3 ft)

Population (2024 census)
  - Total: 68,307
  - Density: 292.46/km^{2} (757.47/sq mi)
  - Households: 17,312

Economy
  - Income class: 1st municipal income class
  - Poverty incidence: 25.52% (2023)
  - Revenue: ₱ 332.9 million (2024)
  - Assets: ₱ 1,724 million (2024)
  - Expenditure: ₱ 182.8 million (2024)
  - Liabilities: ₱ 51.74 million (2024)

Service provider
  - Electricity: Cebu 2 Electric Cooperative (CEBECO 2)
- Time zone: UTC+8 (PST)
- ZIP code: 6043
- PSGC: 072252000
- IDD : area code: +63 (0)32
- Native languages: Cebuano; Tagalog
- Website: www.tuburancebu.gov.ph

Tuburan, officially the Municipality of Tuburan (Cebuano: Lungsod sa Tuburan; Tagalog: Bayan ng Tuburan), is a municipality in the province of Cebu, Philippines. According to the 2024 census, it has a population of 68,307 people.

Tuburan was the hometown of the revolutionary leader Arcadio Maxilom. And is also known for its crystal-clear springs, beaches, creeks, rivers, caves and natural attractions.

Industrial and domestic products include decorative apparel and fashion accessories made of seashells and coconut shells, wood and other indigenous products. Tubod Festival is held every 13 June in honor of the parish patron, Saint Anthony of Padua.

== Etymology ==
The name "Tuburan" is derived from the Cebuano root word tubod, which translates to "spring." With the addition of the suffix -an—which indicates a location of abundance or a place where something is gathered—the town's name literally translates to "a place of many springs."

According to local historical accounts, when the town's founder, Don Mariano Montebon, arrived in the 1850s, he observed the remarkably shallow water table. Upon instructing a resident to dig a small hole in the ground, water immediately gushed forth. The local reportedly explained, "Ingon man gyud diri, senyor, bisan asa, bangag, tubig!" (That is how it is here, sir; wherever there is a hole, there is water!).

Historical records also indicate that the name "Tuburan" was once shared by other spring-rich settlements in the province. One notable example, present-day Alegria, was originally known as Tuburan due to their similar topography, before it was officially renamed in the mid-to-late 19th century to establish a distinct municipal identity.

== History ==
=== Precolonial era ===
Long before Spanish arrival, archaeological excavations in the hills of Cogon, located about a kilometer northwest of the present town center, have unearthed compelling evidence of early habitation dating back to the Philippine Metal Age and the Age of Contact (1200–1400 CE). Artifacts such as Sa Huỳnh-Kalanay type pottery, footed trays, Asian trade ware ceramics, and gold jewelry point to a vibrant, interconnected community. Early settlements such as Potat (present-day Putat) were already established during this time. Like many coastal villages of the pre-colonial Sugbu polity, these populations were part of a larger trading network that reached as far as Mindanao, though they later faced depopulation due to retaliatory Moro slave raids during the early colonial period.

=== Spanish era foundation ===
The official founding of the municipality occurred in 1851 under the leadership of Don Mariano Montebon, a native of the neighboring town of Sogod. Recognizing the value of the widespread springs, Montebon established the first townsite at Daan Lungsod (old town), located just north of the present poblacion across the Adela River. In gratitude for his leadership, the locals chose him as their first gobernadorcillo.

The town center shifted a few times in its early years. In 1852, Montebon's successor, Don Vicente Bato (popularly known as Sente Bungot), relocated the seat of government to Sitio Daligdigan in Barangay Carmelo to take advantage of the favorable harbor and marine life. However, this location was short-lived. In 1853, Don Diego Tabotabo, a wealthy hacendero from Liloan, took over and eventually moved the capital in 1857 to its current location.

The spiritual foundation of Tuburan was solidified during this period. On July 26, 1854, a royal decree established Tuburan as a separate parish from Pinamungajan, which was confirmed by Bishop of Cebu at that time, Romualdo Jimeno Ballesteros, O.P., on February 13, 1857. Spearheaded by Rev. Fr. Prospero Salazar, the locals built the original Iglesia Parroquial de San Antonio de Padua using limestone and coral in a modest Baroque architectural style. Between 1884 and 1891, using the same local labor mobilized under the polo y servicios system, the parish erected a semi-Romanesque/Baroque stone church (1884) which was later destroyed in the Second World War but rebuilt, an adjacent limestone bell tower (1885), and a massive parochial convent made of coral stone and premium hardwood (completed in 1891 under Fr. Mauricio Esmero).

Also during this era, Tuburan's municipal boundaries were progressively adjusted. On July 24, 1878, the spring-rich communities of Naghalin and Bagacua (which originally shared the name Tuburan and lay under its jurisdiction) petitioned to secede. By virtue of Royal Decree 508, these communities merged to form the new municipality of Asturias. Concurrently, as mentioned, another southwestern community sharing the same topography and name was renamed Alegria to avoid administrative confusion.

=== Philippine revolution ===
Tuburan played a pivotal role in the Philippine Revolution, largely due to one of its most prominent sons: General Arcadio Maxílom y Molero. Born in Tuburan in 1862 to a principalía family, Maxílom initially worked as a school teacher before joining the Katipunan. Following the assassination of León Kilat, Maxílom took command of the Cebuano revolutionary forces.

=== The Battle of Tuburan and the Great Fire of 1898 ===
During the ongoing revolution against Spain, the conflict reached Tuburan in early April 1898. On April 7, General Arcadio Maxilom arrived at the home of the town's gobernadorcillo, Don Fausto Tabotabo, to assert Katipunan authority over the local Spanish government. This prompted the local Guardia Civil to peacefully surrender their firearms. Maxilom and Tabotabo immediately began rallying the townspeople to prepare for an inevitable Spanish retaliation, arming them with whatever was available, including swords, unsharpened bolos (pinuti), scythes, and sharpened palm-wood sticks (bahi).

On April 11, Katipunan Colonel Bonifacio Aranas arrived in Tuburan alongside commanders Aguedo Batubalonos and Emilio Verdeflor. To solidify the uprising, they publicly tore up Spanish government documents at the town plaza and distributed amulets (anting-anting) to the local fighters, instructing them that the talismans would provide courage and protection from bullets. Aranas also trained the townspeople in military maneuvers, specifically teaching them how to drop to the ground and utilize ambush tactics against incoming gunfire.

The battle officially commenced on the morning of April 15, 1898, when Spanish ships, Don Juan de Austria and Paragua, carrying cazadores (light infantry) and loyalist volunteers arrived at the Tuburan coastline. As the Spanish forces marched toward the town plaza near the San Antonio de Padua Church, they were ambushed by the hidden Katipuneros. A fierce close-quarters melee ensued from the plaza down to the shore. The Cebuanos fought fiercely with blades and spears against Spanish rifles and bayonets, leading to a bloody engagement.

The battle resulted in heavy casualties, including the deaths of 45 Cebuanos, among them several of Maxilom's own relatives. In the midst of the conflict, the Spanish forces burned almost every building in the town center to the ground. They spared only the parish church, the convent in its yard, and the municipal building, which also served as the residence of Don Fausto Tabotabo.

=== Commonwealth period ===
During the American colonial era in April 14, 1914, under the term of Municipal President Don Jose "Peping" Veloso, the local government acquired the historic 1889 Fausto Tabotabo ancestral house to serve as the permanent municipal hall for over a century. The deed of sale was signed by Doña Florencia Tabotabo and remains a government building to this day.

By the subsequent establishment of the Philippine Commonwealth in 1935, Tuburan experienced a period of civil and infrastructural development. The municipality became a vital political hub in the northwestern part of the province, serving as a key constituency of Cebu's 7th congressional district. During this era, political figures such as Buenaventura Rodríguez and José V. Rodríguez represented Tuburan and its neighboring towns in the National Assembly.

The Commonwealth period also saw a strong emphasis on public education and local governance. By the late 1930s, the town was flourishing, marked by the construction of a new parish church for the San Antonio de Padua parish in 1937 led by Fr. Esteban Montecillo, replacing older colonial-era structures.

=== World War II and Japanese occupation ===
The peaceful administration of the Commonwealth was violently interrupted by the outbreak of World War II. Following the fall of Bataan, Japanese Imperial forces landed in Cebu on April 10, 1942. As organized United States Army Forces in the Far East (USAFFE) resistance collapsed, many Filipino soldiers and local residents retreated into the rugged highlands of Cebu, and Tuburan quickly became a stronghold for the guerrilla resistance movement.

Under the umbrella of the Cebu Area Command, led by American Colonel James M. Cushing, local Cebuanos heavily utilized Tuburan's natural topography to outmaneuver the Japanese. The sprawling, high-ceilinged caves of the Marmol Cliff were repurposed as strategic hideouts and operational bases for the guerrillas. Meanwhile, in the coastal area of Daan Lungsod, the Lantawan Tunnel was utilized as a subterranean refuge to evade aerial strafing from Japanese fighter planes. Tuburan functioned as a critical communication node; the local guerrilla headquarters established a highly efficient, makeshift barbed-wire telephone system that kept them connected with other regiments across the island.

In early February 1945, a sizable Japanese force launched an offensive threatening to overtake Tuburan. In response, guerrilla commanders urgently requested American air support. On February 14, 1945, the U.S. Thirteenth Air Force dispatched Guerrilla Air Support Team No. 1, which flew into a makeshift airstrip in Tuburan. Guided by local volunteer guards who helped manually haul American equipment through steep jungle terrain, the team successfully coordinated airstrikes. They directed bombers to strike the head of the Japanese column advancing near Lugo, Sogod, effectively halting the enemy's offensive and forcing the Japanese to retreat in small, fragmented groups.

When the American liberation forces officially landed in Cebu in March 1945 to drive out the remaining Japanese occupiers, heavy aerial bombardments devastated much of the province. However, Tuburan was remarkably fortunate compared to other major towns. While central areas like Cebu City and Talisay were flattened, wartime records indicate that Tuburan lost only about 1 percent of its private residential houses. Nevertheless, the town did not escape completely unscathed; approximately 80 percent of its public buildings were destroyed, and the 1937 San Antonio de Padua church sustained heavy damage, requiring extensive post-war rehabilitation to restore the town's structural heritage.

=== Post-war period and the Tabuelan secession ===
Following the widespread devastation of World War II, Tuburan entered a period of intensive infrastructural and social rehabilitation. In late 1945, the Cebu North Provincial High School was established in Tuburan.

In 1951, the municipality celebrated its first centennial, commemorating its official 1851 founding by Don Mariano Montebon. This centennial celebration served as a unifying milestone, helping the townsfolk reaffirm their shared identity and resilience after the war. During this reconstructive decade, local political leadership—often drawn from the descendants of the town's founding families, such as the Tabotabos and Montebons—focused heavily on rebuilding public schools, markets, and the agricultural sector, firmly re-establishing Tuburan as a major producer of crops in Cebu's northwestern corridor.

However, the post-war decades also brought significant territorial changes. By the early 1950s, the northern barrio of Tabuelan had grown to become Tuburan’s largest and most populous barangay. Due to the considerable distance between Tabuelan and the administrative center in Poblacion Tuburan, residents of the northern barrio found it increasingly difficult to access basic municipal services and infrastructure. Championed by then-Governor Sergio "Serging" Osmeña Jr., a local movement for Tabuelan's independence gained political traction. Although the municipal government of Tuburan initially opposed the partition to avoid negative economic repercussions, they ultimately conceded to the national mandate. On October 23, 1953, President Elpidio Quirino signed Executive Order No. 621, officially separating Tabuelan and establishing it as an independent municipality. On June 18, 1961, Republic Act No. 3433 converted the Cebu North Provincial School into the Tuburan Vocational School.

=== Martial Law era ===
The declaration of Martial Law by President Ferdinand Marcos on September 21, 1972, abruptly altered the political and social landscape of Tuburan, mirroring the climate across the Philippines. The era saw the suspension of democratic local elections; consequently, incumbent mayors and municipal officials either remained in power as holdovers for extended periods or were replaced by appointed Officers-in-Charge (OICs) loyal to the central administration.

During this period, Tuburan's rural and mountainous topography—which had once served as a tactical haven for World War II guerrillas—became a focal point for the Armed Forces of the Philippines in their counter-insurgency campaigns against the New People's Army (NPA). The resulting militarization led to intermittent skirmishes in the hinterland barangays, disrupting the livelihoods of local farmers and creating a climate of unease. Civil liberties were heavily restricted, and political opposition within the municipality was driven underground. On the verge of the polarizing era, under Batas Pambansa Blg. 412 on June 10, 1983, the Tuburan Vocational School was integrated into the Cebu State College of Science and Technology (CSCST) as the CSCST-Polytechnic College, Tuburan Campus.

=== People Power period ===
The peaceful overthrow of the Marcos administration during the 1986 People Power Revolution brought immediate political restructuring to Tuburan. Following the installation of President Corazon C. Aquino, local government structures nationwide were reorganized to dismantle the remnants of the dictatorship. Incumbent officials who had served extended terms during the Martial Law era, such as Mayor Jesus Montecillo, were replaced by appointed Officers-in-Charge (OICs) to manage the transition. Marcial Banate served as the OIC Mayor from 1986 to 1987, ensuring the stabilization of local administrative functions and the restoration of democratic processes until regular elections could be held. This transitional period also involved the reorganization of the local municipal courts, aligning Tuburan's judiciary with the newly established Provisional "Freedom" Constitution.

=== Contemporary era and as the Coffee Capital of Cebu ===
Finally, on November 10, 2009, Republic Act No. 9744 formally converted all CSCST campuses into the unified Cebu Technological University (CTU), establishing CTU-Tuburan Campus as a premier institution of higher learning in northern Cebu.

In the 21st century, Tuburan shifted its focus toward sustainable agriculture and ecotourism, fundamentally transforming its local economy. A defining milestone occurred in 2012 under the administration of Mayor Democrito "Aljun" Diamante, who initiated a massive upland reforestation and livelihood program. Starting with 30,000 Robusta coffee saplings, the local government trained farmers to cultivate the crop as a sustainable alternative to deforestation-heavy practices like charcoal making and firewood gathering.

Today, Tuburan is widely recognized as the "Coffee Capital of Cebu." The municipality boasts over 3,000 hectares of coffee plantations spread across 29 hinterland barangays, providing a steady livelihood for more than 2,000 local farmers. This agricultural success has become a major driver of regional agro-tourism. The Tuburan Coffee Farm, prominently featuring sites in Barangay Kabangkalan, offers visitors a comprehensive seed-to-cup experience, showcasing the meticulous harvesting, hand-sorting, and roasting processes of local Robusta beans.

== Geography ==
Tuburan is bordered to the north by the town of Tabuelan, to the west is the Tañon Strait, to the east are the towns of Carmen, Catmon and Sogod, and to the south is the town of Asturias. It is 82 kilometres (51 mi) from Cebu City.

Tuburan is the largest municipality in Cebu in terms of land area. It also has the most number of barangays for a municipality in Cebu. And it is also the only municipality in Cebu to have numerous barangays with very small population count. Most of these barangays are located in the mountains. The barangay with the lowest population count is Barangay Kanlunsing with 204 people as of 2024, though the barangay with the lowest recorded population count on Cebu Island is located in the nearby municipality of Catmon, which is the Barangay of Amancion, with 190 people in 2016.

=== Barangays ===
Tuburan is politically subdivided into 54 barangays. Each barangay consists of puroks and some have sitios.

PSGC	Barangay	Population			±% p.a.	
		2024		2010		
072252001	Alegria	1.4%	958	962	▾	−0.03%
072252002	Amatugan	1.2%	816	922	▾	−0.84%
072252003	Antipolo	1.8%	1,246	1,120	▴	0.74%
072252004	Apalan	2.4%	1,665	1,387	▴	1.28%
072252005	Bagasawe	2.7%	1,812	1,564	▴	1.03%
072252006	Bakyawan	1.3%	880	890	▾	−0.08%
072252007	Bangkito	0.4%	296	273	▴	0.56%
072252047	Barangay I (Poblacion)	2.2%	1,512	1,585	▾	−0.33%
072252048	Barangay II (Poblacion)	2.8%	1,928	1,665	▴	1.02%
072252049	Barangay III (Poblacion)	0.4%	299	269	▴	0.74%
072252050	Barangay IV (Poblacion)	0.4%	254	294	▾	−1.01%
072252051	Barangay V (Poblacion)	1.5%	1,011	843	▴	1.27%
072252052	Barangay VI (Poblacion)	3.1%	2,084	1,820	▴	0.94%
072252053	Barangay VII (Poblacion)	2.0%	1,373	1,116	▴	1.45%
072252054	Barangay VIII (Poblacion)	3.6%	2,488	1,980	▴	1.60%
072252008	Bulwang	1.0%	674	808	▾	−1.25%
072252015	Caridad	2.3%	1,604	1,576	▴	0.12%
072252016	Carmelo	3.2%	2,168	2,164	▴	0.01%
072252017	Cogon	5.1%	3,451	3,125	▴	0.69%
072252018	Colonia	3.8%	2,615	2,255	▴	1.03%
072252019	Daan Lungsod	3.8%	2,591	2,132	▴	1.36%
072252020	Fortaliza	2.0%	1,353	1,161	▴	1.07%
072252021	Ga‑ang	1.0%	657	538	▴	1.40%
072252022	Gimama‑a	2.1%	1,442	1,379	▴	0.31%
072252023	Jagbuaya	2.0%	1,397	1,361	▴	0.18%
072252009	Kabangkalan	1.2%	818	730	▴	0.79%
072252024	Kabkaban	0.7%	503	446	▴	0.84%
072252025	Kagba‑o	0.7%	510	558	▾	−0.62%
072252010	Kalangahan	2.3%	1,554	1,467	▴	0.40%
072252011	Kamansi	0.8%	539	480	▴	0.81%
072252026	Kampoot	0.8%	573	435	▴	1.93%
072252012	Kan‑an	0.5%	315	279	▴	0.85%
072252013	Kanlunsing	0.3%	204	365	▾	−3.96%
072252014	Kansi	1.8%	1,250	991	▴	1.62%
072252027	Kaorasan	0.5%	375	333	▴	0.83%
072252028	Libo	0.4%	301	255	▴	1.16%
072252029	Lusong	1.4%	962	801	▴	1.28%
072252030	Macupa	0.5%	364	343	▴	0.41%
072252031	Mag‑alwa	1.1%	726	698	▴	0.27%
072252032	Mag‑antoy	1.1%	724	675	▴	0.49%
072252033	Mag‑atubang	1.3%	921	1,096	▾	−1.20%
072252034	Maghan‑ay	0.9%	620	644	▾	−0.26%
072252035	Mangga	4.5%	3,042	2,804	▴	0.57%
072252036	Marmol	2.1%	1,461	1,416	▴	0.22%
072252037	Molobolo	1.0%	655	538	▴	1.37%
072252038	Montealegre	2.4%	1,664	1,741	▾	−0.31%
072252039	Putat	6.1%	4,171	4,001	▴	0.29%
072252040	San Juan	1.4%	974	841	▴	1.02%
072252041	Sandayong	1.5%	1,025	801	▴	1.73%
072252042	Santo Niño	0.7%	450	377	▴	1.24%
072252043	Siotes	0.7%	452	450	▴	0.03%
072252044	Sumon	1.3%	907	1,041	▾	−0.95%
072252045	Tominjao	1.4%	951	806	▴	1.15%
072252046	Tomugpa	0.4%	281	313	▾	−0.75%
	Total		68,307	58,914	▴	1.03%

=== Climate ===
The city has a tropical savanna climate (Koppen: Aw), narrowly missing a tropical monsoon climate (Koppen:Am), due to the month of February having less than 60mm of rain. From 1973 to 1999, 28 typhoons (110 kilometers per hour wind), occurred. 13 storms passed with 65 to 109 km/h wind and 14 depressions passed with winds not more than 64 km/h. Strongest typhoons that hit the area and caused significant damage since 1951 are Amy (240 km/h) on December 10, 1951, Nitang (176 km/h) on September 2, 1984, Ruping (185 km/h) on November 10, 1990, Bising (120 km/h) on April 14, 1994, Yolanda (315 km/h) on November 8, 2013, Odette (195 km/h) on December 16, 2021, and Tino (205 km/h) on November 4, 2025.

Climate data for Tuburan, Cebu
Month	Jan	Feb	Mar	Apr	May	Jun	Jul	Aug	Sep	Oct	Nov	Dec	Year
Mean daily maximum °C (°F)	28 (82)	29 (84)	30 (86)	31 (88)	31 (88)	30 (86)	30 (86)	30 (86)	30 (86)	29 (84)	29 (84)	28 (82)	30 (85)
Mean daily minimum °C (°F)	23 (73)	23 (73)	23 (73)	24 (75)	25 (77)	25 (77)	25 (77)	25 (77)	25 (77)	25 (77)	24 (75)	23 (73)	24 (75)
Average precipitation mm (inches)	70 (2.8)	49 (1.9)	62 (2.4)	78 (3.1)	138 (5.4)	201 (7.9)	192 (7.6)	185 (7.3)	192 (7.6)	205 (8.1)	156 (6.1)	111 (4.4)	1,639 (64.6)
Average rainy days	13.4	10.6	13.1	14.5	24.2	27.9	28.4	27.7	27.1	27.4	22.5	15.9	252.7
Source: Meteoblue (modeled/calculated data, not measured locally)

== Demographics ==
Population census of Tuburan

Year	Pop.	±% p.a.
1903	19,158	—
1918	30,568	+3.16%
1939	45,750	+1.94%
1948	53,654	+1.79%
1960	37,720	−2.89%
1970	41,071	+0.85%
1975	38,600	−1.24%
1980	42,968	+2.17%

Year	Pop.	±% p.a.
1990	43,078	+0.03%
1995	47,818	+1.98%
2000	51,845	+1.75%
2007	53,663	+0.48%
2010	58,914	+3.46%
2015	63,866	+1.55%
2020	68,167	+1.38%
2024	68,307	+0.05%

Source: Philippine Statistics Authority

== Economy ==
Poverty incidence of Tuburan (%)

Source: Philippine Statistics Authority

There is a 2,000 hectares (4,900 acres) coffee farm which has the capacity to produce 4.3 million kilograms (9.5 million pounds), which if when roasted can be sold at the (2017) prevailing price of ₱600 per kilogram (₱270/lb), and the farm could earn ₱2 billion annually. This farm is located within the mountain barangay of Kabangkalan.

In addition, the coffee farm is gaining ground as a tourist attraction in an ecotourism niche.

== Elected Officials ==
2025–2028 Tuburan, Cebu Officials
Position	Name	Party	Start of term	End of term	Term
Mayor	Christian Daniel B. Diamante	Lakas	June 30, 2025	June 30, 2028	1
Vice Mayor	Danilo M. Diamante	Lakas	June 30, 2022	June 30, 2028	2
Councilors	Wilfredo M. Diamante	Lakas	June 30, 2022	June 30, 2028	2
Councilors	Dominador P. Pesiao	Independent	June 30, 2025	June 30, 2028	1
Councilors	Louise A. Potencioso	Lakas	June 30, 2019	June 30, 2028	3
Councilors	Eugenio M. Arigo	Lakas	June 30, 2019	June 30, 2028	3
Councilors	Rodillo A. Dela Cerna	Lakas	June 30, 2019	June 30, 2028	3
Councilors	Carmelli Luz G. Suezo	Lakas	June 30, 2019	June 30, 2028	3
Councilors	Glenn G. Regado	Lakas	June 30, 2025	June 30, 2028	1
Councilors	Marvin M. Monterola	Lakas	June 30, 2019	June 30, 2028	3
Ex Officio Municipal Council Members
ABC President	Rodelo M. Diamante	Nonpartisan		January 1, 2027	1
SK Federation President	Beryl C. Encabo	Nonpartisan		January 1, 2027	1

== Transportation ==
Ceres Liner and Corominas Bros. are among the bus companies going to the town. But riding a V-Hire is the quickest way of going to the town. There are three ways of getting to the town:

- V-Hire – Via Transcentral Highway (Balamban) – 80 km
- Ceres Liner – Via Lugo (Tabuelan) – 100 km
- Corominas Bros. – Via Toledo City – 110 km

== Education ==
The public schools in the town of Tuburan are administered by two school districts under the Schools Division of Cebu Province. The only higher education institution of the town, Cebu Technological University, is administered by the office of the Commission on Higher Education (CHED).

=== Elementary schools ===
- Amatugan Elementary School — Amatugan
- Antipolo Elementary School — Antipolo
- Apalan Elementary School — Apalan
- Archdiocesan Shrine of Saint Anthony of Padua Parish School — Poblacion
- Bagasawe Elementary School — Bagasawe
- Bakyawan Elementary School — Bakyawan
- Bangkito Elementary School — Bangkito
- Bulwang Elementary School — Bulwang
- Caridad Elementary School — Caridad
- Carmelo Elementary School — Carmelo
- Colonia Central Elementary School — Colonia
- Cogon Elementary School — Cogon
- Daanlungsod Elementary School — Daan Lungsod
- Fortaliza Elementary School — Fortaliza
- Gaang Elementary School — Gaang
- Gimama-a Elementary School — Gimama-a
- Jagbuaya Elementary School — Jagbuaya
- Kabangkalan Elementary School — Kabangkalan
- Kabkaban Elementary School — Kabkaban
- Kagbao Elementary School — Kagba-o
- Kalangahan Elementary School — Kalangahan
- Kalunsing Elementary School — Kanlunsing
- Kamansi Elementary School — Kamansi
- Kampoot Elementary School — Kampoot
- Kan-an Elementary School — Kan-an
- Kansi Elementary School — Kansi
- Kaorasan Primary School — Kaorasan
- Libo Elementary School — Libo
- Lusong Elementary School — Lusong
- Macupa Elementary School — Macupa
- Mag-agta Elementary School — Sitio Mag-agta, Lusong
- Mag-alwa Elementary School — Mag-alwa
- Mag-antoy Elementary School — Mag-antoy
- Mag-atubang Elementary School — Mag-atubang
- Maghan-ay Elementary School — Maghan-ay
- Mangga Elementary School — Mangga
- Marmol Elementary School — Marmol
- Matnog Elementary School — Sitio Matnog, Putat
- Molobolo Elementary School — Molobolo
- Montealegre Elementary School — Montealegre
- Putat Elementary School — Putat
- Sandayong Elementary School — Sandayong
- San Juan Elementary School — San Juan
- Siotes Elementary School — Siotes
- Sto. Niño Elementary School — Sto. Niño
- Tominjao Elementary School — Tominjao
- Tomugpa Primary School — Tomugpa
- Tuburan Central Elementary School — C. Parilla Street, Barangay VII

=== High schools ===
- Ireneo V. Diamante National High School – Kabangkalan
- Kalangahan National High School – Kalangahan
- Kansi National High School – Kansi
- Lusong National High School – Lusong
- Montealegre National High School – Montealegre
- Putat National High School – Putat
- Tuburan National High School – Barangay VII
- Vicente Cabahug National High School (formerly Colonia NHS) — Colonia

=== Private schools ===
- Saint Anthony's Academy Tuburan – Poblacion Barangay IV Allego St.
- Ect Excellencia Global Academy Foundation, Inc. (EEGAFI) Tuburan – Barangay VIII

=== Integrated schools ===
- Paulo Gallarde Sr. Integrated School – Alegria
- Sumon Integrated School – Sumon

=== Tertiary ===
- Cebu Technological University Tuburan Campus – Barangay VIII

== Sources ==
- Cebu Daily News, Joeber Bersales (4 October 2008). "Museum for Tuburan, more gold in Boljoon". Archived from the original on 25 December 2014.
- The Freeman, Emil Justimbaste (1 June 1998). "Recruitment and Beginnings". León Kilat and Cebu's Revolution. Archived from the original on 27 October 2009.
- The Freeman, Ehda M. Dagooc (10 March 2017). "Coffee farm emerges as new tourist magnet". Archived from the original on 22 March 2017.
- The Freeman, De Dios, Kristine (6 December 2024). "Updated Income Classifications of Towns and Cities in the Province of Cebu"
