= Asturias, Cebu =

Municipality in Cebu, Philippines

Asturias
- Municipality
- Municipality of Asturias
- Etymology: Principality of Asturias, Spain
- Anthem: Asturias Hymn
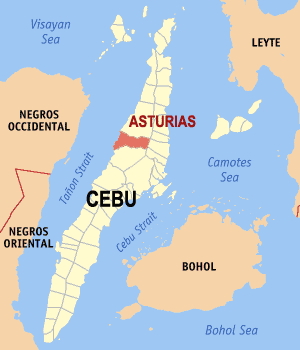
- Map of Cebu with Asturias highlighted
- Interactive map of Asturias
- Location within the Philippines
- Coordinates: 10°34′04″N 123°43′02″E
- Country: Philippines
- Region: Central Visayas
- Province: Cebu
- District: 3rd district
- Named for: Asturias, Spain
- Barangays: 27 (see Barangays)

Government
  - Type: Sangguniang Bayan
  - Mayor: Dana Andrew M. Dumdum
  - Vice Mayor: Reine P. Yaras
  - Representative: Karen Hope F. Garcia
  - Municipal Council: Members: Christian M. Cañada; Joel Pablo M. Dumdum; Martie C. Maravillas; Margarita B. Cece; Jose Antonio T. Pintor; John Carl T. Dupal-ag; Ruel C. Derit; Mark Paulus S. Noel
  - Electorate: 37,684 voters (2025)

Area
  - Total: 190.45 km^{2} (73.53 sq mi)
- Elevation: 24 m (79 ft)
- Highest elevation: 236 m (774 ft)
- Lowest elevation: −1 m (−3.3 ft)

Population (2024 census)
  - Total: 54,777
  - Density: 287.62/km^{2} (744.93/sq mi)
  - Households: 12,885

Economy
  - Income class: 1st municipal income class
  - Poverty incidence: 29.97% (2023)
  - Revenue: ₱ 278 million (2024)
  - Assets: ₱ 647.8 million (2024)
  - Expenditure: ₱ 191.1 million (2024)
  - Liabilities: ₱ 140.9 million (2024)

Service provider
  - Electricity: Cebu 3 Electric Cooperative (CEBECO 3)
- Time zone: UTC+8 (PST)
- ZIP code: 6042
- PSGC: 072206000
- IDD : area code: +63 (0)32
- Native languages: Cebuano; Tagalog

Asturias, officially the Municipality of Asturias (Cebuano: Lungsod sa Asturias; Tagalog: Bayan ng Asturias), is a municipality in the province of Cebu, Philippines. According to the 2024 census, it has a population of 54,777 people.

== History ==
The original name of Asturias is Naghalin, perhaps from the word lalin, native Cebuano term for settlers coming from far places. Other authorities say that "Naghalin" is a mispronunciation of the Cebuano word naghaling which means "making fire" as preparation for cooking. This assertion is supported by the old name of an adjacent municipality, "Bagacawa" (now known as Tuburan), which means "fiery cauldron" from the Cebuano baga (ember) and kawa (cauldron).

The first occupants of Asturias came from other places and neighboring islands such as Negros and Bohol. At first, one part of Naghalin was part of Tuburan and the other part of Balamban. Over time, the population of Naghalin increased because of immigration and natural population growth. Eventually the inhabitants petitioned Spain to grant them their own local government. This petition was granted in the late 19th century by Spain, thereby creating the pueblo (region) of Asturias. This event was witnessed by the arrival in 1888 of the alférez, Antonio Alonso, uncle of José Rizal.

== Geography ==
Asturias is bordered to the north by the town of Tuburan, to the west is the Tañon Strait, to the east is the city of Danao, and to the south is the town of Balamban. It is 56 kilometres (35 mi) from Cebu City.

=== Barangays ===
Asturias is politically subdivided into 27 barangays. Each barangay consists of puroks and some have sitios.

There are 7 barangays which located in coastal and 20 are inland.

PSGC	Barangay	Population			±% p.a.	
		2024		2010		
072206001	Agbanga	1.5%	838	786	▴	0.44%
072206002	Agtugop	1.8%	984	908	▴	0.56%
072206003	Bago	3.5%	1,940	1,880	▴	0.22%
072206004	Bairan	1.6%	876	714	▴	1.43%
072206005	Banban	1.5%	805	884	▾	−0.65%
072206006	Baye	1.1%	621	460	▴	2.10%
072206007	Bog‑o	0.7%	390	267	▴	2.66%
072206009	Kaluangan	1.2%	650	592	▴	0.65%
072206010	Lanao	1.2%	660	782	▾	−1.17%
072206011	Langub	6.7%	3,663	3,163	▴	1.02%
072206012	Looc Norte	4.4%	2,436	2,710	▾	−0.74%
072206013	Lunas	4.4%	2,401	2,127	▴	0.84%
072206014	Magcalape	0.8%	420	364	▴	1.00%
072206015	Manguiao	3.2%	1,760	1,627	▴	0.55%
072206016	New Bago	3.2%	1,741	1,510	▴	0.99%
072206017	Owak	7.0%	3,855	3,872	▾	−0.03%
072206018	Poblacion	10.0%	5,472	5,238	▴	0.30%
072206019	Saksak	0.6%	306	359	▾	−1.10%
072206020	San Isidro	5.3%	2,899	2,743	▴	0.38%
072206021	San Roque	4.9%	2,690	2,308	▴	1.07%
072206022	Santa Lucia	7.3%	3,984	3,494	▴	0.91%
072206023	Santa Rita	2.0%	1,076	1,027	▴	0.32%
072206024	Tag‑amakan	1.6%	891	763	▴	1.08%
072206025	Tagbubonga	0.8%	461	458	▴	0.05%
072206026	Tubigagmanok	8.2%	4,496	4,325	▴	0.27%
072206027	Tubod	1.6%	892	725	▴	1.45%
072206028	Ubogon	1.2%	650	646	▴	0.04%
	Total		54,777	44,732	▴	1.41%

=== Climate ===
Climate data for Asturias, Cebu
Month	Jan	Feb	Mar	Apr	May	Jun	Jul	Aug	Sep	Oct	Nov	Dec	Year
Mean daily maximum °C (°F)	28 (82)	29 (84)	30 (86)	31 (88)	31 (88)	30 (86)	30 (86)	30 (86)	30 (86)	29 (84)	29 (84)	28 (82)	30 (85)
Mean daily minimum °C (°F)	23 (73)	23 (73)	23 (73)	24 (75)	25 (77)	25 (77)	25 (77)	25 (77)	25 (77)	25 (77)	24 (75)	23 (73)	24 (75)
Average precipitation mm (inches)	70 (2.8)	49 (1.9)	62 (2.4)	78 (3.1)	138 (5.4)	201 (7.9)	192 (7.6)	185 (7.3)	192 (7.6)	205 (8.1)	156 (6.1)	111 (4.4)	1,639 (64.6)
Average rainy days	13.4	10.6	13.1	14.5	24.2	27.9	28.4	27.7	27.1	27.4	22.5	15.9	252.7
Source: Meteoblue (Use with caution: this is modeled/calculated data, not measured locally.)

== Demographics ==
Population census of Asturias
Year	Pop.	±% p.a.
1903	12,153	—
1918	14,756	+1.30%
1939	25,468	+2.63%
1948	29,932	+1.81%
1960	28,818	−0.32%
1970	25,157	−1.35%
1975	26,411	+0.98%
1980	28,655	+1.64%
1990	30,404	+0.59%
1995	33,355	+1.75%
2000	38,961	+3.39%
2007	40,939	+0.69%
2010	44,732	+3.28%
2015	47,857	+1.29%
2020	55,397	+3.13%
2024	54,777	−0.27%
Source: Philippine Statistics Authority

== Economy ==
Poverty incidence of Asturias (%)

Source: Philippine Statistics Authority
