= Gato Island =

Island in the Philippines

Gato
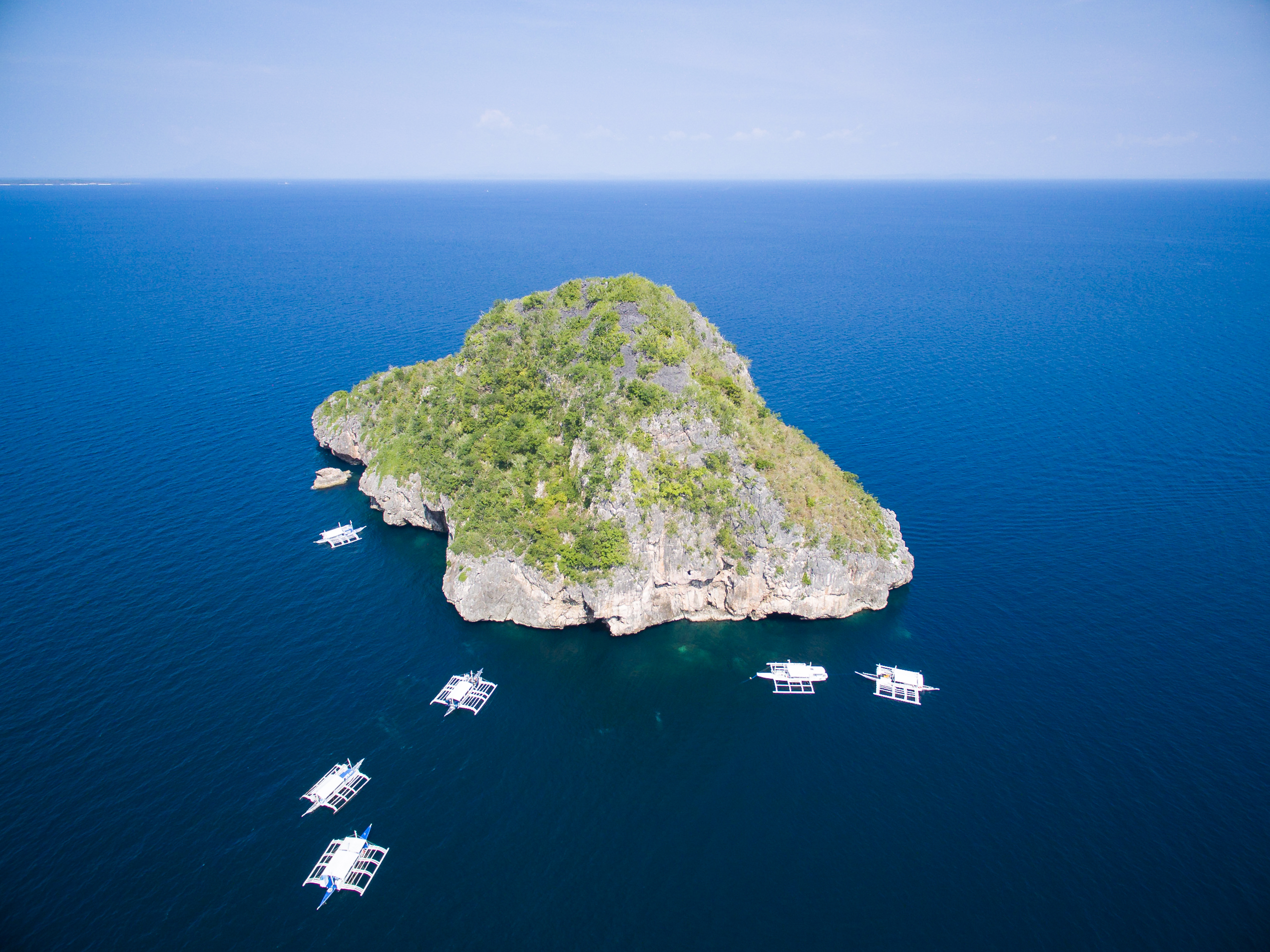
- Aerial view of Gato Island

- Location within Philippines Location within Visayas

Geography
- Location: Visayan Sea
- Coordinates: 11°26′50″N 124°01′15″E
- Highest elevation: 83 m (272 ft)

Administration
- Philippines
- Region: Central Visayas
- Province: Cebu
- Municipality: Daanbantayan

Gato Island is a rocky island located in the middle of Visayan Sea in the Asian country of Philippines. It rises from the sea in the general area between Malapascua Island and the more northern Carnaza Island, all of which are part of the municipality of Daanbantayan in the province of Cebu.

== Etymology ==
Gato Island or locally known as "Isla del Gato", which is Spanish for "Cat Island", was named so because of its shape that looks like a curled sleeping cat when looking from the mainland of Cebu.

== History ==
During 1933, two Japanese fishermen discovered a breeding ground of sea snakes around the island. It was believed that the locals were taught by the Japanese on how to catch the sea snakes, process the skins and even how to deal with snake bites.

The Island of Gato was previously under the administrative part of the Province of Masbate in Bicol Region of the Philippines but is more near to Daanbantayan. The supervision of the island started during 1997, when Daanbantayan passed a resolution declaring the island as a sea snake and fish sanctuary and assigning the Cebu State College of Science and Technology – College of Fisheries, Daanbantayan Campus (now known as the Daanbantayan Campus of the Cebu Technological University) to safeguard and develop the island for research purposes. In response, the school built a research center in the island along with underwater research equipment to conduct diving activities.

In 2001, the resolution was re-enacted to make the 2-nautical-mile periphery of the island as part of the sanctuary and transfer custody and management of the island to the Municipal Government of Daanbantayan.

== Geography ==
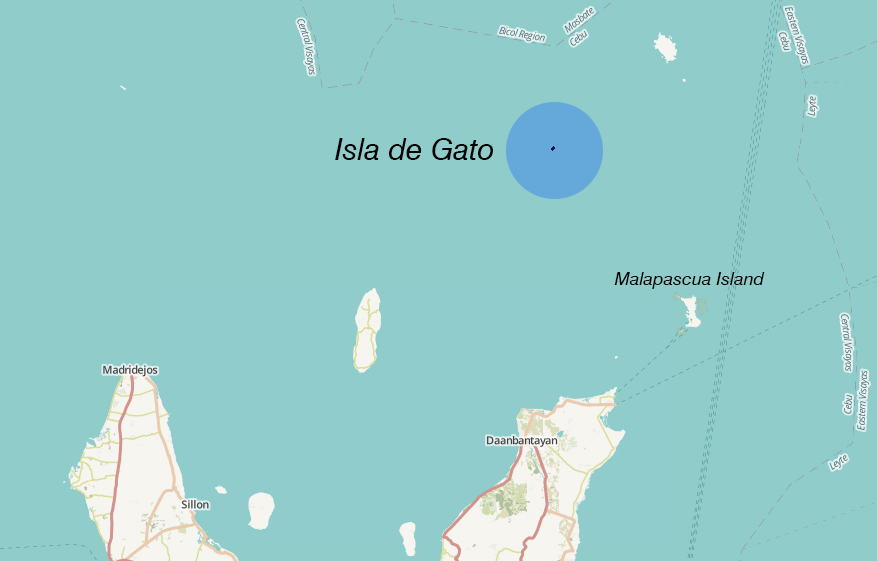
Isla del Gato located at the middle of the Visayan Sea. Above it to the NE is Carnaza Island. Below it to the SE is Malapascua Island, while to the SW is Guintacan Island (Kinatarkan).

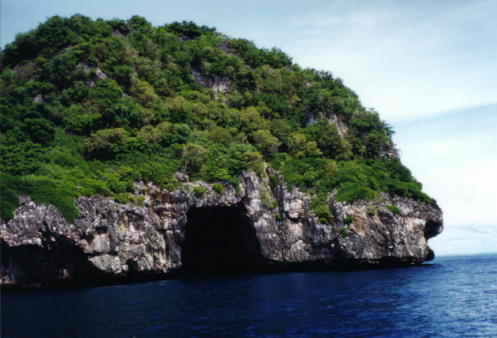
Cave Opening on the side of Isla del Gato

Isla del Gato is about 15 kilometers northwest from Malapascua Island and is about 83 metres (272 ft) high above sea level. It is home to many species of seabirds and some animals flit in and out of the caves in the sea. The island is constantly washed by strong currents thus creating side cuttings with high wall of rock faces.

There is an underwater cave where divers encounter poisonous sea snakes, colored fishes and some species of shark believed to be sleeping during the day, which can be seen about 30 meters deep on the ground of the sea. The view inside and under the water cave is magnificent and divers would often liken it as if you are looking to a glass stained window with sparkling blue color and the glowing water from the sunlight. Its elevation was recorded at 188 feet (57 m) in 1919.

== Accessibility ==
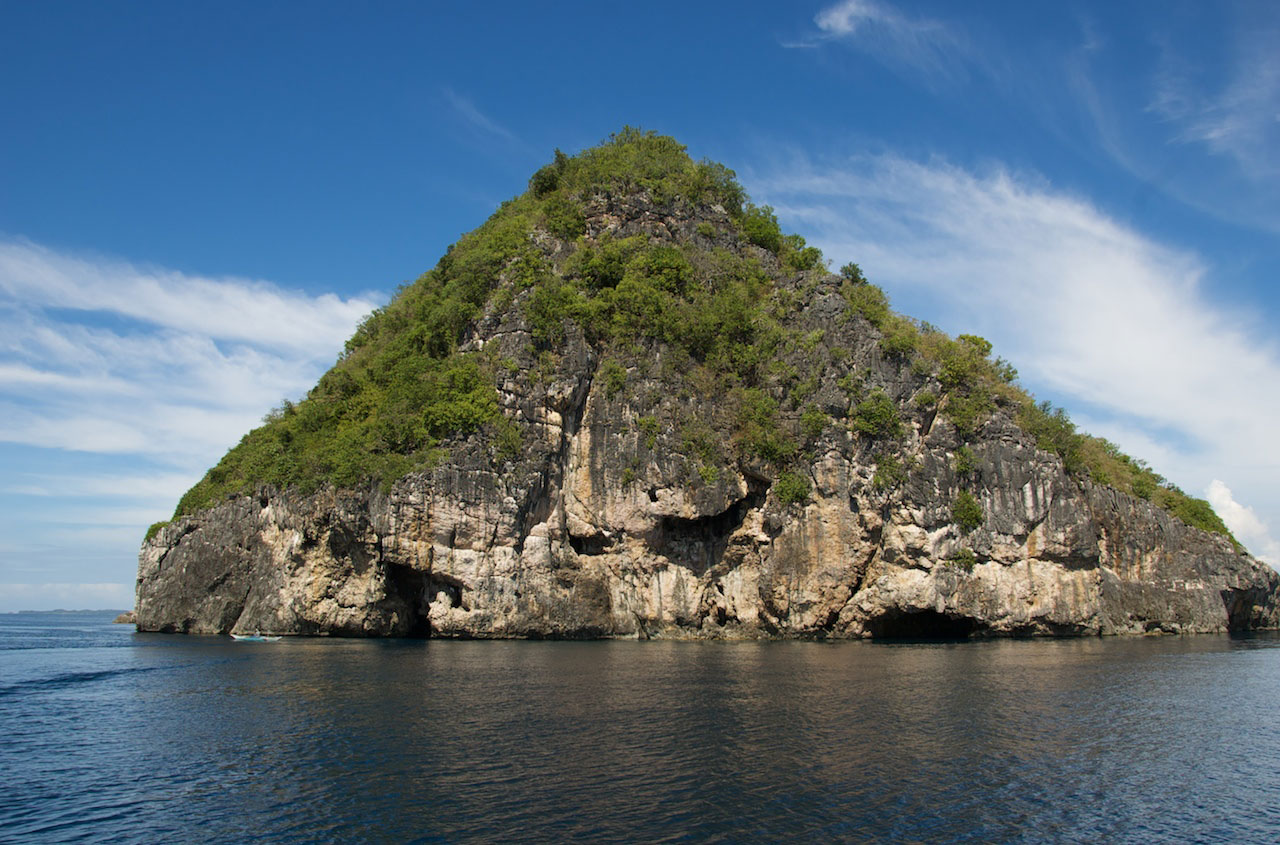
The side cuttings and rock face of the Gato Island from the frequent strong waves and current in the Visayan Sea

The Island can be reached from the three barangays of Daanbantayan namely, Tapilon, Maya, and Logon (Malapascua Island). It is 50 minutes by motorized boat from Malapascua Island. It is almost impossible to dock to the island due to undercutting of its side by wave action. Boats could come nearer the island rock face but would take a lot of precaution because of strong current.

Entering the cave of Gato Island can always be done with any outrigger boat. Everybody is allowed to enter the cave for diving and dock their boat inside or outside the opening of the cave. However, during high tide, it could be very difficult to come in due to the small opening that would make boat maneuverability troublesome. Once docked inside, divers are enjoined to do their diving activities with their diving instructors, dive masters or buddy, and those who cannot can do snorkeling but should take precaution since the island is haven for the yellow-lipped sea krait or locally known as "balingkasaw", a species of venomous sea snakes.
