= Aguho =

Aguho can refer to any of the following barangays in the Philippines:

- Aguho, barangay in the municipality of Pateros, Metro Manila
- Aguho, barangay in the municipality of Daanbantayan, Cebu
