= 2025 Cebu earthquake =

Magnitude 6.9 earthquake in the Philippines

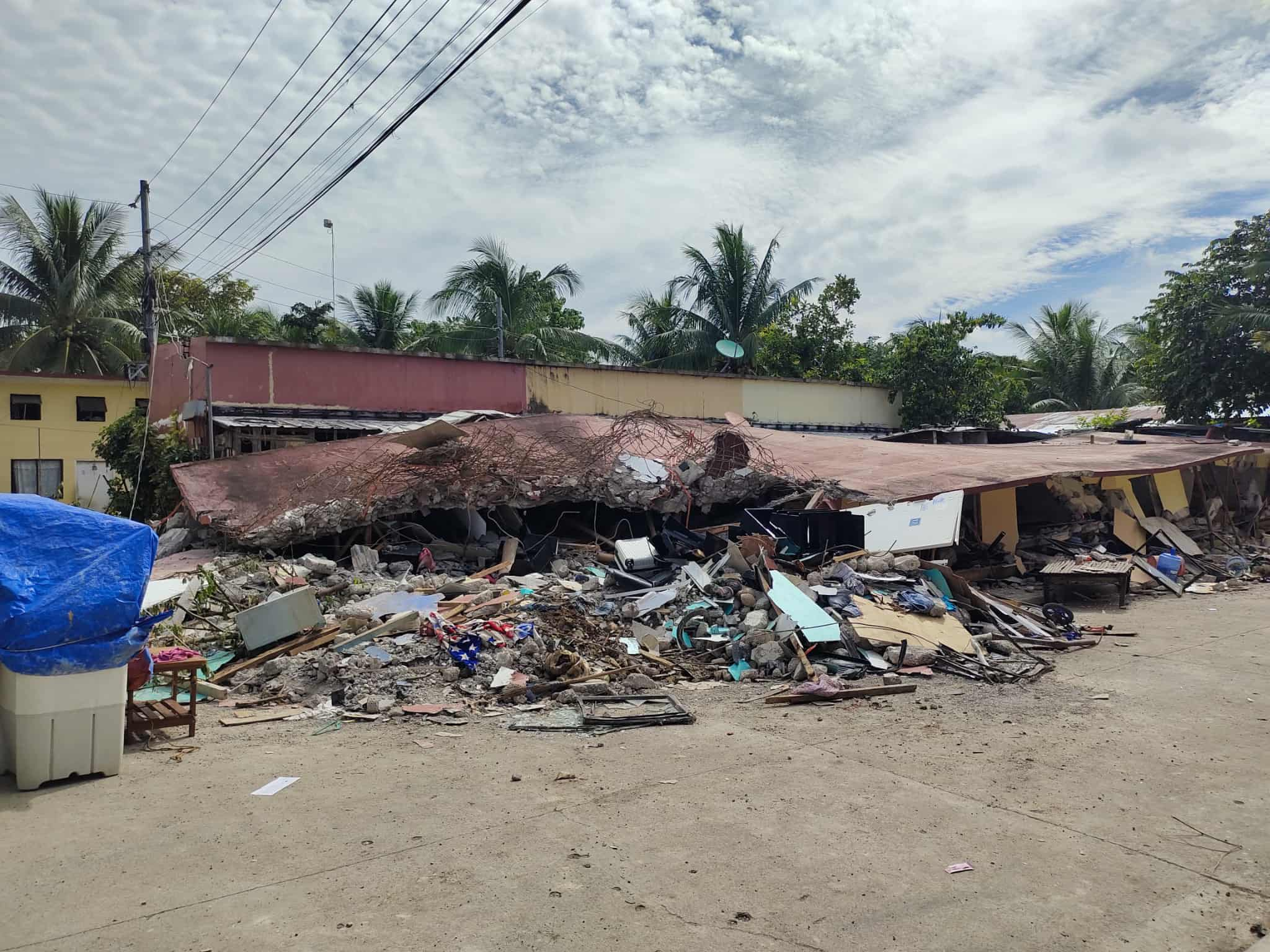
- A village built for Typhoon Haiyan (Yolanda) survivors in Bogo was severely damaged by the earthquake.

- Location within Visayas Location within Philippines
- UTC time: 2025-09-30 13:59:43
- ISC event: 644215443
- USGS-ANSS: ComCat
- Local date: September 30, 2025
- Local time: 21:59:43 PHT (UTC+8)
- Duration: 30 seconds
- Magnitude: M_{w} 6.9
- Depth: 10 km (6.2 mi) (USGS) 5 km (3.1 mi) (PHIVOLCS)
- Epicenter: 11.134°N 124.144°E
- Fault: Bogo Bay Fault
- Areas affected: Visayas, Philippines
- Total damage: ₱733.34 million (US$14.89 million)
- Max. intensity: MMI IX (PEIS VIII)
- Aftershocks: 13,584+ ≥M_{w}1.0; M_{w} 5.8 on October 13, 2025 (strongest)
- Casualties: 79 deaths, 599 injuries

On September 30, 2025, at 21:59:43 PHT (13:59:43 UTC), an earthquake with a magnitude of 6.9 on the moment magnitude scale (M_{w}) struck the Visayas archipelago in the Philippines. It was the strongest earthquake ever recorded in northern Cebu and the deadliest in the country since 2013, with its epicenter located off the coast of Cebu Province in the Central Visayas region. The earthquake was felt in all of Central Visayas while also felt in some areas of Western Visayas, Eastern Visayas, Mindanao and Southern Luzon (particularly Bicol). Thousands of aftershocks were recorded. PHIVOLCS confirmed that the newly named Bogo Bay Fault was the source of the earthquake after documenting surface ruptures and fault scarps in Bogo. Numerous buildings, including churches and hospitals, were damaged, with destruction reported as far away as Cebu City. Tsunami advisories were issued, widespread power outages occurred, and landslides caused additional damage. In response, schools were closed in several parts of the Visayas. The government deployed response teams to support relief efforts. Following the earthquake, many countries expressed their readiness to assist the Philippines. Eleven days after the Cebu earthquake, another pair of earthquakes struck eastern Mindanao; however, it was determined that the two events were unrelated.

As of October 24, 2025, the Philippines' National Disaster Risk Reduction and Management Council (NDRRMC) reported 79 deaths, 599 injuries, and at least ₱733.34 million (US$14.89 million) in infrastructure damage. A total of 160,662 houses were damaged, of which 7,410 were completely destroyed.

== Tectonic setting ==
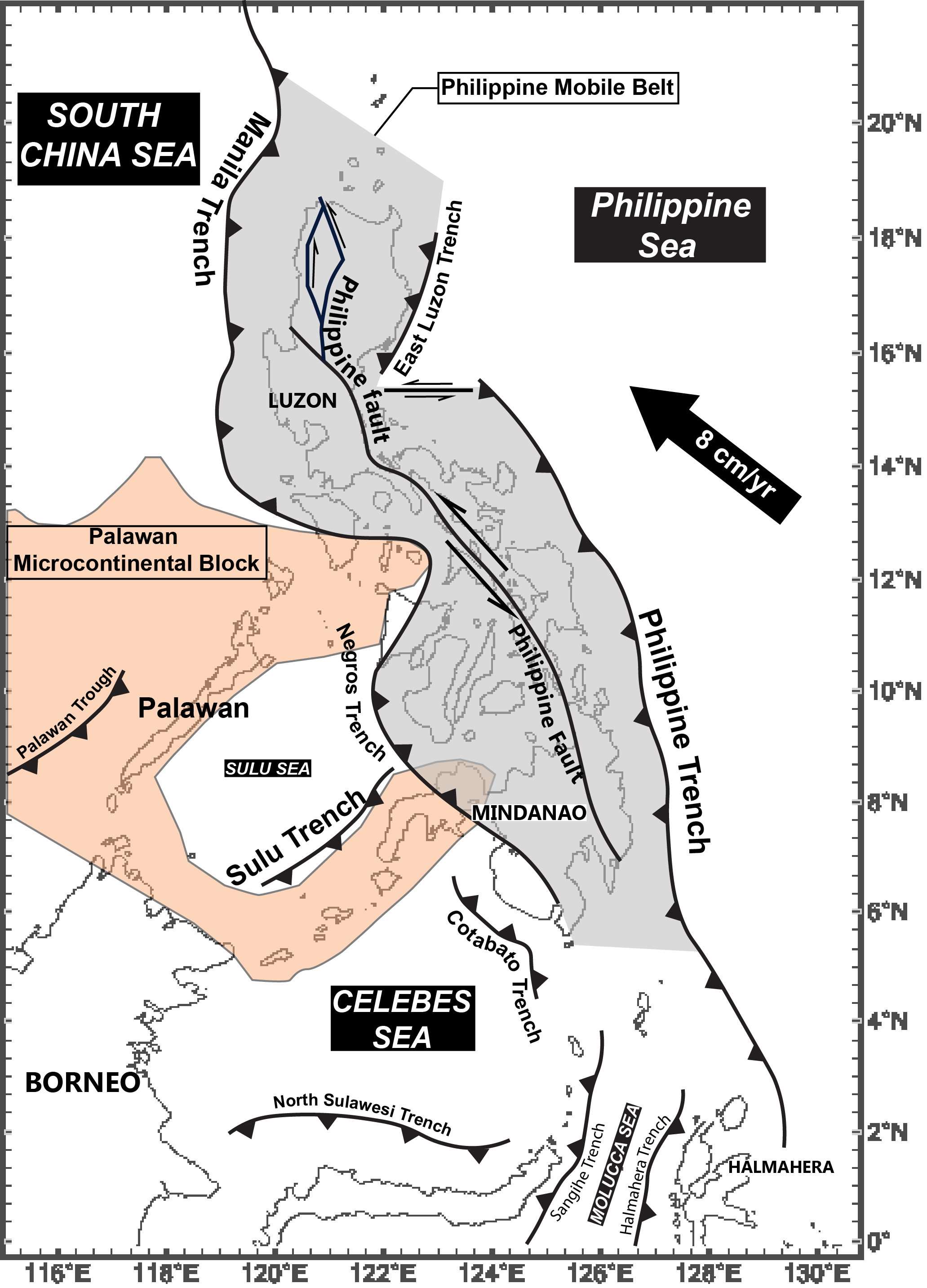
A tectonic diagram showing the Philippine Fault System

The Philippine Islands are situated within a highly deformed zone between the convergent boundary of the Eurasian and Philippine Sea plates, known as the Philippine Mobile Belt (PMB). Along the east, the Philippine Sea plate subducts beneath the islands at the Philippine and East Luzon trenches. Major subduction complexes are also active along the southwestern coast of Mindanao at the Cotabato Trench and along the Manila Trench of western Luzon.

Running through the PMB is the Philippine fault system; a large, 1,200-kilometer-long, highly segmented strike-slip fault system. This left-lateral system of faults runs from southeastern Mindanao to northwestern Luzon. Strike-slip deformation within the PMB occurs as a result of oblique subduction of the Philippine Sea plate, where the Philippine fault system accommodates much of it. The PMB has numerous subduction zones which dip either west or east depending on the location.

In the center of the PMB is the Visayas archipelago, bounded in the west by the Negros Trench and the Mindoro Collision Zone. Mesozoic and sedimentary formations are exposed but are unbearably covered by Paleogene and Neogene formations. These sedimentary formations are then covered by Plio-Pleistocene rocks. A large portion of these formations become an anticlinorium directed NNE, originating from multiple tectonic events. Rock units in central Cebu are divided into three units which are divided by shear zones trending NE. Three of these shear zones are identified as possible faults, particularly the Uling-Masaba Fault, Lutac-Jaclupan Fault, and an unnamed fault.

PHIVOLCS reported that between 1885 and 2013, Cebu and nearby provinces experienced at least eight strong earthquakes with magnitudes from M5.0 to M7.2, including ones recorded in 2012 and 2013. Cebu was not known to be as seismically active as other regions in central Philippines as there were barely any known faults which have generated earthquakes.

== Earthquake ==
The earthquake struck at 21:59:43 PHT (13:59:43 UTC), on September 30, with an epicenter that was located 12 km (7.5 mi) off the eastern coast of Daanbantayan in Cebu Province, Central Visayas. It was initially reported at a moment magnitude (M_{w}) of 6.7 by the Philippine Institute of Volcanology and Seismology (PHIVOLCS), before being revised to M_{w} 6.9, as reported by the United States Geological Survey (USGS). PHIVOLCS reported that the earthquake's depth was 5 km (3.1 mi), while the USGS reported it at 10 km (6.2 mi).

Analysis suggests that the 2025 event occurred in a region that had accumulated pressure from the 2017 Leyte earthquake. PHIVOLCS described the event as the strongest earthquake ever recorded in northern Cebu.

=== Bogo Bay Fault ===
Bogo Bay Fault
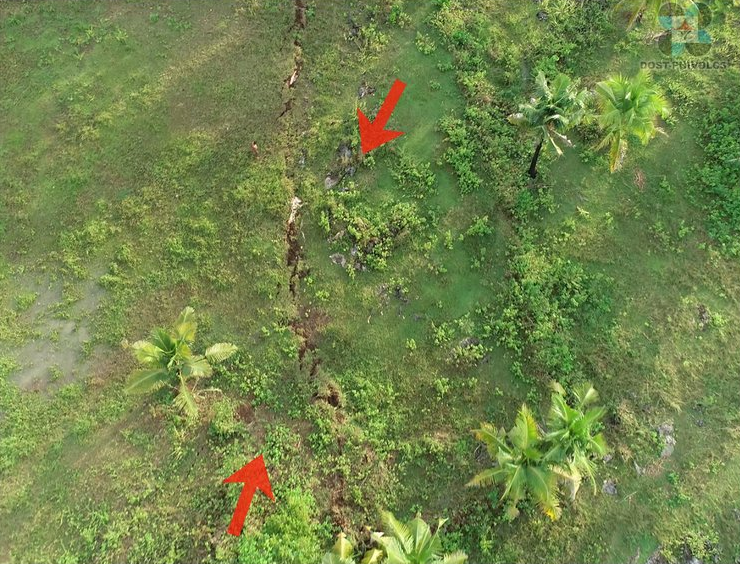
- Arrows point to the trace of the fault

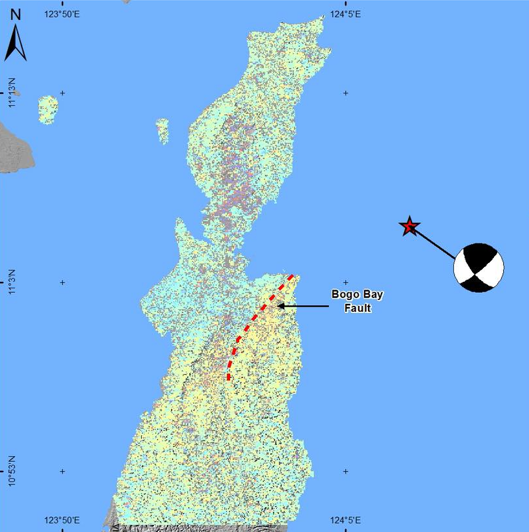
- Map of the Bogo Bay Fault showing the surface rupture
- Named by: PHIVOLCS
- Year defined: 2025
- Country: Philippines
- Region: Central Visayas

Characteristics
- Length: 1.5 km (0.93 mi)

Tectonics
- Status: Active
- Earthquakes: 2025
- Type: Strike-slip fault
- Movement: Dextral

On October 1, PHIVOLCS identified the fault that caused the earthquake. It was previously unnamed and rarely detected due to its underwater location, and it had not shown any significant movement for more than 400 years. PHIVOLCS stated that even though minor earthquakes with magnitudes below 4.5 were recorded in the area, they were too weak to indicate the presence of a fault that could cause an earthquake. On October 3, PHIVOLCS confirmed that the newly named Bogo Bay Fault was the source of the earthquake, after its Quick Response Team documented surface ruptures and fault scarps in Bogo.

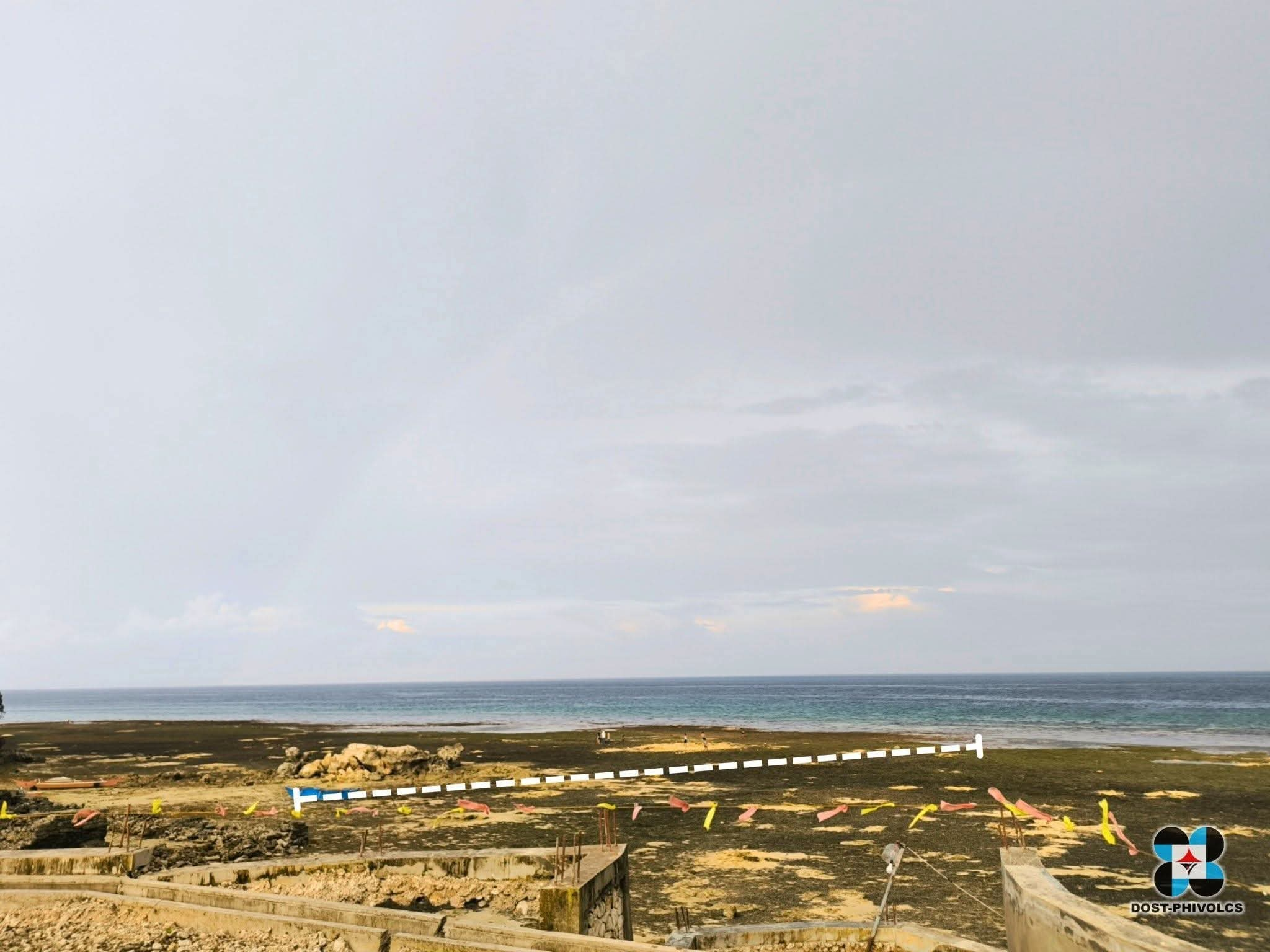
Coastal uplift caused by the earthquake in Barangay Nailon, Bogo, Cebu

PHIVOLCS reported that its drone surveys revealed the fault may extend up to 1.5 km (0.93 mi), adding that the fault appeared to have moved in a right-lateral manner. PHIVOLCS also reported fissures and minor pressure mounds within a 2 m (6 ft 7 in) wide deformation area in Sitio Looc, Barangay Nailon, Bogo. Similarly, Mario Aurelio, the head of a quick response team formed by University of the Philippines, suggested that there could be an underwater rupture measuring up to 35 km (22 mi) long beneath the Camotes Sea northeast of Bogo and under the Tañon Strait southwest of San Remigio.

PHIVOLCS subsequently recommended avoiding the construction of structures at a distance of 5 m (16 ft) from the fault line and the evacuation of 44 houses along the fault line in three barangays of Bogo. PHIVOLCS reported that the fault movement caused about 1 m (3 ft 3 in) of coastal uplift in Barangay Nailon, as shown by the exposed tidal flats and raised tidal notches. At the same time, coastal subsidence was observed at Barangay Hagnaya, San Remigio, where the northeastern portion of Hagnaya Port became inundated by seawater during high tide.

=== Seismic intensity ===
A USGS ShakeMap showing the earthquake's intensity

A maximum Modified Mercalli intensity of IX (Violent) was estimated by the USGS; according to their Prompt Assessment of Global Earthquakes for Response service, approximately 47,000 people were within the zone of intensity IX, in multiple barangays of Bogo, Daanbantayan and Medellin, with 318,000 others in Tabogon, Borbon and San Remigio exposed to MMI VIII (Severe) shaking. An additional three million people were exposed to VI-VII (Strong-Very strong) shaking in Cebu, Leyte, Masbate and Negros Occidental provinces; MMI VI was felt in Cebu City. MMI V (Moderate) shaking was felt by about 11.27 million people across the Visayas and nearby areas, including Iloilo, Bacolod, Samar, Bohol and Roxas City. The earthquake was felt as far away as Quezon in Luzon and Davao del Sur in Mindanao. On the PHIVOLCS earthquake intensity scale, a maximum intensity of VII (Destructive) was felt in at Daanbantayan, Bogo, Medellin, Tabogon, Tabuelan, and San Remigio. Shaking in areas near the epicenter lasted approximately 30 seconds.

PEIS reported intensities
| Intensity Scales | Location |
|---|---|
| VII | Bogo, Daanbantayan, Medellin, San Remigio, and Tabuelan, Cebu; Cebu City |
| VI | Murcia, Negros Occidental; Bantayan, Borbon, Catmon, and Sogod, Cebu |
| V | Cataingan, Esperanza, and Pio V. Corpus, Masbate; Cadiz, Hinigaran, Moises Padilla, San Carlos, San Enrique, Sipalay, and Toboso, Negros Occidental; Dauis, Tagbilaran, and Talibon, Bohol; Alcoy, Argao, Asturias, Carmen, Compostela, Consolacion, Dalaguete, Danao, Liloan, Oslob, Samboan, San Fernando, and Santander, Cebu; Lapu-Lapu City; Almeria, Biliran, Cabucgayan, Caibiran, Culaba, Kawayan, Maripipi, and Naval, Biliran; Abuyog, Alangalang, Albuera, Babatngon, Barugo, Bato, Baybay, Burauen, Calubian, Capoocan, Carigara, Dagami, Dulag, Hilongos, Hindang, Inopacan, Isabel, Jaro, Javier, Julita, Kananga, La Paz, Leyte, Macarthur, Matag-ob, Matalom, Mayorga, Merida, Palo, Palompon, Pastrana, San Isidro, San Miguel, Santa Fe, Tabango, Tabontabon, Tanauan, Tolosa, Tunga, and Villaba, Leyte; Ormoc; Tacloban |
| IV | Ligao, Albay; Dimasalang, Mandaon, Masbate City, Milagros, Monreal, Palanas, San Fernando, and San Jacinto, Masbate; Bulan, Bulusan, Casiguran, Irosin, Magallanes, and Pilar, Sorsogon; Dao, Roxas City, and Sigma, Capiz; Leganes, Iloilo; Bago, Himamaylan, Ilog, and Kabankalan, Negros Occidental; Ubay, Bohol; Amlan, Bacong, Bais, Bayawan, Dauin, San Jose, Santa Catalina, Tanjay, Dumaguete and Zamboanguita, Negros Oriental; Arteche, Borongan, Can-avid, Dolores, General Macarthur, Guiuan, Hernani, Lawaan, Mercedes, Oras, Salcedo, San Julian, Sulat, and Taft, Eastern Samar; Mahaplag, Leyte; Allen, Bobon, Catarman, Catubig, Gamay, Laoang, Lapinig, Lope De Vega, Mapanas, Mondragon, Palapag, Pambujan, Rosario, San Antonio, San Roque, and Victoria, Northern Samar; Almagro, Calbayog, Catbalogan, Marabut, San Jorge, and Tagapul-an, Samar; Anahawan, Bontoc, Hinunangan, Hinundayan, Libagon, Liloan, Limasawa, Maasin, Macrohon, Malitbog, Padre Burgos, Pintuyan, Saint Bernard, San Francisco, San Juan, San Ricardo, Silago, Sogod, and Tomas Oppus, Southern Leyte; Dipolog, Zamboanga del Norte; Mambajao, Camiguin |

=== Aftershocks ===
By October 21, 2025, at least 13,584 aftershocks were recorded, the strongest being a M_{w}5.8 event at 01:05 PHT on October 13. The aftershocks were recorded at magnitudes of 1.0–5.8, with 71 of them being felt.

== Impact ==
Directorate-General for European Civil Protection and Humanitarian Aid Operations (DG ECHO) daily situation map for Central Visayas on October 1

As of November 12, 2025, the Department of Social Welfare and Development (DSWD) reported that 753,317 people across Central and Eastern Visayas were affected. Additionally, 185,888 houses were damaged, of which 10,566 were destroyed. The Visayan Electric Company reported power outages in some areas. The National Grid Corporation of the Philippines (NGCP) said that the earthquake disconnected Leyte, Samar, and parts of Bohol from the Cebu-Negros-Panay grid. It also recorded damage to its Daanbantayan Substation and the tripping of four 230k V transmission lines in the Visayas. Twenty-seven power stations failed, resulting in power outages that affected 819,843 consumers across 309 municipalities. Business operations in the Philippines were disrupted when the Cebu IT Park was evacuated. Power outages also occurred in Iloilo City.

Multiple sinkholes appeared in Daanbantayan and Medellin following the earthquake. At least 100 sinkholes were discovered in San Remigio alone while 16 appeared in Bogo.

On October 13, a magnitude 5.8 aftershock hit San Remigio, injuring 14 people. A road cracked in San Remigio, while a water tank fell on a house in Santa Fe. Power outages occurred in Bogo, while several houses in the city that had been damaged by the mainshock collapsed. A fish kill also occurred in Bogo.

=== Damage ===
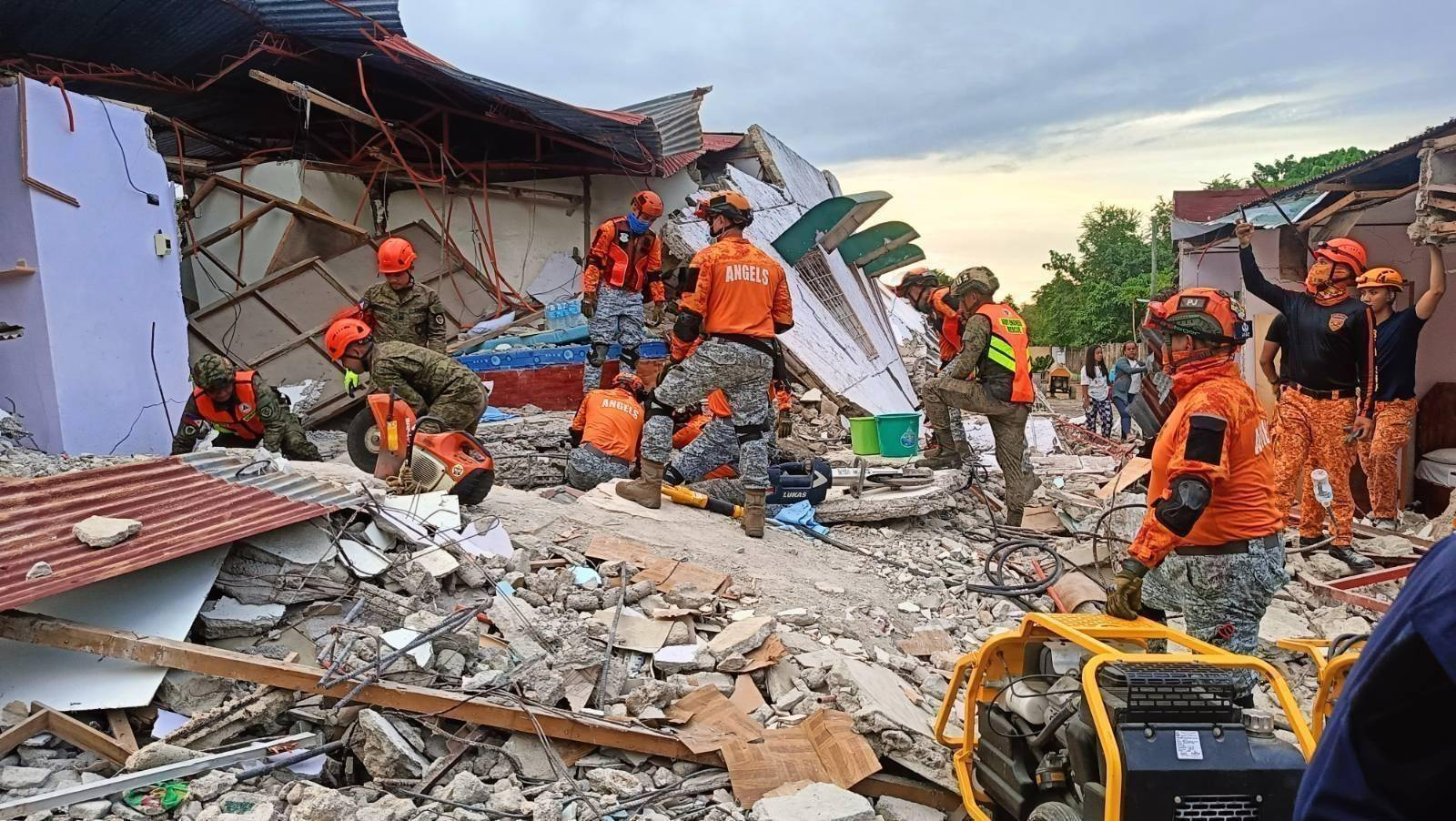
The Philippine Army and the Bureau of Fire Protection joined the rescue efforts

As of October 24, 2025, the National Disaster Risk Reduction and Management Council (NDRRMC) estimated that at least ₱733.34 million (US$14.89 million) worth of infrastructure had been damaged. Collapsed structures include the Archdiocesan Shrine of Santa Rosa de Lima church in Daanbantayan and a bridge in San Remigio. Some 5,587 classrooms sustained minor damage, 803 sustained major damage, and 1,187 were destroyed, with more than 19,000 students and 950 teachers and staff affected. Four police stations were damaged. More than 140 heritage and tourism sites were damaged, affecting more than 2,000 workers in the tourism sector. Around 339 guests were evacuated from the Nustar Resort and Casino in Cebu City after its canopy collapsed and walls cracked. A total of 959 infrastructures were damaged due to the earthquake, including 11 road sections and 25 bridges. At least three seaports were non-operational, stranding at least 214 passengers. Around ₱373 million (US$7.57 million) of damage was recorded in Cebu's fishing industry, while agricultural damages in the province reached ₱170.9 million (US$3.47 million). The Department of Education said 2,787 schools in three regions were damaged, with 1,631 of them in Central Visayas alone, while 1,736 students and 227 teachers were injured. It valued the amount of damage at ₱12.69 billion (US$257.66 million).

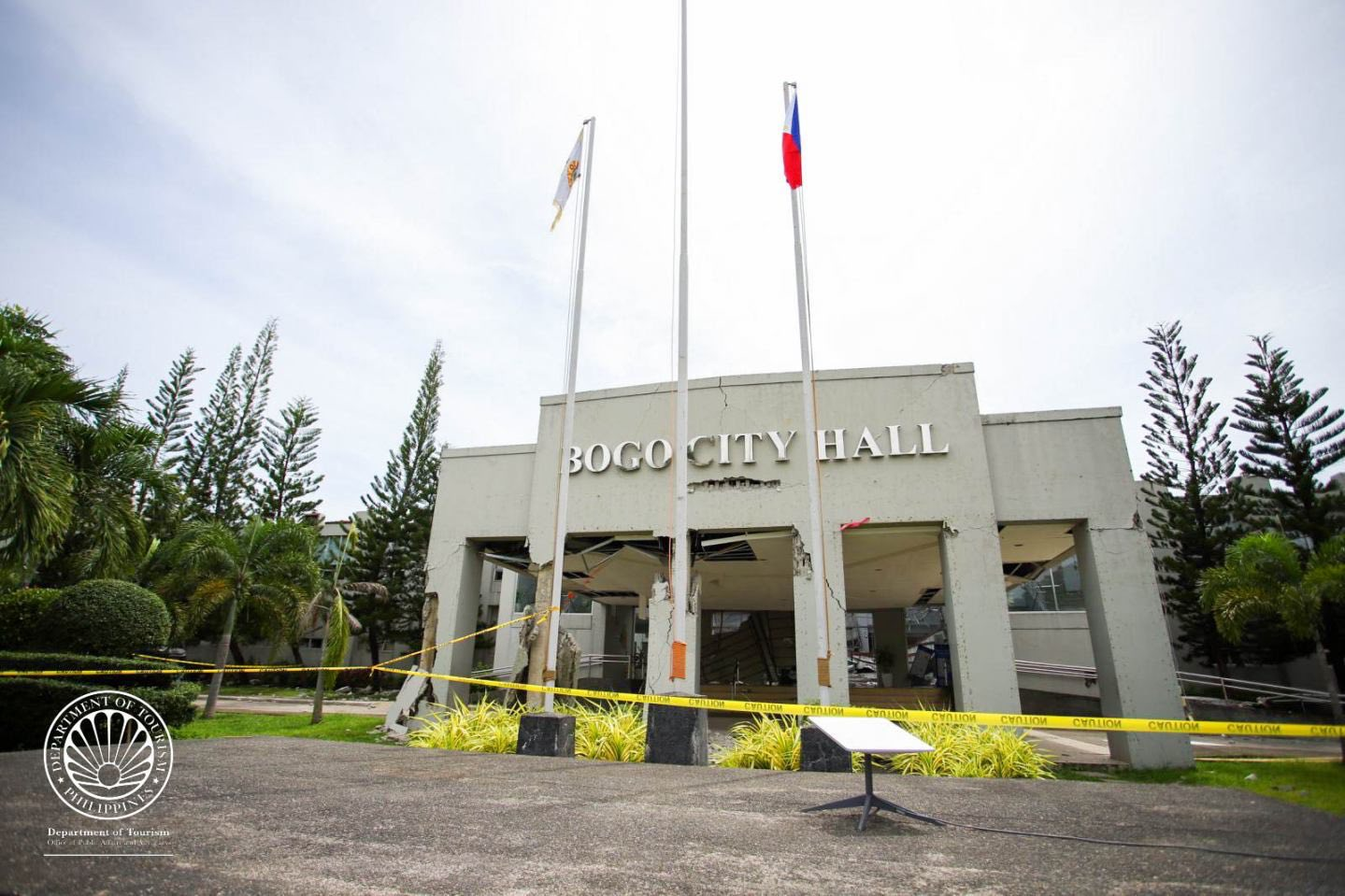
The Bogo City Hall was damaged by the earthquake

Many roads in Bogo were seriously damaged, along with Cebu Provincial Hospital and the Archdiocesan Shrine and Parish Church of St. Vicente Ferrer. All 38 schools in the city were damaged, with two of them destroyed. More than half of the 20,000 tombs in the Corazon Cemetery were also damaged. Five 19th-century churches made of coral stone in Daanbantayan, Bantayan, Tabogon, San Remigio and Bogo were damaged, while other churches in Medellin, Borbon and Tabuelan collapsed or were damaged. Numerous roads in Tabuelan were damaged. A McDonald's restaurant collapsed, which is permanently closed as of 2026. One bridge in Tabogon, four bridges in Tuburan, and one road in Daanbantayan were destroyed. Housing facilities like SM Cares Housing and Condor Lodge in Bogo also collapsed. A landslide was triggered in Tabuelan while a fire broke out in SM Consolacion. The San Juan Nepomuceno Parish Church in San Remigio, which was built in 1854, was declared unusable after sustaining severe damage, along with the discovery of sinkholes and cavities beneath its flooring.

In Ormoc, the city's Superdome partially collapsed. The earthquake triggered a landslide in Villaba, Leyte, blocking a main road and disrupting local transportation. Twenty homes collapsed in the town. Another landslide occurred and a bridge was damaged in the town of Leyte. In Naval, Biliran, a gym sustained damage. Many buildings were damaged in Cebu City, including the city hall, Fort San Pedro and a shopping mall which suffered a collapsed ceiling. Severe water scarcity occurred in San Remigio and Medellin after municipal water systems were damaged. Six school handwashing facilities were damaged. The San Pedro Apóstol church in Bantayan faced heavy damage on its facade. The Daanbantayan substation was damaged, causing the municipality to suffer heavy power loss. The port of Medellin was partially damaged, while a seaport in Bogo and a wall at the city's fire station collapsed. In Mandaue, an ammonia leakage occurred at the San Miguel Brewery, while the city's public market, which had been built to replace a previous market destroyed in the 2013 Bohol earthquake, sustained a partially collapsed canopy and three cracked columns. The port of Tabogon was severely damaged along with the Nipa Bridge connecting the town with Borbon.

=== Casualties ===
The NDRRMC reported that at least 79 people were killed in the earthquake. In addition, 599 people were injured. It was the deadliest earthquake in the country since 2013.

== Response and aftermath ==
Schools were ordered closed in Negros Occidental and in Mandaue, Lapu-Lapu City, Talisay, Danao, Minglanilla, Consolacion, Carmen, Liloan, Compostela and Barili in Cebu on October 1. Classes in Cebu City were suspended as a precautionary measure. Government work at the Iloilo Provincial Capitol was suspended to allow for an assessment of the building's structural integrity. In Tagbilaran, Bohol, government work was also suspended, except for the city's earthquake quick response team. The municipality of San Remigio announced its intention to declare a state of calamity in order to expedite response and relief operations. Cebu was placed in a state of calamity.

Medical teams from the Cebu South Medical Center and other organizations were deployed to areas affected by the earthquake. In Bogo, residents lay in tents while charging their phones using generators, according to Rappler correspondent John Sitchon. Sitchon called the aftermath reminiscent of Typhoon Rai (Odette). The earthquake, along with Typhoon Kalmaegi in November, was subsequently attributed by officials as having contributed to the 2026 Binaliw landslide in Cebu City in January by destabilizing the structural integrity of the Binaliw landfill.

=== Local ===
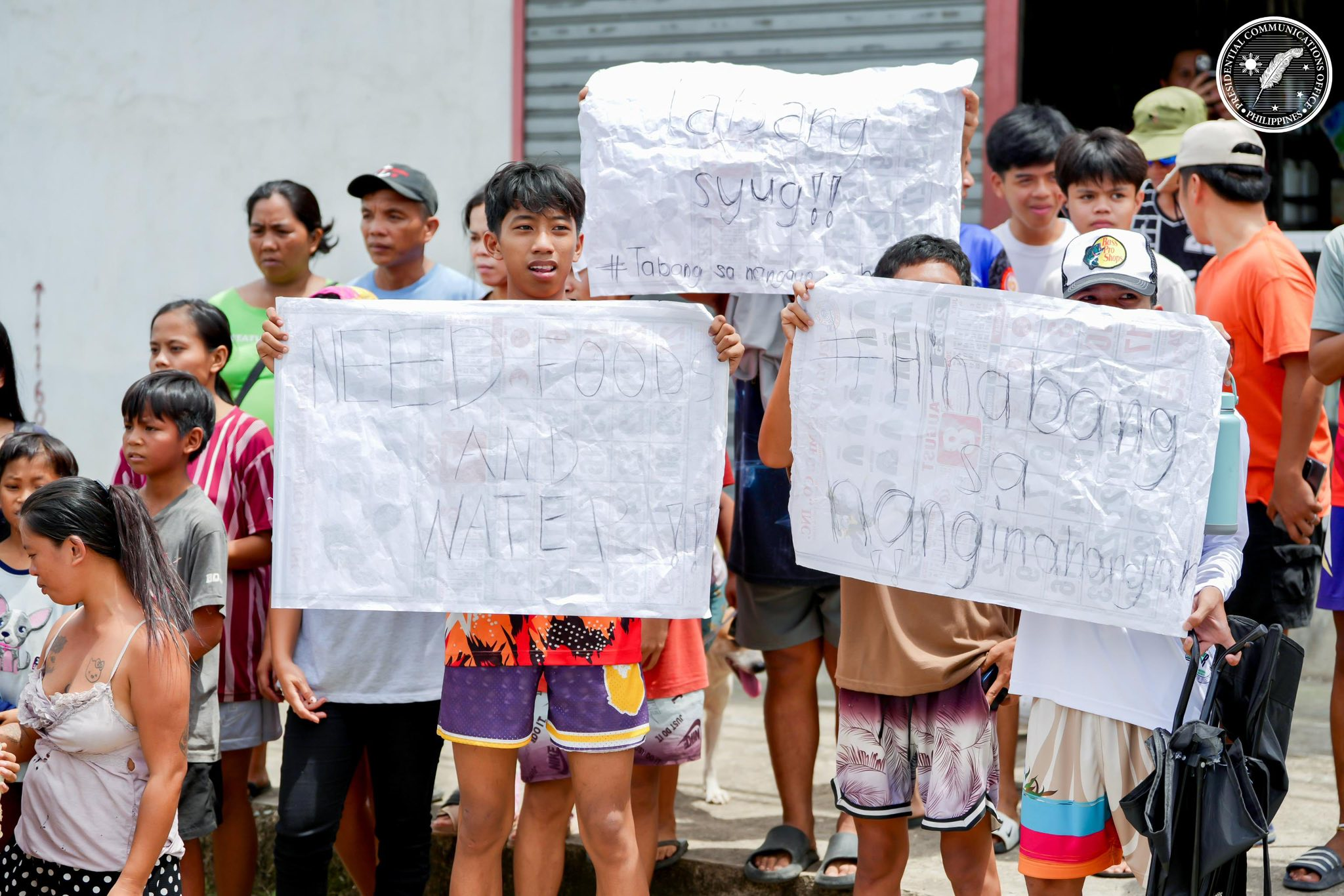
The victims of the Cebu earthquake pose holding a sign

The Archdiocese of Cebu, under its new Archbishop Alberto Uy – whose formal installation occurred just a few hours before the earthquake struck – halted church use in earthquake-hit areas and ordered structural assessments of all churches and rectories. Cebu Governor Pam Baricuatro urged residents in Cebu to "stay calm and move to open areas" in a live video message in her Facebook account. A trauma team was formed by the Vicente Sotto Memorial Medical Center, which issued an appeal for blood donations after its supplies ran low. Contestants of the Miss Asia Pacific International pageant, whose gala night was interrupted by the earthquake, sent donations to victims. Actress Kim Chiu sent aid to the victims in her home province of Cebu. The Davao City government sent relief and assistance teams to Cebu province on October 2. Singer Zsa Zsa Padilla provided food and financial assistance to the victims of the earthquake. Bini member and Cebu native Aiah Arceta, through her outreach project "Aiahdvocacy", organized a donation drive and collected more than ₱440,000 (US$8,934.01).

The provincial government of Ilocos Norte donated boxes of relief goods to earthquake victims, the Zamboanga City government sent a team on a humanitarian mission to Cebu, and the city government of Pasig will mobilize five teams, including a search and rescue unit, to assist areas affected by the earthquake. The Quezon City government mobilized its resources to assist Cebu residents and will also provide ₱10 million (US$203,045.69) in financial assistance. The Bangsamoro government and its partners provided welfare packages to the victims.

The Mactan–Cebu International Airport was temporarily evacuated for assessment and experienced a power outage. A flight arriving at Bacolod–Silay Airport was delayed for 30 minutes due to inspections on the runway. Fishing communities faced livelihood problems. A ban on trucks travelling on national and provincial roads in Cebu was lifted for the duration of the province's state of calamity declaration to allow for faster delivery of aid. 3,000 residents, mostly young people, volunteered to help relief efforts by packing goods in the Cebu Provincial Capitol although they could not venture into the hardest-hit towns by themselves. Around 1,025 evacuation centers were established. In Medellin, some residents were forced to sleep in plastic bags due to rain and lack of tents. The Office of Civil Defense advised against private groups carrying aid from driving to northern Cebu due to the risk of aftershocks and traffic congestion affecting emergency responses and operations. The Cebu provincial government established a donation hub in Danao. At least 13 injuries occurred as a result of road accidents involving vehicles transporting aid to northern Cebu. In Medellin, 12 members of the same family were rescued after attempting suicide due to psychological trauma caused by the earthquake. Local authorities ordered a forced evacuation in Barangay Tagbubunga, Villaba, Leyte, following reports of ground cracks and rockfall hazards. Around 200 families were relocated to safer areas as a precaution.

Following the earthquake, a complaint was filed by the BPO Industry Employees Network against 30 BPO companies in Cebu for violations of labor and occupational safety laws during the earthquake, including blocked office exits, forcing employees to work almost immediately following the shaking and the suspension of those who refused to do so. The Department of Labor and Employment subsequently issued a cease and desist order to one BPO firm for lacking disaster response plans during natural calamities.

=== Domestic ===
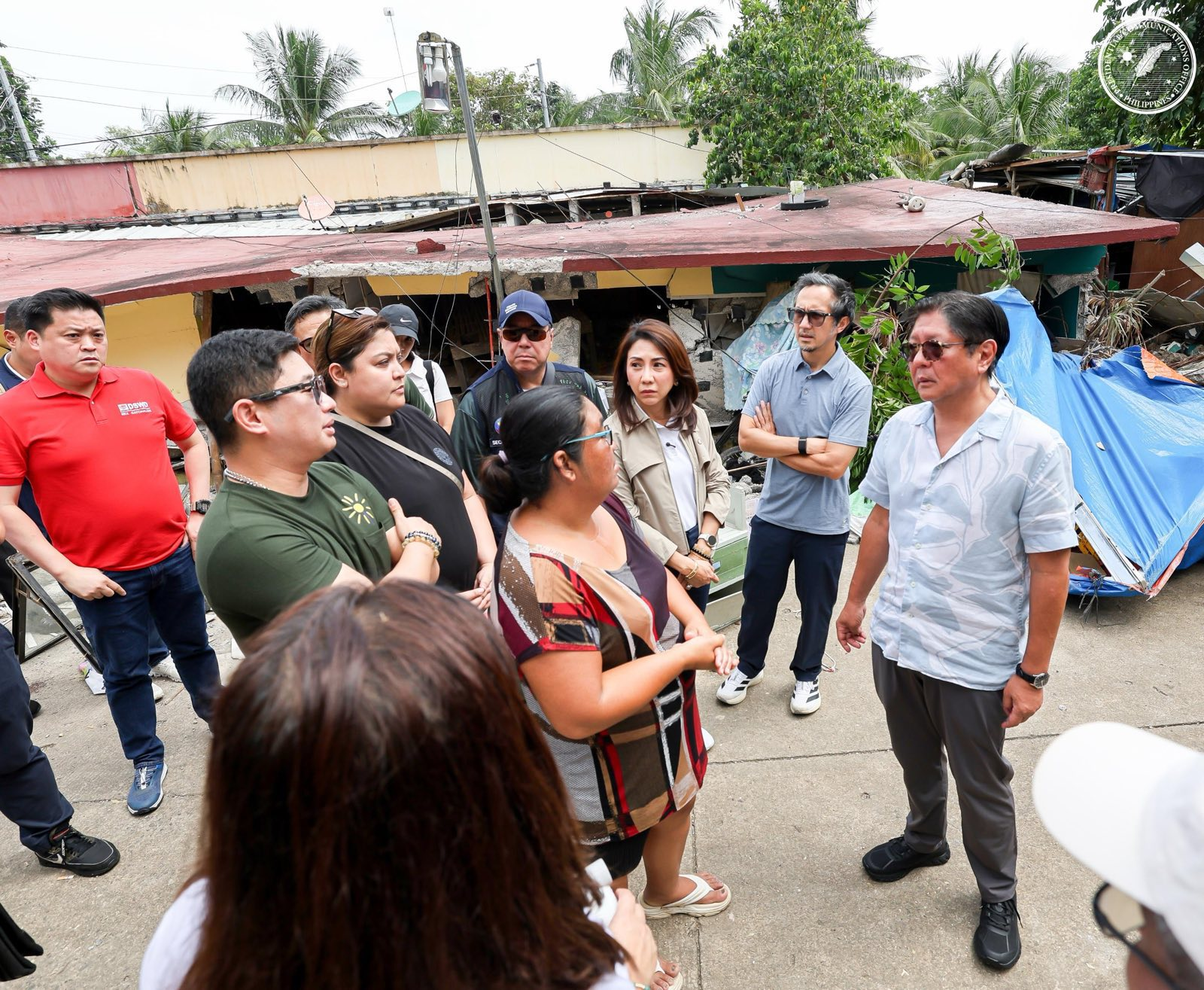
President Bongbong Marcos visited the earthquake-affected areas in Bogo, Cebu

President Bongbong Marcos urged government agencies to move quickly and provide urgent aid to the affected communities. On October 2, he arrived in Cebu and visited the Yolanda Housing Village in Barangay Palumbato, which was used as a relocation site for survivors of Typhoon Haiyan (Yolanda). Marcos announced that his office had donated over ₱200 million (US$4.06 million) to the cities and municipalities of Cebu after the earthquake, and that the Office of the President would also provide ₱5 million (US$101,522.84) each to province-owned hospitals.

Marcos pledged to restore damaged structures and heritage sites, and ordered that electricity and other essential services in Cebu be fully restored within two days. He also instructed the construction of a "tent city" in Bogo to provide temporary shelter for displaced residents. He directed the Department of Budget and Management to allocate ₱150 million (US$3.05 million) from the Local Government Support Fund to the Cebu provincial government, and ₱75 million (US$1.52 million) each to the local governments of San Remigio, Bogo, and Medellin. Marcos assured that all earthquake victims who were injured or need hospital care would be covered by the zero balance billing policy, and announced ₱100,000 (US$2,030.46) aid for those with damaged homes. Seven tent cities were subsequently erected in Daanbantayan, Medellin, San Remigio, and Bogo, sheltering a total of 588 families. The National Housing Authority pledged to relocate more than 2,000 families in Bogo and San Remigio.

Vice President Sara Duterte visited earthquake victims in Cebu to offer her sympathies and assured communities still waiting for aid that her satellite office in Cebu would ensure they receive support. According to the National Disaster Risk Reduction and Management Council (NDRRMC), a state of calamity was declared in 53 cities and municipalities. The Philippine Charity Sweepstakes Office deployed immediate relief operations to assist communities affected by the earthquake. The NGCP placed the Visayas power grid under yellow alert status. The Philippine government launched its ₱20 (US$0.41) per kilogram rice program in Visayas areas affected by the disaster for at least one month.

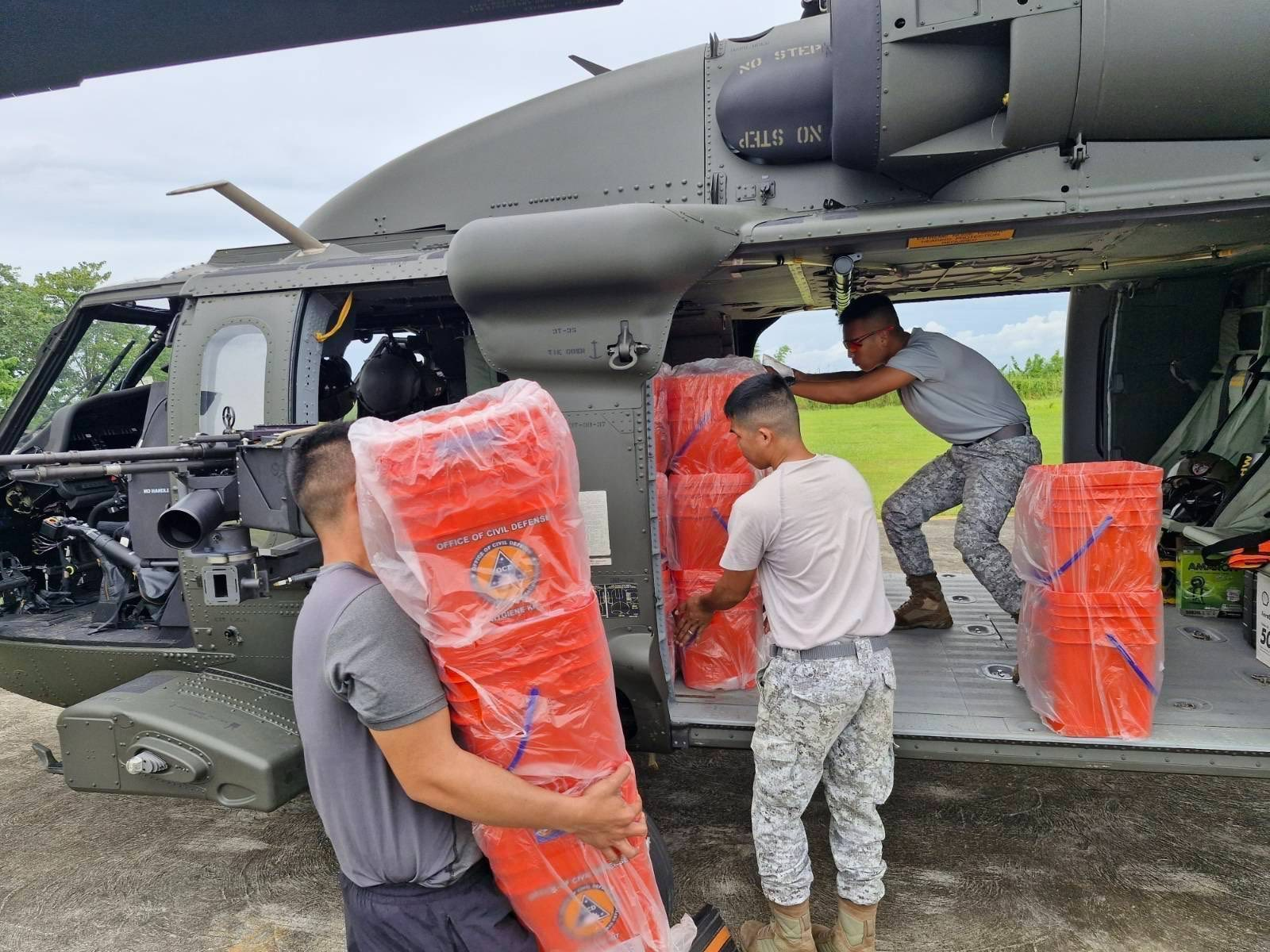
The Philippine Air Force delivered hygiene kits onto a Sikorsky UH-60

PHIVOLCS issued a Tsunami Advisory Minor Sea Level Disturbance following the earthquake at around 22:32 PHT covering the coastal towns of Leyte, Cebu, and Biliran. The advisory was lifted at 01:20 PHT the next day, October 1. On the other hand, the Pacific Tsunami Warning Center did not issue a Pacific-wide tsunami threat.

The Department of Health mobilized special care units among Cebu while initiating a Code White alert. The University of San Carlos launched a donation drive to affected communities. The Girl Scouts of the Philippines, the Cebu Technological University, the Philippine Red Cross and other organizations initiated donation drives. The Metropolitan Manila Development Authority sent a team to Cebu province following President Marcos' directive to mobilize resources and deliver aid to communities affected by the earthquake. The Philippine Coast Guard sent five ships, 10 K9 teams and desalination machines to Cebu. The Armed Forces of the Philippines sent 300 personnel, including signal teams tasked with restoring communication lines. The Philippine Army deployed soldiers to earthquake-hit areas in Cebu, while the Philippine National Police deployed 2,250 personnel. The Philippine Air Force sent two C-130 aircraft to transport humanitarian aid to Mactan–Benito Ebuen Air Base. It also deployed two Sikorsky UH-60 Black Hawk helicopters to transport aid to Carnaza island in Daanbantayan. The Bureau of Customs donated seized contraband items including 1,143 tents and 50 units of mobile power supply. Search and rescue operations ended on October 2 after authorities determined that there were no more missing people, with the focus shifting to delivering aid and relief to the affected areas. The government implemented a 60-day price freeze for basic necessities, liquefied petroleum gas and kerosene.

=== International ===
Following the earthquake, the United States, Canada, Singapore, Malaysia and Indonesia said that they were ready to assist the Philippines. The Special Malaysia Disaster Assistance and Rescue Team (SMART), consisting of a total of 77 members, was deployed to the affected region followed by the dispatchment of an emergency response team from Mercy Malaysia. The Singapore Red Cross (SRC) donated S$50,000 (₱2.2 million (US$44,670.05)) to support affected communities. The European Union also pledged humanitarian aid. The Taipei Economic and Cultural Office (TECO) announced a US$200,000 humanitarian donation. The United Arab Emirates sent emergency assistance to affected communities. Canada pledged CAD$250,000 to the Philippine National Red Cross to be used in operations in Cebu. The Hungarian Embassy in Manila also announced monetary and humanitarian aid through the Hungary Helps Program. The United States provided $1 million in humanitarian aid for victims of the earthquake and Typhoon Kalmaegi, which struck Cebu more than a month later.

== See also ==
- 2012 Negros earthquake
- 2013 Bohol earthquake
- List of earthquakes in 2025
- List of earthquakes in the Philippines
