= Daanbantayan Church =

- Archdiocesan Shrine of Santa Rosa de Lima
- Santa Rosa de Lima Church
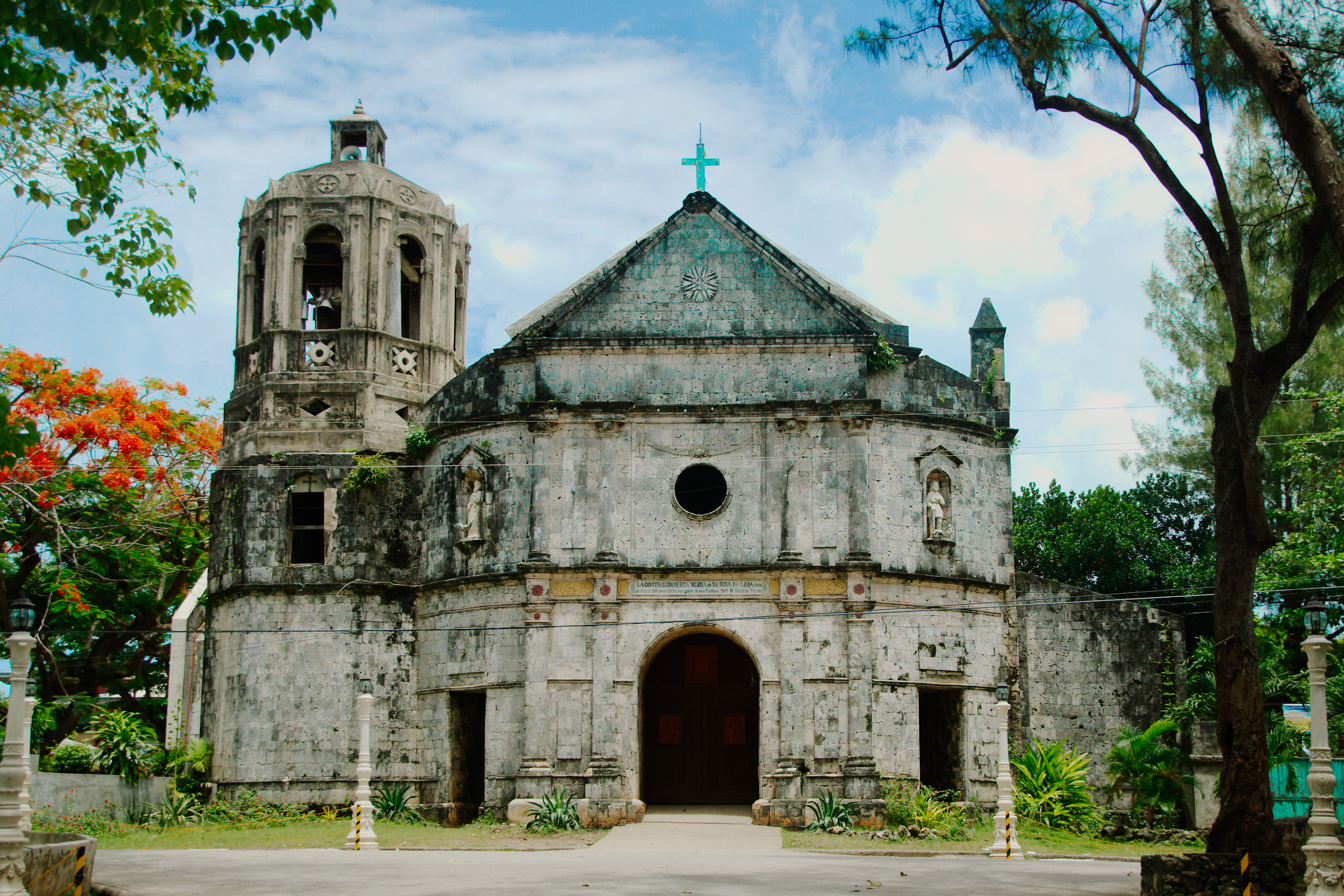
- Church facade in 2012 prior to its destruction in the 2025 Cebu earthquake.
- Location: Daanbantayan, Cebu
- Country: Philippines
- Denomination: Roman Catholic

History
- Former name: St. Rose of Lima Parish
- Dedication: Rose of Lima

Architecture
- Functional status: Ruins
- Completed: 1886

Administration
- Province: Cebu
- Metropolis: Cebu
- Archdiocese: Cebu
- Deanery: Sta. Rosa de Lima

The Daanbantayan Church, officially the Archdiocesan Shrine of Santa Rosa de Lima, was a Roman Catholic church in Daanbantayan, Cebu, Philippines.

== History ==
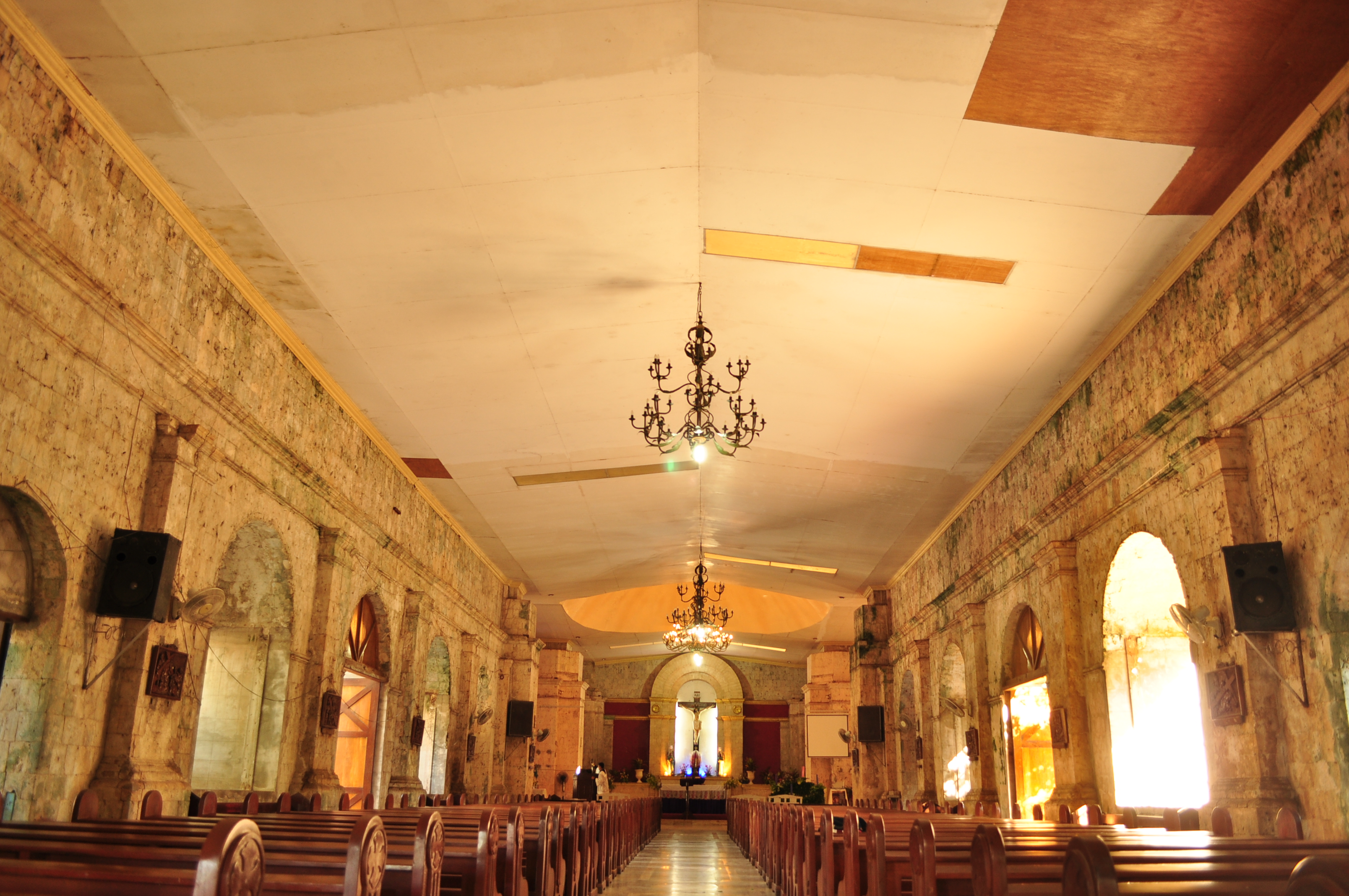
Church interior

A parish was established in the town of Daanbantayan, Cebu on April 10, 1858. This was followed by the erection of the stone building of the Daanbantayan Church in 1886.

On August 30, 2022, the Archdiocese of Cebu elevated the then-parish church into an archdiocesan shrine becoming the first church dedicated to Roman Catholic saint Rose of Lima to have that status.

The Daanbantayan Church was significantly destroyed during the 2025 Cebu earthquake, resulting in the loss of 70 to 80% of its structure. The retable of Rose de Lima survived the earthquake. There are plans to restore the church building.
