= Datu Daya =

Datu Daya was a legendary lord of Kandaya ("Daya's (kingdom)"), the place that is now known as Daanbantayan on the northern tip of Cebu Island in the Philippines.

According to oral tradition, Datu Daya was the ruler of the first settlers in northern Cebu. The new settlers cleared forests and in a few years were able to establish a progressive community. Muslim Moro raiders continually attacked the community and kidnapped women and children until a bantayan (watchtower) was constructed to defend the town. For his glory, Datu Daya was idolized.

== Cultural remnants ==
The town of Daanbantayan, Cebu has an annual celebration of chants and dances known as Haladaya (literally, "a tribute to Daya").

Before the conversion of the district now known as Daanbantayan into a town, it was known as Kandaya (kang Daya - Daya's place in Cebuano).

== See also ==
- History of the Philippines (900-1521)
  - Rajah Humabon
  - Lapulapu
  - Ferdinand Magellan
  - Miguel López de Legazpi
- Cebu
  - Singhapala
  - Cebu (historical polity)
  - Cebu City
