= Malapascua =

Island in the Philippines

Malapascua Island
Isla sa Malapascua
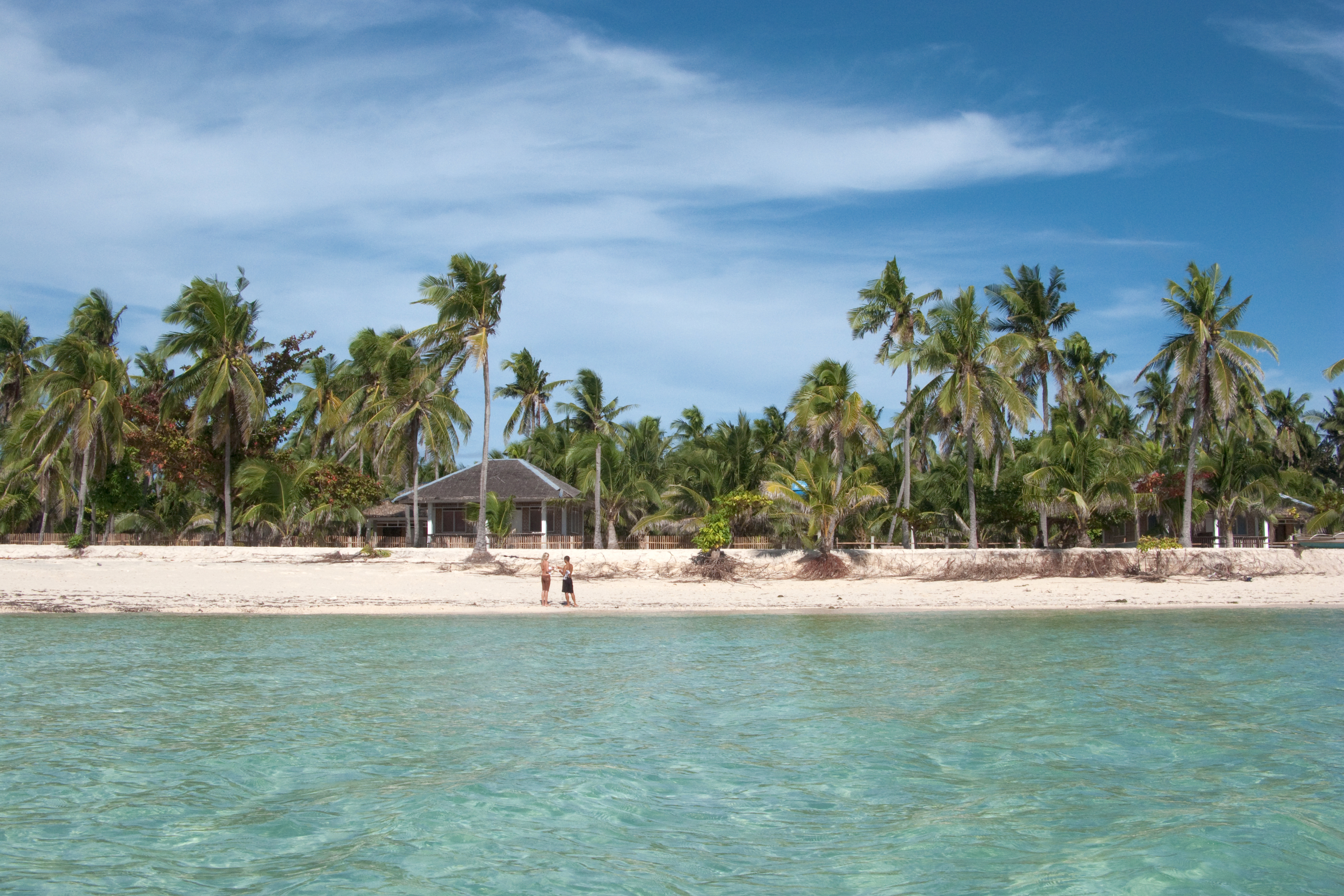
- Malapascua Island, southern end

- Location within Visayas

Geography
- Coordinates: 11°20′05″N 124°06′58″E
- Adjacent to: Visayan Sea
- Area: 1.48 km^{2} (0.57 sq mi)

Administration
- Philippines
- Region: Central Visayas
- Province: Cebu
- Municipality: Daanbantayan
- Barangay: Logon

Demographics
- Population: 6,129 (2024)
- Pop. density: 4,141/km^{2} (10725/sq mi)
- Ethnic groups: Cebuano

Malapascua is a Philippine island situated in the Visayan Sea, 6.8 kilometres (4.2 mi) across a shallow strait from the northernmost tip of Cebu Island. Administratively, it is part of the peninsular barangay of Logon, Daanbantayan, Cebu. Malapascua is a small island, only about 2.5 by 1 kilometre (1.55 by 0.62 mi), and has eight hamlets. According to the latest 2024 census, the island has an estimated population of 6,129.

== Holiday industry ==
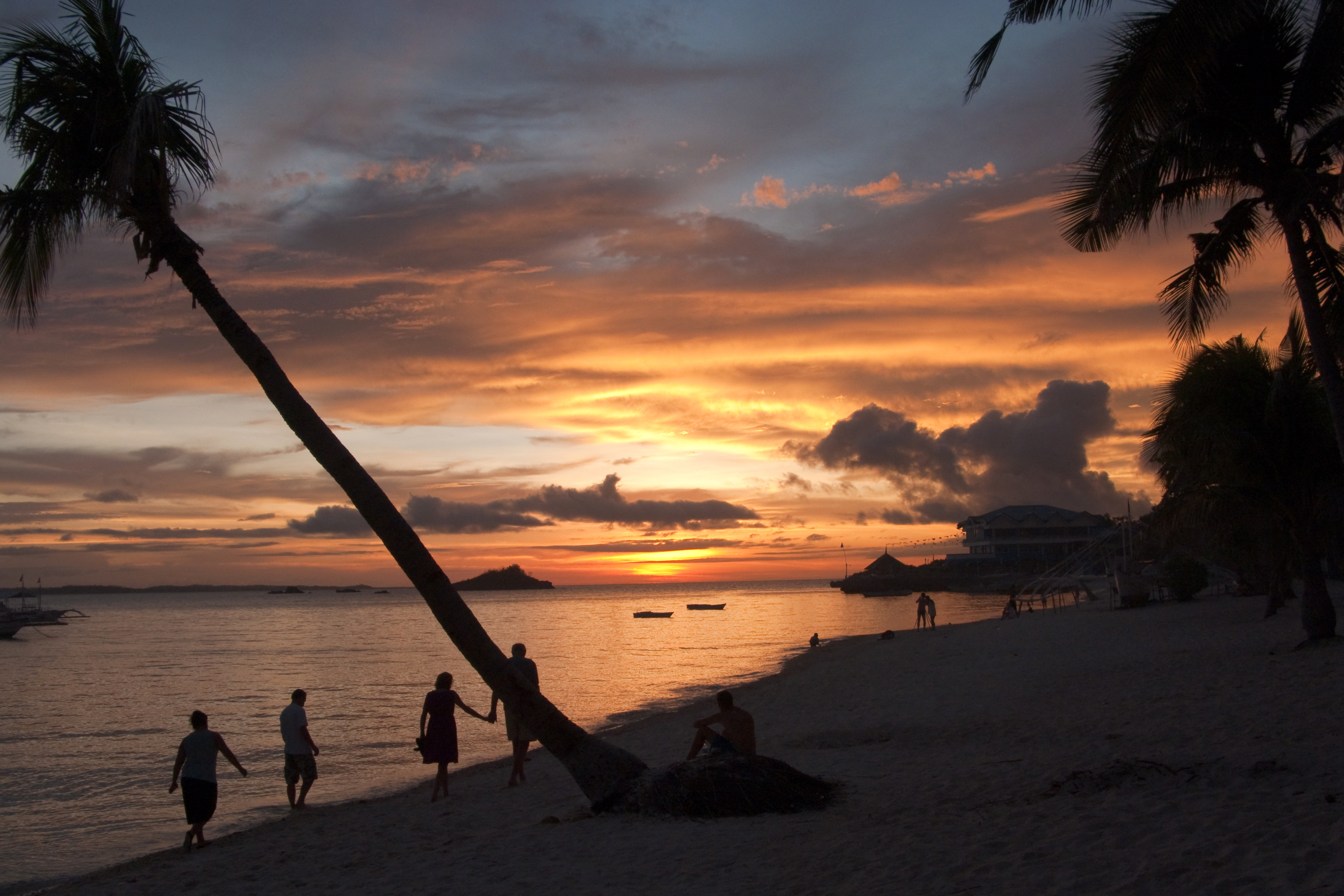
Sunset on Bounty Beach

Malapascua has been popular as a dive destination since the early 1990s. Prior to this, the island was known primarily for its wide white sand beach, Bounty Beach. It features coral gardens, coral walls and excellent local dive spots, as well as further-out sites including Gato Island, Monad Shoal, and Kemod Shoal. Monad Shoal is an underwater plateau where thresher sharks and manta rays can regularly be sighted. Most of the islanders derive their livelihood from tourism, while some still rely on subsistence fishing and farming.

Similar to other islands, natives were dependent on fishing as a source of livelihood. Agricultural products such as corn and rice were supplied from neighboring islands, such as Cebu and Leyte. With the population increasing and fish stocks dwindling, tourism came to the rescue. Nowadays, the majority of islanders either directly or indirectly make a living out of tourism, which is developing rapidly. The growth of tourism has also increased local immigration to the island, thus the demand for housing. The lack of a pier for bigger boats – due to financial constraints – is keeping a brake on construction growth.

== Folklore ==
Malapascua Island or barangay Logon is believed to be the place where the Virgin de los Desamparados made a miracle sometime in 1890 when the island had only nine households of the Monteclar, Deogrades, Rosales, Gulfan, Rubio, Bohol and Bruces families. It was said to be a piece of wood that had never burnt. In 1907 the parish priest of Kandaya, now Daanbantayan town, Rev. Fr. Inocentes Maga, baptized it of its name upon the request of the local residents. The size of the image is not the original size and it is said to be growing until present. Devotees from different parts of the country and even abroad come during the feast days on May 11 and 12. The chapel was originally made of coconut palm and leaves but now it is made of steel and cement.

== Monad Shoal ==
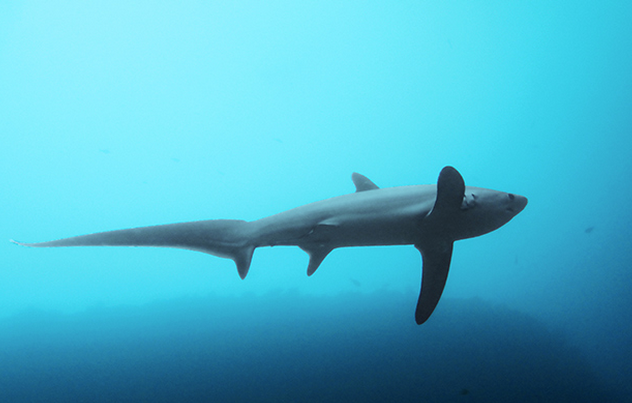
Thresher shark in Monad Shoal

The number-one dive site of Malapascua is Monad Shoal, a natural cleaning station for fish located 7.8 kilometres (4.8 mi) from the island (11°18′30″N 124°11′30″E – 30–35 minutes boat ride). The shoal is a rather unremarkable 1.5 kilometres (0.93 mi) long rock stump at the edge of a 200 metres (660 ft) drop and has a flattish top at a depth of 20 to 24 metres (66 to 79 ft). The site is best known as the only place in the world where thresher sharks can be seen regularly at and just before sunrise. They use the seamount as a cleaning station for bluestreak and moon cleaner wrasse to remove ectoparasites such as gnathiids from their skin and clean their gills and mouths. The shoal also attracts other pelagic fish such as devil rays and eagle rays. Manta rays and hammerheads are seasonal. Unfortunately most of the coral reefs of the shoal have been damaged by destructive fishing methods, as has happened all over the Philippines, and elsewhere. In June 2016 a ship ran aground on the shoal, damaging three hectares (7.4 acres) of the protected area.

== See also ==
- Carnaza Island – an island north of Malapascua

== Sources ==
- "Barangay Logon (Malapascua Island)". Municipality of Daanbantayan. Archived from the original on April 25, 2012.
- Cebu Daily News, Carmel Loise Matus (July 1, 2016). "Ship owner assures $1.5-M rehab funds for Monad Shoal". Archived from the original on July 2, 2016.
- San Francisco Chronicle, Glen Martin (May 30, 2002). "The depths of destruction / Dynamite fishing ravages Philippines' precious coral reefs". Archived from the original on August 2, 2002.
- "Photos Reveal Ship Damage to Coral Reef in Shark Sanctuary". National Geographic. June 23, 2016.
