= Daanbantayan =

Municipality in Cebu, Philippines

- Municipality
- Municipality of Daanbantayan
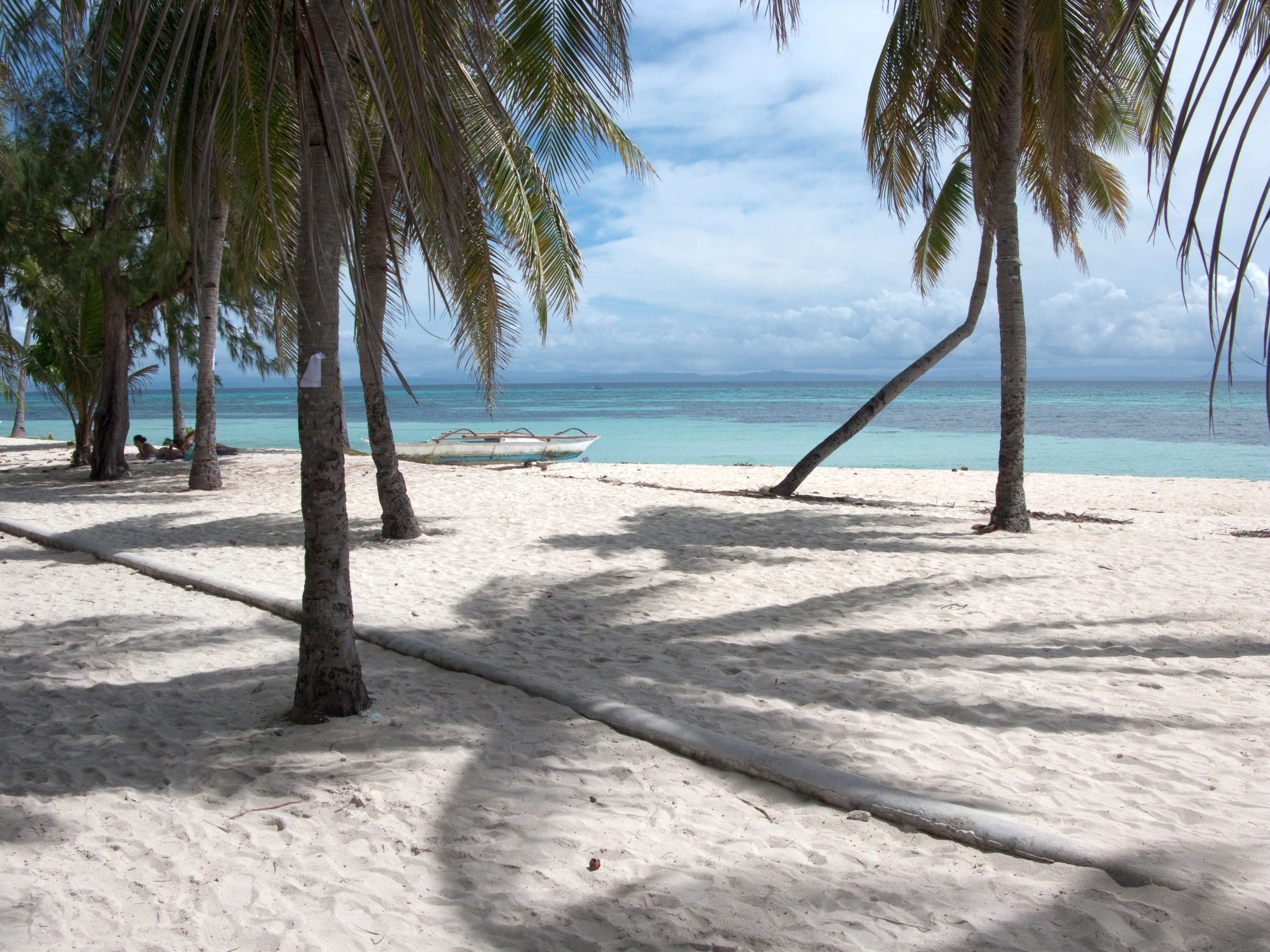
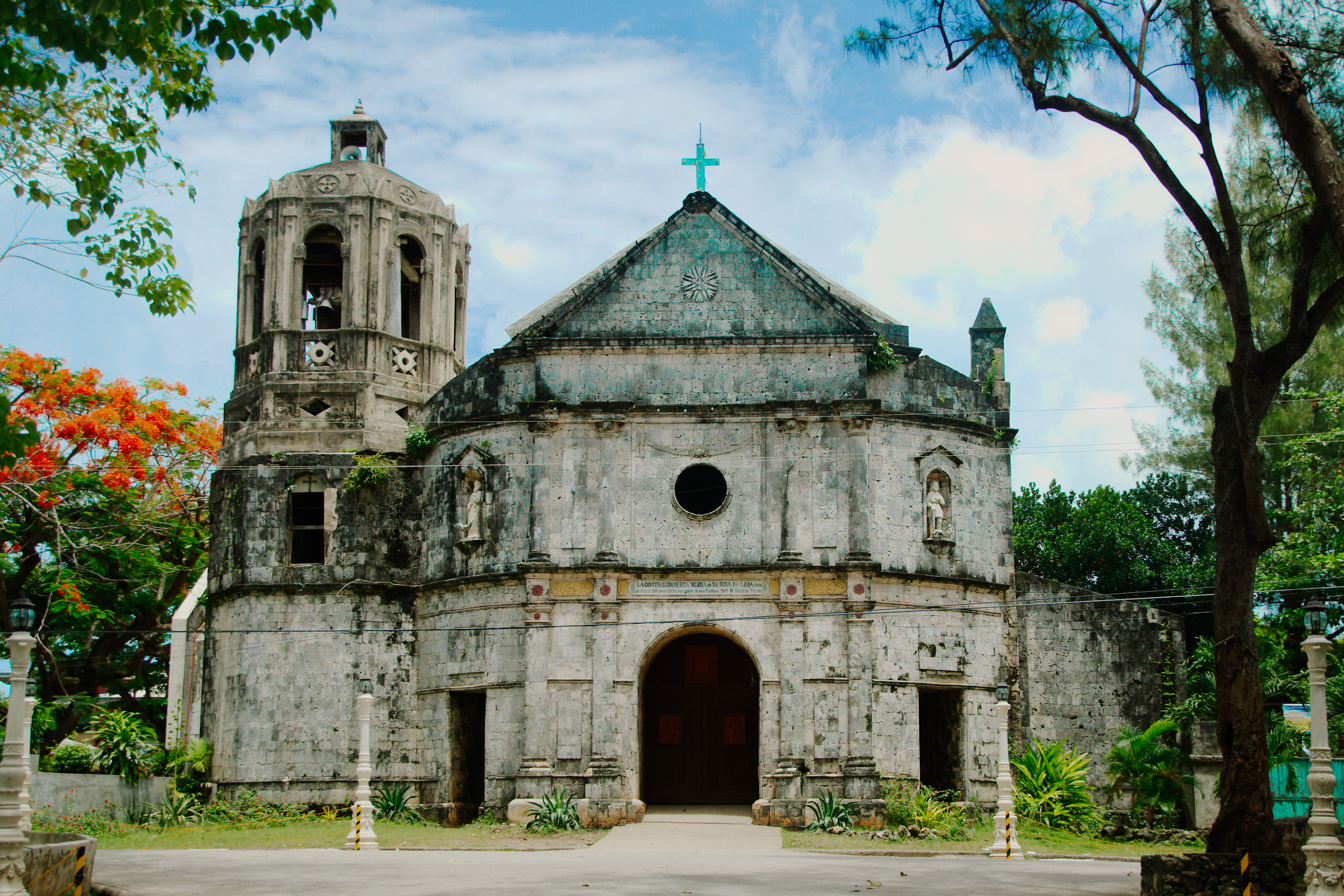
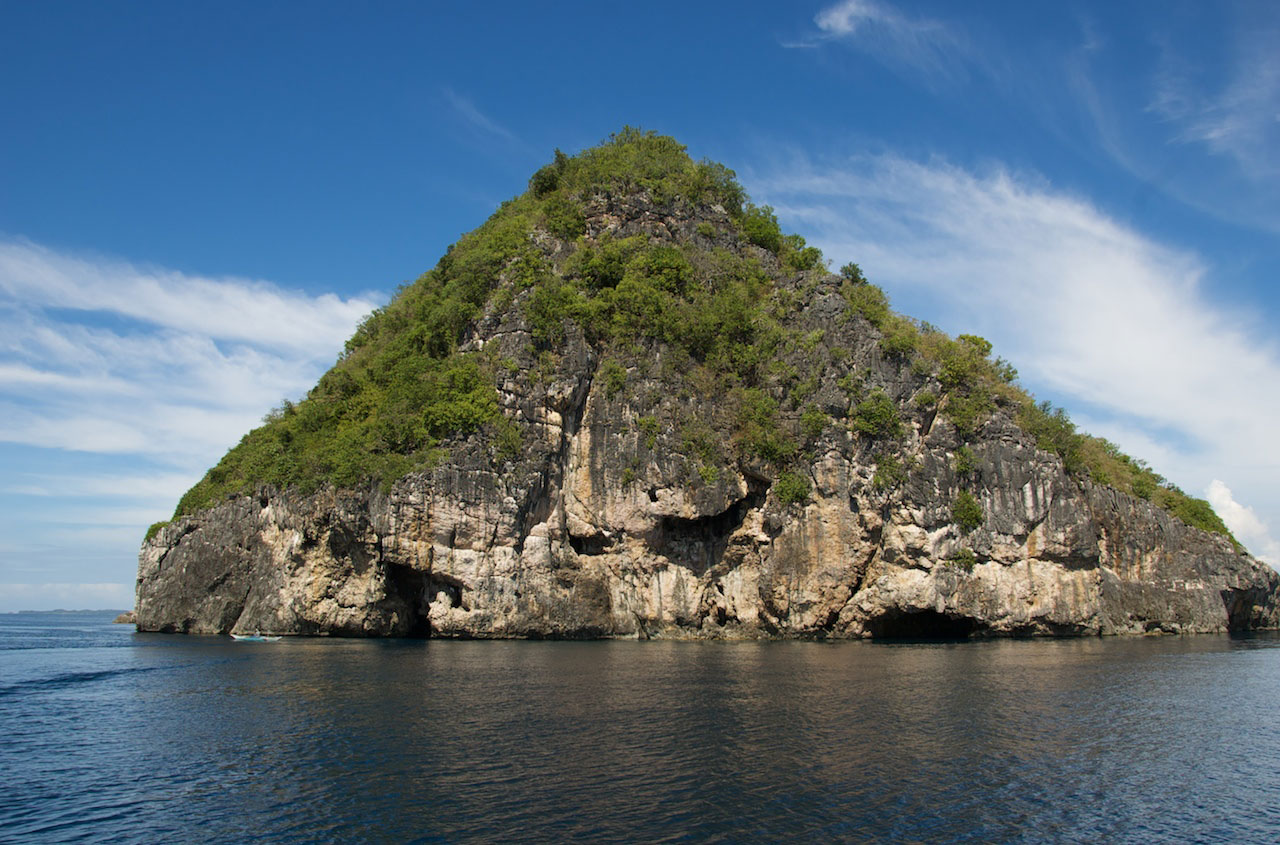
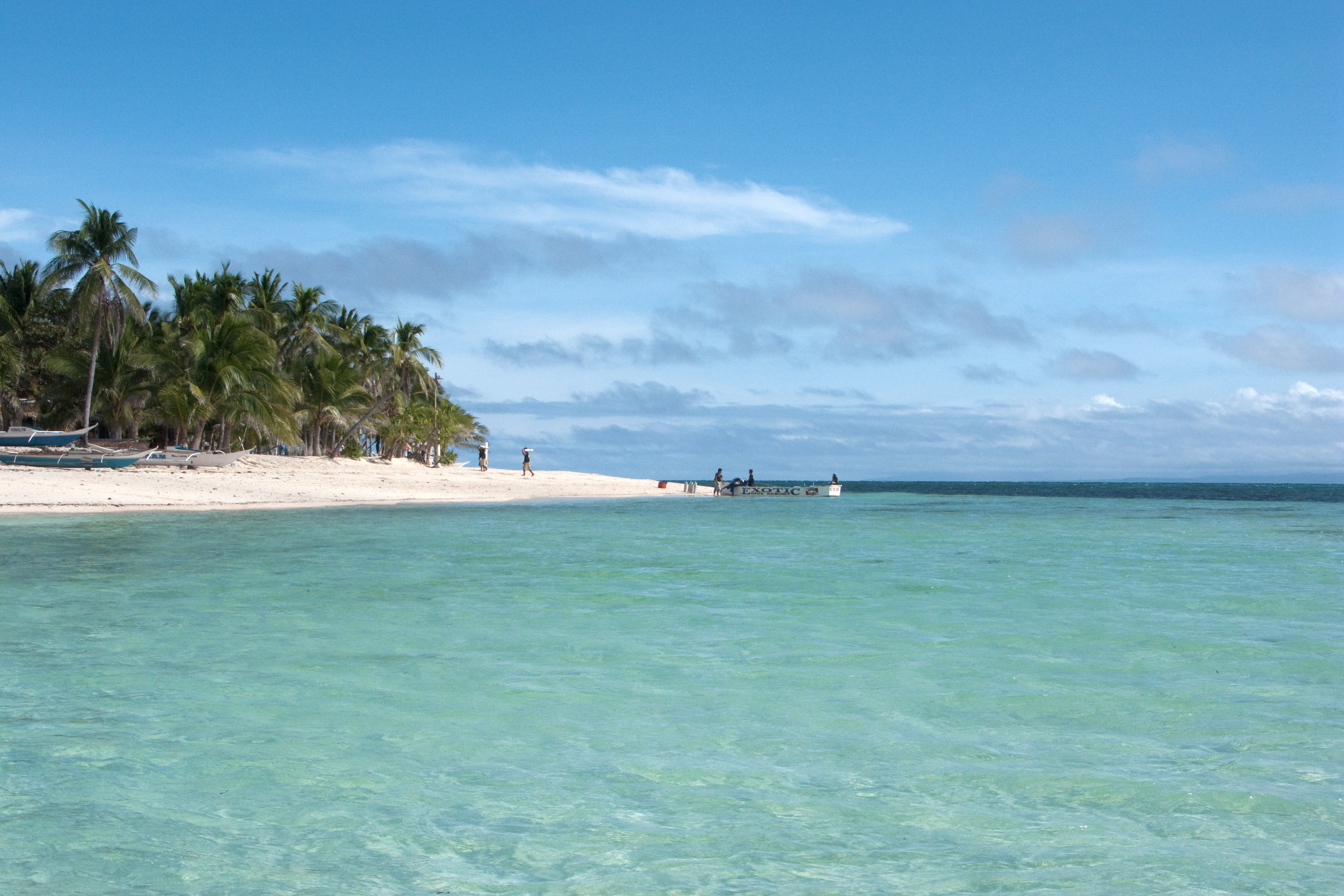
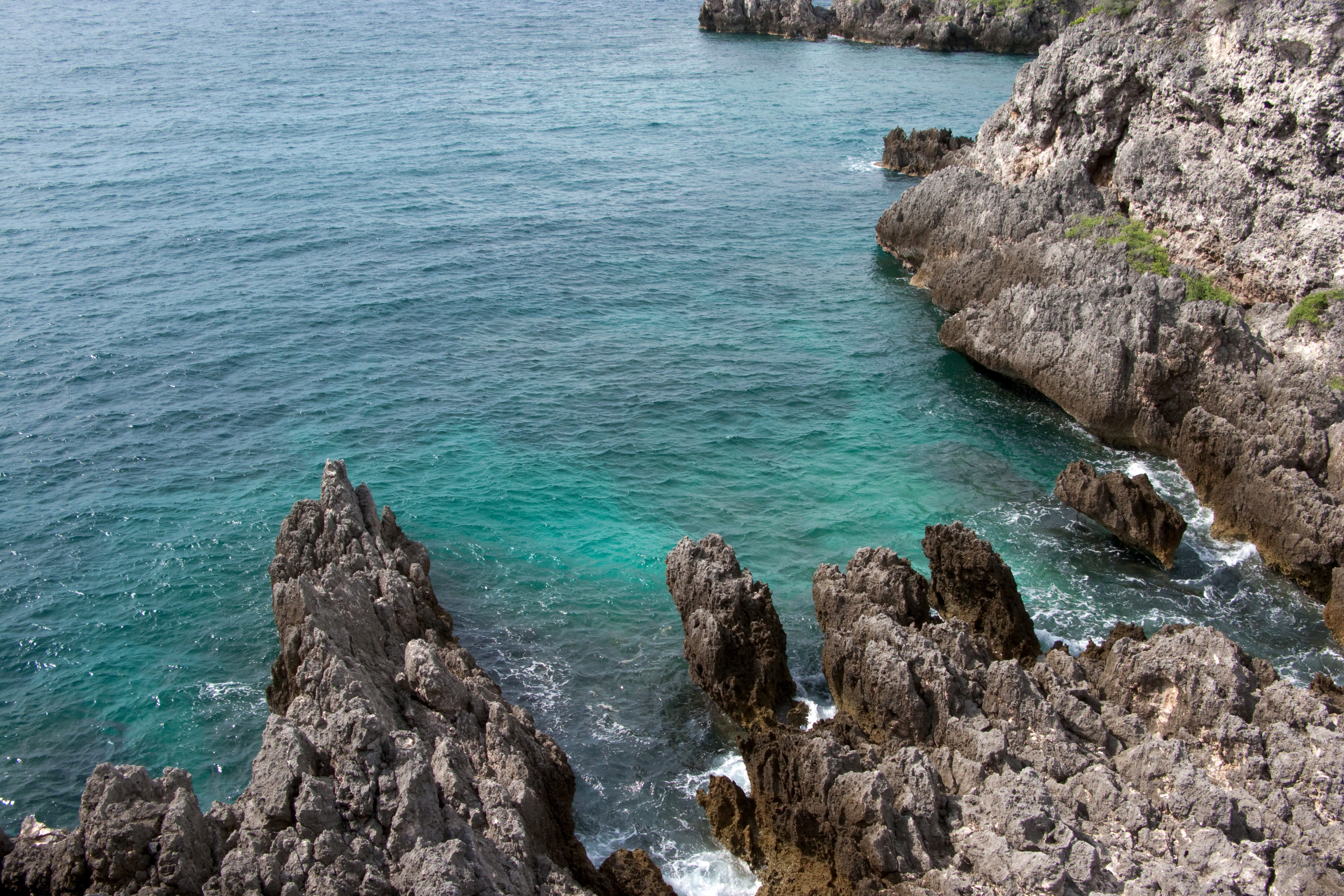
- Left to right, from the top: Malapascua Beach, Daanbantayan Church, Gato Island, Malapascua Island, and Malapascua Rocky Shore

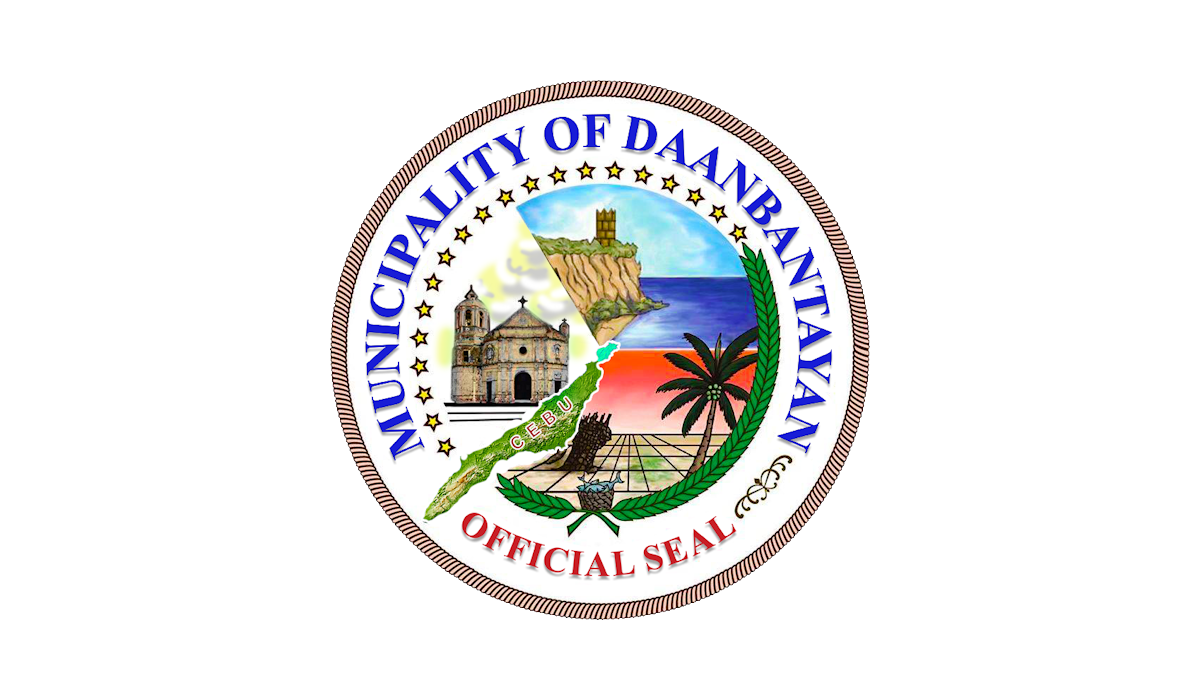
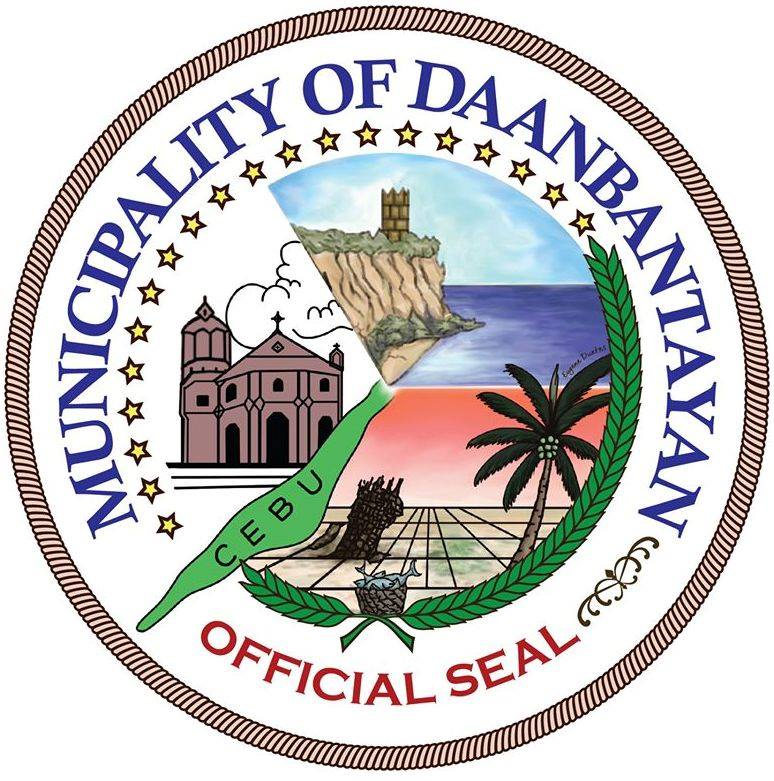
- Flag Seal

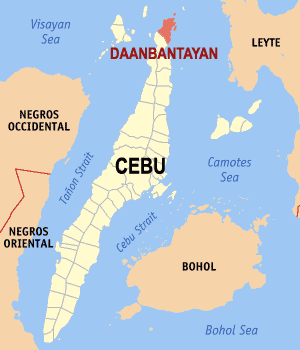
- Map of Cebu with Daanbantayan highlighted
- Interactive map of Daanbantayan
- Location within the Philippines
- Coordinates: 11°15′N 124°00′E
- Country: Philippines
- Region: Central Visayas
- Province: Cebu
- District: 4th district
- Founded: 1886
- Barangays: 20 (see Barangays)

Government
  - Type: Sangguniang Bayan
  - Mayor: Gilbert M. Arrabis, Jr. (NUP)
  - Vice Mayor: Elver Ali B. Abucay (1Cebu)
  - Representative: Sun J. Shimura (PMP)
  - Municipal Council: Members: Simplicio P. Mantos; Louise Marvi Loot-Pinos; Jupiter Roy M. Rosell; Wendell V. Rosell; Chona R. De Leon; Bernardito A. Luche, Jr.; Jose Maria C. Gastardo; Maria Bregidorietta M. Tancawan
  - Electorate: 57,409 voters (2025)

Area
  - Total: 92.27 km^{2} (35.63 sq mi)
- Elevation: 11 m (36 ft)
- Highest elevation: 120 m (390 ft)
- Lowest elevation: 0 m (0 ft)

Population (2024 census)
  - Total: 95,080
  - Density: 1,030/km^{2} (2,669/sq mi)
  - Households: 22,289

Economy
  - Income class: 1st municipal income class
  - Poverty incidence: 29.46% (2023)
  - Revenue: ₱ 363.5 million (2024)
  - Assets: ₱ 947.3 million (2024)
  - Expenditure: ₱ 220.2 million (2024)
  - Liabilities: ₱ 101 million (2024)

Service provider
  - Electricity: Cebu 2 Electric Cooperative (CEBECO 2)
- Time zone: UTC+8 (PST)
- ZIP code: 6013
- PSGC: 072221000
- IDD : area code: +63 (0)32
- Native languages: Cebuano; Tagalog

Daanbantayan, officially the Municipality of Daanbantayan (Cebuano: Lungsod sa Daanbantayan; Tagalog: Bayan ng Daanbantayan), is a municipality in the province of Cebu, Philippines. According to the 2024 census, it has a population of 95,080 people.

Daanbantayan celebrates its annual fiesta along with the Haladaya Festival which starts 21 August and ends with street-dancing on 30 August, in honor of Datu Daya, the legendary founder of the town.

== History ==
The name Daanbantayan was derived from two words: the word "daan", which means "old" in Cebuano, and the word "bantayan", which refers to a place that served as a look out for Moro raiders during the Pre-Hispanic Philippines. The original site of the town might have been at an elevated vantage point near Punta, in Tapilon.

On 8 November 2013, 9 people were killed and 50 injured when Super Typhoon Haiyan (known as Yolanda within the Philippine area of responsibility) passed over Daanbantayan.

== Geography ==
Located at the northern tip of Cebu, Daanbantayan is bordered on the north by the Visayan Sea, to the west by Bantayan Island, on the east by the Camotes Sea, and on the south by the town of Medellin. It is 136 kilometres (85 mi) from Cebu City.

=== Islands and thalassic attractions ===
There are several small islands / islets and diving spots, with the list below arranged by latitude from nearest to farthest from Cebu island:

- Chocolate (11°18′20″N 124°03′48″E)
- Monad Shoal (11°18′30″N 124°11′30″E)
- Malapascua (11°20′00″N 124°07′00″E) 600 ha (1,483 acres)
- Gato cave & islet (11°26′48″N 124°01′13″E) 4.5 ha (11 acres)
- Maria (11°29′34″N 124°06′13″E) 1.5 ha (4 acres)
- Carnaza (11°30′50″N 124°05′58″E) 175 ha (432 acres)

=== Barangays ===
Daanbantayan is politically subdivided into 20 barangays. Each barangay consists of puroks and some have sitios.

PSGC	Barangay	Population			±% p.a.	
		2024		2010		
072221001	Aguho	6.0%	5,726	4,836	▴	1.18%
072221002	Bagay	4.8%	4,549	4,015	▴	0.87%
072221003	Bakhawan	2.7%	2,540	2,267	▴	0.79%
072221004	Bateria	3.9%	3,664	3,252	▴	0.83%
072221005	Bitoon	5.0%	4,753	4,350	▴	0.62%
072221006	Calape	2.3%	2,233	2,518	▾	−0.83%
072221007	Carnaza	2.4%	2,259	2,360	▾	−0.30%
072221008	Dalingding	2.2%	2,137	2,069	▴	0.22%
072221009	Lanao	3.5%	3,313	2,968	▴	0.77%
072221010	Logon	6.0%	5,720	4,496	▴	1.69%
072221011	Malbago	4.6%	4,408	3,311	▴	2.01%
072221012	Malingin	1.7%	1,600	1,512	▴	0.39%
072221013	Maya	9.3%	8,822	7,815	▴	0.85%
072221014	Pajo	3.8%	3,634	2,970	▴	1.41%
072221015	Paypay	3.0%	2,888	2,741	▴	0.36%
072221016	Poblacion	8.2%	7,794	7,144	▴	0.61%
072221017	Talisay	4.5%	4,297	3,802	▴	0.85%
072221018	Tapilon	8.8%	8,323	7,281	▴	0.93%
072221019	Tinubdan	2.1%	2,002	2,050	▾	−0.16%
072221020	Tominjao	4.0%	3,768	3,149	▴	1.25%
	Total		95,080	74,897	▴	1.67%

=== Climate ===
Climate data for Daanbantayan, Cebu
Month	Jan	Feb	Mar	Apr	May	Jun	Jul	Aug	Sep	Oct	Nov	Dec	Year
Mean daily maximum °C (°F)	28 (82)	29 (84)	29 (84)	31 (88)	31 (88)	30 (86)	30 (86)	30 (86)	30 (86)	29 (84)	29 (84)	29 (84)	30 (85)
Mean daily minimum °C (°F)	22 (72)	22 (72)	22 (72)	23 (73)	24 (75)	25 (77)	25 (77)	25 (77)	25 (77)	24 (75)	24 (75)	23 (73)	24 (75)
Average precipitation mm (inches)	73 (2.9)	56 (2.2)	75 (3.0)	71 (2.8)	114 (4.5)	174 (6.9)	172 (6.8)	163 (6.4)	167 (6.6)	161 (6.3)	158 (6.2)	125 (4.9)	1,509 (59.5)
Average rainy days	15.2	12.5	16.2	17.3	23.9	27.3	28.4	26.9	26.9	27.1	23.8	19.3	264.8
Source: Meteoblue (modeled/calculated data, not measured locally)

== Demographics ==
Population census of Daanbantayan

Year	Pop.	±% p.a.
1903	14,735	—
1918	21,334	+2.50%
1939	24,198	+0.60%
1948	29,484	+2.22%
1960	34,599	+1.34%
1970	40,649	+1.62%

Year	Pop.	±% p.a.
1975	43,228	+1.24%
1980	45,926	+1.22%
1990	58,771	+2.50%
1995	64,845	+1.86%
2000	69,336	+1.45%
2007	73,254	+0.76%

Year	Pop.	±% p.a.
2010	74,897	+0.81%
2015	84,430	+2.31%
2020	93,502	+2.17%
2024	95,080	+0.40%

Source: Philippine Statistics Authority

== Economy ==
Poverty incidence of Daanbantayan (%)

Source: Philippine Statistics Authority

== Transportation ==
Ceres Liner (And Sugbo Transit), White Stallion Express (Subsidiary Of Rough Riders) and Cebu Autobus are among the bus companies with regular service to and from Cebu city (North Bus Terminal). Jeepneys, tricycles, and trisikads are the main modes of transportation within the town.

== Tourism ==
Daanbantayan is now known for its pristine, white powder-like sandy beaches – one of which is Malapascua Island. With its vast and rich marine resources, it hosts a long string of dive sites offering unique marine life and beauty.

As a tourist destination, Daanbantayan stages the Haladaya Festival every year as an added attraction to local vacationers, holiday-makers, Filipino expatriates, and foreign tourists from as far away as North America, South America, and Europe.

=== Attractions ===
The church of St. Rose of Lima was damaged in the 2025 Cebu earthquake.

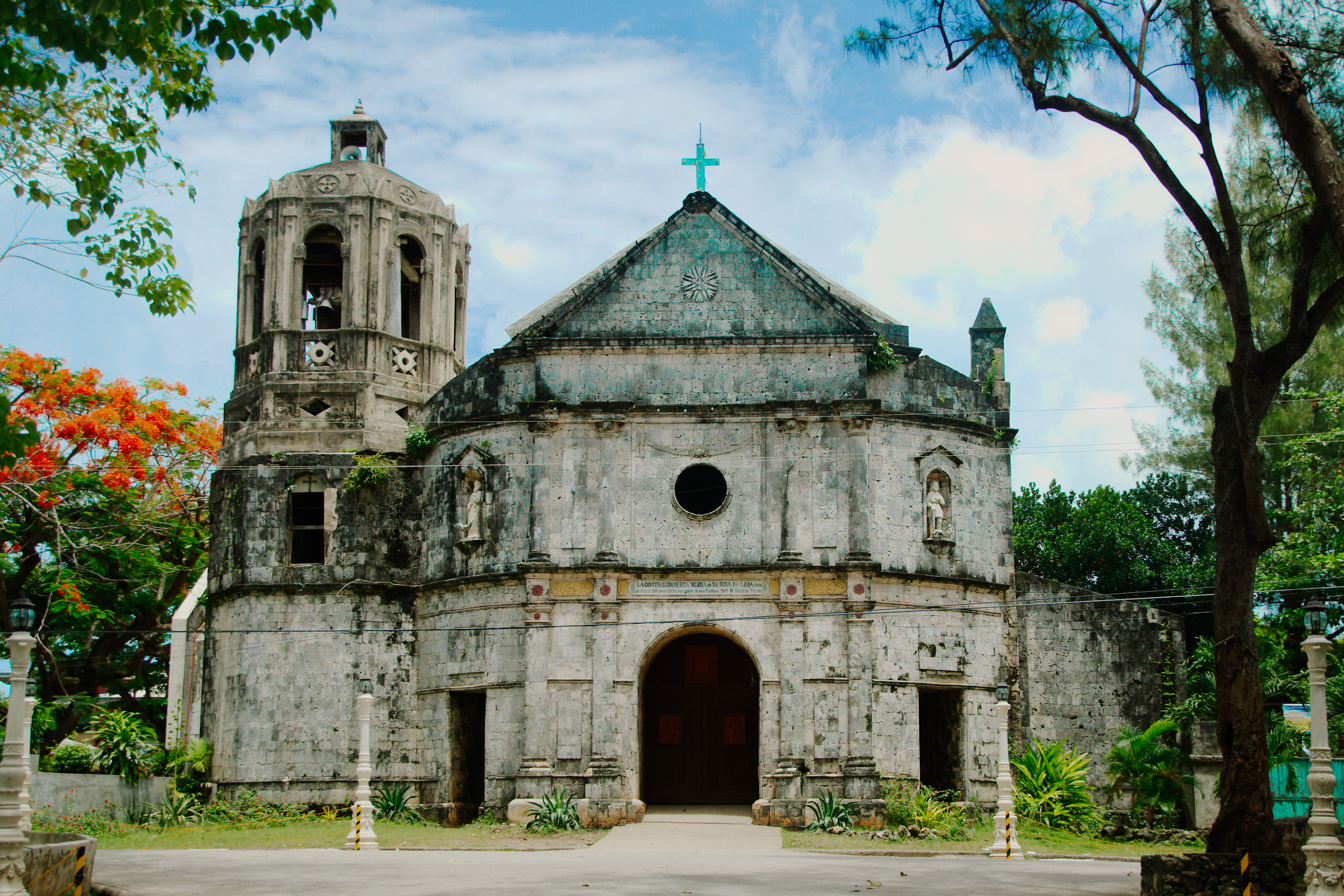
Santa Rosa de Lima Church

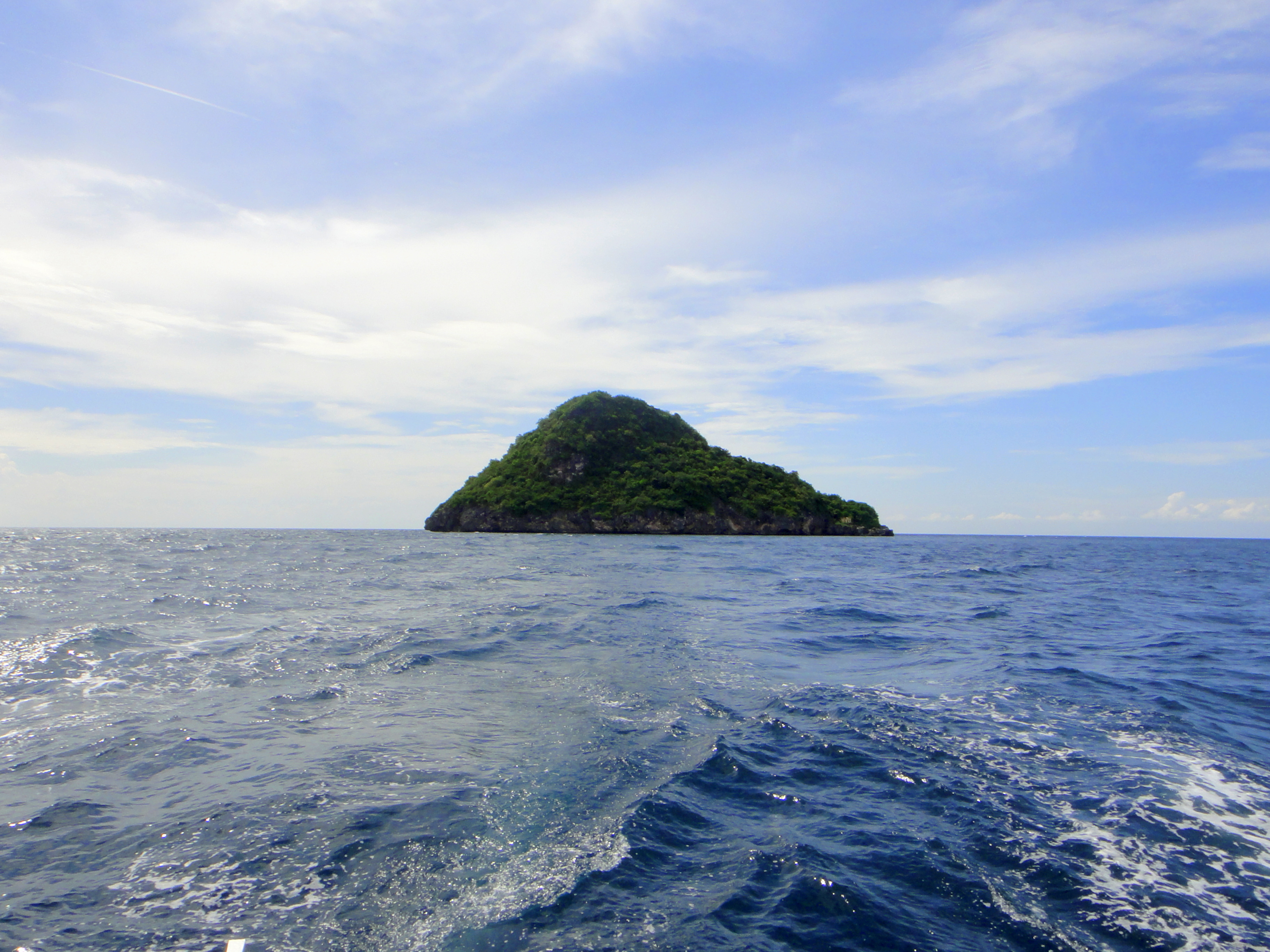
Approaching Gato Islet

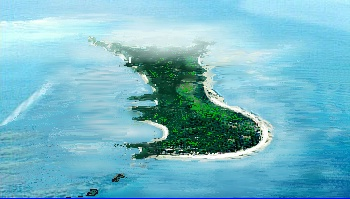
Malapascua island from the air

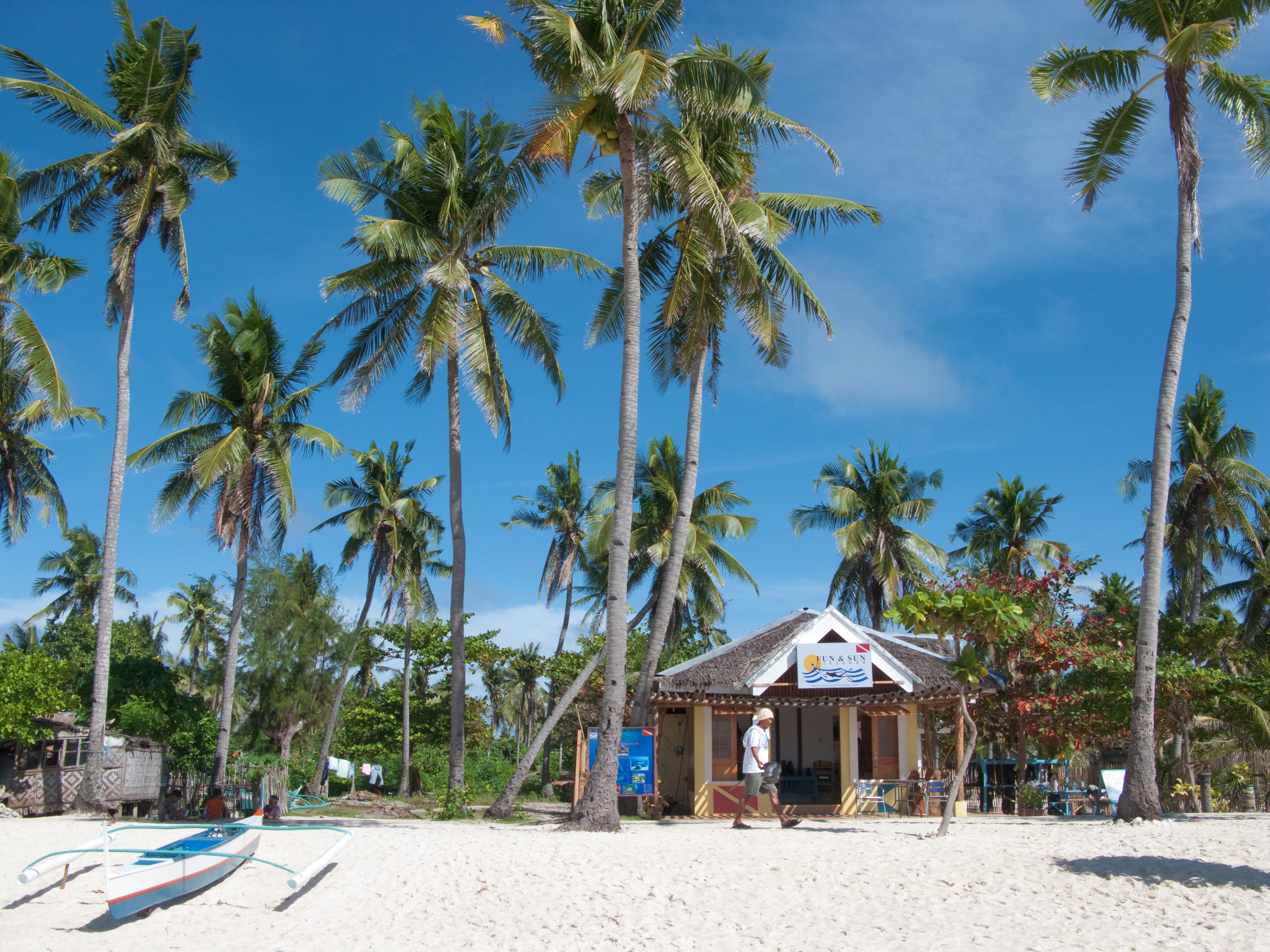
Malapascua Island
- Municipal hall – built in 1916.
- Santa Rosa de Lima Church – inaugurated on 10 April 1858 and finished in 1886.
- Town plaza – site of a battle between the so-called Daanbantayan Volunteers and 19 well-armed bandits led by Capitan Berinoin 1898.
- San Pedro River - its northern bank has an abandoned Muslim settlement founded by Datu Daya during the pre-Spanish era.
- Tapilon point (also known as Punta Sampero) – site of the watchtower of Kandaya, called "daang bantayanan". But there are no remains of the watchtower.
- Malapascua Island – is situated across a shallow strait from the northernmost tip of Cebu. This small island is known for its wide white sand beach, Bounty Beach; it has also become known as a superior diving destination.
- Gato Cave and Islet – a small sharp rocky island rising in the middle of the Visayan Sea, about 15 kilometres (9 miles) from Malapascua. The 83-metre-high (272 ft) island is home to nesting seabirds, a colony of flying foxes, soft coral canyons, and rare and unusual nudibranchs.
- Monad Shoal – a 20-metre-deep (66 ft) seamount known for its thresher sharks, making the shoal popular for recreational divers. The common thresher shark (alopias vulpinus) and pelagic thresher shark (alopias pelagicus) normally live in depths as deep as 350 metres (1,148 feet), but the shoal offers opportunities to see them in less than 20 metres of water.
