= Carnaza =

- Location within Visayas Location within Philippines

Geography
- Location: Visayan Sea
- Coordinates: 11.509°N 124.098°E
- Archipelago: Eastern Visayas
- Area: 173.5 ha (429 acres)
- Highest point: 55 m (180 ft)

Administration
- Philippines
- Municipality: Daanbantayan
- Barangay: Carnaza

Carnaza is a barangay in the Philippines located on the island of the same name. The 173.5-hectare (429-acre) turtle-shaped island is located north of Malapascua Island which itself is north of mainland Cebu. Carnaza is then the northernmost offshore island and barangay of the municipality of Daanbantayan. The island is bordered on all sides by the Visayan Sea.

== Topography ==
The island's topography includes coastal plains, mangrove swamps, lagoons and semi-rounded hills. Its coastal plain constitutes about 9.7% while semi-rounded hills constitute the biggest portion of the island covering about 14.4% of the total area. The mangrove forest has an area of about 10.1 hectares or 5.8% of the island. The highest point was measured at 55 metres (180 feet) above sea level.

Within the small island are the sitios of Candionesio, Carnaza, Daanbaryo, Linao, Liog‑liog and Pantao.

== Flora ==
The dominant upland vegetation is ipil-ipil (Leucaena leucocephala), which covered most of the slopes. Agricultural crops like coconuts, cassava, banana, sugarcane, corn and breadfruit, among others, are present in some areas.

== Fauna ==
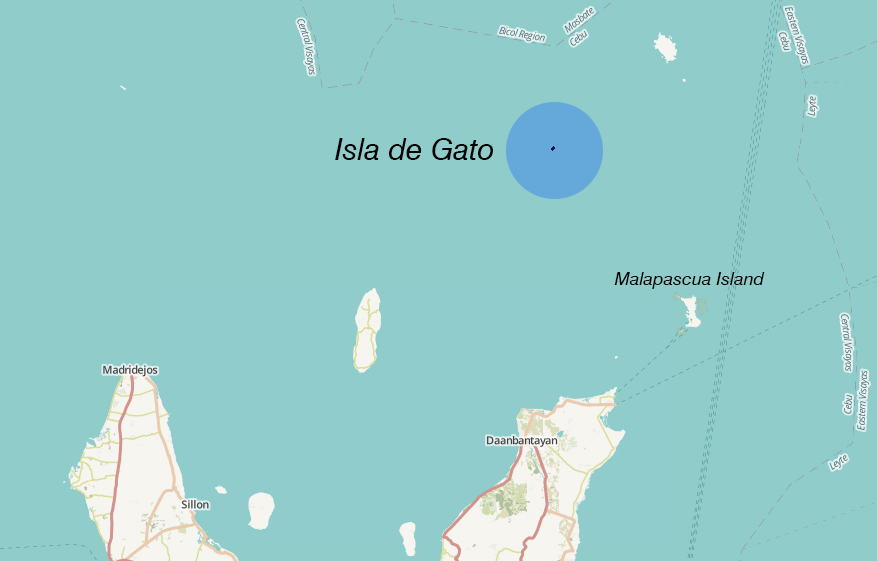
Carnaza Island is the white speck northeast of Gato Island in the middle of the Visayan Sea.

On a paper report on the survey conducted on the island on July 16–20, 1990, a total of 18 species of birds representing 7 orders and 15 families were identified and reported. The most common species were grey-rumped swiftlets (Collocalia marginata), white-collared kingfishers (Halcyon chloris), pied trillers (Lalage nigra), black-naped orioles (Oriolus chinensis), Philippine magpie robins (Copsychus saularis), Malaysia fantails (Rhipidura javanica), white-breasted woodswallows (Artamus leucorhynchus), glossy starlings (Aplonis panayensis), yellow-breasted sunbirds (Nectarinia jugularis) and Eurasian tree sparrows (Passer montanus). For the rest of the species, either only one or two individuals were seen or only either calls were heard.

The islanders reported that the tabon bird (dusky megapode, Megapodius freycinet) used to be numerous in Carnaza Island.

Also listed on the report are the orders Cephalopoda, Gastropoda and Pelecypoda. Two genera of cephalopods were identified, namely; Sepia and Sepioteuthis.

A total of 36 species belonging to 19 families of gastropods have been listed. Further study is needed to make a complete listing.
