= Cebu =

Province in Central Visayas, Philippines

Cebu Sugbo (Cebuano)
- Province
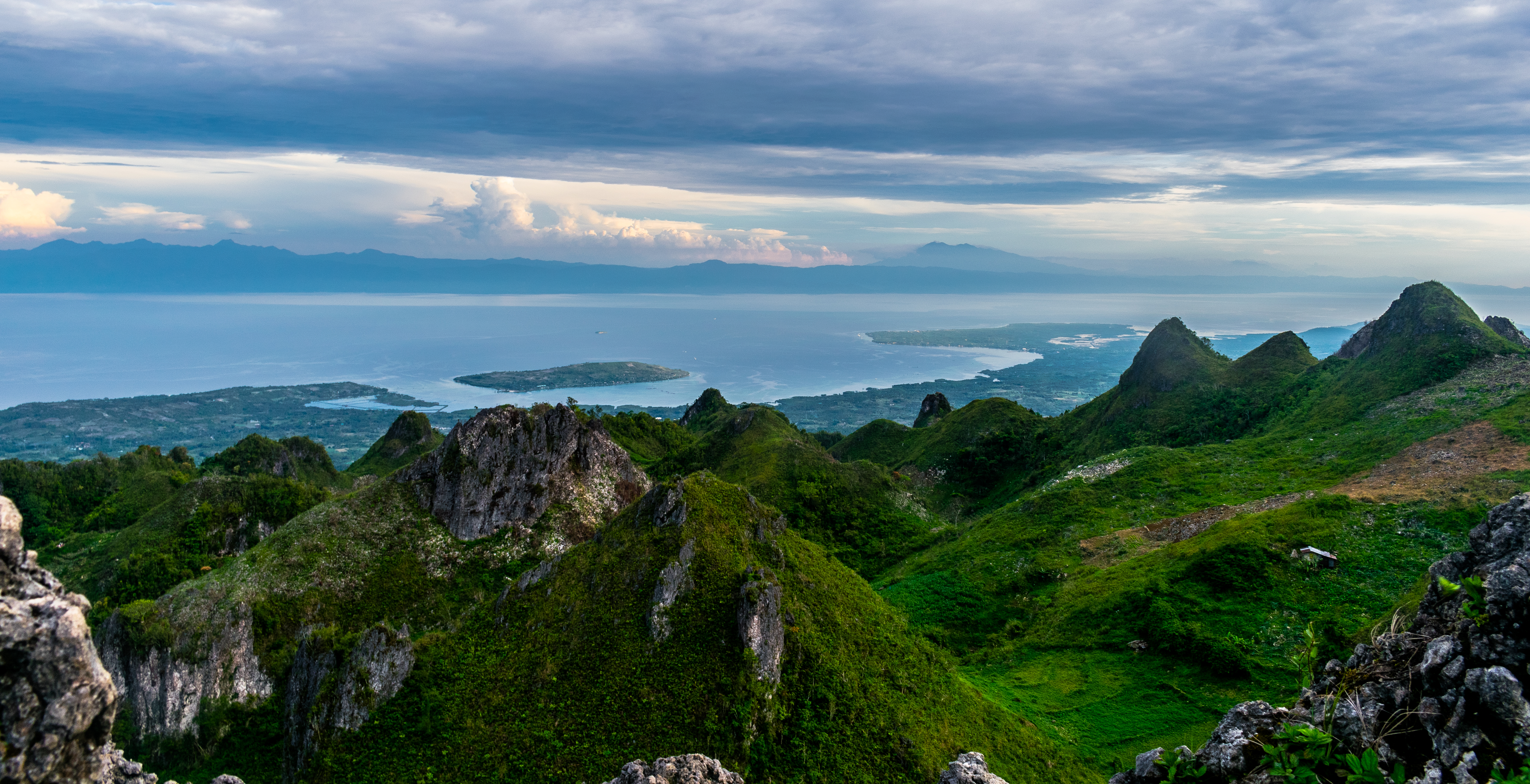
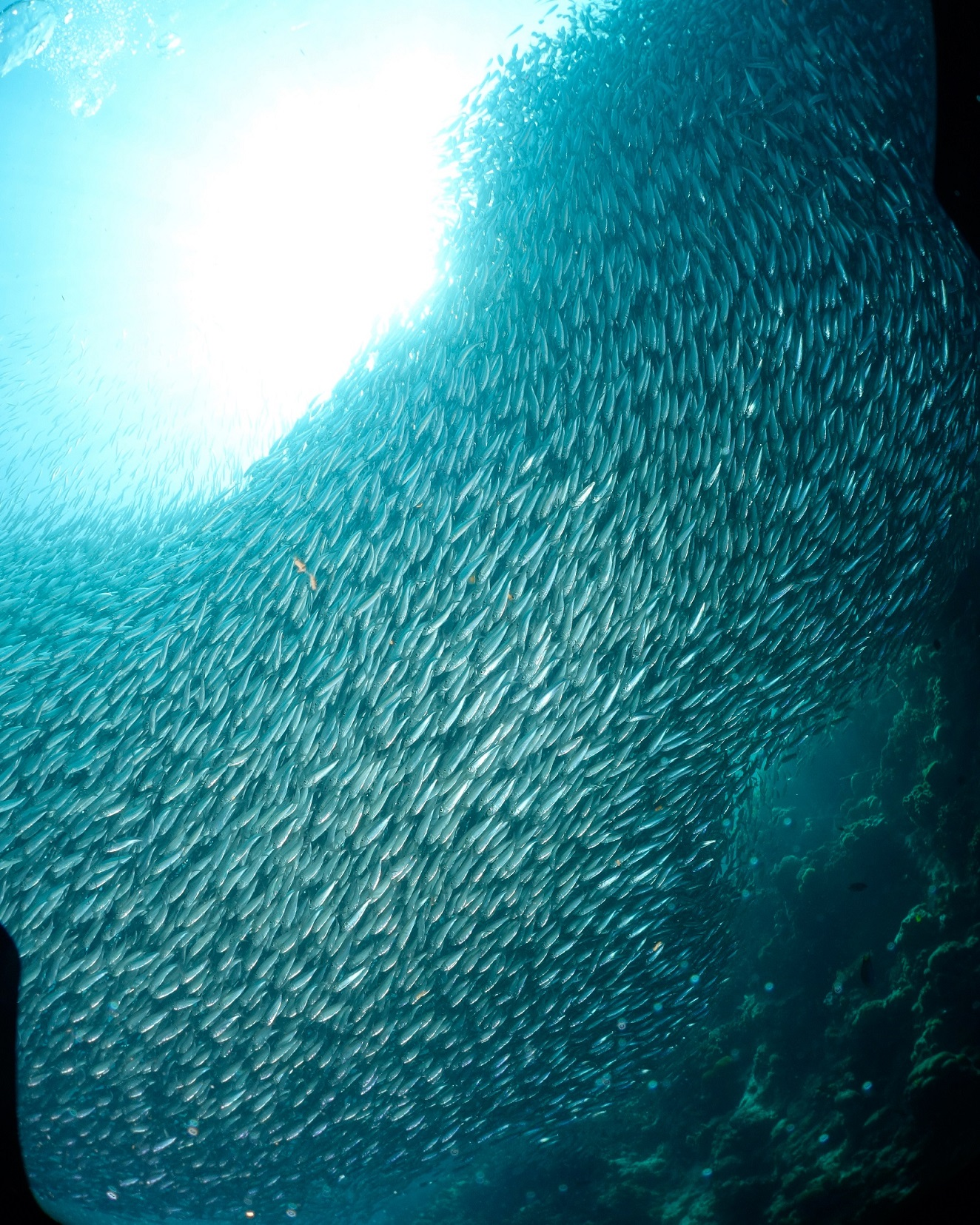
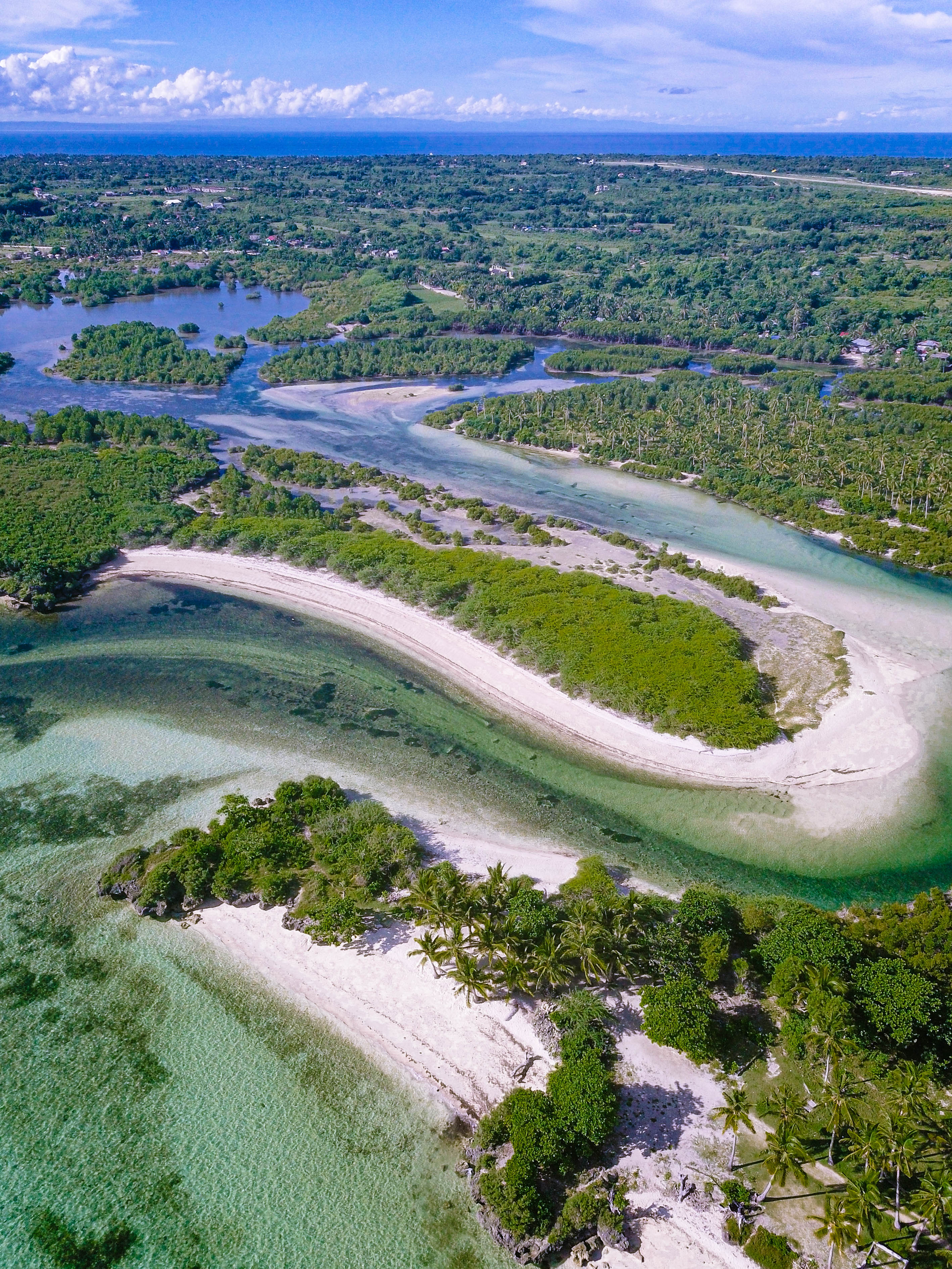
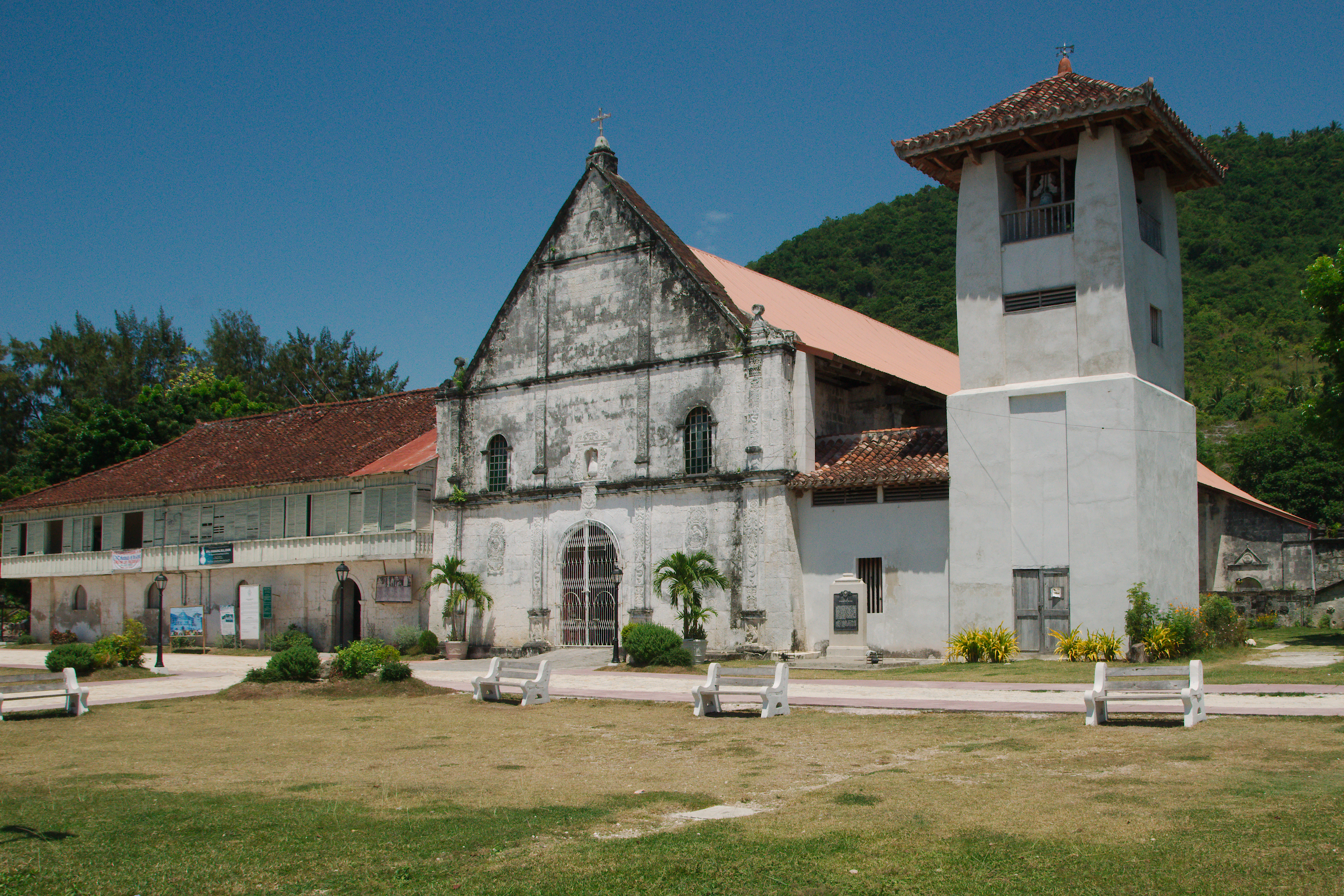
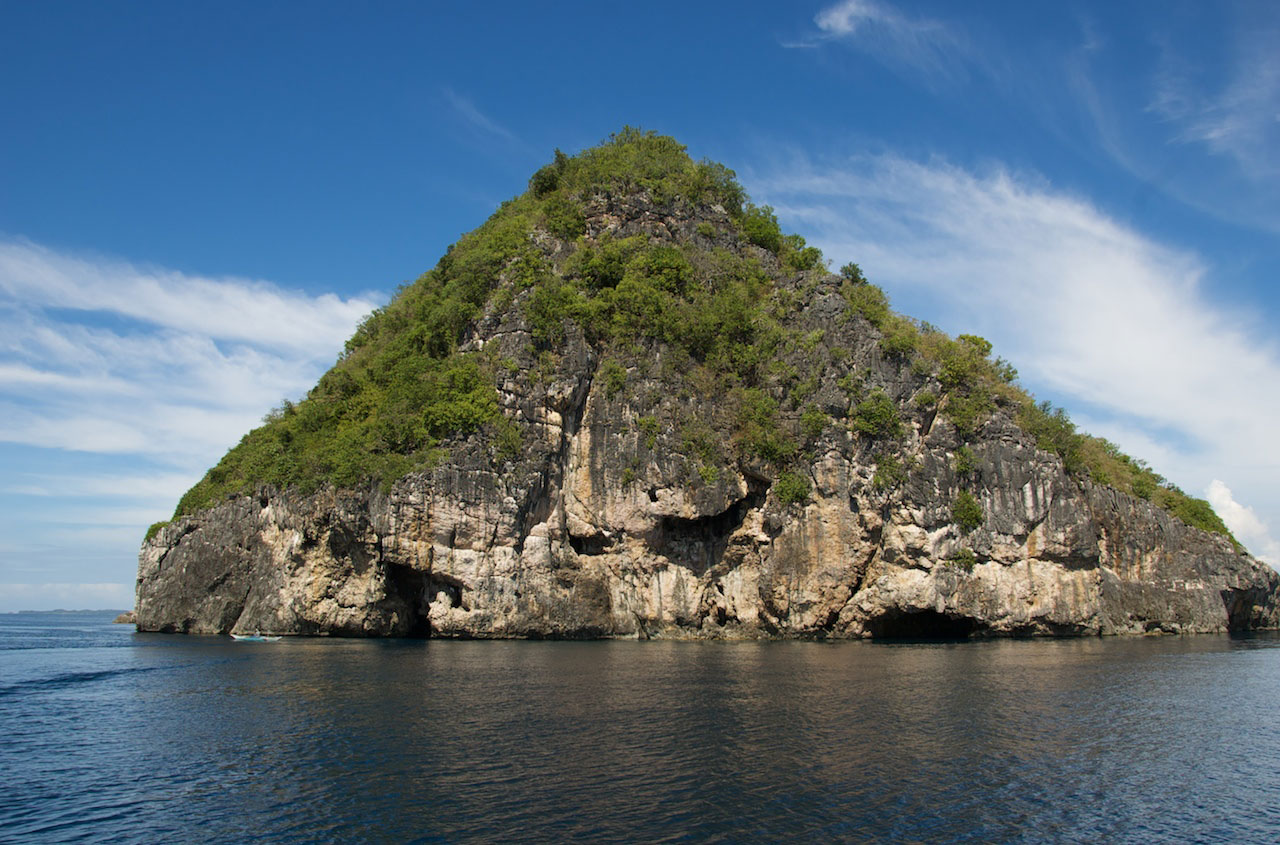
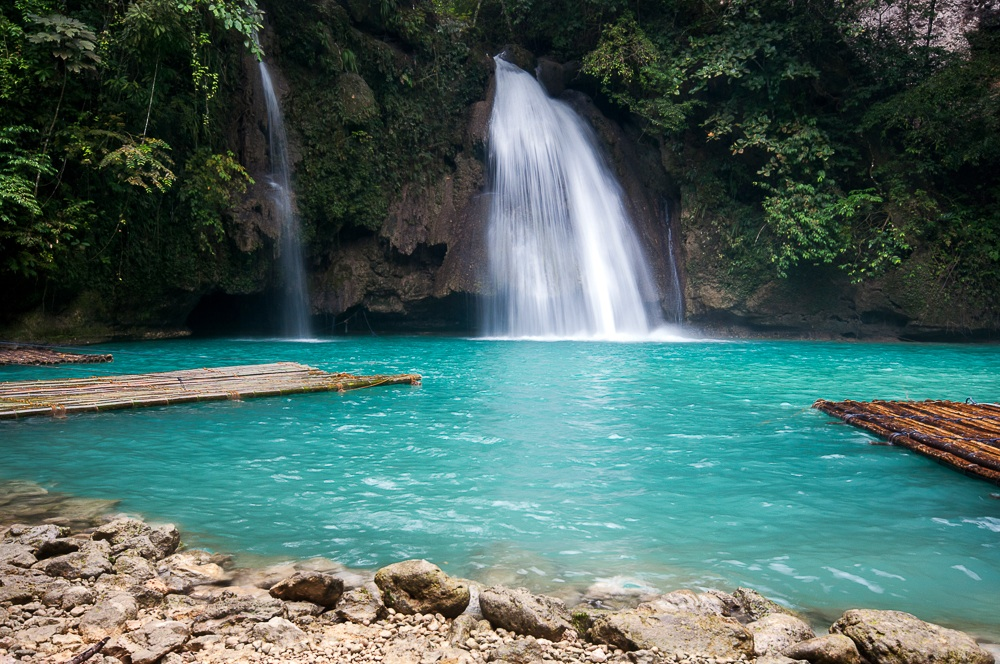
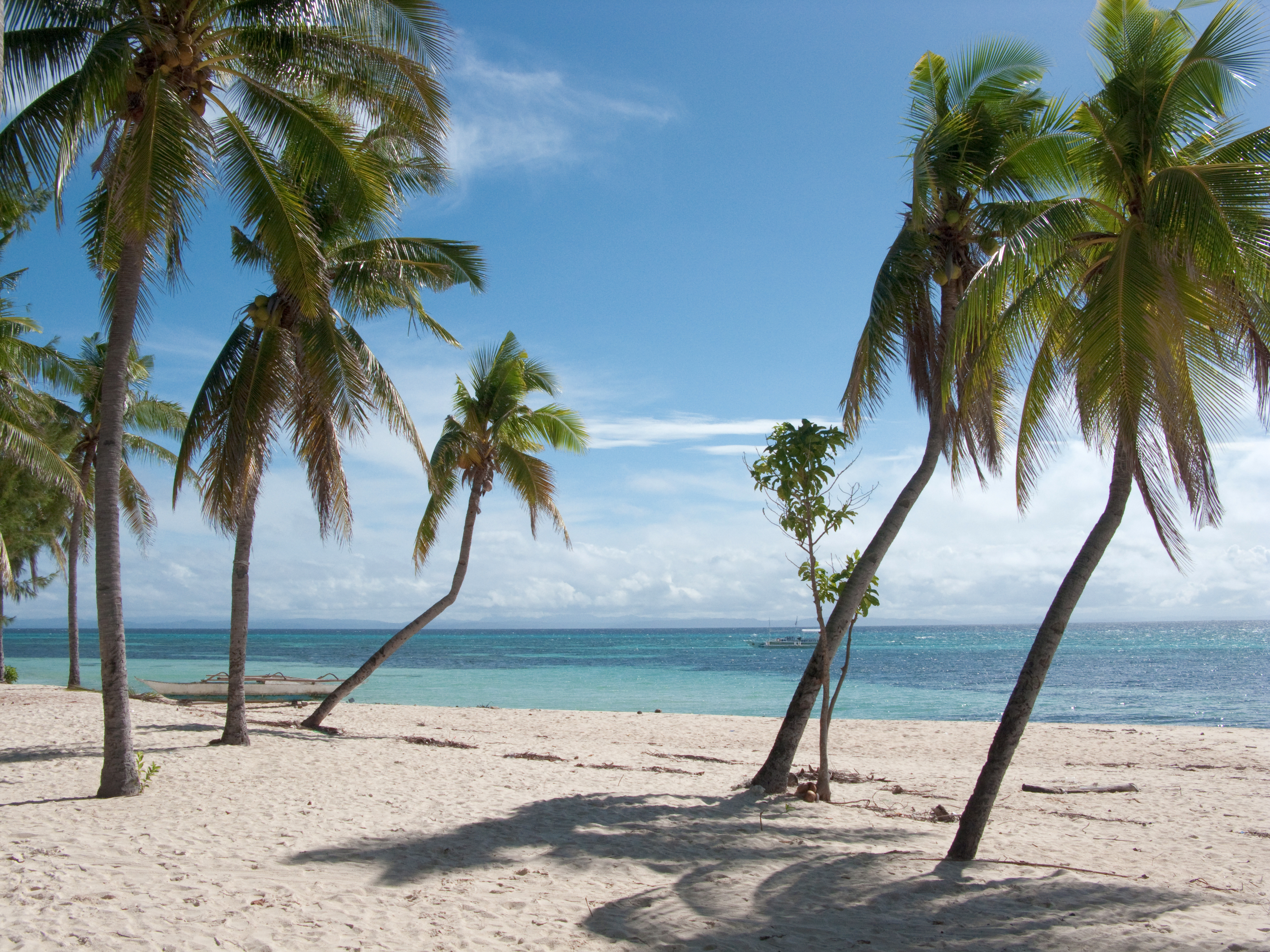
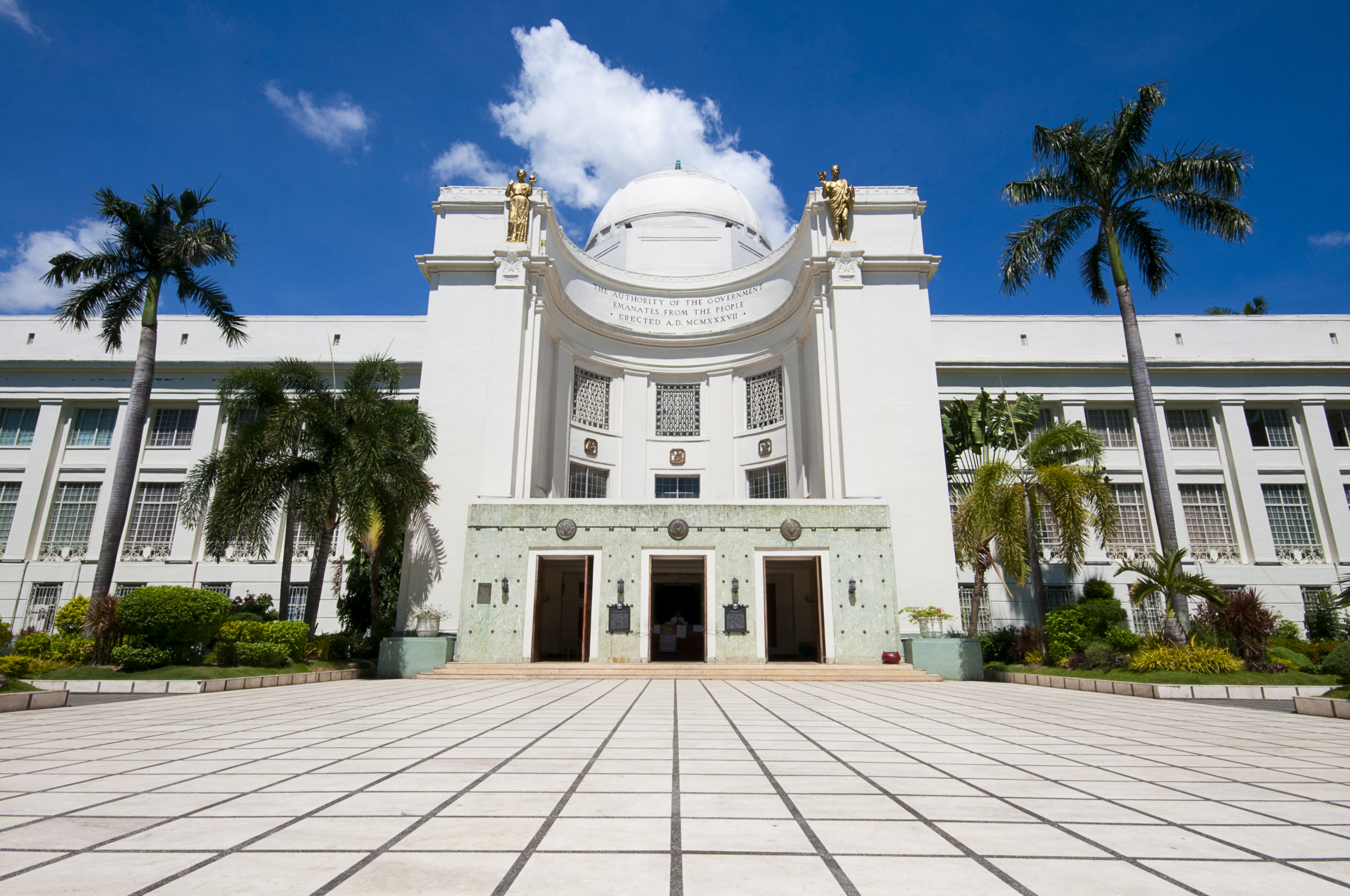
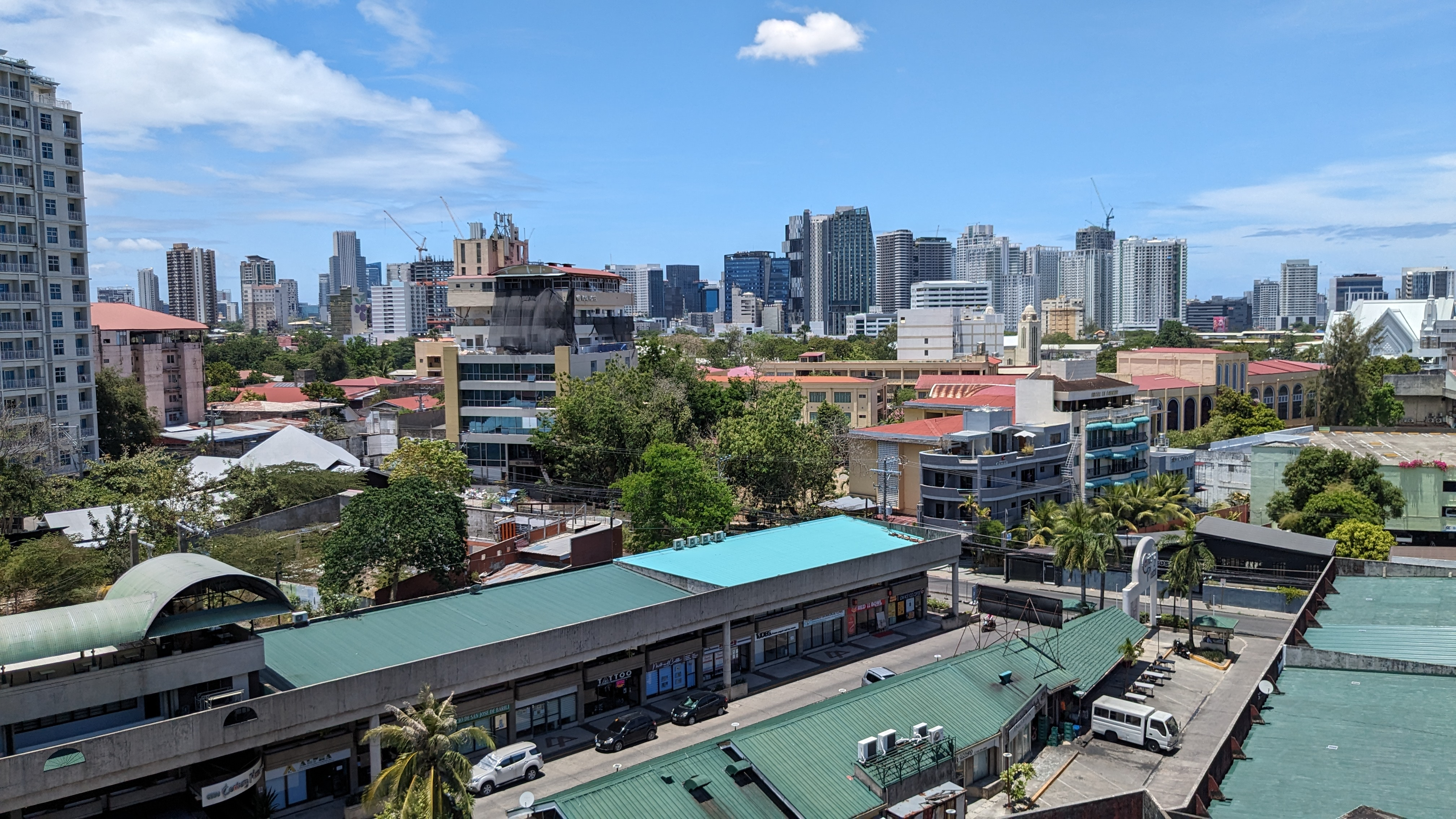
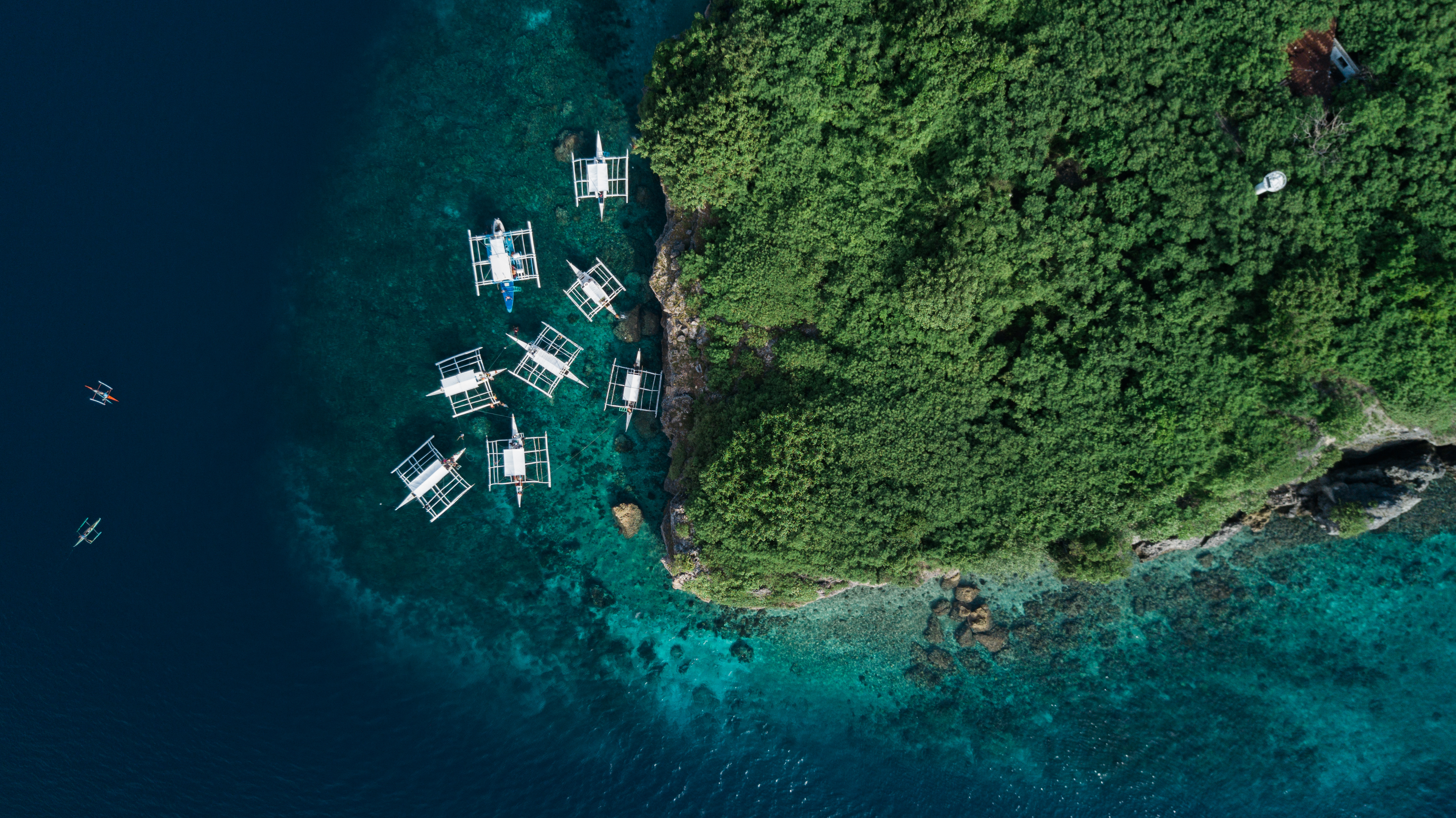
- Left to right, from the top: Osmeña Peak, Moalboal Sardine Run, Balidbid Lagoon, Boljoon Church, Gato Island, Kawasan Falls, Malapascua Island, Cebu Provincial Capitol, Skyline View of Cebu City and Pescador Island

- Flag Seal
- Nicknames: The Gateway to a Thousand Journeys; The Cradle of Christianity in the Philippines; Province of Charm
- Anthem: Sugbo ("Cebu")
- Location in the Philippines
- Interactive map of Cebu
- Coordinates: 10°19′N 123°45′E
- Country: Philippines
- Island Group: Visayas
- Region: Central Visayas
- Founded: 6 August 1569
- Capital and largest city: Cebu City*

Government
  - Type: Sangguniang Panlalawigan
  - Governor: Pamela S. Baricuatro (PDP)
  - Vice Governor: Glenn Anthony O. Soco (1Cebu)
  - Legislature: Cebu Provincial Board Members: 1st ProvDist; Antonio Bacaltos Jr.; Lakambini Reluya; 2nd ProvDist; Stanley Caminero; Raymond Calderon; 3rd ProvDist; Julius Anthony Corominas; Dason Lorenz Lagon; 4th ProvDist; Kerrie Shimura; Nelson Mondigo; 5th ProvDist; Mike Villamor; Andrei Duterte; 6th ProvDist; Dason Larenz Lagon; Alfred Francis Ouano; 7th ProvDist; Cesar Baricuatro; Paz Rozgoni; Mandaue City ProvDist; Malcolm Sanchez; Nilo Seno
  - Electorate: 3,407,780 voters (2025)

Area
  - Total (province): 4,943.72 km^{2} (1,908.78 sq mi)
  - Rank: 20th out of 82
- excludes independent cities
- Highest elevation (Osmeña Peak): 1,072 m (3,517 ft)

Population (2024 census)
  - Total (province): 1,412,726
  - Rank: 5th out of 82
  - Density: 285.762/km^{2} (740.119/sq mi)
  - Rank: 7th out of 82
  - Households: 799,486
- Population data excludes independent cities

Divisions
  - Independent cities: 3: Cebu City*; Lapu-Lapu*; Mandaue*
  - Component cities: 6: Bogo; Carcar; Danao; Naga; Talisay; Toledo
  - Municipalities: 44: Alcantara; Alcoy; Alegria; Aloguinsan; Argao; Asturias; Badian; Balamban; Bantayan; Barili; Bogo; Boljoon; Borbon; Carcar; Carmen; Catmon; Compostela; Consolacion; Cordova; Daanbantayan; Dalaguete; Danao; Dumanjug; Ginatilan; Liloan; Madridejos; Malabuyoc; Medellin; Minglanilla; Moalboal; Naga; Oslob; Pilar; Pinamungajan; Poro; Ronda; Samboan; San Fernando; San Francisco; San Remigio; Santa Fe; Santander; Sibonga; Sogod; Tabogon; Tabuelan; Talisay; Toledo; Tuburan; Tudela
• Barangay
1,066
+ 137	including independent cities
1,203	including independent cities
  - Districts: Legislative districts of Cebu; Legislative districts of Cebu City; Legislative district of Lapu-Lapu; Legislative district of Mandaue

Economy
  - Income class: 1st provincial income class
  - Poverty incidence: 11.7% (2023)
  - Revenue: ₱ 7,822 million (2024)
  - Assets: ₱ 339,850 million (2024)
  - Expenditure: ₱ 2,074 million (2024)
  - Liabilities: ₱ 3,433 million (2024)
- Time zone: UTC+8 (PST)
- PSGC: 072200000
- IDD : area code: +63 (0)32
- ISO 3166 code: PH-CEB
- Spoken languages: Cebuano; Forohanon; Bantayanon
- Patron: Santo Niño de Cebu
- Website: www.cebu.gov.ph
- * Cebu City, Lapu-Lapu, and Mandaue are highly-urbanized cities, politically independent from Cebu Province.

Cebu (/sɛˈbuː/ seb-OO; Cebuano: Sugbo), officially the Province of Cebu (Cebuano: Lalawigan sa Sugbo; Filipino: Lalawigan ng Cebu), is a province of the Philippines located in the Central Visayas (Region VII) region. It consists of the main island and 167 surrounding islands and islets. The coastal zone of Cebu is identified as a site of highest marine biodiversity importance in the Coral Triangle.

Its capital and largest city is Cebu City, nicknamed "the Queen City of the South", is the oldest city and first capital of the Philippines, which is politically independent from the provincial government along with Mandaue and Lapu-Lapu City. The Cebu Metropolitan Area or Metro Cebu is the third largest metropolitan area in the Philippines (after Metro Manila and Metro Davao) with Cebu City as the main center of commerce, trade, education and industry in the Visayas as well as the regional center of Central Visayas. Being one of the most developed provinces in the Philippines, in a decade it has transformed into a global hub for business processing services, tourism, shipping, furniture-making, and heavy industry. Mactan–Cebu International Airport, located on Mactan Island, is the second busiest airport in the Philippines.

Cebu has the most combined cities and municipalities of any province in the Philippines, with 53 in total. With 9 cities in total, it has the second highest number of cities after its neighboring province of Negros Occidental.

== Etymology ==
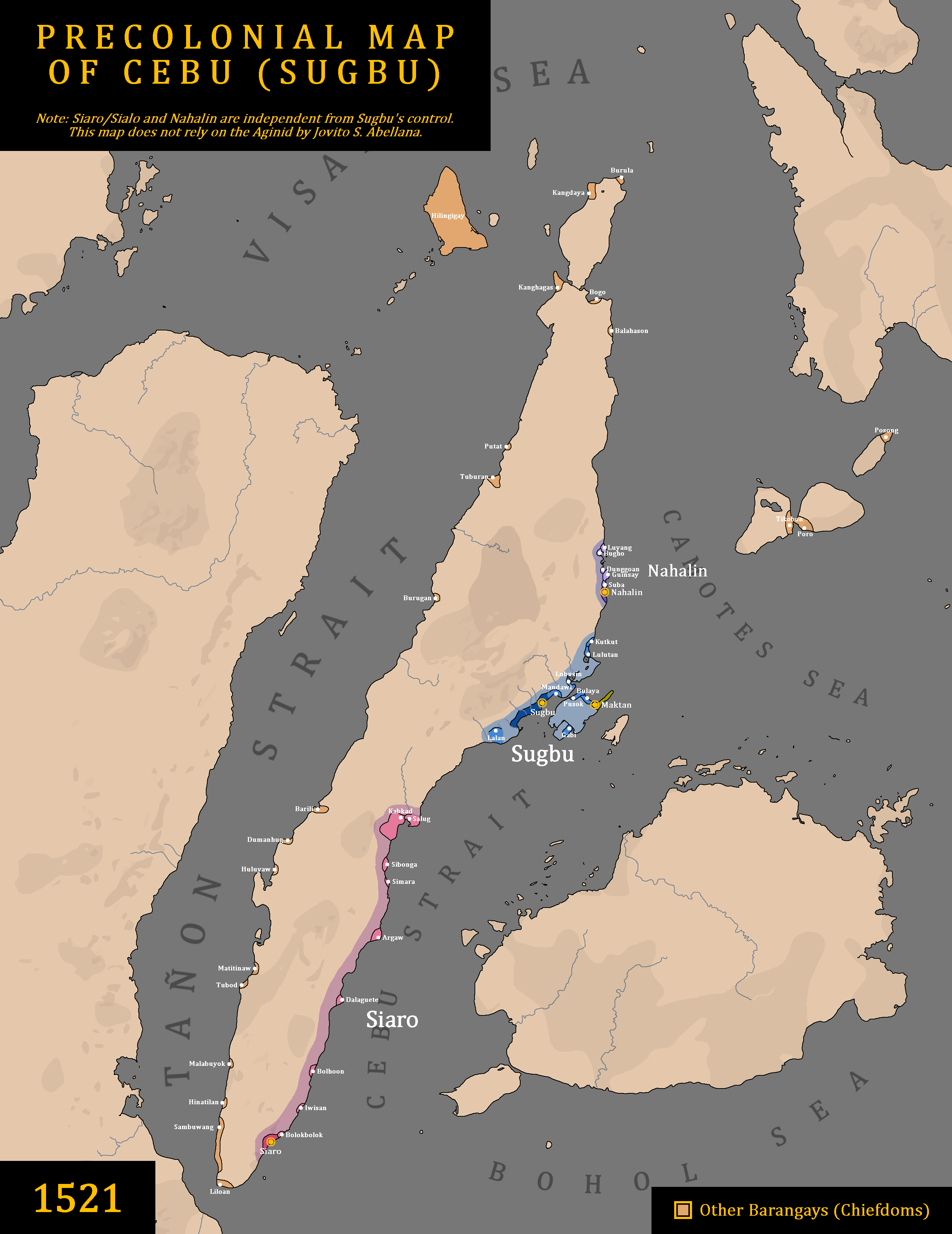
A map of Cebu Island in 1521, with the historical polity of Cebu colored in blue.

It is unclear whether the island was named sugbó or the settlement where Ferdinand Magellan's crew arrived in 1521. The capital city of the province is also named Cebu City.

The name is possibly derived from a hypothetical Proto-Philippine word *sug(e)bu meaning "to bathe" or "to wade into the water". The word has evolved in the Cebuano language as sugbú, meaning "to dive into water" and also exists in other Philippine languages such as Tagalog and Hiligaynon. In fact, there is also another municipality in Batangas, Philippines called Nasugbu, which may also share the same etymological root with the said province.

The modern name is most likely how the first Europeans heard of the name of the place in the 16th–17th centuries, as it was first recorded as Zubu or Çubu, and then eventually it became Cebu. The reason for the spelling change is because Visayans were mostly illiterate in the 16th and 17th centuries.

== History ==
=== Early history ===
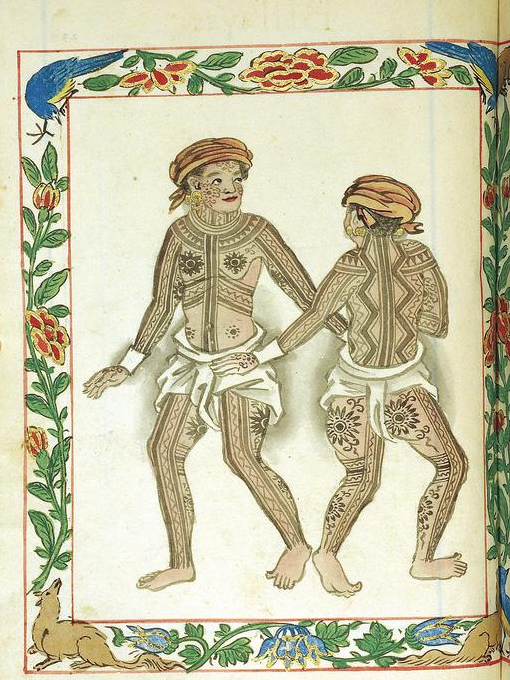
Depiction of the Bisayan tattooed men, known then as timawa in the Boxer Codex (c. 1590). Cebu was one of the islands referred where "painted people" (referring to the tattoos) resided.

Cebu was a native kingdom that existed prior to the arrival of the Spaniards. Visayan folklore relates it was founded by Sri Lumay otherwise known as Rajamuda Lumaya, a half-Malay, half-Tamil from Sumatra. The capital of the nation was Singhapala (சிங்கப்பூர்) which is Tamil-Sanskrit for "Lion City", the same root word as with the modern city-state of Singapore. The later Spanish chronicler Antonio Pigafetta mispronounced Singhapala as Cingopola instead.

=== Spanish Colonial Period ===
==== Report from the Magellan Expedition ====
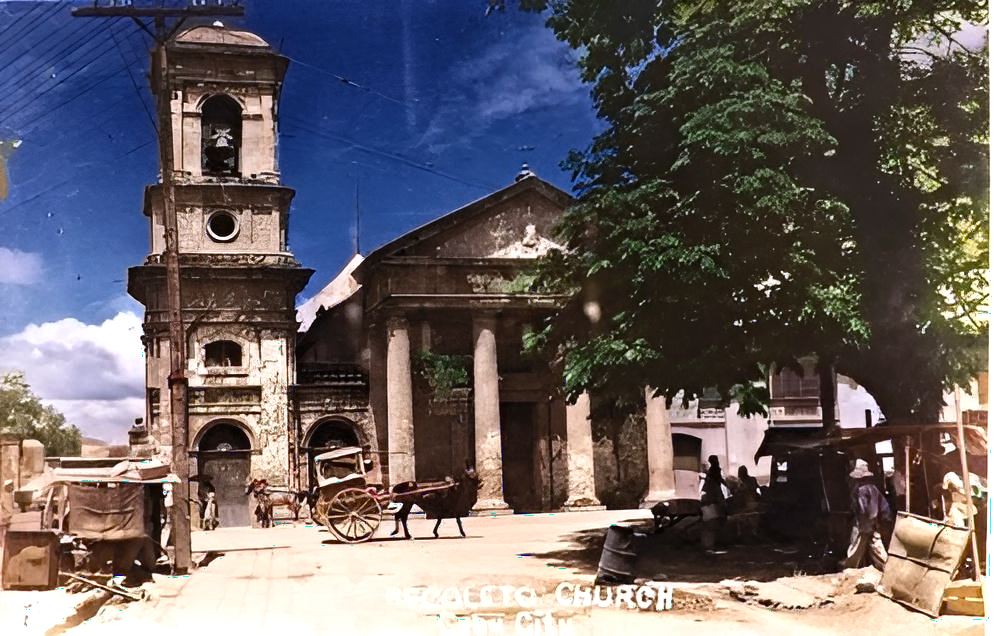
The old Recoletos Church of Cebu

The arrival of Portuguese explorer Ferdinand Magellan in 1521 began a period of Spanish exploration and colonization. Losing the favor of King Manuel I of Portugal for his plan of reaching the Spice Islands by sailing west from Europe, Magellan offered his services to King Charles I of Spain (Charles V, Holy Roman Emperor). On September 20, 1519, Magellan led five ships with a total complement of 250 people from the Spanish fort of Sanlúcar de Barrameda en route to southeast Asia via the Americas and the Pacific Ocean. They reached the Philippines on March 16, 1521. Rajah Kolambu, the rajah of Mazaua told them to sail for Cebu, where they could trade and obtain provisions.

Arriving in Cebu City, Magellan, with Enrique of Malacca as a translator, befriended Rajah Humabon a chief of a village in Cebu, and persuaded the natives to ally themselves with the Spanish. On April 14, Magellan erected a large wooden cross on the shores of Cebu. Afterwards, Rajah Humabon was baptized along with about 400 Sugbuanons.

Magellan soon heard of Datu Lapu-Lapu, a native chief in nearby Mactan Island, a rival of a chief in Cebu. It was thought that Humabon and Lapu–Lapu had been fighting for control of the flourishing trade in the area. On April 27 the Battle of Mactan occurred, where the Spaniards were defeated and Magellan was killed by the natives of Mactan in Mactan Island. According to Italian historian and chronicler Antonio Pigafetta, Magellan's body was never recovered despite efforts to trade it for spice and jewels. Magellan's second-in-command, Juan Sebastián Elcano, took his place as captain of the expedition and sailed the fleet back to Spain, circumnavigating the world.

Survivors of the Magellan expedition returned to Spain with tales of a savage island in the East Indies. Consequently, several Spanish expeditions were sent to the islands but all ended in failure.

==== Report from the Legazpi Expedition ====
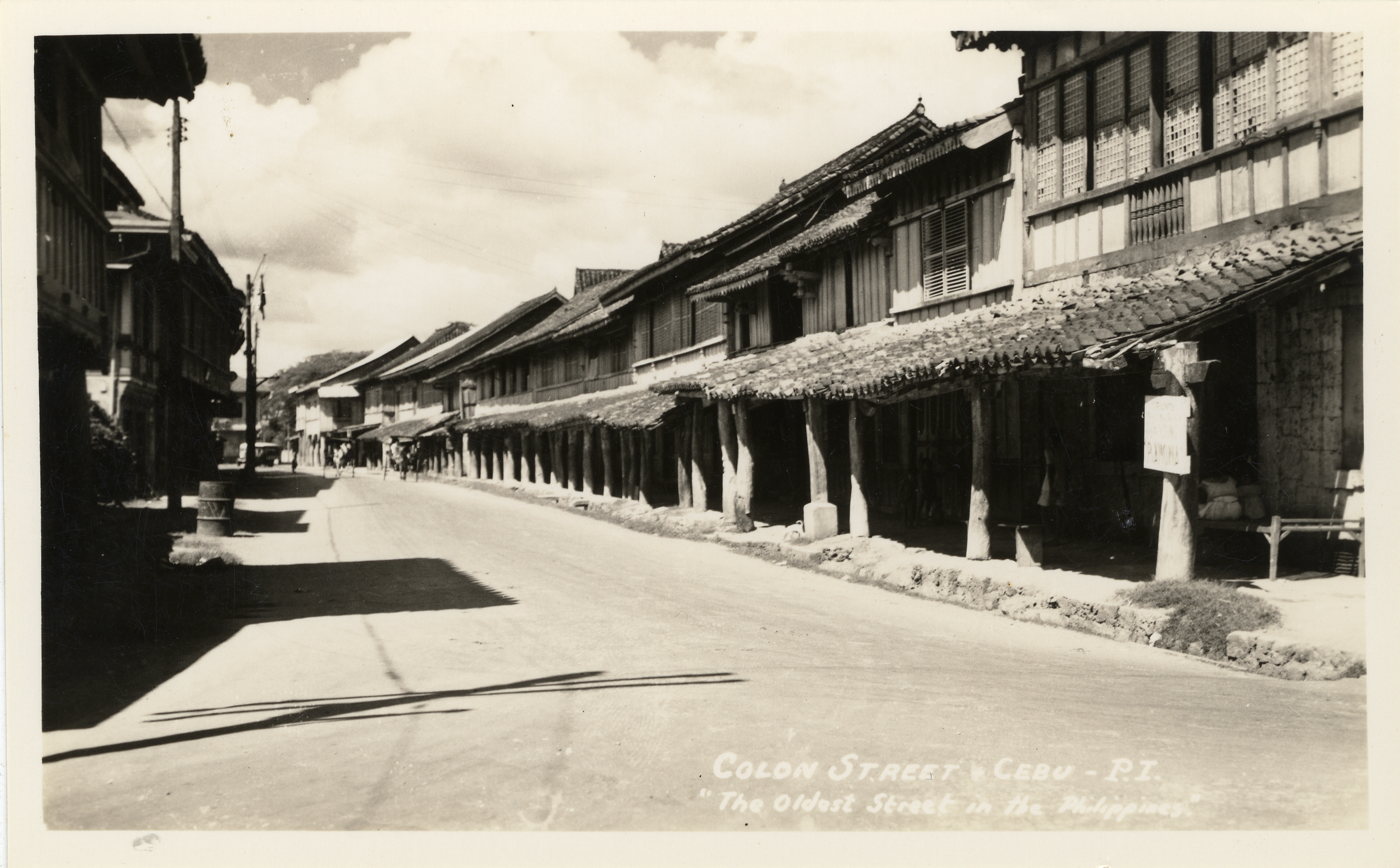
Calle Colon in Cebu City is one of the oldest street in the Philippines

On April 27, 1565 Miguel López de Legazpi arrived on the island, and though he also intended to make peace, he was also prepared for a war since these were the same people that had killed Magellan 44 years prior. According to the report, a messenger went to the Spanish ship and informed them that Tupas and "along with 10 other chiefs" would be out to either make negotiations or as a warning to prepare for an upcoming battle. Despite trying to assure the natives that the Spanish were there with good intentions, the natives already armed themselves, both parties were reported to have taunted each other offshore. Legazpi aimed the artillery on the proas which briefly confused the opposing natives causing them to run into the woods thus making the shore clear for the Spanish to land. Salvaging any valuable item that could be found, Juan de Camuz came across an image of the Child Jesus, which was probably the one Magellan presented to the consort of the chief in 1521. From then on, a church was built on the site which would later become the Minor Basilica of the Holy Child. Twelve days later, on May 8, a fort was established and while the construction was ongoing, the natives frequently launched attacks but were always repulsed until eventually they gave in as soon as they realized the superior armament of the Europeans. Legazpi dealt only with Tupas, after a brief "trial" on grounds of apostasy and Magellan's murder, the Europeans pardoned the natives' chief and included the natives. After the exchange, the two parties then discussed the terms and conditions including confirmation of titles, who receives tax exemptions, land grants, authority and recognition of officials. The crew then left Cebu on June 1, 1565.

In the 1700s, Cebu housed 625 Spanish Filipino families and 28,112 native families There were 5 Conquistadors from Latin America that were given encomiendas in the region of Cebu. First was Adelantado Miguel Lopez de Legaspi, leader of the expedition from Mexico, he was given a large encomienda of an unknown number of Filipino tributaries. Next, is Jerónimo de Monzón, whose number of tributes was also not specifically cited. Cristóbal Sánchez, was mentioned next, with 3000 native Cebuano tributes, Followed by, Francisco Carreño with about 2000 Cebuano tributes, Afterwards, Andrés de Mirandaola with 1,000 tributes which are also in Cebu, and finally Pedro Arana, whose precise number of tributes are not specifically quantified. All of these Mexican conquistadors were given lands and encomiendas in and around the region of Cebu.

By the time of the 1818 census, the native Filipino families numbered 31,134 while the number of Spanish-Filipino families that settled in the archdiocese of Cebu increased to 631. Their number and cities or municipalities of residency are as follows: the distribution was centered primarily in Cebu City (Fort San Pedro) with 233 families, and the separate city of the Parián (The Chinatown) with 109, other notable concentrations included 75 families on Bantayan Island, 69 in Samboan, 57 in Danao, 20 in Mandaue, and 14 in Barili. This total also encompasses Spanish-Filipino families residing in the subordinate islands of Bohol, Siquijor, Dauis, and the Camotes Islands.

=== American colonial period ===
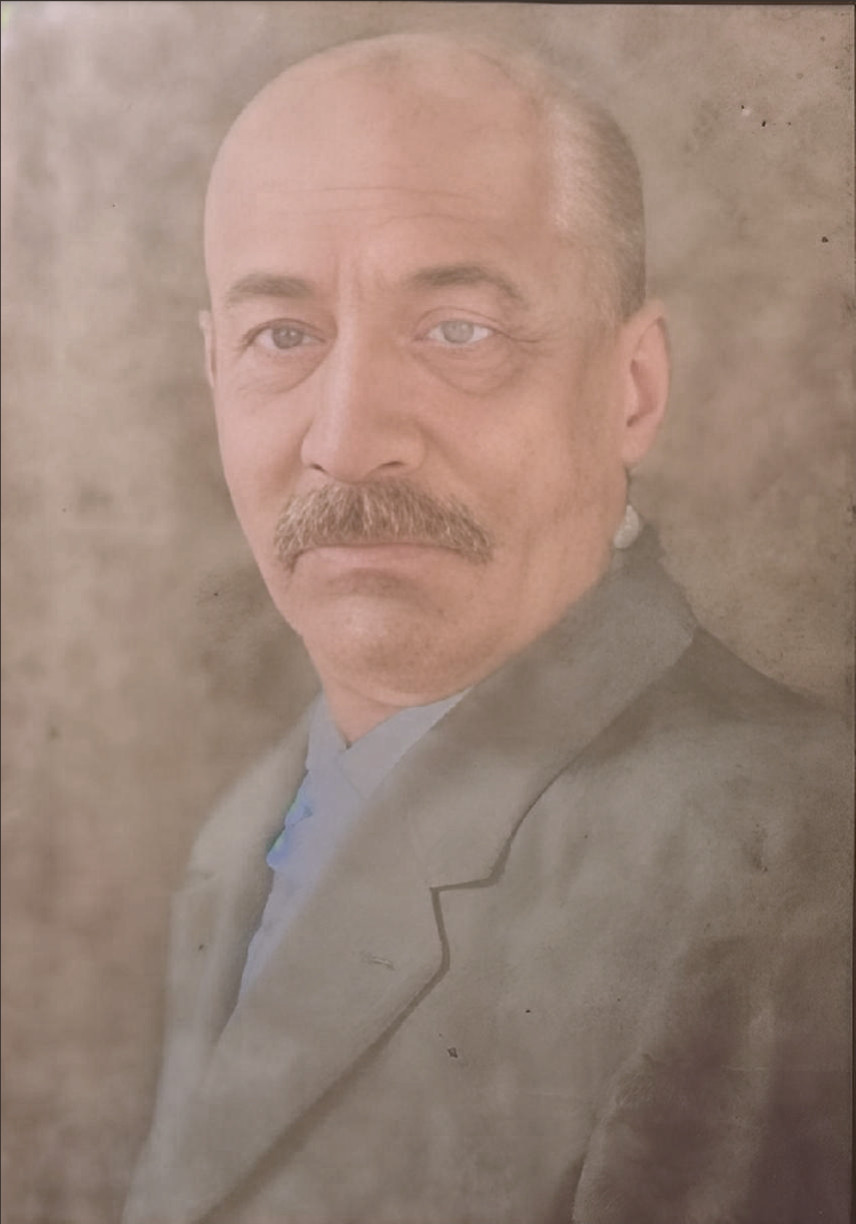
Julio A. Llorente, The 1st Governor of Cebu.

In 1898, the island was ceded to the United States after the Spanish–American War and Philippine–American War. In 1901, Cebu was governed by the United States for a brief period, however, it became a chartered city on February 24, 1937, and was governed independently by Filipino politicians.

=== Japanese occupation ===
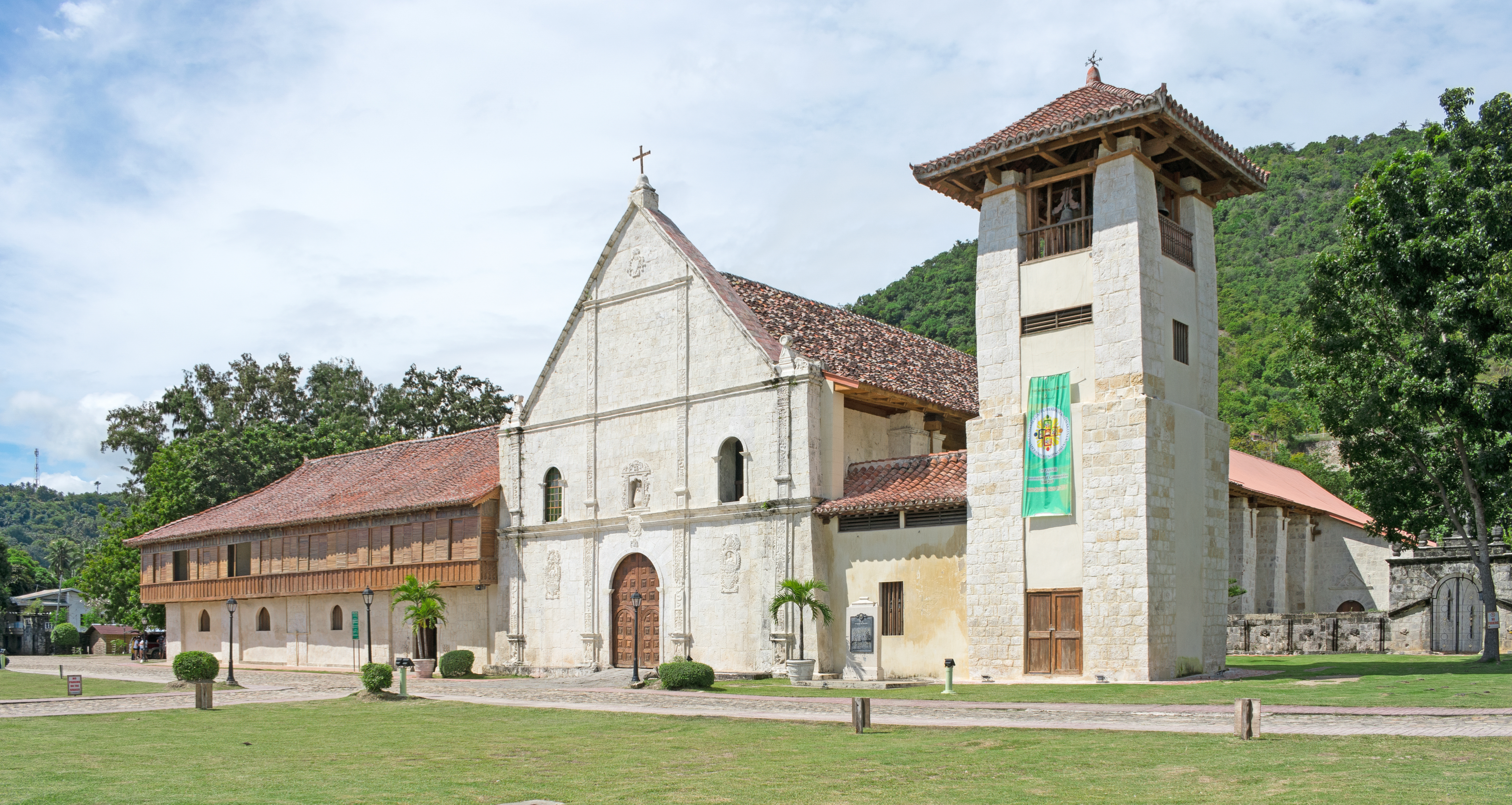
In 2009 Japanese – Filipino archaeologists in Boljoon discovered ancient Japanese pottery that has been believed to have been in existence since the early trading activity between Japan and Cebu in the 16th to 18th century.

Cebu, being one of the most densely populated islands in the Philippines, served as a Japanese base during their occupation in World War II which began with the landing of Japanese soldiers in April 1942. A Japanese businessman established Cebu's first "comfort station" during the war, where Japanese soldiers routinely gang-raped, humiliated, and murdered kidnapped girls and teenagers who they forced into sexual slavery under the brutal "comfort women" system. The 3rd, 8th, 82nd and 85th Infantry Division of the Philippine Commonwealth Army was re-established from January 3, 1942, to June 30, 1946, and the 8th Constabulary Regiment of the Philippine Constabulary was reestablished again from October 28, 1944, to June 30, 1946, at the military general headquarters and the military camps and garrisoned in Cebu city and Cebu province. They started the Anti-Japanese military operations in Cebu from April 1942 to September 1945 and helped Cebuano guerrillas and fought against the Japanese Imperial forces. Almost three years later in March 1945, combined Filipino and American forces landed and reoccupied the island during the liberation of the Philippines. Cebuano guerrilla groups led by an American, James M. Cushing, is credited for the establishment of the "Koga Papers", which is said to have changed the American plans to retake the Philippines from Japanese occupation in 1944, by helping the combined United States and the Philippine Commonwealth Army forces enter Cebu in 1945. The following year the island achieved independence from colonial rule in 1946.

=== Martial law era ===
Cebu became a key center of resistance against the Marcos dictatorship, first becoming apparent when the hastily put-together lineup of Pusyon Bisaya defeated the entire slate of Marcos' Kilusang Bagong Lipunan (KBL) in Region VII.

Among the Cebuanos immediately arrested by the Marcos dictatorship when martial law was announced on September 23, 1972, were columnist and future National Artist Resil Mojares and human rights lawyer and Carcar Vice Mayor Democrito Barcenas, who were both detained at Camp Sergio Osmeña.

One of the Marcos Martial Law Desaparecidos from Cebu was Redemptorist Priest Fr. Rudy Romano, a prominent Marcos critic and Executive Secretary of Cebu's Coalition against People's Persecution, who was accosted by armed men in Tisa, Labangon, Cebu City on June 11, 1985, and never seen again. Levi Ybañez, Romano's colleague in the Coalition against People's Persecution, was abducted on the same day as Fr. Romano, and was also never heard from again. Ribomapil Holganza, a prominent leader of Cebu's opposition was also arrested together with his son on Christmas Day, December 25, 1983, on political charges. He was subsequently released and cleared of all charges.

The Marcos era was a time of significant deforestation in Cebu and throughout the Philippines, with the forest cover of the Philippines shrinking until only 8% remained. In Cebu, two of the major companies given Timber License Agreements (TLAs) to cut down trees during Martial Law were Eurasia Match and Pan Oriental, which were owned by Juan Ponce Enrile. Enrile was the government official Ferdinand Marcos put in place to approve Timber License Agreements during Martial Law.

=== Role in the People Power Revolution ===
Later, Cebu would play a key role in the days leading up to the 1986 People Power revolution and the ouster of Marcos. It was from Fuente Osmeña circle in Cebu City that the opposition forces relaunched the Civil Disobedience Campaign against the Marcos regime and its cronies on February 22, 1986. After that, the Carmelite Monastery in Barangay Mabolo, Cebu City, served as a refuge for opposition candidates Corazon Aquino and Salvador Laurel during the first day of the People Power revolution, because it was not yet safe to go back to Manila.

=== Contemporary ===
In 2007, the municipalities of Bogo, Carcar, and Naga became component cities. Their respective cityhood laws were ratified in the same year. However, their cityhood status was lost twice in the years 2008 and 2010 after the LCP questioned the validity of the cityhood laws. Their cityhood status was reaffirmed after the court finalized its ruling on February 15, 2011, declaring their respective cityhood laws constitutional.

In February 2012, Cebu island experienced the effects of magnitude 6.7 earthquake on the neighboring island of Negros and was the largest quake in the area for 90 years. The tremor shook buildings but there were no reports of major building damage or loss of life on Cebu Island itself. This tremor was caused by a previously unrecorded fault.

In October 2013, Cebu and Bohol were hit by a record-setting 7.2 magnitude earthquake which left 222 dead and collapsed some buildings, including 5 historical churches. There were over 700 aftershocks. The northern part of the province was devastated by Typhoon Haiyan a month later.

In December 2021, Typhoon Rai wreaked havoc across the province, leading to a declaration of "calamity" by the government.

On September 30, 2025, northern Cebu was struck by an earthquake with a magnitude of 6.9, with dozens of fatalities and hundreds of injured.

== Geography ==
Cebu Island
Sugbo
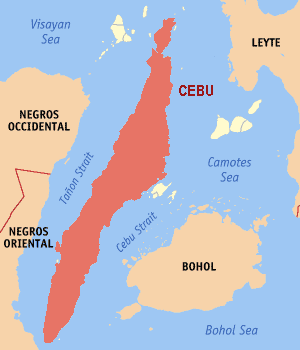

Geography
- Location: Visayas
- Archipelago: Philippines
- Adjacent to: Camotes Sea; Visayan Sea; Cebu Strait; Tañon Strait
- Area: 4,467.5 km^{2} (1,724.9 sq mi)
- Length: 196 km (121.8 mi)
- Width: 32 km (19.9 mi)
- Coastline: 513.9 km (319.32 mi)
- Highest elevation: 1,097 m (3599 ft)

Administration
- Philippines
- Region: Central Visayas
- Province: Cebu

Demographics
- Demonym: Cebuanos (masculine) / Cebuanas (feminine)
- Population: 2,458,747 (2024 census)
- Pop. density: 550/km^{2} (1420/sq mi)
- Ethnic groups: Visayans (Cebuanos)

Cebu is located to the east of Negros, to the west of Leyte and Bohol islands. The province consists of Cebu Island, as well as 167 smaller islands, which include Mactan, Bantayan, Malapascua, Olango and the Camotes Islands. But the highly urbanized cities of Cebu, Lapu-Lapu and Mandaue are independent cities not under provincial supervision, yet are often grouped with the province for geographical and statistical purposes.

The province's land area is 4,944 square kilometers (1,909 sq mi), or when the three independent cities (Cebu City, Lapu-Lapu and Mandaue) are included for geographical purposes, the total area is 5,342 square kilometers (2,063 sq mi).

Cebu's central location, proximity to an exotic tourist destination, ready access to a diversity of plant, animal and geological wonders within the island, and remoteness from earthquake and typhoon activity are some of the attributes of Cebu.

=== Cebu Island ===
Cebu Island is the 126th largest island in the world. Cebu Island itself is long and narrow, stretching 196 kilometers (122 mi) from north to south and 32 kilometers (20 mi) across at its widest point. It has narrow coastlines, limestone plateaus, and coastal plains. It also has rolling hills and rugged mountain ranges traversing the northern and southern lengths of the island.

Cebu's highest mountains are over 1,000 metres (3,300 ft) high. Flat tracts of land can be found in the city of Bogo and in the towns of San Remigio, Medellin and Daanbantayan at the northern region of the province.

The island's area is 4,468 square kilometres (1,725 sq mi), making it the 9th largest island in the Philippines. It supports over 5.2 million people, of which an estimated 2.9 million live in Metro Cebu.

Beaches, coral atolls, islands, and rich fishing grounds surround Cebu.

Coal was first discovered in Cebu about 1837. There were 15 localities over the whole island, on both coasts; some desultory mining had been carried out Naga near Mount Uling, but most serious operations were at Licos and Camansi west of Compostela and Danao. Active work ceased about 1895 with the insurrections, and no production was worked on for more than ten years. A topographic and geologic survey of Compostela, Danao, and Carmen took place in 1906. The Compostela-Danao coalfield contained about six million workable tons. The tramroads, one from Danao to Camansi, one from Compostela to Mount Licos, were undertaken in 1895, together with a wagon road built in 1877, from Cotcot to Dapdap.

=== Climate ===
The climate of Cebu is tropical. There are 2 seasons in Cebu − the dry and wet season. It is dry and sunny most of the year with some occasional rains during the months of June to December. The province of Cebu normally gets typhoons once a year or none.

Northern Cebu gets more rainfall and typhoons than southern Cebu because it has a different climate. Typhoon Haiyan (Yolanda) hit Northern Cebu in 2013 killing 73 people and injuring 348 others. Though most typhoons hit only the northern part of Cebu, the urban areas in central Cebu are sometimes hit, such as when Typhoon Mike (Ruping), one of the worst to hit Cebu lashed the central Cebu area in 1990. 31 years later, Typhoon Rai struck the central and southern portions of the province.

Cebu's temperatures can reach a high of 36 °C (97 °F) from March to May, and as low as 18 °C (64 °F) in the mountains during the wet season. The average temperature is around 24 to 34 °C (75 to 93 °F), and does not fluctuate much except during the month of May, which is the hottest month. Cebu averages 70–80% humidity.

=== Fauna ===
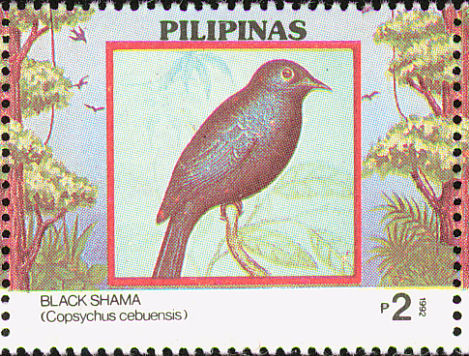
Copsychus cebuensis, the Black Shama (locally called Siloy), is a species of Shama bird that is only found in the island of Cebu. It is currently endangered. It has been observed as far in urban areas as Cebu City, but is mainly abundant in the species' last stronghold, the Nug-as rainforest of Alcoy. It can also be found in Casili, Consolacion and the mountainous areas of the Trans Central Highway. The bird was once featured on the official stamp of Cebu of 1992.

Endemic species in Cebu include the Cebu Flowerpecker (Dicaeum quadricolor), Cebu Slender Skink (Brachymeles cebuensis), Uling Goby (Sicyopus cebuensis), and Black Shama (Copsychus cebuensis).

There is also a subspecies of Idea leuconoe that is only endemic to Cebu. I. l. jumaloni is endemic to the area of Kawasan Falls in Badian, hence its common name, the Kawasan Paper Kite Butterfly. The subspecies is also named after Julian Jumalon, a Cebuano Lepidopterist and butterfly artist. The butterfly can also be observed in the Nug-as rainforest.

=== Flora ===
Cebu has little remaining forest cover. The remaining forest patches in Cebu are composed primarily of the following tree species.

- Mount Lantoy: Carallia brachiata and introduced species Tectona grandis, Swietenia macrophylla, Gmelina arborea, and Casuarina equisetifolia
- Palinipinon Mountains: Carallia brachiata and introduced species Swietenia macrophylla
- Nug-as forest: Ficus spp., Artocarpus blancoi, Macaranga grandifolia, and Cinnamomum cebuense
- Mount Lanaya: Carallia brachiata
- Mount Tabunan: Trevesia burckii, Voacanga globosa, Heptapleurum actinophyllum, Pouteria villamilii, and Palaquium luzoniense

=== Administrative divisions ===
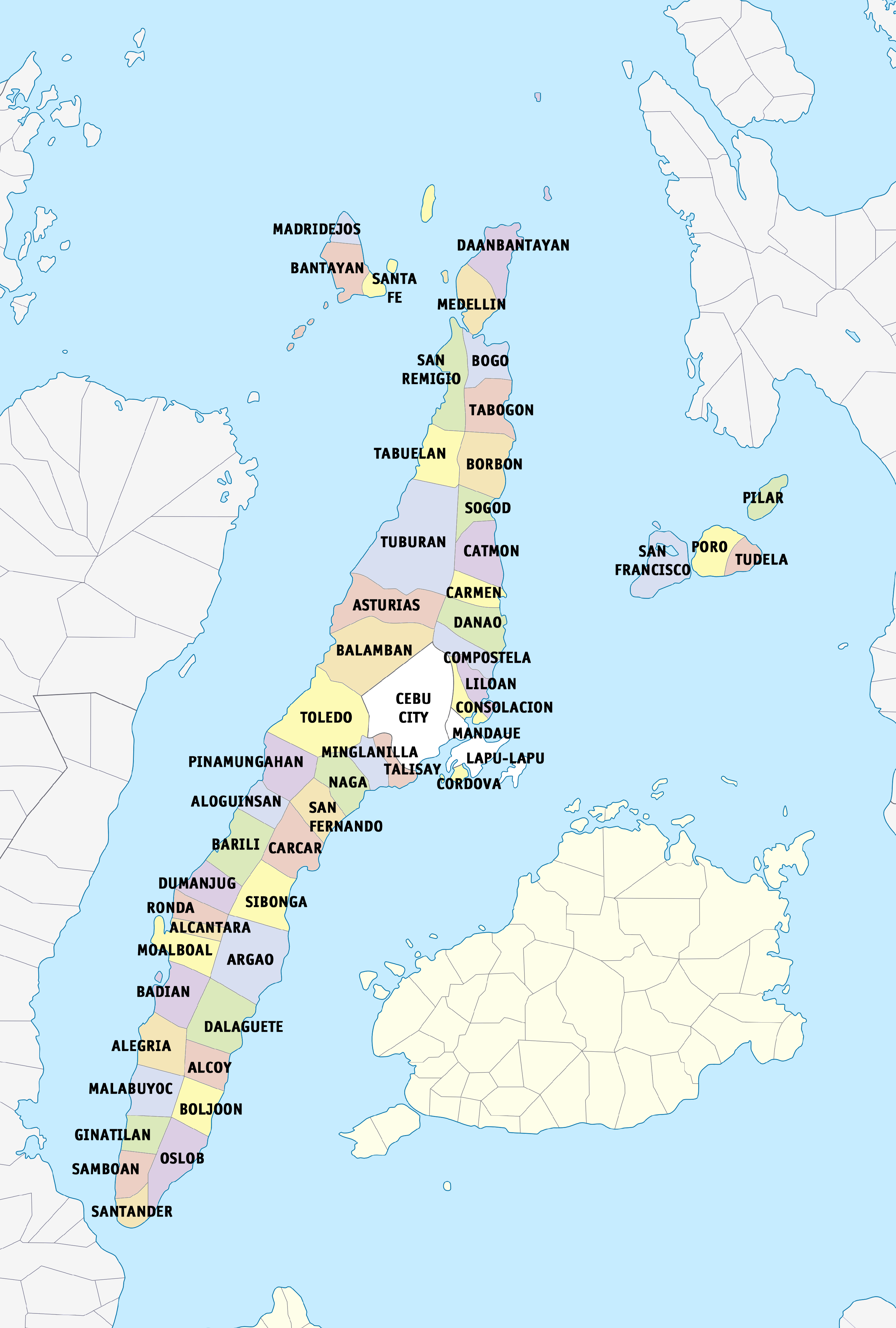

The province of Cebu has 3 highly urbanized cities (Cebu (the provincial capital), Lapu-Lapu, and Mandaue) which are geographically grouped but governed independent from the province, 6 component cities (Bogo, Carcar, Danao, Naga, Talisay, and Toledo), and 44 municipalities for a total of 53 units as listed below:

PSGC	City or Municipality	Population			±% p.a.		Area		PD 2024	
		2024		2010			km2	sq mi	/km^{2}	/sq mi
072201000	Alcantara	1.2%	17,490	13,556	▴	1.77%	35.20	13.59	500	1,300
072202000	Alcoy	1.4%	19,207	14,757	▴	1.83%	61.63	23.80	310	810
072203000	Alegria	1.9%	26,520	22,072	▴	1.27%	89.49	34.55	300	770
072204000	Aloguinsan	2.5%	34,990	27,650	▴	1.63%	61.92	23.91	570	1,500
072205000	Argao	5.5%	78,111	69,503	▴	0.81%	191.50	73.94	410	1,100
072206000	Asturias	3.9%	54,777	44,732	▴	1.40%	190.45	73.53	290	740
072207000	Badian	3.2%	44,626	37,699	▴	1.17%	110.07	42.50	410	1,100
072208000	Balamban	6.9%	98,170	71,237	▴	2.23%	333.56	128.79	290	760
072209000	Bantayan	6.2%	87,394	74,785	▴	1.08%	81.68	31.54	1,100	2,800
072210000	Barili	5.8%	82,427	65,524	▴	1.59%	122.21	47.19	670	1,700
072211000	Bogo	6.4%	90,187	69,911	▴	1.76%	103.52	39.97	870	2,300
072212000	Boljoon	1.2%	17,153	14,877	▴	0.98%	117.00	45.17	150	380
072213000	Borbon	2.8%	40,097	32,278	▴	1.50%	120.94	46.70	330	860
072214000	Carcar	9.9%	140,308	100,632	▴	2.31%	116.78	45.09	1,200	3,100
072215000	Carmen	4.3%	60,230	41,279	▴	2.63%	84.78	32.73	710	1,800
072216000	Catmon	2.4%	34,608	27,330	▴	1.64%	109.64	42.33	320	820
072217000	Cebu City∞ †	68.3%	965,332	866,171	▴	0.75%	315.00	121.62	3,100	7,900
072218000	Compostela	4.1%	58,178	39,167	▴	2.76%	53.90	20.81	1,100	2,800
072219000	Consolacion	10.9%	153,931	106,649	▴	2.55%	37.03	14.30	4,200	11,000
072220000	Cordova	5.2%	72,915	50,353	▴	2.58%	17.15	6.62	4,300	11,000
072221000	Daanbantayan	6.7%	95,080	74,897	▴	1.65%	92.27	35.63	1,000	2,700
072222000	Dalaguete	5.4%	75,937	63,239	▴	1.26%	154.96	59.83	490	1,300
072223000	Danao	11.4%	161,307	119,252	▴	2.10%	107.30	41.43	1,500	3,900
072224000	Dumanjug	4.2%	59,954	46,754	▴	1.72%	85.53	33.02	700	1,800
072225000	Ginatilan	1.2%	17,184	15,327	▴	0.79%	70.10	27.07	250	630
072226000	Lapu-Lapu City	35.2%	497,813	350,467	▴	2.44%	58.10	22.43	8,600	22,000
072227000	Liloan	11.2%	158,387	100,500	▴	3.17%	45.92	17.73	3,400	8,900
072228000	Madridejos	3.0%	42,828	34,905	▴	1.42%	23.95	9.25	1,800	4,600
072229000	Malabuyoc	1.4%	20,378	18,426	▴	0.69%	69.27	26.75	290	760
072230000	Mandaue	25.8%	364,482	331,320	▴	0.66%	34.87	13.46	10,000	27,000
072231000	Medellin	4.4%	62,163	50,047	▴	1.50%	73.19	28.26	850	2,200
072232000	Minglanilla	11.0%	155,934	113,178	▴	2.23%	65.60	25.33	2,400	6,200
072233000	Moalboal	2.7%	37,993	27,676	▴	2.20%	124.86	48.21	300	790
072234000	Naga	9.8%	138,727	101,571	▴	2.16%	101.97	39.37	1,400	3,500
072235000	Oslob	2.1%	29,378	26,116	▴	0.81%	134.75	52.03	220	560
072236000	Pilar	0.9%	12,454	11,564	▴	0.51%	32.42	12.52	380	990
072237000	Pinamungajan	5.4%	76,568	57,997	▴	1.93%	109.16	42.15	700	1,800
072238000	Poro	1.9%	26,908	23,498	▴	0.94%	63.59	24.55	420	1,100
072239000	Ronda	1.5%	21,179	18,582	▴	0.90%	57.10	22.05	370	960
072240000	Samboan	1.5%	20,736	18,613	▴	0.74%	45.16	17.44	460	1,200
072241000	San Fernando	5.4%	76,110	60,970	▴	1.54%	69.39	26.79	1,100	2,800
072242000	San Francisco	4.3%	61,092	47,357	▴	1.76%	106.93	41.29	570	1,500
072243000	San Remigio	4.8%	67,850	51,394	▴	1.93%	95.27	36.78	710	1,800
072244000	Santa Fe	2.5%	34,834	27,270	▴	1.70%	28.05	10.83	1,200	3,200
072245000	Santander	1.3%	18,669	16,105	▴	1.02%	35.67	13.77	520	1,400
072246000	Sibonga	3.9%	54,610	43,641	▴	1.55%	133.45	51.53	410	1,100
072247000	Sogod	2.9%	40,746	30,626	▴	1.98%	119.23	46.03	340	890
072248000	Tabogon	3.0%	42,066	33,024	▴	1.68%	101.35	39.13	420	1,100
072249000	Tabuelan	2.1%	29,662	22,292	▴	1.98%	141.13	54.49	210	540
072250000	Talisay	18.7%	263,832	200,772	▴	1.89%	39.87	15.39	6,600	17,000
072251000	Toledo	14.6%	206,692	157,078	▴	1.90%	216.28	83.51	960	2,500
072252000	Tuburan	4.8%	68,307	58,914	▴	1.02%	224.50	86.68	300	790
072253000	Tudela	0.8%	11,638	9,859	▴	1.15%	33.02	12.75	350	910
	TOTAL		1,412,726	2,619,362	▾	−4.15%	4,943.72	1,908.8	290	750
† Provincial capital Highly Urbanized City Municipality Component city

∞ Largest settlement

== Demographics ==
Population census of Cebu

Year	Pop.	±% p.a.
1903	653,727	—
1918	855,065	+1.81%
1939	1,068,078	+1.06%
1948	1,123,107	+0.56%
1960	1,332,847	+1.44%
1970	1,170,386	−1.29%
1975	1,264,357	+1.56%
1980	1,410,346	+2.21%

Year	Pop.	±% p.a.
1990	1,732,386	+2.08%
1995	1,890,357	+1.65%
2000	2,160,569	+2.91%
2007	2,440,120	+1.69%
2010	2,619,362	+2.61%
2015	2,938,982	+2.22%
2020	3,325,385	+2.63%
2024	3,400,522	+0.54%

Excludes independent cities
Source: Philippine Statistics Authority

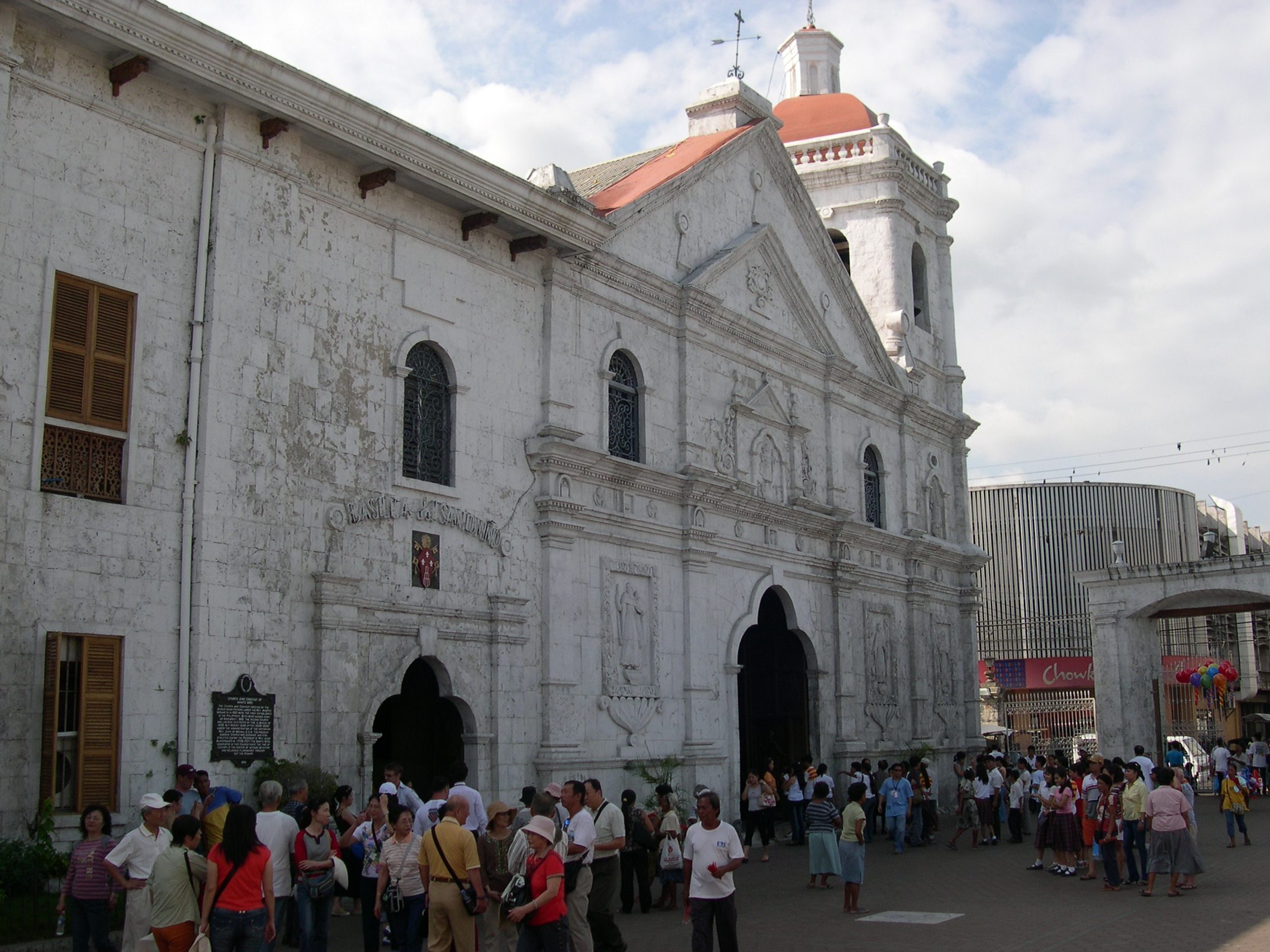
The Basílica Minore del Santo Niño in Cebu, the first church built in the Philippines. Named by the Holy See as the "Mother and Head... of all Churches of the Philippine Islands".

The population of Cebu province, according to the 2024 census, was 3,400,522 with a density of 670 inhabitants per square kilometre or 1,700 inhabitants per square mile. When the independent cities – Cebu City (964,169), Lapu-Lapu (497,604), and Mandaue (364,116) – are included for geographical purposes, the total population is 5,151,274 people, with a population density of 964 inhabitants per square kilometre (2,498/sq mi).

The population of the Central Visayas is predominantly young with about 37 percent of its population below 10 years old. This is very evident in the very broad base of the population pyramid in the region which has prevailed since 1970 but at a declining rate. A decline of 2.29 percentage points in the proportion of the household population below 15 years old was noted from 1980 to 1995. Conversely, an increase of 3.06 percentage points was observed in the 15–64 age group during the same period. The population of the region is evenly distributed between males and females. However, the male population in the region has been increasing at a faster rate compared to the female population.

In 2010, the median age of the population of the province was 23.0 years, which means that half of the population was younger than 23.0 years. This is higher than the median age of 20.8 years that was recorded in 2000.

=== Languages ===
Spoken Languages in Cebu Province
Languages	percentage
Cebuano/Bisaya/Binisaya/Boholano	98.8%
Hiligaynon	0.2%
Tagalog	0.2%
Others	0.8%

The Tagalog language has experienced a significant dilution in Metro Cebu, where the primary language spoken by most of the inhabitants is an urban variant of the Cebuano language. In the rest of Cebu Province, the population mainly consists of native bilingual speakers of Cebuano and Tagalog. Cebuano is also spoken in the other parts of Central Visayas and most parts of Eastern Visayas, as well as most provinces of Mindanao.

In the Camotes Islands, especially in Poro, people there speak their own Visayan language called Porohanon, which has Masbateño and Waray-Waray influences. Some of the residents in Bantayan islands also speak Bantayanon, a Visayan language related to Waray-Waray.

Chinese Filipinos also speak Philippine Hokkien privately amongst fellow speakers in Cebu, while Mandarin (Standard Chinese) is also taught in Chinese class of Chinese Filipino schools.

=== Religion ===
==== Catholicism ====
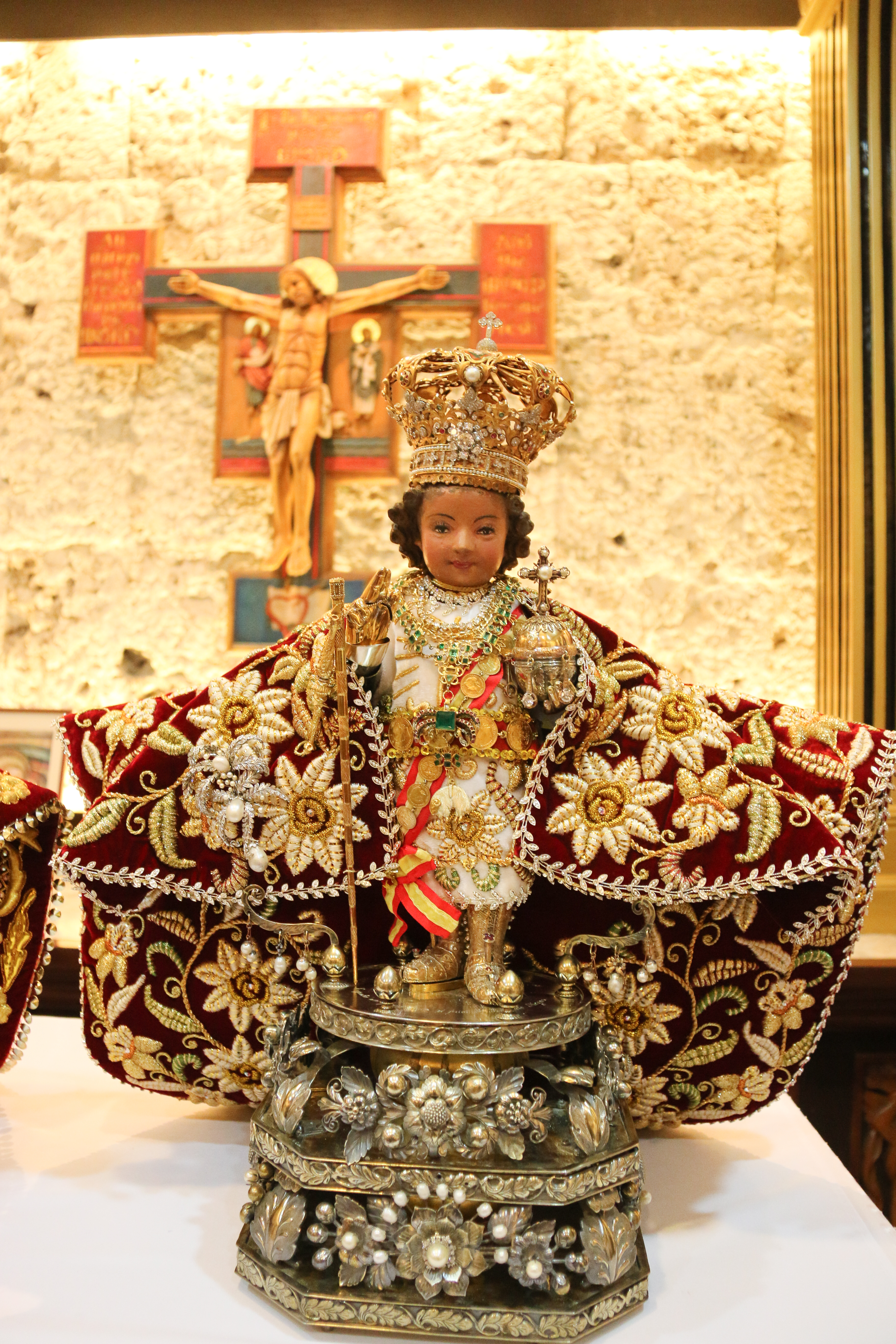
The original image of Santo Niño de Cebú, an image of the Child Jesus given by Ferdinand Magellan to Queen Juana and to the Cebuanos after the First Baptism, now enshrined at the Minor Basilica.

The majority of its population are Roman Catholic followed by roughly 95% of Cebuanos. There are also followers of Iglesia Filipina Independiente, Islam, Buddhism and Hinduism. The increasing members of the Iglesia ni Cristo in the province has 3 subdivided district (Bogo City, Carcar City and Cebu City) chapels, dominating each city and town, while barrio chapels have 2–3% presence in the entire province.

Cebu is the capital of the Catholic faith by virtue of being the first Christian city, the first capital of the Spanish East Indies, and the birthplace of Christianity and the Philippine Church. Pope John Paul II, in his Homily for Families in Cebu (February 19, 1981), called the island as the birthplace of Christianity in the Philippines. At over 3,000,000 adherents, the province of Cebu has the highest number of Roman Catholics out of any province in the Philippines.

The image of Santo Niño de Cebú (Holy Child of Cebu), the oldest Christian image in the Philippines, is enshrined and venerated at the Basilica Minore del Santo Niño. According to Philippine historical documents, the statue of the Santo Niño (Holy Child) was given to Queen Humamay (also referred to as Hara Amihan and Queen Juana), the wife of Rajah Humabon (also referred to as Rajah Carlos), the Rajah of Cebu by the Portuguese explorer Ferdinand Magellan. The Cebuanos' acceptance of Christianity is depicted in Cebu's cultural event, the Sinulog where street parades and loud drum beats preceded by a Christian Mass is celebrated every third Sunday of January. Cebu has a Roman Catholic Archdiocese and has several major churches, including the Basilica Minor del Santo Niño de Cebu, Cebu Metropolitan Cathedral, Santo Rosario Parish Church, San José–Recoletos Church, Sacred Heart Church, Archdiocesan Shrine of Our Lady of Lourdes, National Shrine of Our Lady of the Rule, National Shrine of Saint Joseph of Mandaue, Archdiocesan Shrine of Our Lady of Guadalupe of Cebu, San Nicolas de Tolentino Church, Archdiocesan Shrine of Patrocinio de Maria Santissima of Boljoon, and other Christian churches, as well as several other non-Catholic churches, mosques and temples.

== Government ==
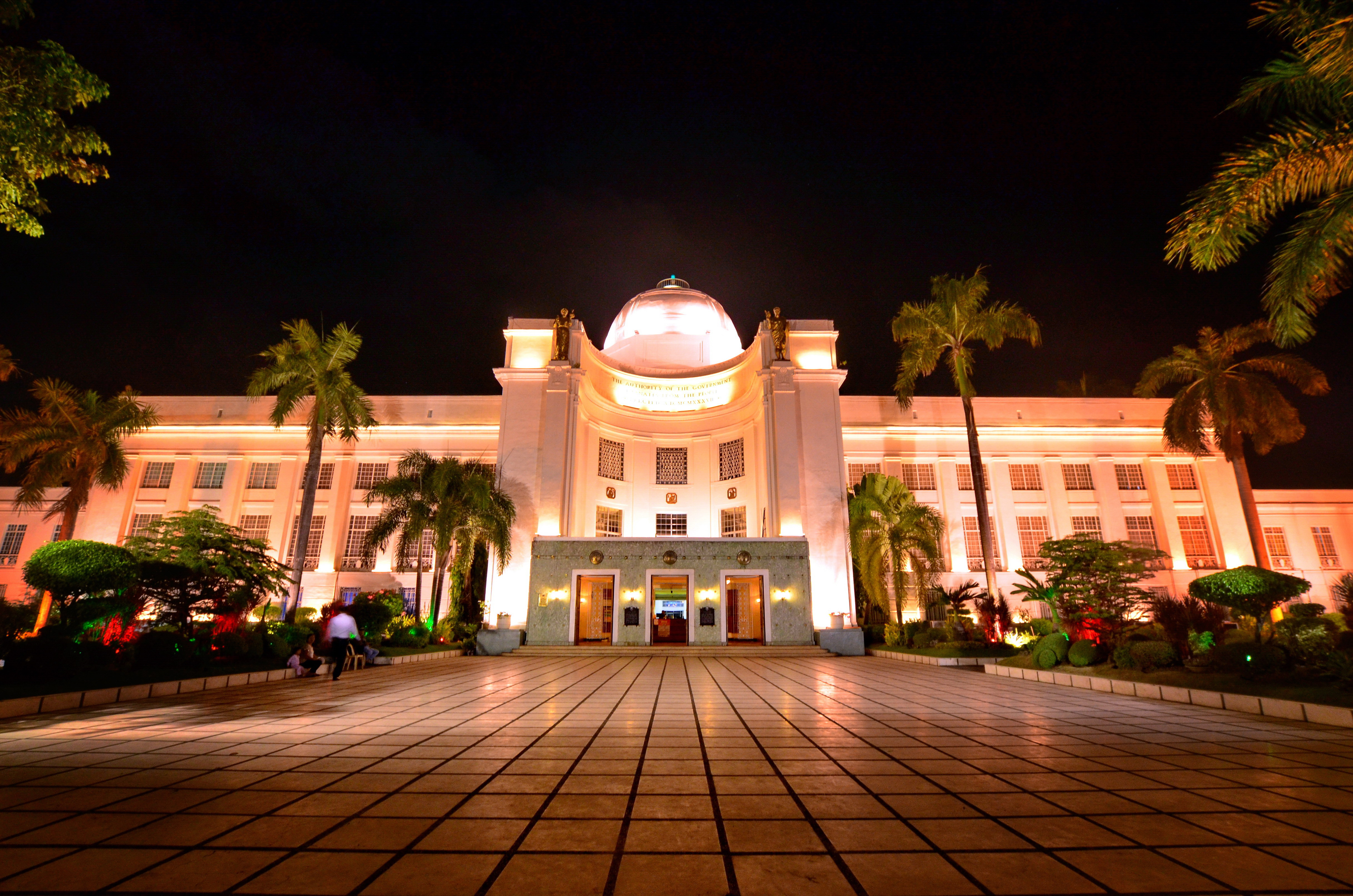
The Cebu Provincial Capitol is the official seat of the provincial government of Cebu.

CEBU PROVINCIAL GOVERNMENT OFFICIALS 2025–2028:

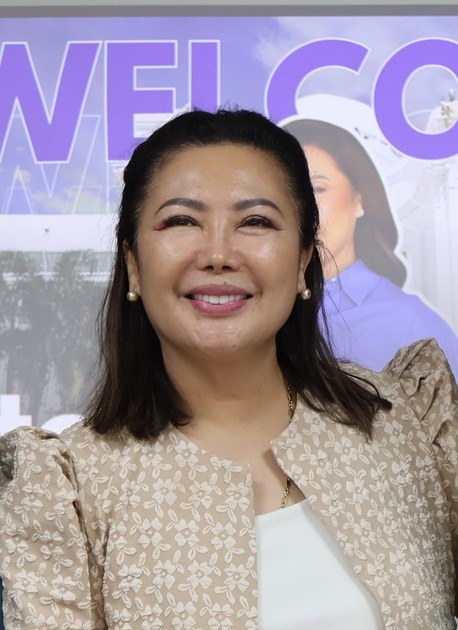
Pamela S. Baricuatro
Governor of Cebu

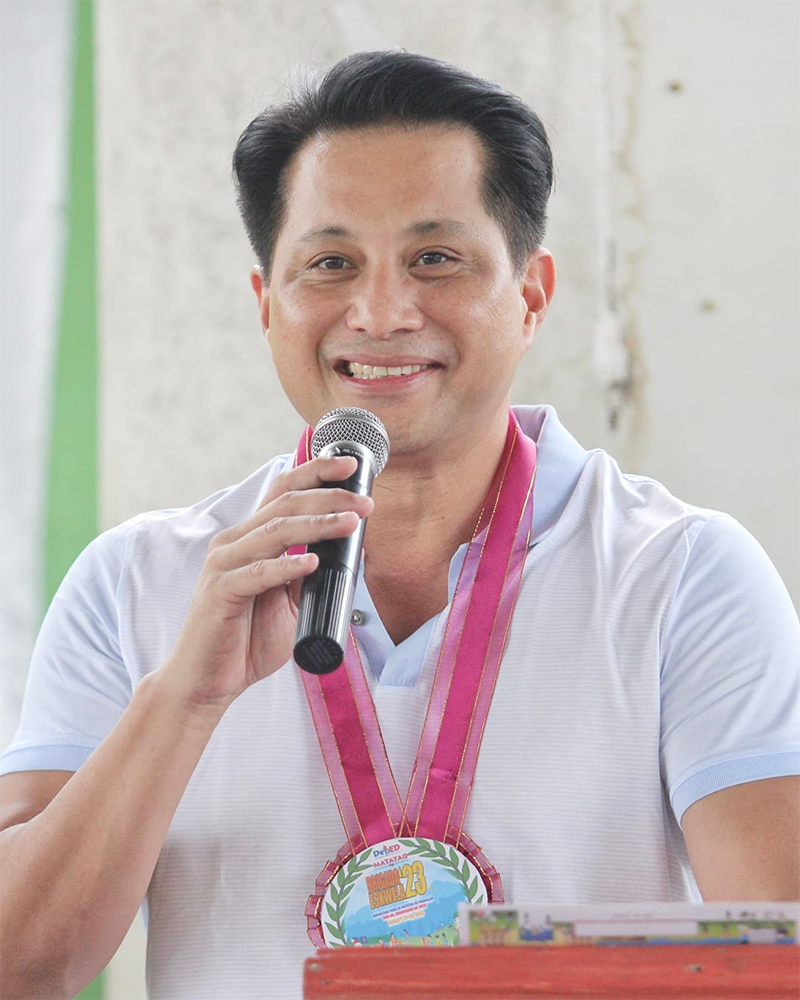
Glenn Anthony O. Soco
Vice Governor of Cebu

- Governor: Pamela S. Baricuatro (PDP)
- Vice Governor: Glenn Anthony O. Soco (1Cebu)
- Representatives:
  - 1st District: Rhea Mae A. Gullas (Lakas)
  - 2nd District: Edsel A. Galeos (Lakas)
  - 3rd District: Karen F. Garcia (NUP)
  - 4th District: Sun J. Shimura (PMP)
  - 5th District: Vincent Franco "Duke" D. Frasco (1Cebu)
  - 6th District: Daphne A. Lagon (Lakas)
  - 7th District: Dr. Patricia C. Calderon (NPC)
- Board Members:
  - 1st District:
    - Antonio "Jojo" D. Bacaltos Jr. (NP)
    - Lakambini G. Reluya (NP)
  - 2nd District:
    - Raymond Joseph D. Calderon (1Cebu)
    - Dr. Stanley S. Caminero (1Cebu)
  - 3rd District:
    - Julius Anthony "Oloy" G. Corominas (1Cebu)
    - Dason Lorenz A. Lagon (Lakas)
  - 4th District:
    - Kerrie Keane G. Shimura (1Cebu)
    - Nelson J. Mondigo (1Cebu)
  - 5th District:
    - Andrei "Red" Duterte (1Cebu)
    - Michael Joseph "Mike" T. Villamor (1Cebu)
  - 6th District:
    - Dason Larenz A. Lagon (1Cebu)
    - Alfred Francis "Alfie" M. Ouano (Lakas)
  - 7th District:
    - Paz "Lingling" A. Rozgoni (1Cebu)
    - Cesar "Sarsi" A. Baricuatro (1Cebu)
  - Mandaue City:
    - Malcolm A. Sanchez (1Cebu)
    - Nilo "Olin" V. Seno (Lakas)
  - Ex-Officio:
    - SK Federation President: Loren S. Singco (Independent)
    - ABC President: Celestino A. Martinez III (Independent)
    - PCL President: Ricardo "Nick" D. Pepito (1Cebu)

=== Former Governors of Cebu ===
- Julio Llorente (1900–1901)
- Juan Climaco (1902–1903)
- Sergio Osmeña (1904–1905)
- Dionisio Jakosalem (1907–1912)
- Manuel Roa (1912–1922)
- Arsenio Climaco (1923–1930)
- Mariano Jesus Cuenco (1931–1933)
- Sotero Cabahug (1934–1937)
- Buenaventura Rodriguez (1937–1940)
- Hilario Abellana (1941–1943)
- Jose Delgado (1943–1944) (Note: Appointed)
- Jose Leyson (1944–1945)
- Fructuoso Cabahug (1945–1946)
- Manuel Cuenco (1946–1951)
- Sergio Osmeña, Jr. (1952–1955)
- Jose Briones (1956–1961)
- Francisco Remotigue (1961–1963)
- Rene Espina (1964–1969)
- Osmundo Rama (1969–1976; 1986–1988)
- Eduardo Gullas (1976–1986)
- Lito Osmeña (1988–1992)
- Vicente de la Serna (1992–1995)
- Pablo Garcia (1995–2004)
- Gwendolyn Garcia (2004–2013; 2019–2025)
- Hilario Davide III (2013–2019)

=== Congress ===
District	Representative	Party	Term	Bloc
1st	Rhea Mae Gullas	Lakas	2	Majority
2nd	Edsel Galeos	Lakas	2	Majority
3rd	Karen Flores Garcia	NUP	1	Majority
4th	Sun Shimura	PMP	1	Majority
5th	Duke Frasco	1Cebu	3	Majority
6th	Daphne Lagon	Lakas	2	Majority
7th	Patricia Calderon	NPC	1	Majority

== Economy ==
Poverty incidence of Cebu (%)

Source: Philippine Statistics Authority

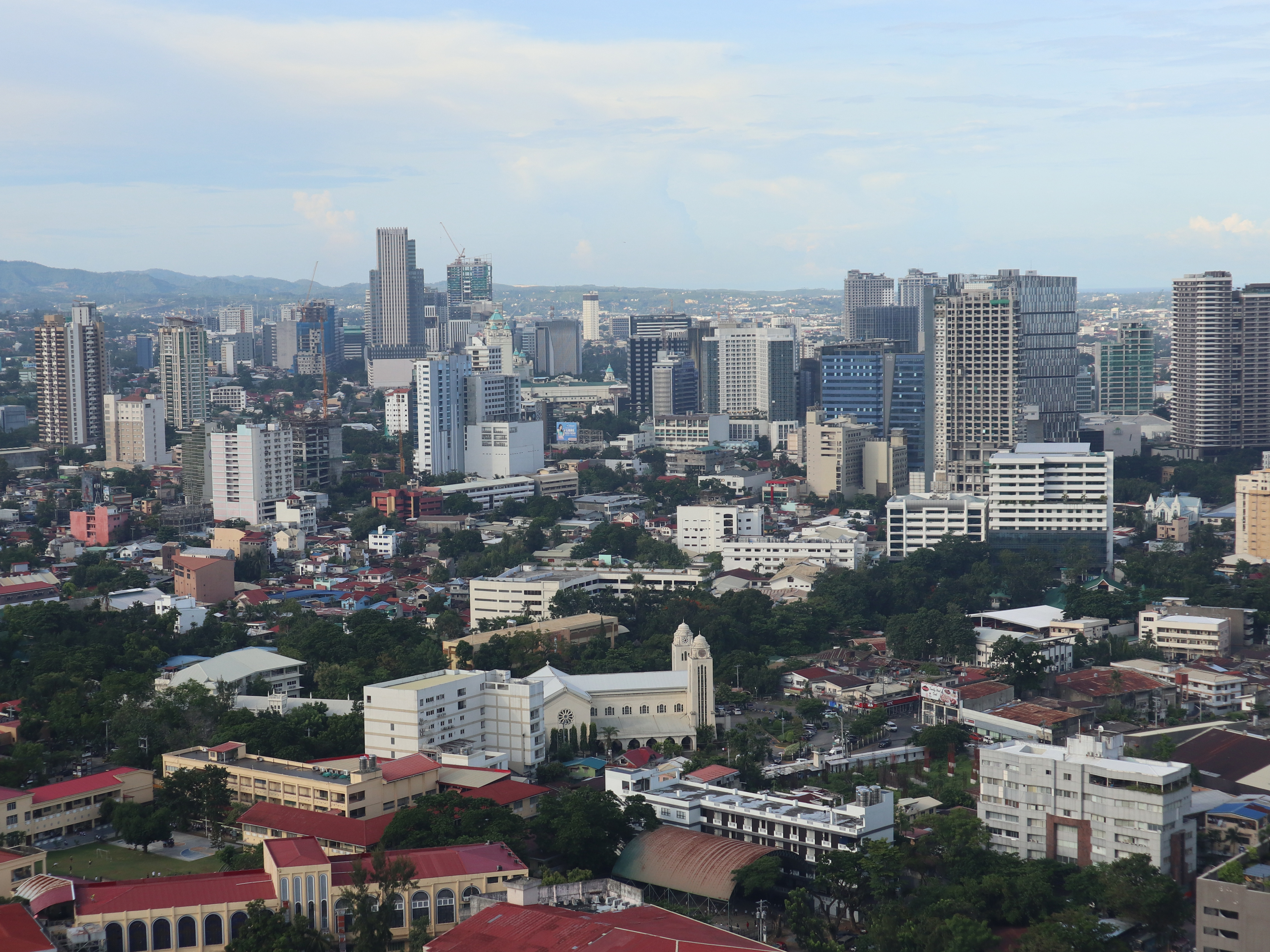
Cebu City, although independent from Cebu Province (together with Mandaue and Lapu-Lapu City), is the largest city and economic hub of the island.

"Ceboom", a combination of Cebu and boom, has been used to describe the province's economic development. With many beautiful islands, white sand beaches, luxury hotels and resorts, diving locations and heritage sites, high domestic and foreign tourist arrivals have fueled the tourism industry of Cebu. Cebu consistently gets a big share of tourist arrivals in the Philippines and has become the tourist gateway to Central and Southern Philippines due to its central geographic location, accessibility, and natural resources. The province also hosts various national and international conferences every year.

About 80% of domestic and international shipping operators and shipbuilders in the Philippines are located in Cebu. Shipbuilding companies in Cebu have manufactured bulk carriers of up to 70,000 tonnes deadweight (DWT), and double-hulled fastcraft as well. Cebu's industry helps make the Philippines the 5th largest shipbuilding country in the world.

Cebu's extensive port facilities and its proximity to intra-Asian shipping and air routes are major factors which led multinational companies to establish offices or factories on the main island, as well as in the island of Mactan, where they are clustered in special economic zones known as the Mactan Economic Processing Zone 1 (MEPZ-1) and the Mactan Economic Processing Zone 2 (MEPZ-2). Due to its burgeoning furniture-making industry, Cebu has been named as the furniture capital of the Philippines. Cebu's other exports include: fashion accessories, guitars, coconut, coconut oil, dried mangoes, carrageenan, gifts, toys, watches, cameras, electronic components, and housewares.

With a revenue growth rate of 18.8 percent in 2012, the real estate industry is the fastest-growing sector in Cebu. With strong economic indicators and high investors' confidence level, more condominium projects and hypermarkets are being developed in the locality. An additional 100 commercial and residential buildings would be completed by 2015 and another 170 to 200 buildings are expected to be finished by 2017. 64 new hypermarkets will be developed in Cebu.

In 2013, Cebu ranked 8th worldwide in the "Top 100 BPO Destinations Report" by global advisory firm, Tholons. The Cebu Chamber of Commerce and Industry, an organization of Cebu's businesses, is promoting the city's growth and economy on information and communications technology, with the aim of making Cebu the premier ICT, software and e-services investment destination in Southeast Asia. Data gathered by the National Economic Development Authority (Neda) 7 showed that of the 98 BPO and IT companies operating in Cebu, 32 offer voice operations while 66 companies offer non-voice operations. Of the 95,000 employed by the industry, more than half or 50,000 are in the non-voice sector. In 2012, the growth in IT-BPO revenues in Cebu grew 26.9 percent at $484 million, while nationally, the industry grew 18.2 percent at $13 billion.

Cebu's economy is also driven by the mining and quarrying areas in Toledo, Naga, Alcoy, and Danao.

Cebu even boasts of being a subsidiary of one of the leading ice rink manufacturers in the world. These rinks are engineered and fabricated in Cebu by Ice Rink Supply and shipped worldwide by Freeze Point Rink Services.

Tourism is an important industry for the province. In 2019, Cebu welcomed 1.4 million foreign tourists, and is one of the most visited in the country by both domestic and foreign visitors. Cebu Island has also entered the list of Condé Nast Traveler's World's Best Islands rankings thrice: 2016, 2017 and 2019. Cebu City and Cebu Province, despite being administratively separated from each other, are often marketed as a single tourist destination, combining natural countryside scenery with urban attractions including cultural-historical sites and developing infrastructure.

== Tourism ==
=== Attractions ===
Cebu City is a significant cultural centre in the Philippines. The imprint of Spanish and Roman Catholic culture is evident. There are also many historically important sights all over the province.

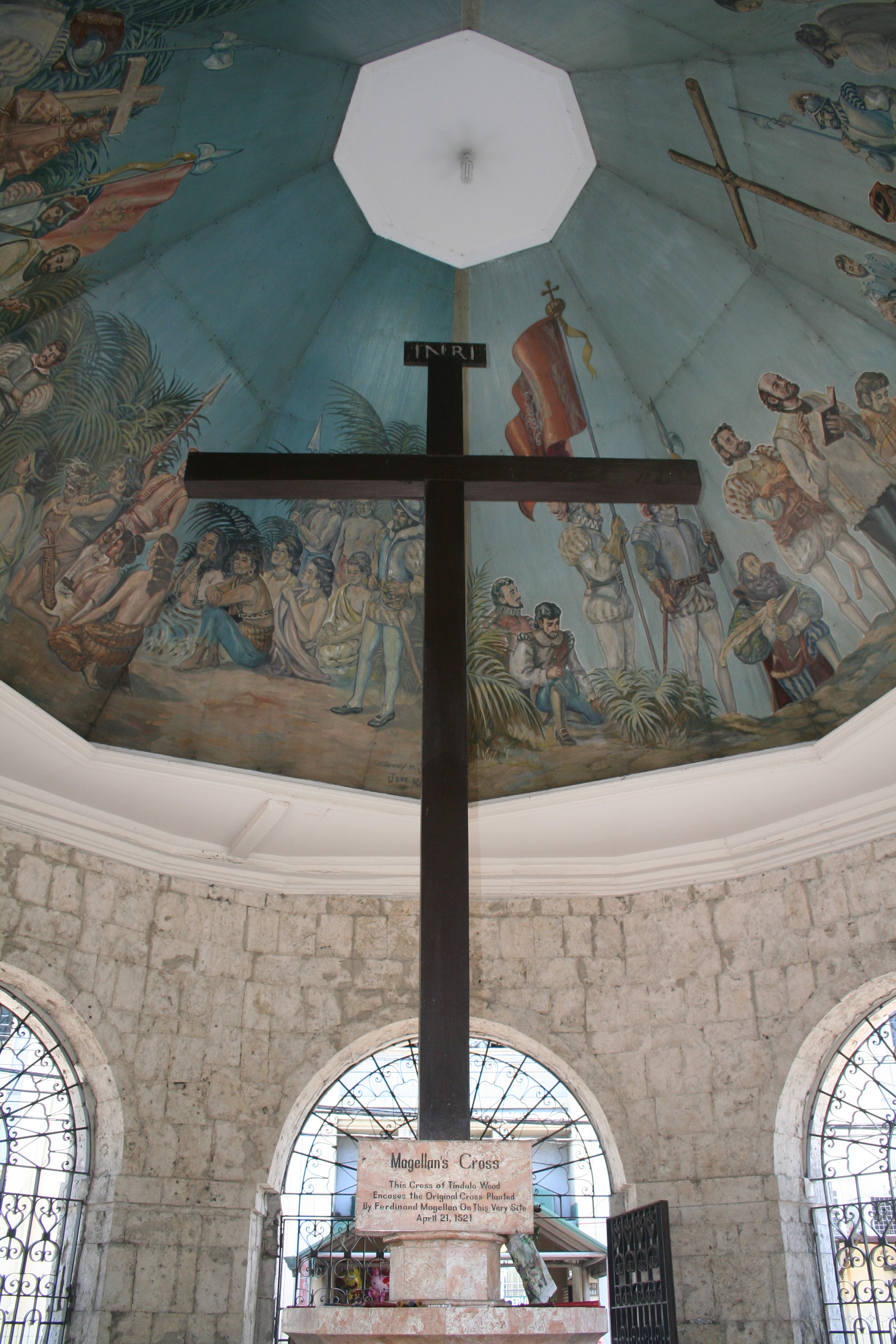
Magellan's Cross, Cebu City

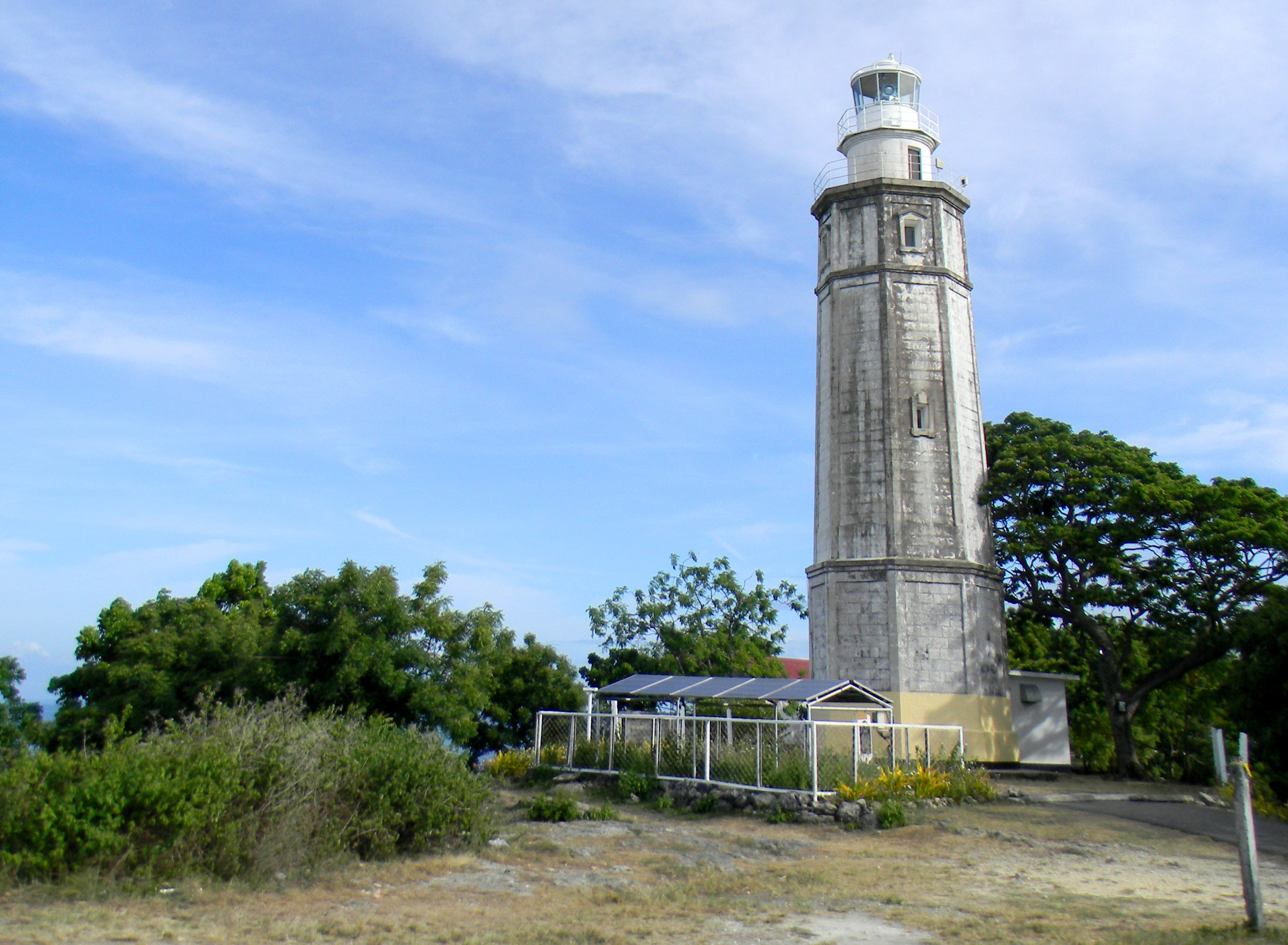
Bagacay Point Lighthouse, Liloan

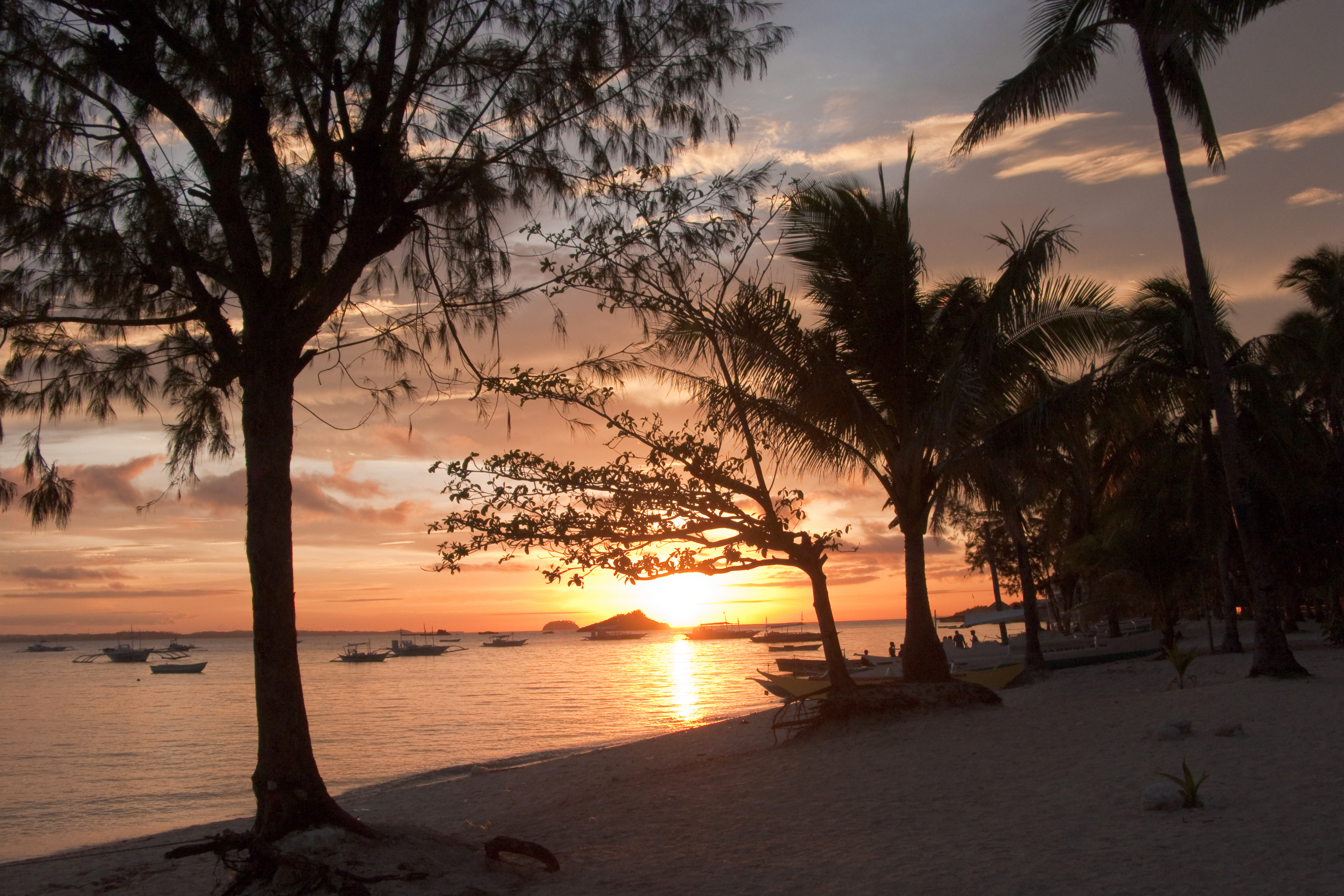
Bounty Beach, Malapascua Island, Daanbantayan

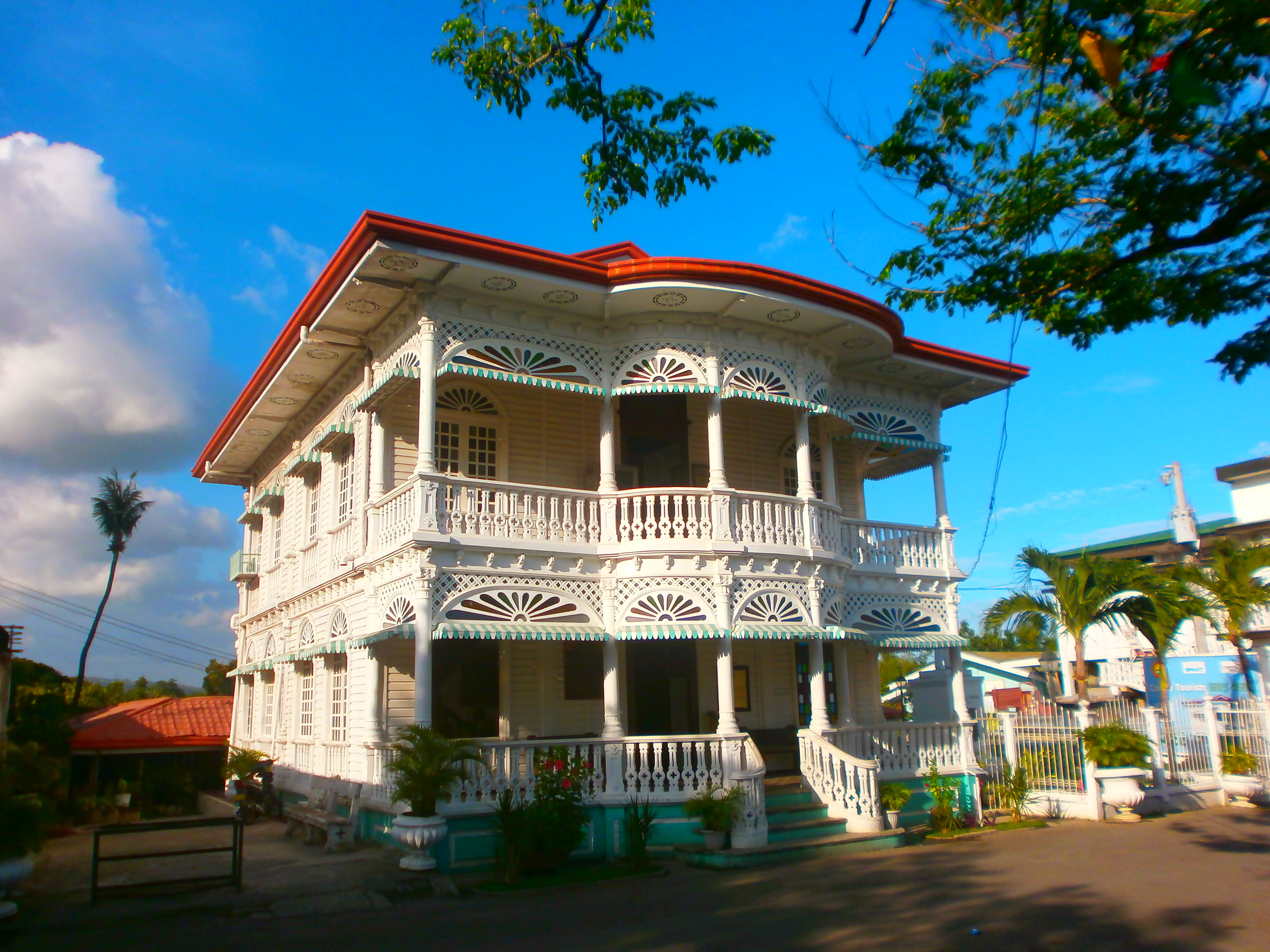
Carcar Museum (formerly Carcar Dispensary), Carcar

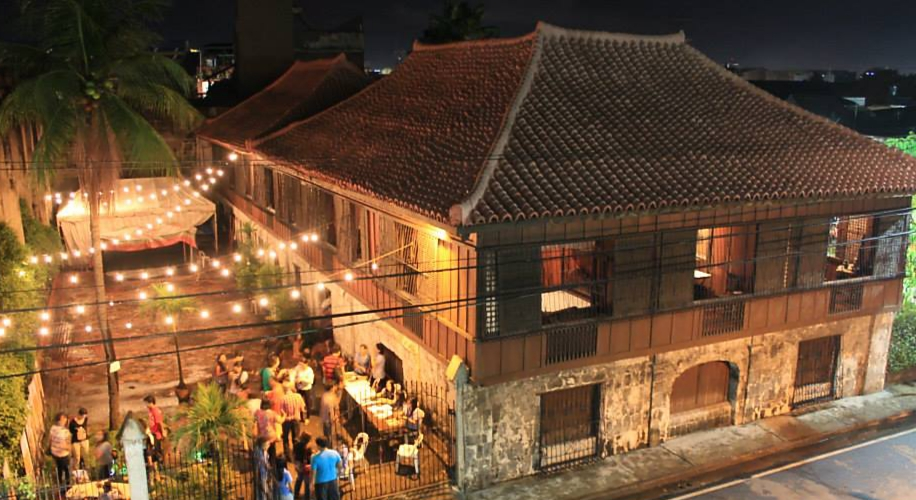
Casa Gorordo Ancestral house Museum

=== Cuisine ===
Cebu also has a great number of delicacies from every town. Much of the delicacies are either precolonial or influenced by Spanish or Chinese cuisines.

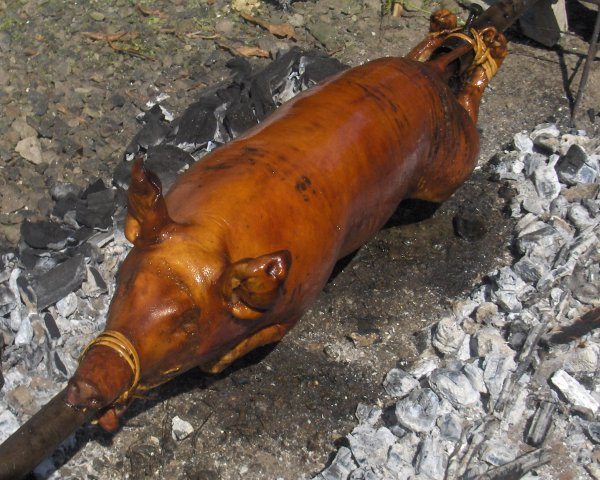
Cebu Lechon is one of the two types of lechon in the Philippines. It is served primarily around the Metro Cebu Area, particularly Talisay City, but is served throughout the island and other parts of the Visayas.

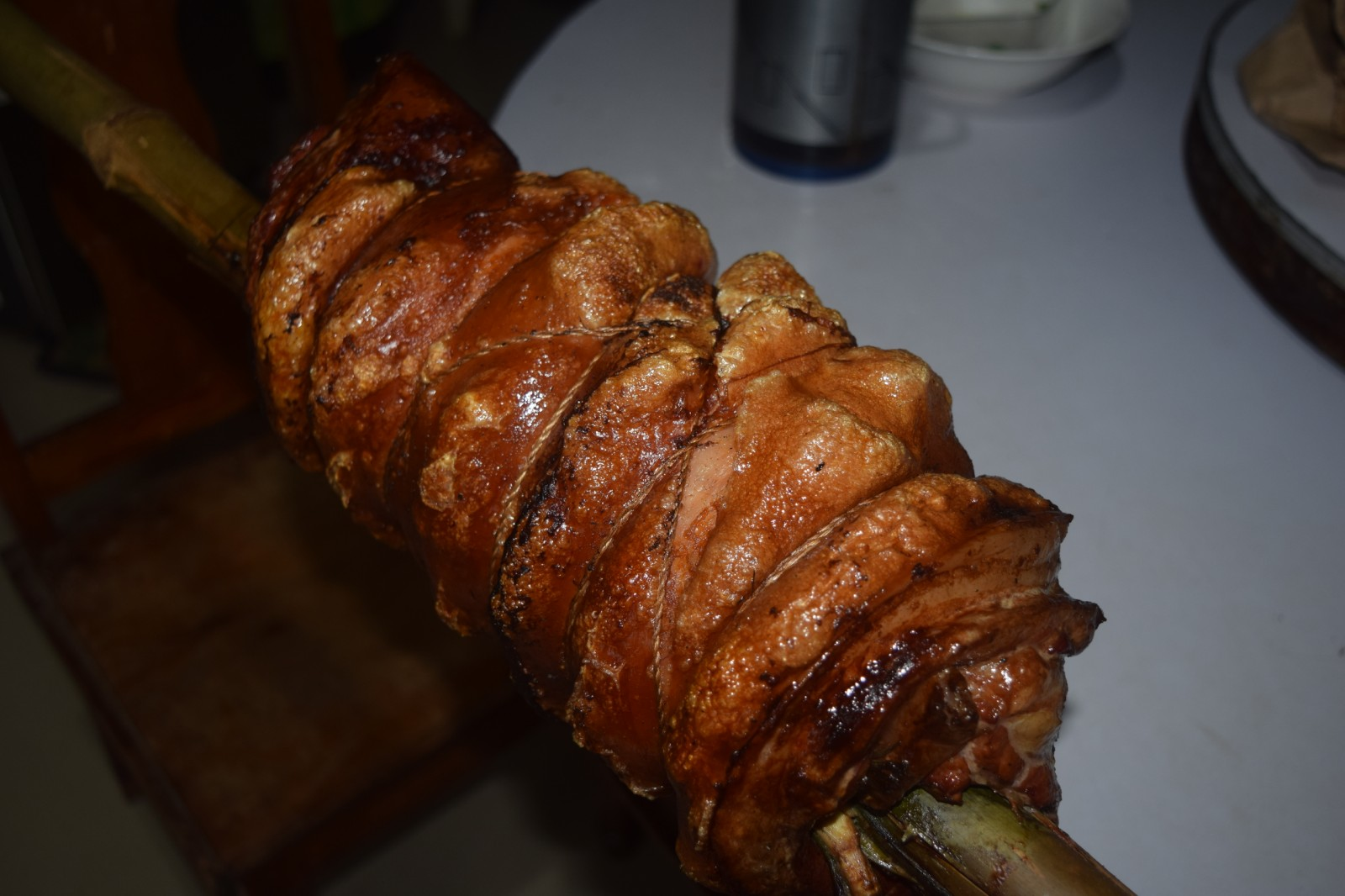
Liempo is a variation of lechon that contains only the pork belly rather than a whole pig. In Cebu, it is served primarily in Balamban.

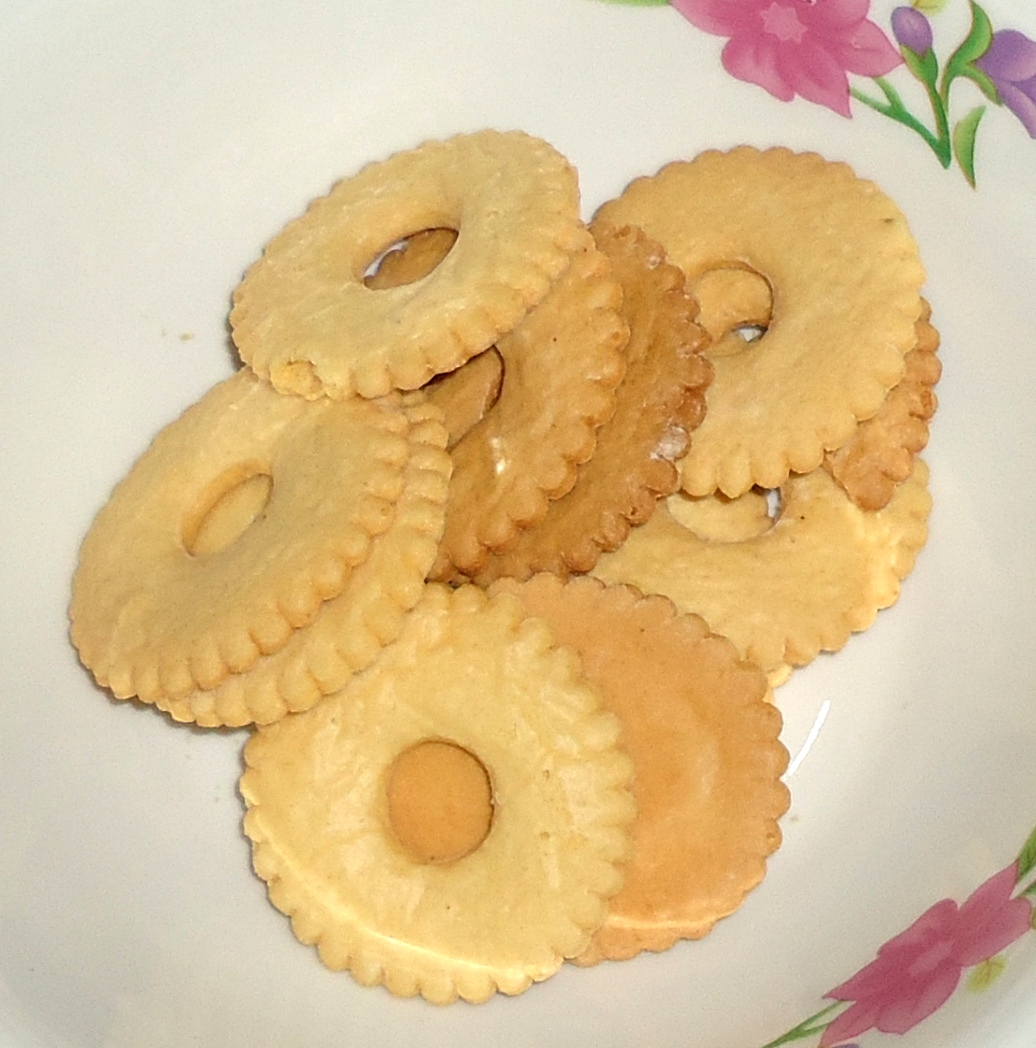
Rosquillos are Philippine cookies that originate from Liloan.

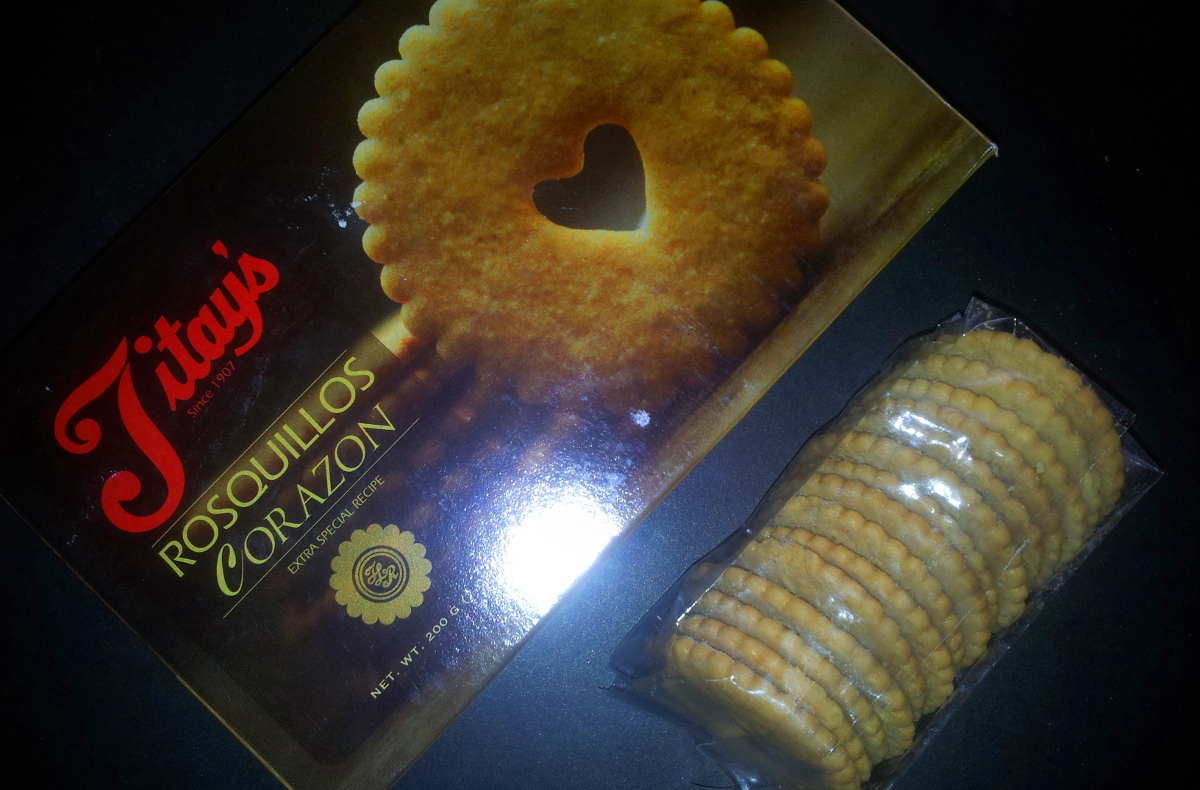
The Corazon Rosquillos, a special variety of Rosquillos from Titay's that has a heart-shaped hole instead of a circular one.

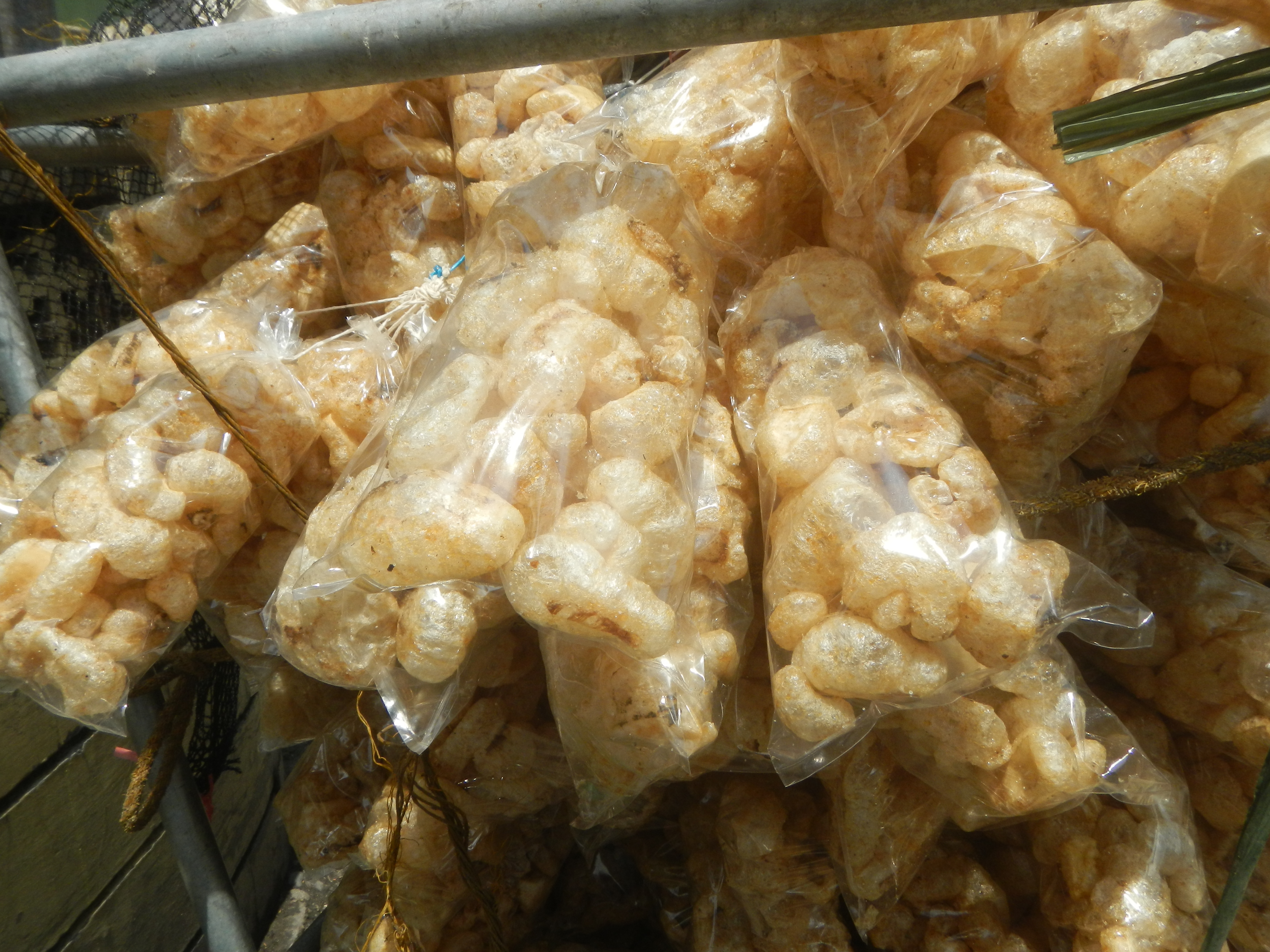
Chicharon is a common Filipino Food that is made up of crispy fried pork rinds. In Cebu, it is commonly found in Carcar.

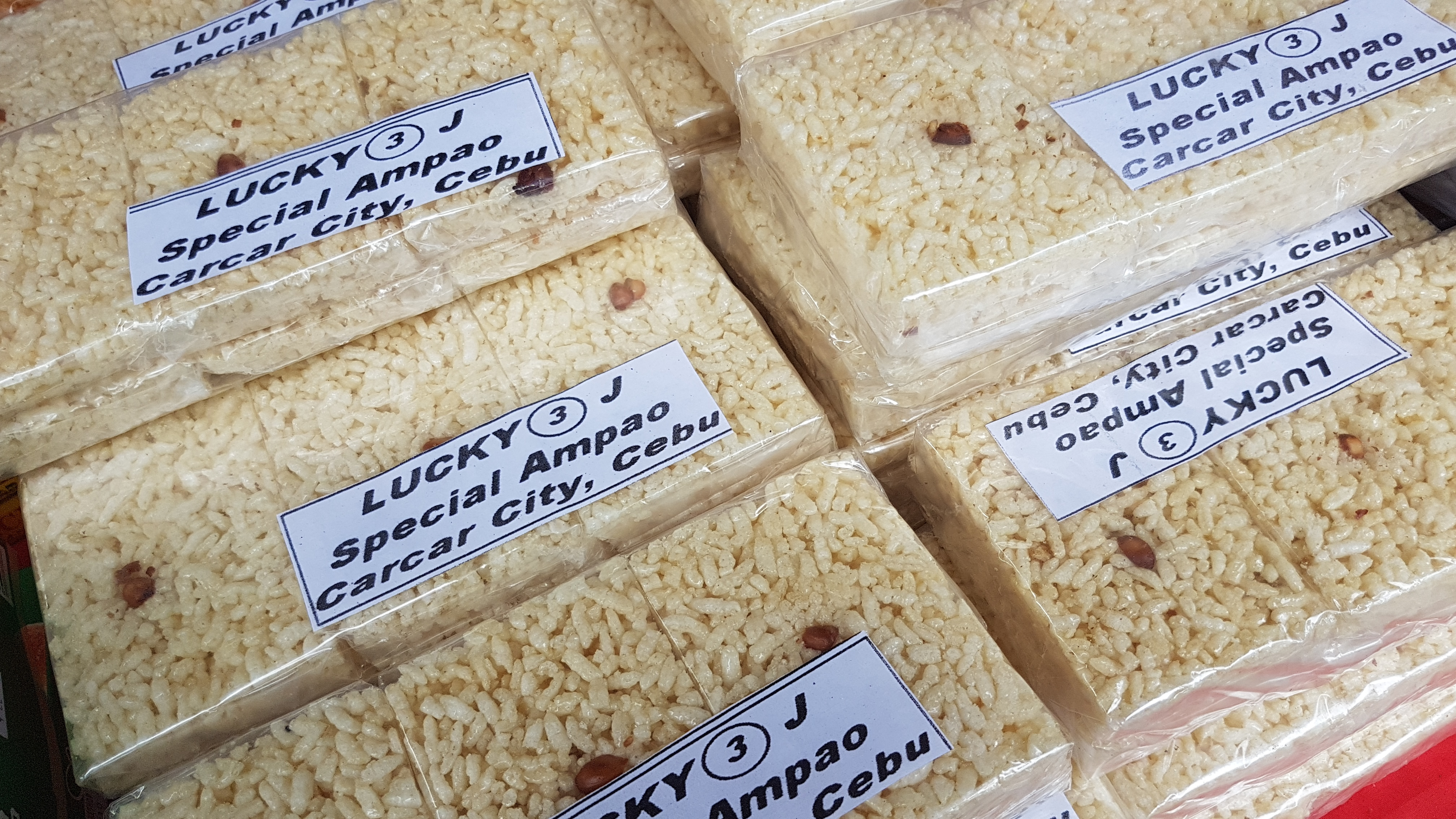
Ampaw is a Cebuano snack made from fried white rice coated in syrup, usually with Peanuts inside. It originates from Carcar.

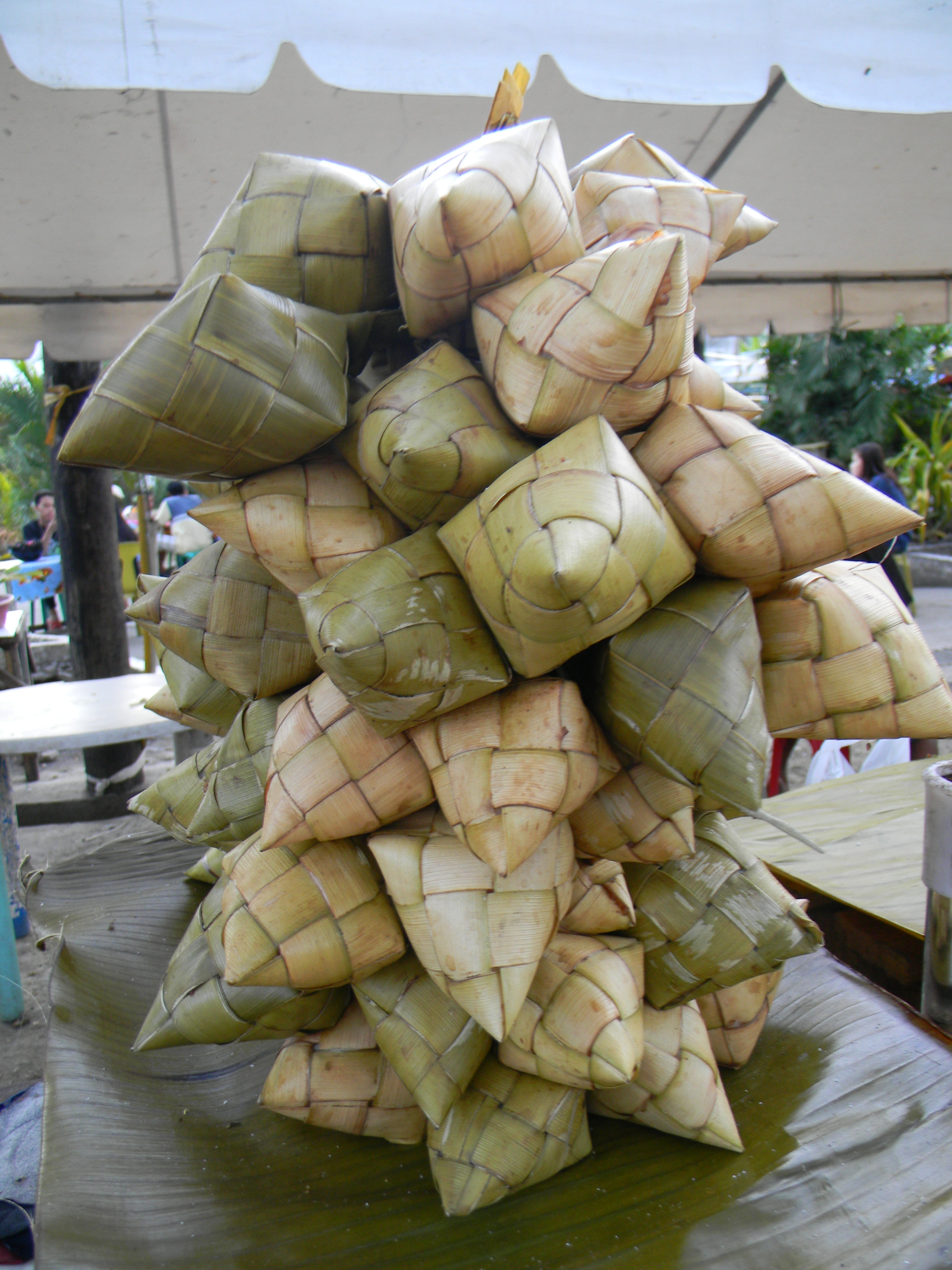
Pusô is rice boiled in a woven pouch made from palm leaves. It is common all throughout the Visayas.

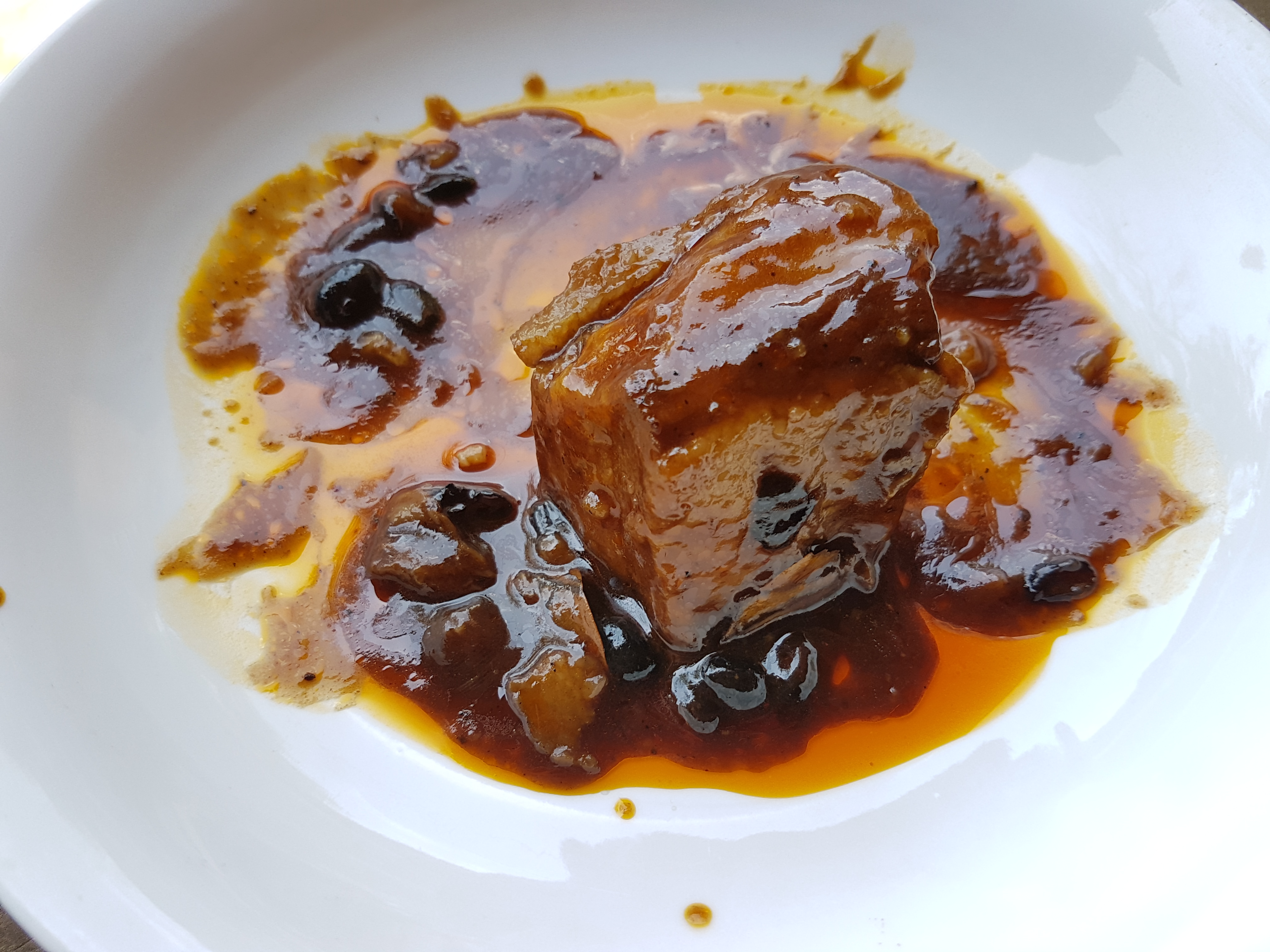
Humbà is a braised pork dish from the Visayas. In Cebu, it is primarily served in Ronda.

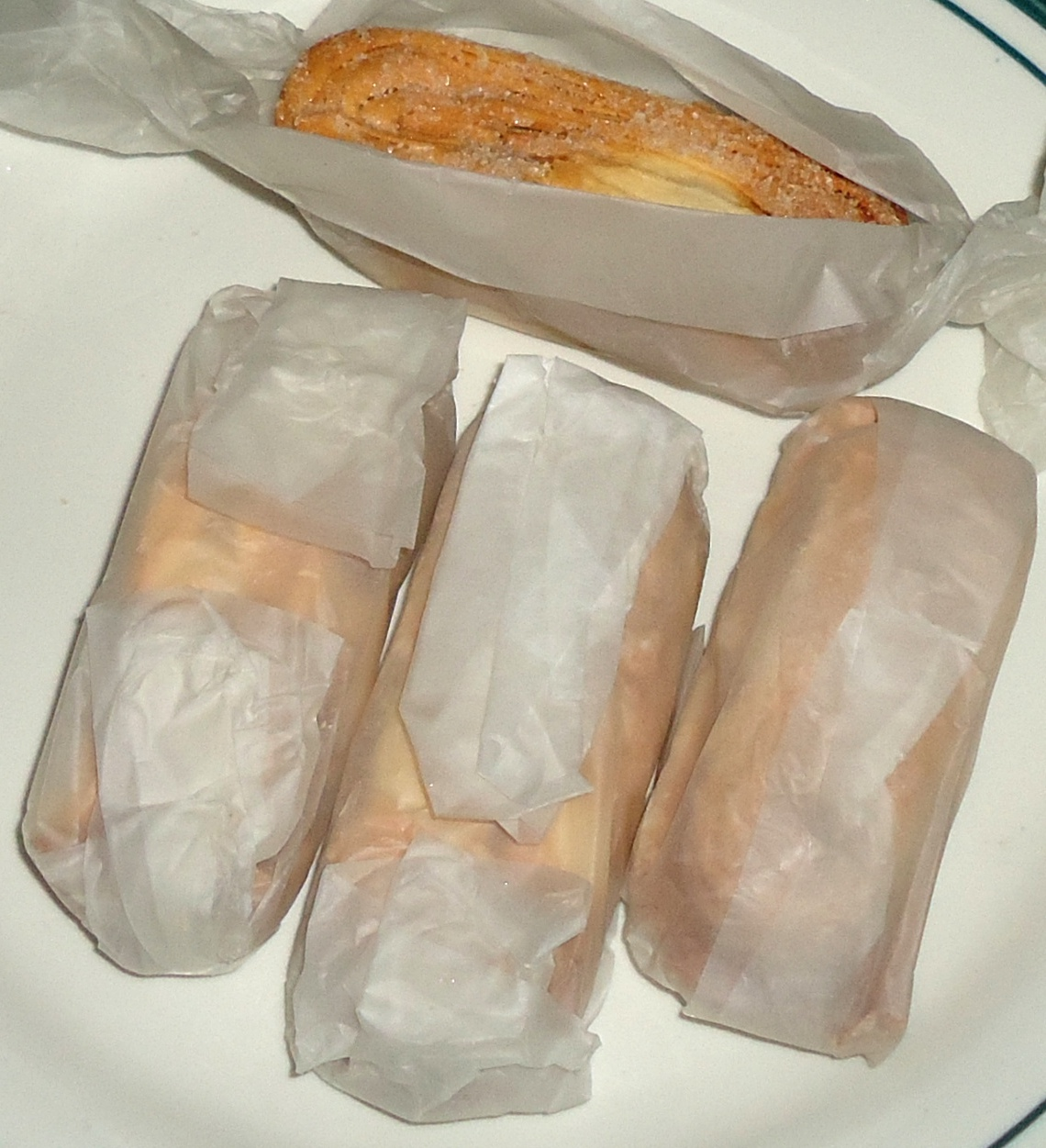
Otap is an oval-shaped puff pastry cookie that originates from Cebu.

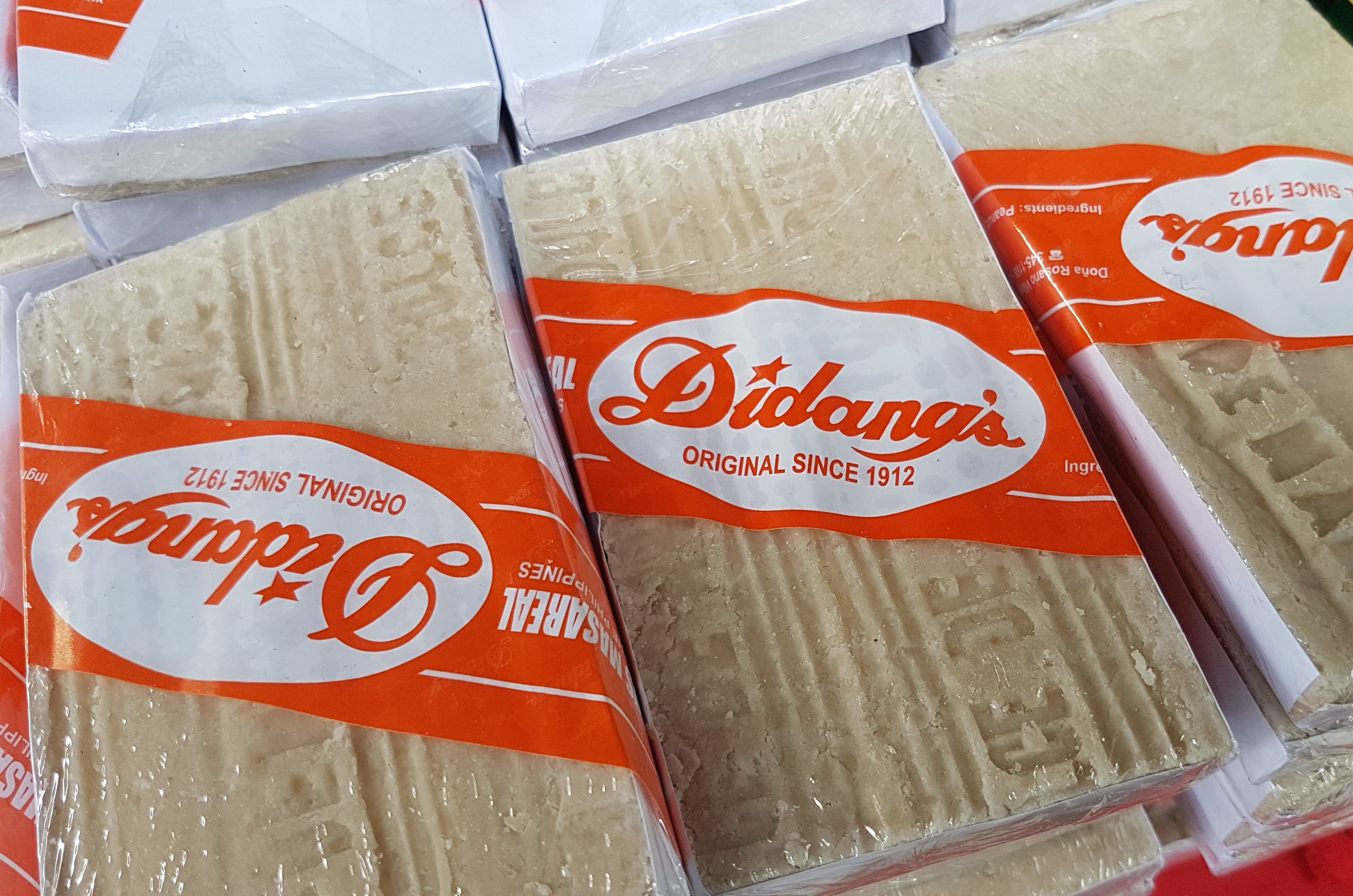
Masareal is a Cebuano delicacy that is made from a mixture of finely-ground boiled peanuts, coconut syrup (latík), and water. It originates from Mandaue.

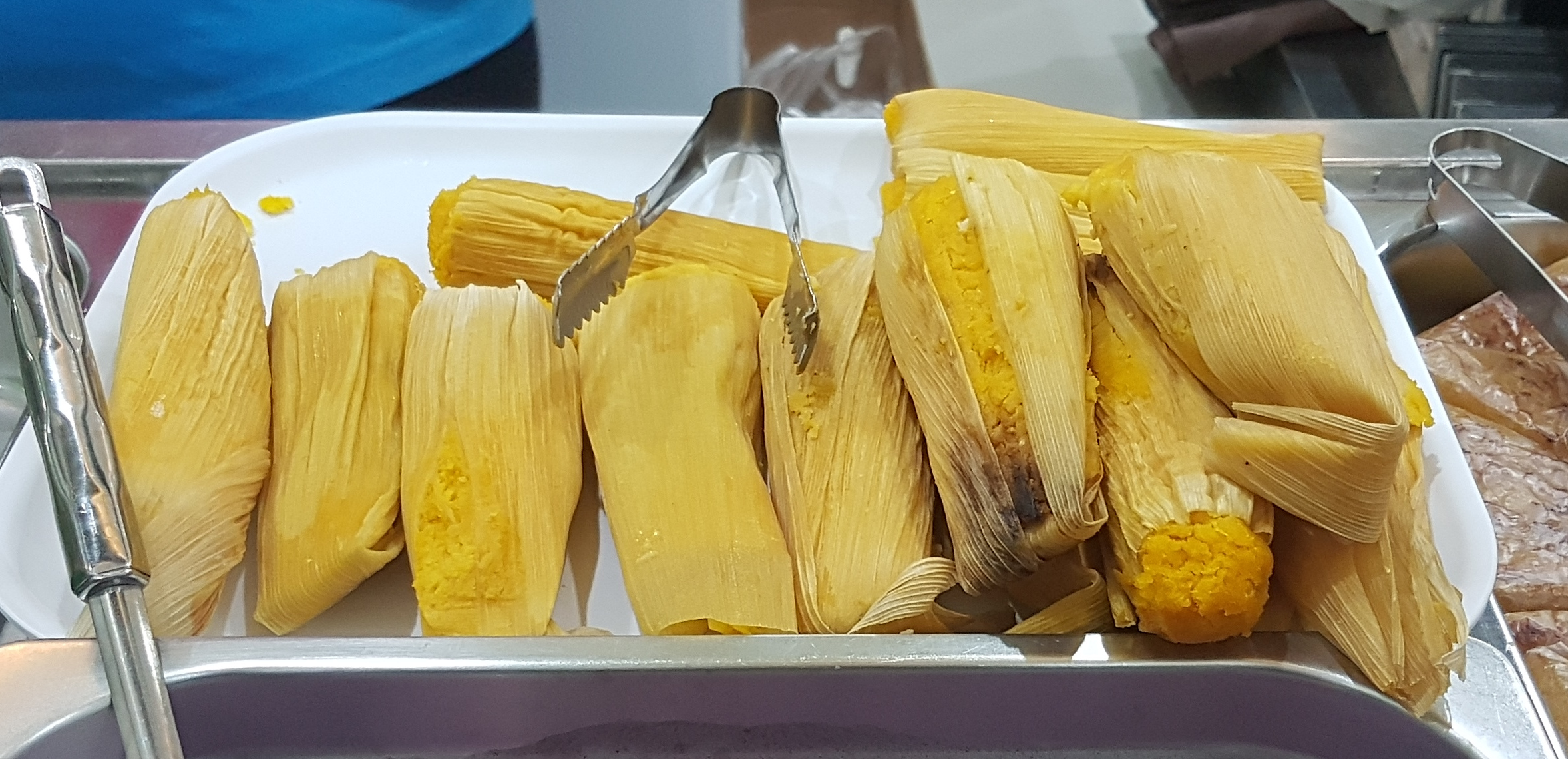
Pintos, also known as Binaki, is a Philippine steamed corn sweet tamales that is served in both Bukidnon and Cebu, particularly in Bogo.

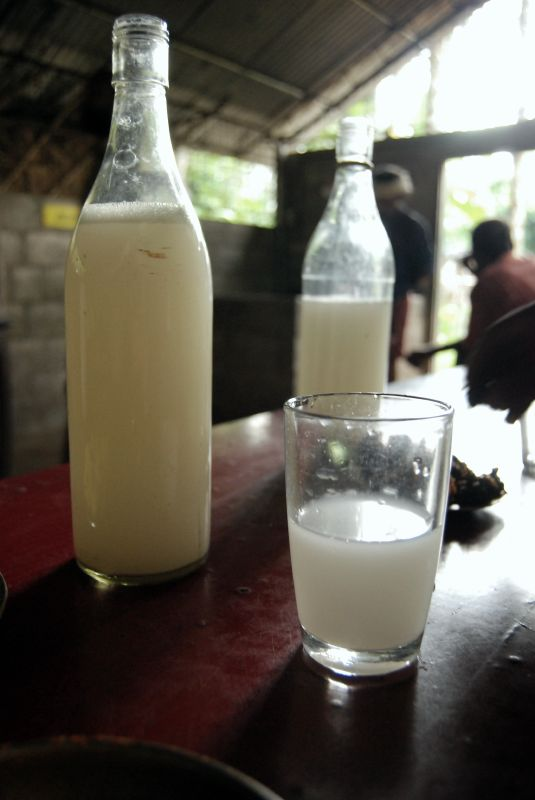
Tubâ, is a type of Philippine Coconut wine or "toddy" found in the Visayas. In Cebu, it is found in both Borbon and Argao.

=== Significant dates ===
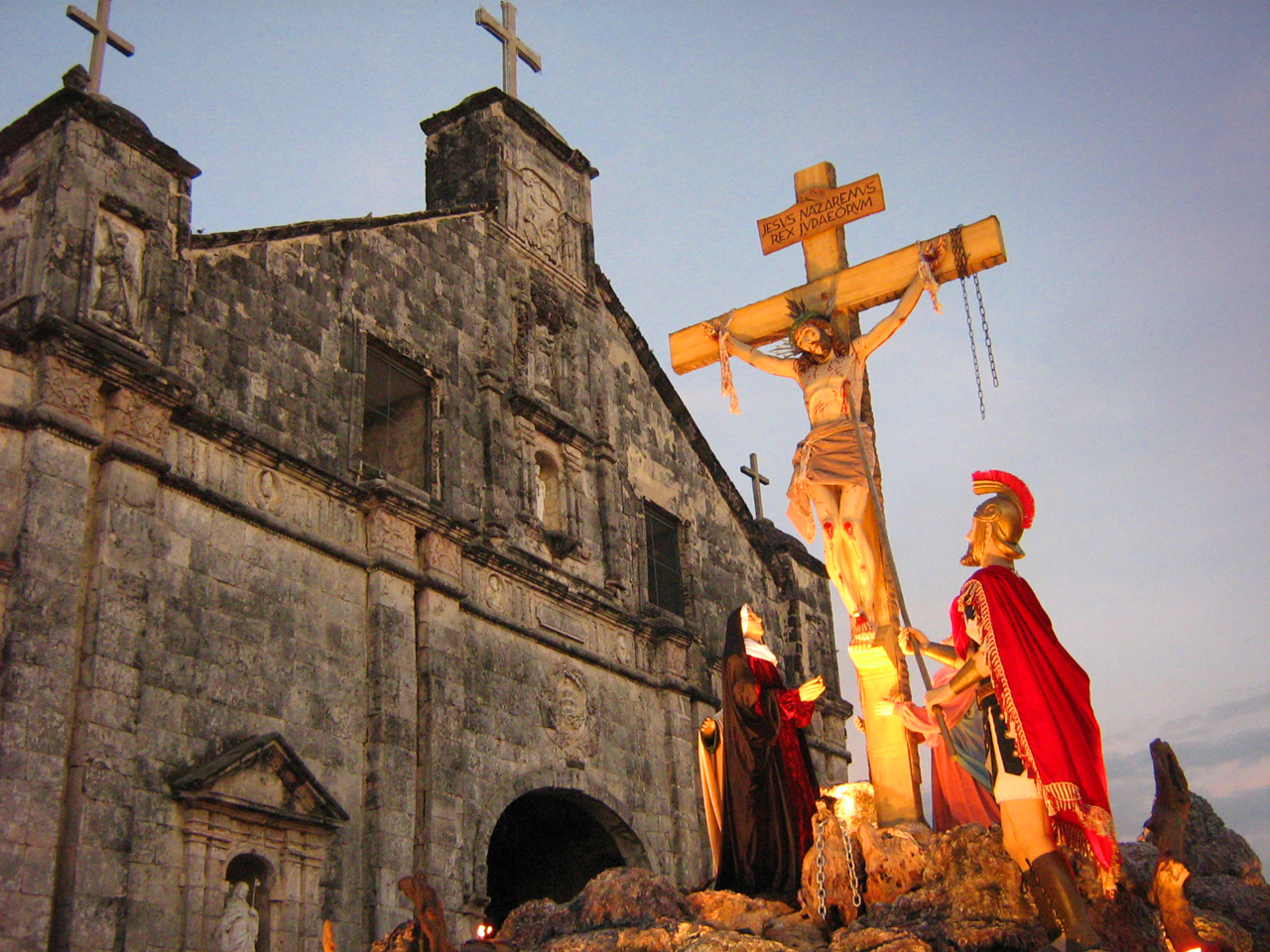
One of the Passus of the Good Friday procession of the Semana Santa of Bantayan showing St. Longinus piercing the side of the Body of Christ. Bantayan's Holy Week processions and practices are said to be the grandest in the Visayas. Bantayan is also the only town in the Philippines where fasting is not strictly observed during Holy Week.

Cebu Provincial Charter Day

The province celebrates its charterhood August 6 each year. It is considered a special non-working holiday throughout the entire province, including the three independent city states.

During the monthly celebration of Cebu's provincial charterhood, the province hosts a variety of events in line with the aim for unity among all Cebuanos. As part of the Founding Anniversary Celebration of the province, the capitol hosts the Tabo sa Kapitolyo, a provincial trade fair that features all the products, delicacies, and other specialties from each city and municipality in the province. The province also hosts the Pasigarbo sa Sugbo Festival of Festivals, a celebration that showcases all festivals from every town of Cebu and is meant to highlight the culture, history, traditions, and way of life of all Cebuanos.

Semana Santa sa Bantayan

The Semana Santa of Bantayan is the local Holy Week celebration in the town of Bantayan. It is largely considered the grandest celebration of Holy Week in the Visayas. The celebration features lifelike Passus depicting the Passion and Death of Jesus on top of intricate caroes that are paraded throughout the entire town.

One thing that makes the Holy Week and Lenten Celebration of Bantayan unique from other Holy Week observations of other parts of Cebu and the Philippines (and, quite possibly, the world) is that traditional Lenten Fast is not strictly observed during Holy Week. This is because the town of Bantayan has received an exemption from the traditional Lenten fast directly from the Vatican. The exemption or special permission dated July 27, 1824, which is formally known as "Bantayan Indult", was signed by Pope Leo XII himself. The Bantayan Indult was given through Padre Doroteo Andrada Del Rosario and allows the consumption of meat on days of fasting and obligation. The original document is being kept at the Bantayan Museum on Bantayan Island.

There are several speculations as to why the town made the request for an indult. The most probable reason for having this indult is because people in the town would usually avoid fishing during Holy Week. This is likely because, at the time, all forms of work were prohibited, including fishing and aquaculture. Without anyone supplying fish, the only allowed meat for fasting, to the town, the Bantayanons were left with no choice but to eat the meat that is normally prohibited in Lent. There is also another reason for this based on folk beliefs. Because of the local belief that evil powers and malignant entities are stronger during Good Friday, the day of the death of Jesus, the fishermen of the town would deem it too unsafe to fish, in fear that an evil presence will come upon them at sea.

In truth, the indult has long expired and is no longer valid, however, Bantayanons today still practice eating the usually forbidden meat during Holy Week as it has already become part of their Lenten traditions.

Gabii sa Kabilin

Translating to "Heritage Night", it is a program initiated by the Ramon Aboitiz Foundation Incorporated in 2007. Gabii sa Kabilin is an event that aims to help preserve Cebu's rich history, culture and heritage, by encouraging the public to visit the different museums and heritage structures of Cebu. For one night, all the museums and heritage structures of Cebu all open their doors for all people in order for them to learn about the history of Cebu, as well as its heritage and cultural legacy. Although most of the heritage locations that participate in the heritage night are from Cebu City, there are also other locations that are from the other parts of the province. Museo Sugbo, the provincial museum, and the National Museum of the Philippines of Cebu are among the participating museums of Gabii sa Kabilin.

=== Festivals ===
The Province of Cebu is known for its many festivals, in particular the Sinulog Festival. Most towns and barangays in Cebu have a festival. It is because of all these festivals that Cebu is known as a "Festival Island".

== Infrastructure ==
Terminal 2 building of Mactan–Cebu International Airport.

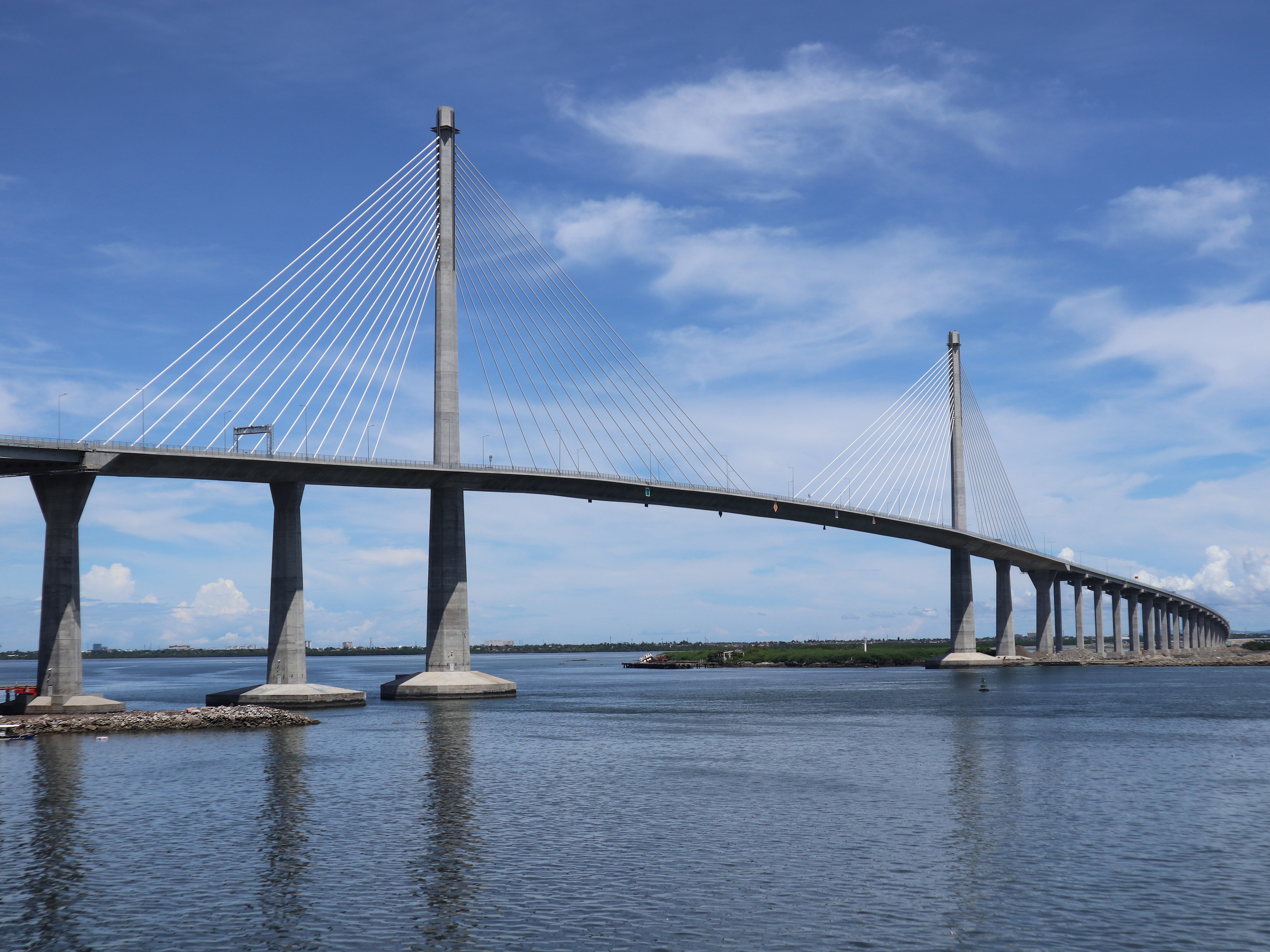
The CCLEX Bridge, completed in 2022, is the longest sea-crossing bridge in the Philippines

Mactan–Cebu International Airport (MCIA) on the island of Mactan serves as the main gateway to domestic and international routes to or from Cebu City and other islands in the Visayas region. In the last 15 years, MCIA's passenger traffic has grown at an annual average of 21% for international passenger traffic. The airport is the second busiest airport in the Philippines in passenger and cargo traffic. The plan for a new terminal expansion of the airport is underway and is estimated to cost $240 million under a public-private partnership program of the Philippine government. The new terminal will host international flights while the old terminal will host domestic flights.

In addition, MCIA Authority (MCIAA) General Manager Nigel Paul Villarete also proposed to establish a Bus Rapid Transit (BRT) line to transport airport passengers to and from MCIAA and different parts of Cebu. This will be integrated into the proposed Bus Rapid Transit (BRT) System being planned in Metro Cebu.

The Port of Cebu is the largest shipping hub in the Visayas region.

Cebu Pacific Air is an airline owned by Cebu-based Gokongwei family. On May 28, 2008, Cebu Pacific was named as the world's number one airline in terms of growth. The airline carried a total of almost 5.5 million passengers in 2007, up 57.4% from 2006. On January 6, 2011, Cebu Pacific flew its 50 millionth passenger (from Manila to Beijing). The airline reached 100 million passengers in 2015. Cebu Pacific commenced international long-haul flights to Middle East and Australia, with flights to Guam starting Q1 2016.

Notable business districts are the Cebu Business Park and the Cebu IT Park. This area hosts industries related to the information technology industry such as software development, telecommunications, engineering research and development centers, and business process outsourcing. In 2013, Ayala Corporation's affiliate, Ayala Land Inc., announced that it is looking at introducing another business park development within the Cebu City area to optimize the high performance of real estate investments in Cebu.

The city's 300-hectare (740-acre; 3.0 km^{2}; 3,000,000 m^{2}) reclamation forms South Road Properties – a mixed-use development south of the city which features entertainment, leisure, residential and business-processing industries. Is the site of SM Seaside City Cebu, the eighth largest mall in the world (and 3rd largest shopping mall in the Philippines), Filinvest's Citta di Mare and Il Corso, and the University of the Philippines – Cebu campus.

In Mactan Island, Megaworld Corporation's Mactan Newtown is a 25-hectare business park near Shangri-La's Mactan Resort and Spa. The project will be home to high-tech offices, a retail center, residential towers and villages, and leisure facilities with beach resort frontage.

Mactan Island is linked to mainland Cebu via Mactan-Mandaue Bridge, Marcelo Fernan Bridge and Cebu–Cordova Link Expressway, the longest bridge in the Philippines.

== Media ==
Cebu is home to a local television station, Cebu Catholic Television Network (CCTN). (Note: a religious station partly owned and endorsed by the Archdiocese of Cebu)

Despite having their own local stations, Cebuanos prefer to watch the Philippines's several dominant television networks, namely: ABS-CBN (now Kapamilya Channel, A2Z and ALLTV), People's Television Network, Radio Philippines Network, IBC, GMA Network and TV5.

While national newspapers have a presence on the island, Cebu has English-language local newspapers – The Freeman (under the Star Group), SunStar Cebu and Cebu Daily News (under the Inquirer Group): and Cebuano-language newspapers – SunStar SuperBalita owned by SunStar, and Banat News owned by The Freeman. Each of the local newspapers sell cheaper than their national counterparts.

== Education ==
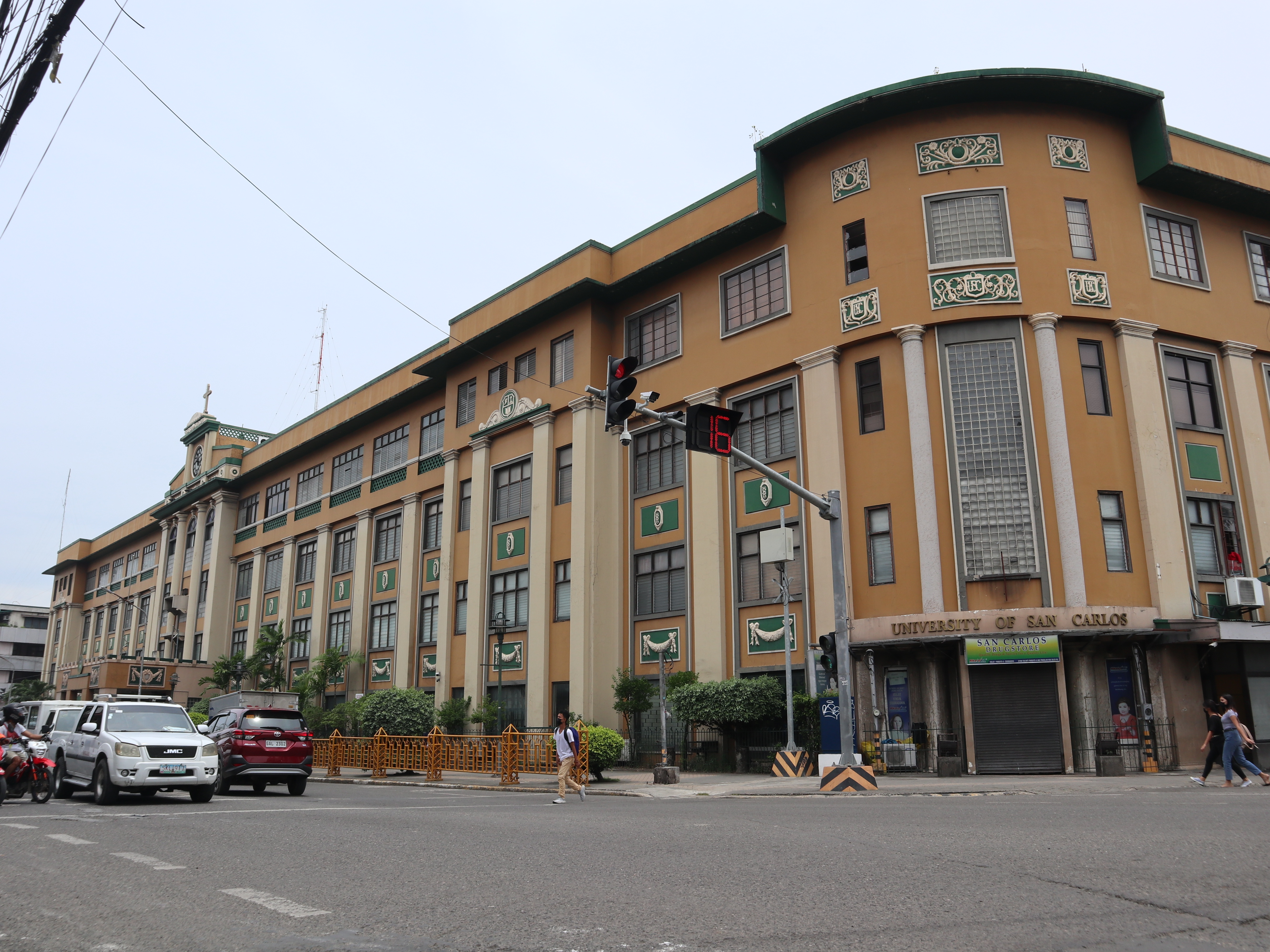
University of San Carlos, one of the oldest universities in the Philippines.

The Philippine elementary school begins in Grades 1 to 6. The high school program takes six years, from Grades 7 through to 12, taken after graduating from elementary school. Cebu is considered as the main education hub in the Visayas. It has eleven large universities each with a number of college branches mostly throughout the capital, Cebu City, and more than a dozen other schools and universities specializing in various courses such as Medicine, Engineering, Nautical courses, Nursing, Law, Commerce, Education, Computer and IT and other professions.

The most prominent of these universities are (in alphabetical order):

- Cebu Doctors University
- Cebu Institute of Technology–University
- Cebu Normal University
- Cebu Technological University
- Southwestern University
- University of Cebu
- University of San Carlos
- University of San Jose–Recoletos
- University of Southern Philippines Foundation
- University of the Philippines Cebu
- University of the Visayas
- UV Gullas College of Medicine

Other notable institutions include: Asian College of Technology in Cebu City and Talisay, Benedicto College, Cebu Eastern College, Cebu Institute of Medicine, a medical school in affiliation with Velez College, The International Academy of Film and Television, established in Mactan in 2004 and Cebu's first film school, Matias H. Aznar Memorial College of Medicine, Salazar Colleges of Science and Institute of Technology, among others.

Cebu is home to one fully accredited international school, Cebu International School, a K–12 school established in 1924. Cebu is considered to be a hub of medical education, with many international students coming to study medicine in Cebu's medical schools. Some of Cebu's well-known medical schools are in Cebu Doctors University and Cebu Institute of Medicine.

== International relations, events and sisterhood agreements ==
- Cebu hosted two major Information and Communications Technology (ICT) and telecom events, the 12th ASEAN Telecommunications and IT Ministers Meeting (TELMIN) and the 13th ASEAN Telecommunications and IT Senior Officials Meeting (TELSOM) on 2012.
- Cebu hosted the international 4th Dance Xchange, a project organized by the National Dance Committee of the National Commission for Culture and the Arts on 2012.
- Cebu as a founding member hosted the 11th East Asia Inter-Regional Tourism Forum on 2011
- Cebu joined as a participating member of Inter–Island Tourism Policy Forum on 2011 (ITOP Forum)
- Cebu hosted the 12th ASEAN Summit on 2007.
- Cebu hosted Second East Asia Summit on 2007.
- Cebu hosted the inaugural UN Tourism Regional Forum on Gastronomy Tourism for Asia and the Pacific on 2024.
- Cebu hosted the 48th ASEAN Summit and Related Meetings on 2026, under the national chairship theme "Navigating Our Future, Together."
- Cebu hosted 45th ASEAN Tourism Forum 2026 on January 26 - 28, 2026.

=== International Sisterhood Agreements ===
- Sichuan, China (2006)
- Vladimir, Russia (2008)
- Ljubljana, Slovenia (2008)
- Gangwon, South Korea (2008)
- Guam, United States of America (2008)
- Rishon LeZion, Israel (2009)
- Saint Petersburg, Russia (2009)
- Guangdong, China (2009)
- Guangxi, China (2010)
- Barcelona, Spain (2010)
- Autonomous Republic of Crimea, Ukraine (2010)
- Busan, South Korea (2011)
- Ninawa, Iraq (2011)
- Valparaíso, Chile (2011)
- Fujian, People's Republic of China (2018)

=== Existing sisterhood agreements ===
- Hainan, China (1996)
- Hawaii, United States of America (1996)

=== Domestic sisterhood agreements ===
- Sorsogon City, Sorsogon
- (Antique (province)) Antique
- Aklan
- Ilocos Norte
- Iloilo
- Negros Occidental
- Bohol
- South Cotabato
- Bukidnon
- Masbate
- (Laguna (province)) Laguna
- Tagaytay City, Cavite
- Quezon
- (Parañaque City) Parañaque
- Pangasinan
- Davao del Sur
- Zamboanga Sibugay

== See also ==
- List of people from Cebu

== Bibliography ==
- Abellana, Jovito (1952). Aginid, Bayok sa Atong Tawarik (in Cebuano).
- Abella y Casariego, Enrique (1886). Rápida descripcion física, geológica y minera de la Isla de Cebú (in Spanish). Madrid: Tello.
- Bautista, Julius (2006). "The Rebellion and the Icon: Holy Revolutions in the Philippines". Asian Journal of Social Science. 34 (2): 291–310. doi:10.1163/156853106777371166.
- Blair, Emma Helen & Robertson, James Alexander, eds. (1903). The Philippine Islands, 1493–1803. Vol. 2 of 55 (1521–1569). Historical introduction and additional notes by Edward Gaylord Bourne. Cleveland, Ohio: Arthur H. Clark Company. "Explorations by early navigators, descriptions of the islands and their peoples, their history and records of the catholic missions, as related in contemporaneous books and manuscripts, showing the political, economic, commercial and religious conditions of those islands from their earliest relations with European nations to the beginning of the nineteenth century."
- "Revamp, BRT setup eyed for Mactan airport". Cebu Daily News. 2011.
- "Cebu". Encyclopædia Britannica. 2016.
- "Part 2: The first Spanish expedition of 1521". Philippine History. 2009a. Archived from the original on January 31, 2009.
- "Part 3: The Spanish colonization". Philippine History. 2009b. Archived from the original on January 31, 2009.
- Mosqueda, Mars W. (October 4, 2011). "Cebu joins elite ITOP Forum". Manila Bulletin. Archived from the original on October 23, 2011.
- Jonas Reyes (January 13, 2015). "PH ranks 5th among world's shipbuilders". Manila Bulletin. Archived from the original on October 15, 2015.
- Segura, Manuel F. (1992). The Koga papers: stories of WW II. Cebu City: MF Segura Publications.
- Smith, Warren Du Pré (1907). Freer, Paul C.; Strong, Richard D.; Merrill, E. D. (eds.). "The geology of the Compostela-Danao coal field". Philippine Journal of Science. 2A (6): 377 ff.
- "Seechewal inaugurates Punjabi school in Philippines". Tribune of India. Jalandhar. December 3, 2014. Archived from the original on December 8, 2014.
- Dahl, Arthur Lyon (1998). "Islands of Philippines: Cebu". Island Directory. United Nations Environment Programme.
- de Viana, Augusto V. (2005). "The capture of the Koga Papers and its effect on the plan to retake the Philippines in 1944" (PDF). Micronesian: Journal of the Humanities and Social Sciences. 4 (2). National Historical Institute in the Philippines.
- Wernstedt, Frederick L. (1957). The role and importance of Philippine interisland shipping and trade. Southeast Asia Program, Dept. of Far Eastern Studies, Cornell University. ISBN 9780598547866.
