= List of vice governors of Cebu =

Vice Governor of Cebu
- Seal of the Cebu Provincial Government

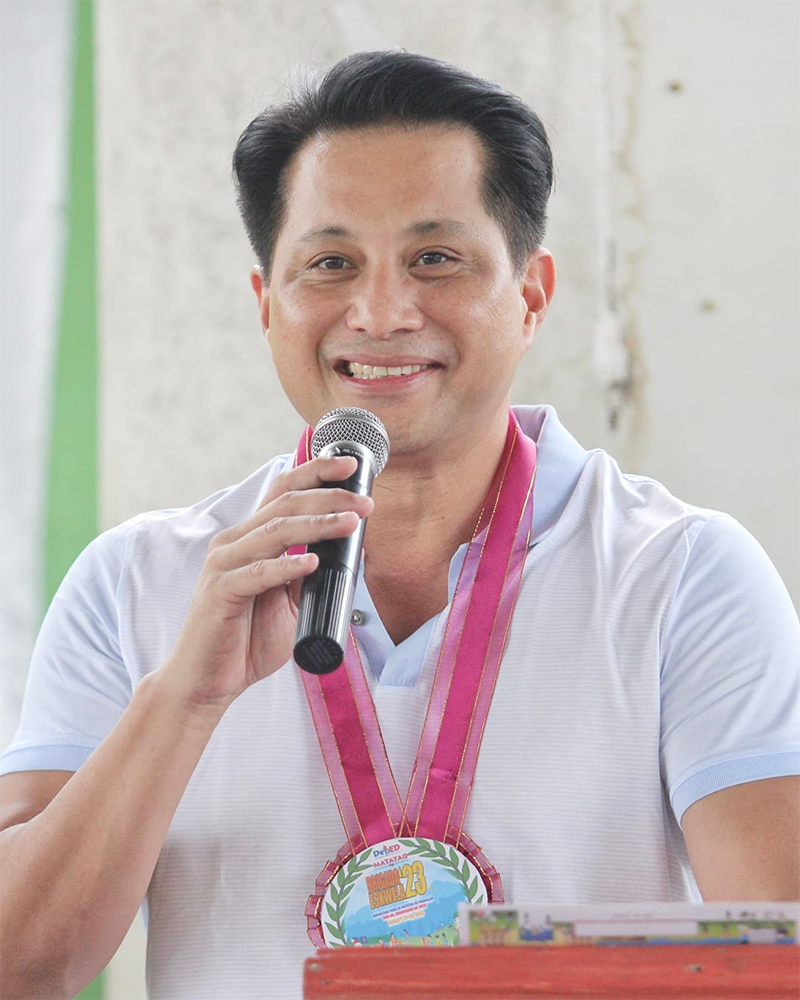
- Incumbent; Glenn Soco since June 30, 2025
- Seat: Cebu Provincial Capitol
- Nominator: Political party
- Appointer: Elected via popular vote
- Term length: 3 years Up to three terms
- Inaugural holder: Julio A. Llorente
- Formation: June 18, 1898

The Vice Governor of Cebu (Filipino: Pangalawang Punong Lalawigan ng Cebu) is the presiding officer of the Sangguniang Panlalawigan, the legislature of the provincial government of Cebu, Philippines.

The current vice governor is Glenn Soco of One Cebu.

== History ==
On June 18, 1898, then President Emilio Aguinaldo promulgated a decree delegating Julio A. Llorente and Segundo Singson as Vice Governor of the Cebu province.

From an appointive position, the office of the Vice Governor become an elective post. The first election to vote for the Vice Governor was conducted in 1959 where Francisco Remotigue won, becoming the first elected Cebu Vice Governor.

In May 2011, Agnes Magpale, niece of former Vice Governor Priscillano D. Almendras, became the first female Vice Governor after succeeding to the office upon the death of incumbent Gregorio Sanchez Jr. She was elected to two full terms in her own right in 2013 and 2016. Hilario Davide III won as Vice Governor in 2019 and 2022, although his running mates Magpale and Ace Durano both lost to Garcia.

In 2025 Cebu local elections, Board Member Glenn Soco of 1Cebu defeated independent candidate and former Department of the Interior and Local Government (DILG) Undersecretary Joselito Ruiz. However, Soco's running mate Garcia lost to neophyte Pam Baricuatro of PDP.

== List of Vice Governors of Cebu ==
The following is the list of past and incumbent Vice Governors of the Province of Cebu:

List of Vice Governors of Cebu
No. (Note: Numbers are counted based on the amount of individuals who have served as Mayor, rather than the amount of terms or administrations. Officials temporarily serving as Acting Mayor due to the absence (e.g. suspension) of the elected mayor, who revert to their original offices afterwards, are not counted.)	Image	Vice Governor Lifespan	Party (Note: A two-party system between the Nacionalistas and Liberals was in place from the postwar period (1946) up until the Marcos dictatorship, which was dominated by Marcos's Kilusang Bagong Lipunan (KBL). After his overthrow in the 1986 EDSA Revolution, a multi-party system emerged which remains in place until the present; local politics revolves around local alliances, which commonly change national political parties with every new Presidential administration.)	Term	Place of Origin	Governor
1		Julio Aballe Llorente; 1863—1955, aged 91-92	Independent	1899	Argao	Luis Flores (1899, Municipal Council President)
2		Segundo Suico Singson; 1845—1911, aged 65-66	Independent	1899 – 1900	Cebu City	Julio Aballe Llorente; 1899—1901
Office vacant: 1900–1960
3		Francisco Emilio Famor Remotigue; 1908—1995, aged 86	Nacionalista	1960 – 1961	Argao	Jose Lorenzo Briones (Liberal); 1955—1961
Office vacant: 1961–1963
4		Priscillano Durano Almendaras		1963 – 1967	Danao City	Jesus Marino "Rene"; Gandiongco Espina (Liberal); 1963—1969
5		Osmundo Genson Rama; 1914—1998, aged 84	Nacionalista	1968 – 1969	Cebu City	Jesus Marino "Rene"; Gandiongco Espina (Liberal); 1963—1969
6		Pablo Paras Garcia; 1925—2021, aged 95		1970 – 1971	Dumanjug	Osmundo Genson Rama (Liberal); 1969—1976
7		Salutario Jakosalem Fernandez; 1927-1990, aged 63		1972 – 1975	Cebu City	Osmundo Genson Rama (Liberal); 1969—1976
Office vacant: 1975–1980
8		Ramon Duterte Durano III b. 1948	KBL	1980 – 1984	Danao City	Eduardo Rivera Gullas Sr. (KBL); 1976—1986
9		Beatriz Durano Calderon	KBL	1985 – 1986 (Note: Following the 1986 EDSA Revolution, President Corazon Aquino forced the resignation of all local government heads and appointed Officers in Charge (OICs) in their place to serve until the 1988 elections.)	Danao City	Eduardo Rivera Gullas Sr. (KBL); 1976—1986
10		Democrito Canaya Barcenas^{1} b. 1934-1935		1986 – 1987	Carcar City	Osmundo Genson Rama^{1} (Liberal); 1986—1988
11		Enrique Ponce Rama		1988 – June 30, 1992	Cebu City	Emilio Mario "Lito" Renner Osmeña (Lakas-NUCD); 1998—1992
12		Apolonio Andrade Abines Jr. 1920—2004, aged 83		June 30, 1992 – June 30, 1998	Oslob	Emilio Mario "Lito" Renner Osmeña (Lakas-NUCD); 1998—1992
12		Apolonio Andrade Abines Jr. 1920—2004, aged 83		June 30, 1992 – June 30, 1998	Oslob	Pablo Paras Garcia (LDP → PROMDI); 1995—2004
13		Fernando S. Celeste b. 1939		June 30, 1998 – June 30, 2001	Talisay City or Badian	Pablo Paras Garcia (LDP → PROMDI); 1995—2004
14		John Gregory Henry Osmeña Jr. b. 1971-1972		June 30, 2001 – June 30, 2004	Cebu City	Pablo Paras Garcia (LDP → PROMDI); 1995—2004
15		Gregorio Gallarde Sanchez Jr.^{†} 1943/1944 — 2011, aged 68	Liberal; Local: 1Cebu	June 30, 2004 – May 10, 2011	Tuburan	Gwendolyn Fiel Garcia (LAKAS / 1Cebu); 2004—2013
16		Agnes Almendras Magpale b. 1942	Liberal; Local: BAKUD	May 10, 2011 – June 30, 2019	Danao City	Gwendolyn Fiel Garcia (LAKAS / 1Cebu); 2004—2013
16		Agnes Almendras Magpale b. 1942	Liberal; Local: BAKUD	May 10, 2011 – June 30, 2019	Danao City	Hilario Perez Davide III (Liberal); 2013—2019
17		Hilario Perez Davide III b. 1964	Liberal; Local: BAKUD	June 30, 2019 – June 30, 2025	Cebu City	Gwendolyn Fiel Garcia (PDP-Laban / 1Cebu); 2019—2025
18		Glenn Anthony Ocampo Soco b. 1973	1Cebu	June 30, 2025 – Incumbent	Mandaue City	Pamela Silagan Baricuatro (PDP); 2025—present

Notes

Designations

^{1} Appointed OIC
^{†} Died in office

Vice Governors of Cebu by Hometown
Hometown	Total	Vice Governors
Cebu City (Capital)	6	Singson, O. Rama, Fernandez, E. Rama, Osmeña, Davide
Argao	2	Llorente, Remotigue
Carcar City	1	Barcenas
Danao City	4	Almendras, Durano, Calderon, Magpale
Dumanjug	1	Garcia
Mandaue City	1	Soco
Oslob	1	Abines
Talisay City	1	Celeste
Tuburan	1	Sanchez

== See also ==
- List of governors of Cebu
- Cebu Provincial Board
