= List of University of San Carlos alumni =

This is a list of alumni notable in their own right of the University of San Carlos in Cebu City, Philippines.

== Notable USC alumni ==
- Sergio Osmeña Sr. – (Elem & H.S., valedictorian 1892 and AB, highest distinction 1896 Colegio Seminario de San Carlos) fourth president and first vice president of the Philippines, second senate president pro tempore, former senator, first Speaker of the House of Representatives, Secretary of Public Instruction, Health and Public Welfare, second elected governor of Cebu.^{[1]}
- Vicente Rama – (AB, 1904 Colegio Seminario de San Carlos) "The Father of Cebu City", former senator of the Philippines, 1st National Assemblyman, former Congressman of the third district of Cebu, 1st Mayor of Cebu City. He authored as primary sponsor of the bill making Cebu City a Chartered City.^{[2]}
- Mariano Jesus Cuenco – (AB, 1904 Colegio Seminario de San Carlos) fourth president of the Senate and former senator of the Philippines (1941–1964), former member of the House of Representatives, Governor of Cebu and Secretary of Public Works and Communication during the Phil. Commonwealth era.^{[2]}
- Vicente Sotto – (Elem & H.S., 1891 Colegio Seminario de San Carlos) former senator of the Philippines, considered the "Father of Cebuano Literature" and he was the main author of the Press Freedom Law (now known as the Sotto Law, Republic Act No. 53).^{[2]}
- Napoleon G. Rama, PLH – (AB & LLB, 1954) Award-winning journalist (Journalist of the Year), columnist, publisher of the Manila Bulletin, member of the 1986 Constitutional Commission, and in 1987, Floor Leader of the Constitutional Convention. Awarded the Premio Zobel in 1992. Ninoy Aquino Memorial Award 1990. Most Outstanding Alumnus of the University of San Carlos. Awarded the Philippine Legion of Honor/Order of Lakandula (Grand Commander) on February 26, 2011.^{[9]}
- Dionisio A. Jakosalem – (Elem & H.S., 1892 Colegio Seminario de San Carlos) former governor of Cebu, first Filipino to become a member of the official cabinet during the American Commonwealth regime. He was also part of the first Philippine Independence Mission which was sent to the United States under the leadership of former president Quezon.^{[7]}
- Sotero B. Cabahug – (AB, 1904 Colegio Seminario de San Carlos) former governor of Cebu, Member of the House of Representatives during the American Commonwealth regime. Post war Secretary of Public Works and Communications, Secretary of National Defense, and associate justice of the Court of Appeals (1956–1962).^{[3]}
- Filemon Sotto – (Elem & H.S., 1897 Colegio Seminario de San Carlos) former senator of the Philippines; he founded several newspapers among which were El Imperial, Ang Kaluwasan, La Opinion, and La Revolucion.^{[2]}
- Sergio Osmeña III – (AB, 1962) also known as Serge Osmeña, senator of the Philippines.^{[2]}
- Emilio Mario Osmeña – (BS Commerce, 1958) also known as Lito Osmeña, former governor of Cebu (1988–1992), founder and chairman of PROMDI Party (Probinsya Muna Development Initiative or Provinces First Development Initiative).^{[9]}
- John Henry Osmeña – (BS Mechanical Engineering, 1957) also known as Sonny Osmeña. Former senator of the Philippines, chair of the Senate Committee on Finance and Blue Ribbon Fact Finding Committee, authored and sponsored the Senate Bill on the Modernization and Expansion of the Energy Infrastructure of the Phils. and the Capability Development and Strengthening of the Department of Energy. Former member of the House of Representatives and former City Mayor of Toledo City, Cebu.^{[2]}
- Antonio Abad – (AB, 1914 Colegio Seminario de San Carlos) Premio Zobel winner in 1928 and 1929. He was a poet, fiction author, playwright and essayist.^{[7]}
- Miguel Cuenco – (AB, 1918 Colegio Seminario de San Carlos) former Congressman, 5th District of Cebu (1931–1965). He pursued studies on Diplomacy and International Relations at the Georgetown University in Washington D.C. after passing the bar as lawyer in the Phils.^{[8]}
- Hilario G. Davide, Jr. – (Honorary Alumnus) former Chief Justice of the Supreme Court. Permanent Ambassador to the United Nations in New York. He was also the Truth Commissioner of the Philippines. A recipient of the Papal Award the Pontifical Equestrian Order of St. Sylvester Pope and Martyr. He serves the USC board of trustees.^{[6]}
- Raul del Mar – (AA Pre Law, 1959) Congressman north district of Cebu City, former Deputy Speaker of the House of Representatives of the Philippines.^{[9]}
- Ramon Fernandez – (BS Commerce, 1972) PBA player and awarded most valuable player (MVP) in four (4) different seasons of the PBA.^{[9]}
- Aniano A. Desierto – (H.S. & AA, 1950) former Ombudsman of the Republic of the Philippines.^{[9]}
- Rene Espina – (H.S. & AA, 1951) former senator of the Philippines.^{[2]}
- Osmundo G. Rama – (BS and LLB) former Governor of the Cebu, former Vice Governor of Cebu, and former Councilor of Cebu City
- Lourdes Reynes Quisumbing, PhD – (MA Education, 1951) first female Secretary of Education (President Corazon Aquino administration), Culture and Sports. She is the president of the Asia-Pacific Network for International Education and Values Education (APNIEVE) and former president of Miriam College in Quezon City, Metro Manila.^{[5]}
- Pablo P. Garcia – (AB & LLB, 1950) former Congressman and Deputy Speaker of the House of Representatives, Congress of the Philippines. Served as Governor of Cebu from 1995 to 2004.^{[9]}
- Marcelo Briones Fernan – (Honorary Alumnus) former senator of the Philippines, Chief Justice of the Supreme Court and Senate President. He was a member of the USC board of trustees.^{[6]}
- Lauro Mumar – (AB, 1947 Colegio de San Carlos) former Filipino basketball player and later served as the national team head coach of India and the Philippines. He led the San Carlos College of Cebu City (now the University of San Carlos) to the first post-war Inter-Collegiate basketball championship in 1946.^{[7]}
- Hilario P. Davide III – (LLB, 1995) Governor of Cebu on June 30, 2013, to present, son of former Chief Justice Hilario Davide Jr. Former councilor of Cebu City and lawyer.^{[9]}
- John Geesnell Yap II – (BS Accountancy, 1998) Mayor of Tagbilaran City on June 30, 2013, to present, former councilor of Tagbilaran City and chief accountant of their family business at Bohol Tropics Resort; at age 38 he is one of the youngest city mayors in the country.^{[9]}
- Julius Caesar Herrera – (AB Political Science, 1976) Vice-Governor of Bohol, 2001 to 2010.^{[9]}
- Manuel C. Briones – (AB, 1913 Colegio Seminario de San Carlos) former senator of the Philippines.^{[2]}
- John Gokongwei, Jr. – (Elem & H.S. 1939 Colegio de San Carlos) Filipino Chinese business magnate, self-made billionaire, philanthropist, founder and chairman of JG Summit Holdings, one of the largest diversified conglomerates in the Phils. As of 2015, Gokongwei is the second richest person in the Philippines with a net worth of $5.5 billion, ranking behind only Henry Sy, the Phils. richest person. He was conferred an honorary Doctor of Science degree in business and enterprise development by USC in 2004 for his contribution to the economic growth and development of the country's commerce, trade and industry.^{[9]}
- Eugene Acevedo – (BS Physics, magna cum laude 1984) former president and CEO of the Philippine National Bank (PNB).^{[9]}
- Roy V. Kyamko, Lt. Gen. AFP – (AB, 1962) retired lieutenant general and commanding general of the Armed Forces of the Philippines Southern Command (Southcom) during operations against the Abu Sayyaf Group in 2004. Upon retirement from active military service he was appointed by President Gloria Arroyo as Undersecretary of the Department of Energy in 2007 and in concurrent capacity as executive director of the Presidential Task Force on the Security of Energy Facilities and Enforcement of Energy Laws and Standards.^{[9]}
- Erlinda Kintanar Alburo, PhD – (AB, 1964) the "Schovocate" of Heritage and Literary Scholarship, she is a contemporary scholar and advocate of Cebuano language and literature as former director of USC's Cebuano Studies Center. A recipient of several local and national awards, Best Research Program Award of CHED Region VII in 2008, the National Commission of Culture & Arts Literary Award in 2010, and the Gawad Paz Marquez Benitez Award of 2015 as an outstanding Philippine literature teacher and researcher. Presently, she is a commissioner of Cebu City Historical and Cultural Affairs since 2010.^{[18]}
- Ernesto Pernia, PhD – (AB Economics, magna cum laude 1967) Secretary of Economic Development and Planning and director general of National Economic and Development Authority (NEDA) under the President Duterte administration cabinet, former lead economist, Economics and Research Department (ERD) of Asian Development Bank (ADB), Formerly principal economist and senior economist of ADB. He was also regional adviser on population and employment policy and research for Asia and the Pacific, International Labour Office (Bangkok) and research fellow, East-West Center Resource Systems Institute, Honolulu. He has a Ph.D. from the University of California, Berkeley, an M.A. (economics) from the University of Bridgeport, Connecticut, and an A.B. (economics) at USC. Former chair and member of the USC board of trustees, professor emeritus in economics at UP Diliman. Recently in February 2015 the Philippine-American Academy of Science and Engineering (PASSE) awarded him Leadership in Science and Economics for his excellence in policy research and publications of social sciences, economics and technology in national development.^{[19]}
- Resil Mojares, PhD – (AB & MA, 1967) Filipino historian and critic; he was Founding Director (1975–1996) of USC's Cebuano Studies Center, a pioneering local studies center in the Philippines. Visiting professor in leading Ivy league universities in the US, Canada, UK and Europe.^{[9]}
- Edgardo Delos Santos – (AB & LLB, 1977) 186th Associate Justice of the Supreme Court of the Philippines. Former Executive Justice and Associate Justice of the Court of Appeals stationed in Cebu City. Former Presiding Judge of the Regional Trial Court in Bacolod City and known as a "no nonsense" judge when he tried a number of celebrated and controversial criminal cases. Former Presiding Judge of the Municipal Trial Court in Cities in Dumaguete City. Former Municipal Trial Court Judge in the Municipality of Siaton. Former Court Confidential Attorney and Technical Assistant of Associate Justice (later Chief Justice) Felix V. Makasiar of the Supreme Court of the Philippines. He is a recipient of several awards including the following: 2016 Ulirang Ama Sectoral Award for Law and Judiciary, 2009 Outstanding Palomponganon Award, 2008 Outstanding Law Alumnus of the University of San Carlos, Supreme Court En Banc Congratulatory Resolution (Re: Gender Justice Awards [A.M. No. 04-8-13-SC, August 24, 2004]), Novel Decision Award (Gender Justice Awards), Special Award on Women's Advocacy (Soroptimists Awards), and Community Relations Award (NARCOM). He was also nominated twice (2006 and 2007) to be an awardee of Judicial Excellence. ^{[21]}
- Filipina B. Sotto - (BS & MS Marine Biology, 1978/1980) Filipino marine biologist. She pursued doctoral studies in Tokyo University of Fisheries (now Tokyo University of Marine Science & Technology). Currently serving as a Commissioner of the Philippine Commission on Sports SCUBA Diving (PCSSD) of the Department of Tourism since 2015.
- Glenn A. Chong – (LLB, cum laude 1998) former provincial governor and Congressman of Biliran, Eastern Visayas. He implemented various education and health programs in Biliran such as mobile clinics for the barangays, public school bus services, internet connectivity in public schools and establishment of Naval State University. He was conferred Doctor of Humanities honoris causa degree by the Naval State University in 2010 and recipient of Young Leadership Award by Ateneo School of Governance in Manila and German Foundation Konrad Adenauer Stiftung.^{[9]}

== References and footnotes ==
1. Sergio Osmena Sr./ President of the Philippines / Biography / www.britannica.com
2. Senators of the Philippines / Profile / senate.gov.ph
3. Sotero B. Cabahug/ Secretary of National Defense / www.dnd.gov.ph / sotero-b-cabahug.html
4. Dr. Jesus Estanislao / https://www.iese.edu/faculty-research/faculty/jesu-/
5. Dr. Lourdes Quisumbing / www.deped.gov.ph / former secretary profile / Dr. Lourdes Quisumbing
6. Former Chief Justice of Supreme Court Profile / www.supremecourtphils.gov.ph. / marcelo_fernan / hilario_davide_sr.
7. Cebuano Studies Center / www.cebuanostudiescenter.com / prominent Cebuanos
8. Miguel Cuenco – CEBUpedia By Clarence Paul Oaminal (The Freeman). Updated April 29, 2014. www.philstar.com/freeman-opinion
9. Carolinians Inc. / outstanding alumni / www.usc.edu.ph
10. Alvin N. Garcia – J.P. Garcia & Associates / jpgarcialaw.com/lawyers/atty-alvin-b-garcia
11. Stephen Sy Gaisano – Cebu Business, The Freeman / Updated 10.19.2005 / www.philstar.com/cebu-business/gaisano-family
12. Benito Gaisano – Benito Gaisano:Entrepreneur of the Year/ Everything Cebu/ www.everythingcebu.com / benito-gaisano-entrepreneur-of-the-year
13. Alberto Villarosa – Security Bank Corp. Profile & Biography/ www.securitybank.com/news/alberto-villarosa
14. Pio Castillo and Dennis Wong – International Pharmaceuticals Inc. (IPI) / ipi-phil.com
15. Pericles Dakay – Dr. Pericles Dakay / Construction Industry Authority of the Phils./www.ciap.dti.gov.ph/pericles-p-dakay
16. Mariquita Salimbangon Yeung – Everything Cebu / www.everythingcebu.com/lifestyle/people/mariquita-salimbangon-yeung
17. "Cebuana Trailblazers Sugboanang Tag-una" – Law Center Inc. / www.womenlawcenter.org/trailblazers.htm
18. Ernesto M. Pernia – University of the Philippines (UP) School of Economics / www.econ.upd.edu.ph/about-upse/faculty/empernia
19. Zenaida Ygnacio Monsada – Department of Energy Portal, Philippines / www.doe.gov.ph/about-doe/doe-officials
20. Court of Appeals Philippines / ca.judiciary.gov.ph/ justices
21. Maj. Gen. Joseph Cabides, Arm Forces of the Phils. Reserve Command / www.afp.mil.ph /reserve-command / Joseph Cabides
22. Espina Architects / www.espinaarchitects.com
23. Engr. Fortunato O. Sanchez, Engineering Contractors & Consultants, Cebu City, Phils.
24. About PERT Inc./ pertinc.com/about-us.php
25. Bunny Pages / www.philstar.com/the-freeman/cebu-business/2015/06/30
26. Philip N. Tan / www.mandauechamber.org/philip-tan sntpost.stii.dost.gov.ph/technologyadaptors/Philip_Tan
27. Ernesto Codina – www.elab.ph/forum/index-php 10 Greatest Filipino Engineers and Scientists
28. Evelyn B. Taboada, PhD / www.researchgate.net/profile/Evelyn_Taboada
29. Mel Cenen Sarmiento / www.dilg.ph.com/ about-dilg secretary/ Mel Cenen Sarmiento
30. Rebecca S. Flores / www.sanmiguelcorp.ph.com/brewery/corporate management/profile/Rebecca S. Flores
31. Ana Liza Aleta / www.aboitizpowercorp.ph.com/ corporate management/profile/ Ana Liza Aleta
32. Alumni US and Canada / University of San Carlos / Cebu City, Philippines / Alumnus.net
