= Climaco =

Climaco is both a Portuguese and Spanish given name and a surname. Notable people with the name include:

== Given names ==
- Clímaco Calderón (1852–1913), Colombian lawyer and politician
- Clímaco Cañarte (born 1936), Ecuadorian footballer
- Clímaco Jacinto Zarauz Carrillo (1926–2017), Ecuadorian Roman Catholic bishop
- Climaco Rodríguez, Uruguayan footballer

== Middle names ==
- Leandro Climaco Pinto (born 1994), Brazilian footballer
- Virgílio Clímaco Damásio (1838–1913), Brazilian physician and politician

== Surnames ==
- Aiko Climaco (born 1989), Filipina actress, model and comedian
- Arsenio Climaco (1870–1952), Filipino politician
- Beng Climaco (born 1966), Filipina politician
- Cesar Climaco (1916–1984), Filipino politician
- Eládio Clímaco (born 1941), Portuguese television presenter
- José Clímaco (1924–1985), Filipino film director
- Juan Clímaco (1859–1907), Filipino politician
