= Governor of Cebu =

Local chief executive

- Gobernador sa Probinsya sa Sugbo
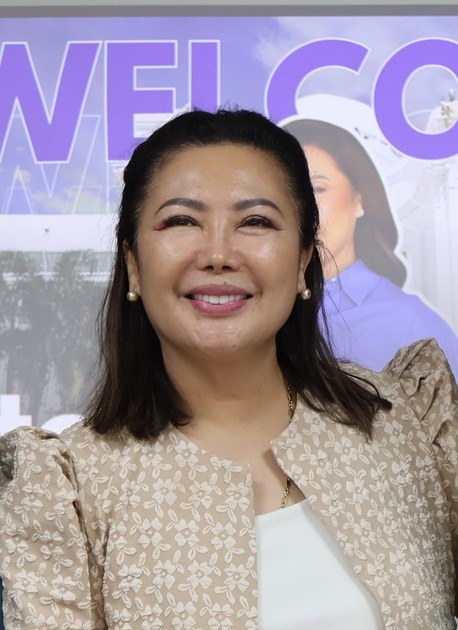
- Incumbent; Pam Baricuatro since June 30, 2025
- Style: The Honorable
- Seat: Cebu Provincial Capitol
- Appointer: Elected via popular vote
- Term length: 3 years, not eligible for re-election immediately after three consecutive terms
- Inaugural holder: Miguel Lopez de Legazpi
- Formation: August 6, 1569

The governor of Cebu (Filipino: Punong Lalawigan ng Cebu) is the chief executive of the provincial government of Cebu, Philippines. The first governor appointed by the Spanish Crown was Miguel Lopez de Legazpi, and during the American Era, Julio Llorente became governor on April 16, 1899, although Luis Flores and Arcadio Maxilom served in the same position in 1898 and 1899, respectively.

The incumbent governor is Pamela Baricuatro, who is currently serving since June 30, 2025. She defeated Gwendolyn Garcia in an upset victory as someone who has never held an elective office.

== History ==
On August 6, 1569, King Philip II appointed Miguel Lopez de Legazpi as the first governor of the province of Cebu. His appointment was conducted just a few years after the Spanish settlement was established on the island.

The Cebu provincial government was divided into rival factions before the impending U.S. invasion in 1899. On December 30, 1898, Luis Flores was elected and assumed office as governor the next day, with his office being confirmed in another election held on January 10, 1899. Flores remained governor outside of the city even while Julio Llorente became governor on April 16, 1899. The situation was further complicated when on March 29, 1899, General Arcadio Maxilom was appointed military governor during the resistance against the American forces.

== List of governors of Cebu ==
List of governors of Cebu
No.	Portrait	Governor	Term	Place of origin	Ref.
1		Julio A. Llorente; May 22, 1863 – 1955 (age 91–92)	1899–1901	Argao, Cebu	
2		Juan Clímaco; December 24, 1859 – July 16, 1907 (age 47)	1902–1906	Toledo, Cebu	
3		Sergio Osmeña; September 9, 1878 – October 19, 1961 (age 83)	1906–1907	Cebu City, Cebu	
4		Dionisio Jakosalem; May 8, 1878 – July 1, 1931 (age 53)	1907–1912	Dumanjug, Cebu	
5		Manuel A. Roa; 1872 – ????	1912–1922	Cebu City, Cebu	
6		Arsenio Climaco; June 24, 1870 – November 15, 1952 (age 82)	1922–1930	Toledo, Cebu	
7		Mariano Jesús Cuenco; January 16, 1888 – February 25, 1964 (age 76)	1931–1934	Carmen, Cebu	
8		Sotero Cabahug; April 22, 1891 – December 15, 1963 (age 72)	1934–1937	Mandaue, Cebu	
9		Buenaventura P. Rodriguez; July 14, 1893 – December 9, 1940 (Age 47)	1937–1940	Bogo, Cebu	
10		Hilario Abellana; October 23, 1896 – January 15, 1945 (Age 48)	1941–1943	Cebu City, Cebu	
11		Jose Delgado	1943–1944	Cebu City, Cebu	
12		Jose Leyson; April 23, 1895 – 1945 (Age 49 or 50)	1944–1945	Cebu City, Cebu	
13		Fructuoso B. Cabahug; January 20, 1897 – December 24, 1961 (Age 64)	1945–1946	Mandaue, Cebu	
14		Manuel A. Cuenco; November 10, 1907 – October 18, 1970 (Age 62)	1946–1951	Cebu City, Cebu	
15		Sergio Osmeña Jr. December 4, 1916 – March 26, 1984 (Age 67)	1951–1955	Cebu City, Cebu	
16		Jose Briones; February 10, 1916 – ????	1956–1961	Mandaue, Cebu	
17		Francisco Remotigue; July 14, 1908 – April 29, 1995 (Age 86)	1961–1963	Argao, Cebu	
18		Rene Espina; December 6, 1929 – September 13, 2019 (Age 89)	1964–1969	Cebu City, Cebu	
19		Osmundo Rama; September 23, 1914 – November 13, 1998 (Age 84)	1969–1976	Cebu City, Cebu	
20		Eduardo Gullas; October 13, 1930 – November 6, 2025 (Age 95)	1976–1986	Cebu City, Cebu	
21		Osmundo Rama; September 23, 1914 – November 13, 1998 (Age 84)	1986–1988	Cebu City, Cebu	
22		Lito Osmeña; September 11, 1938 – July 19, 2021 (Age 82)	1988–1992	Cebu City, Cebu	
23		Vicente dela Serna; September 13, 1951 – September 1, 2018 (Age 66)	1992–1995	Butuan, Agusan del Norte	
24		Pablo P. Garcia; September 25, 1925 – August 18, 2021 (Age 95)	1995–2004	Dumanjug, Cebu	
25		Gwendolyn Garcia; October 12, 1955 (Age 70)	2004–2012	Cebu City, Cebu	
—		Agnes Magpale (acting); January 21, 1942 (Age 84)	2012– 2013	Danao, Cebu	
26	Hilario Davide III	Hilario Davide III; August 25, 1964 (Age 62)	2013–2019	Cebu City, Cebu	
27	Gwendolyn Garcia	Gwendolyn Garcia; October 12, 1955 (Age 70)	2019–2025	Cebu City, Cebu	
28	Pamela Baricuatro	Pam Baricuatro; November 9, 1966 (Age 59)	2025–2026	Pinamungajan, Cebu	

List of disputed governors of Cebu
No.	Portrait	Governor	Term	Place of origin	Ref.
1		Luis Flores (Birth and death dates unknown)	1898–1899	Samar	
2		Arcadio Maxílom; November 13, 1862 – August 10, 1924 (age 61)	1899–1901	Tuburan, Cebu	

== Elections ==
- 2001 Cebu local elections
- 2004 Cebu local elections
- 2007 Cebu local elections
- 2010 Cebu local elections
- 2013 Cebu local elections
- 2016 Cebu local elections
- 2019 Cebu local elections
- 2022 Cebu local elections
- 2025 Cebu local elections
- 2028 Cebu local elections

== See also ==
- List of vice governors of Cebu
