= Juan Alcazaren =

Filipino Visayan lawyer and Congressman of Cebu 4th District from 1925-1936

The Honourable Juan Alcazaren
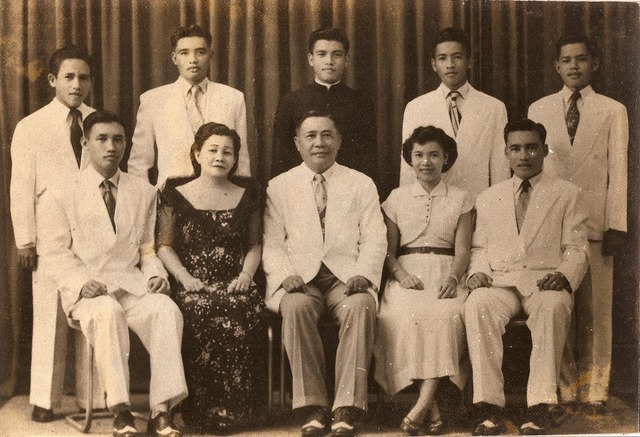
- Juan Alcazaren (center from the second row) with his family

Member of the House of Representatives for Cebu's 4th District
- In office 1925–1936
- Preceded by: Isidoro Aldanese
- Succeeded by: Agustin Kintanar

Director of Bureau of Land
- In office 1945–1945

Undersecretary of the Department of Foreign Affairs
- In office 1958–1959
- Succeeded by: Fructuoso Cabahug

Personal details
- Born: December 27, 1891 Argao, Cebu
- Died: February 1, 1959 (Aged 67) Quezon City
- Party: Nacionalista
- Education: University of the Philippines
- Profession: Lawyer

Juan Fuentes Alcazaren (December 27, 1891 – February 1, 1959) was a Filipino Visayan lawyer, legislator, and politician. He was Member of the House of Representatives for the old 4th legislative district of Cebu (1925–1934), Director of Bureau of Lands (1945), and Undersecretary of Department of Foreign Affairs (1958–1959).

== Early life ==
Juan F. Alcazaren, the son of Leocadio Alcazaren and Calixta Fuentes, was born in Argao, Cebu on December 27, 1891. He studied at the University of the Philippines and became a lawyer on September 24, 1921. On December 27, 1922, he married Corazon Maria de los Nieves L. Albaracin, who was the daughter of then municipal president (equivalent of mayor) of Argao, Don Lorenzo Albaracin, and Candelaria.

== Career ==
Practicing law, he once worked with the University of Manila.

=== Congressman ===
In 1925, he ran and won as representative of Cebu's old 4th congressional district in the 7th Philippine Legislature. Campaigning under the Nacionalista Party, his other party members such as Pedro Rodriguez for the Senate seat, Arsenio Climaco for governor, representatives Manuel Briones, Paulino Gullas, Mariano Jesus Cuenco, and Paulino Ybanez also won. Alcazaren was elected for two more terms: in 1928 for the 8th Philippine Legislature and in 1931 to 1934 for the 9th Philippine Legislature.

=== Bureau of Lands ===
On December 22, 1945, he was appointed by then President Sergio Osmeña as the Director of the Bureau of Lands, ad interim.

=== Department of Foreign Affairs ===
On March 19, 1958, he was later appointed by then President Carlos P. Garcia as undersecretary of the Department of Foreign Affairs. He served in the said position until his demise in early 1959 Fructuoso Cabahug was appointed undersecretary to replace him on June 1, 1959.

== Later years ==
Alcazaren died on February 1, 1959, in Quezon City. He was 67. A resolution was filed in the House of Representatives in extending condolences for his passing.

== Historical commemoration ==
- The Juan Alcazaren Street located in Barangay Poblacion, Argao, Cebu was named in his honor.
