= Segundo Singson =

Filipino Visayan Vice Governor of Cebu from 1899 to 1900

The Honourable Segundo Singson

Vice Governor of Cebu
- In office 1899–1900
- Preceded by: Julio A. Llorente
- Succeeded by: Francisco Emilio F. Remotigue

Segundo Singson was a lawyer, judge, and politician from Cebu, Philippines. He was Judge of the Court of First Instance during the American occupation and the former Vice Governor of the province of Cebu (1899–1900).

== Early life ==
Segundo Singson was the son of the wealthy Mariano Singson and admitted to the Philippine Bar on April 29, 1902. Later, he married Filomena Regis and the couple had a son named Juan. When Regis died, Singson remarried and his second wife, Eleuteria Tuico, bore children namely Paz, Genoveva, Rosario, and Concepcion.

== Career ==
Practicing law, he was considered one of the prominent lawyer in his time. He was appointed fiscal together with Miguel Logarta when the Royal Audiencia was inaugurated in Cebu on July 1, 1887.

On June 18, 1898, Emilio Aguinaldo issued a decree declaring Julio Llorente and Segundo Singson as Vice President (equivalent of Vice Governor) of the Cebu province. On January 24, 1899, Aguinaldo approved the provincial council of Cebu in the newly established Philippine Republic and Singson was appointed councilor of justice. He was the acting Governor when Julio Llorente, the governor of the province of Cebu appointed by the Americans, was called by General Elwell Stephen Otis in Manila and served as a magistrate in the Supreme Court.

He was then appointed judge of the Court of First Instance.
