= Carmen, Cebu =

Municipality in Cebu, Philippines

Carmen
- Municipality
- Municipality of Carmen
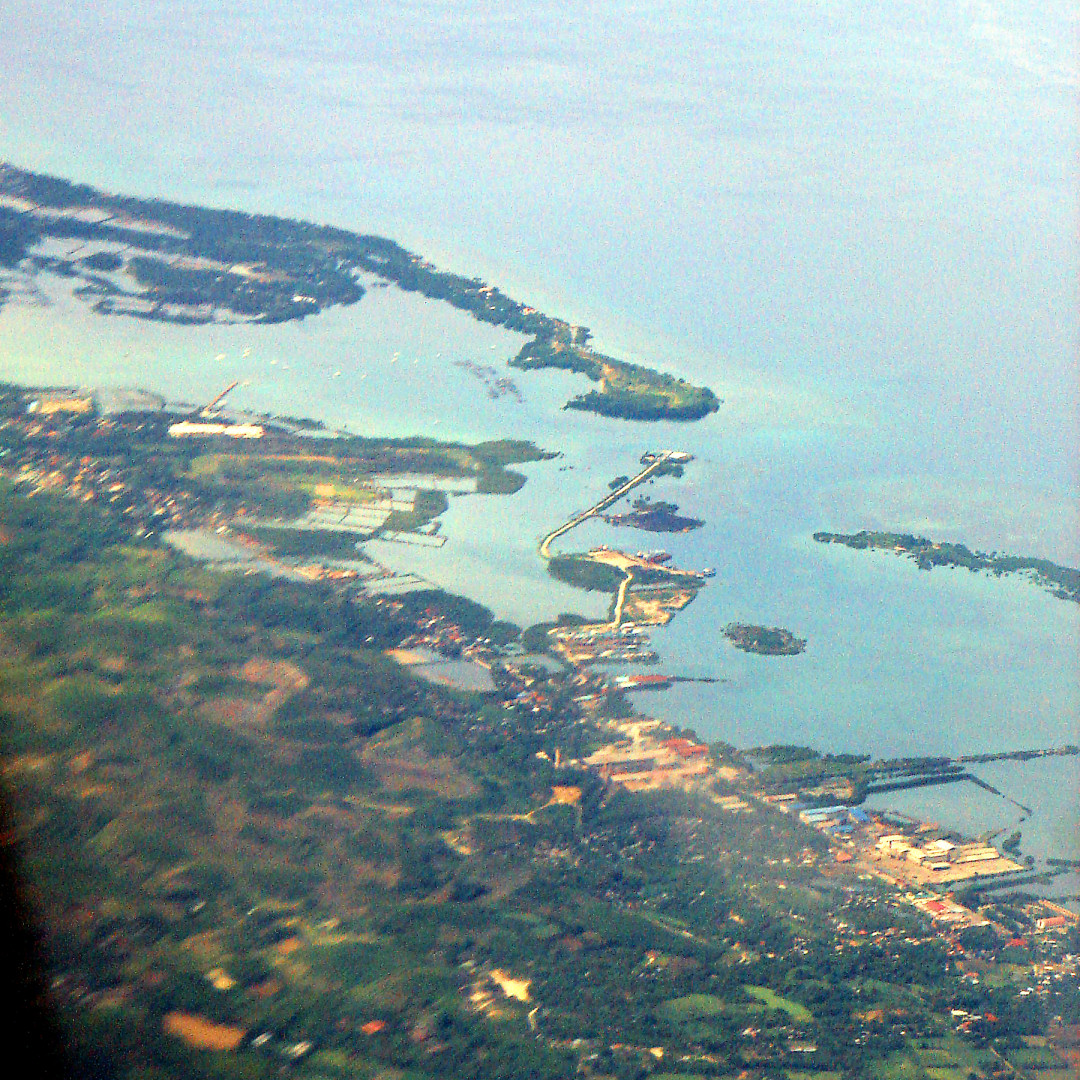
- Carmen from above

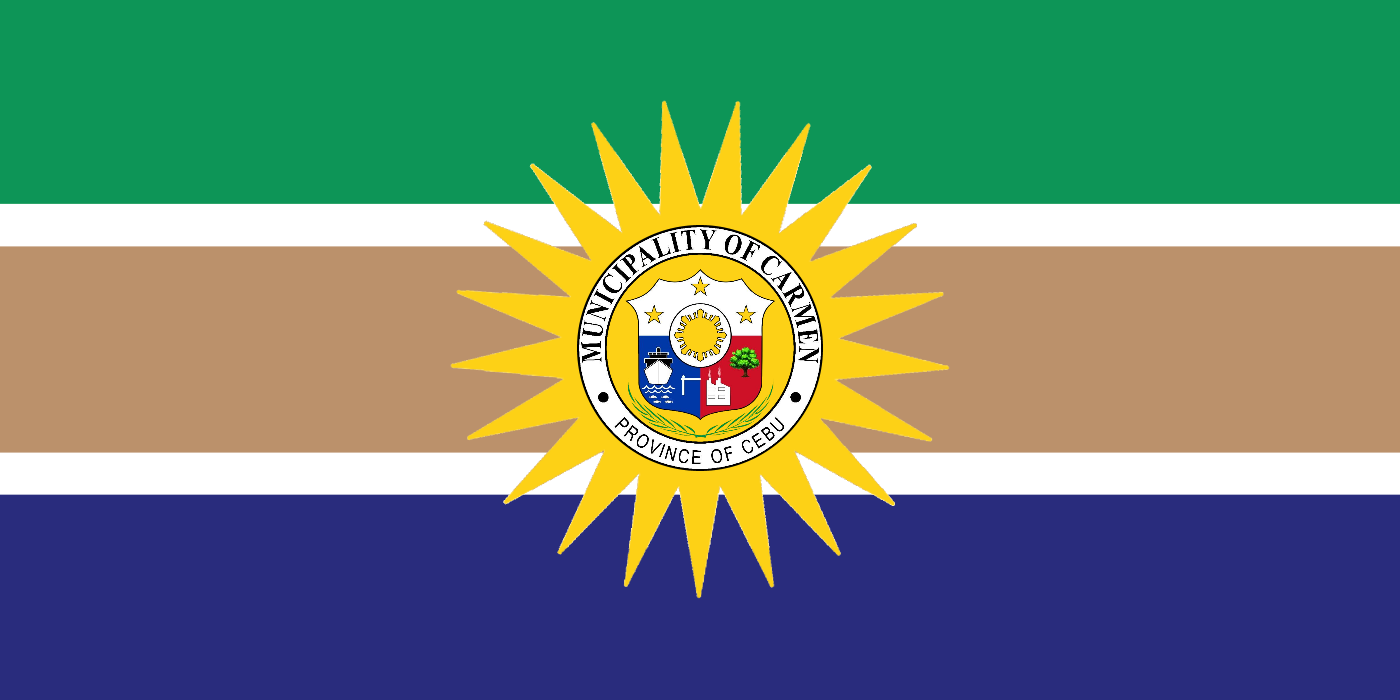
- Flag

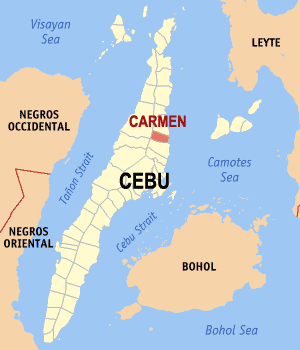
- Map of Cebu with Carmen highlighted
- Interactive map of Carmen
- Location within the Philippines
- Coordinates: 10°35′N 123°58′E
- Country: Philippines
- Region: Central Visayas
- Province: Cebu
- District: 5th district
- Founded: 1851
- Barangays: 21 (see Barangays)

Government
  - Type: Sangguniang Bayan
  - Mayor: Carlo Mariano T. Villamor
  - Vice Mayor: Martin Gerard T. Villamor
  - Representative: Vincent Franco D. Frasco
  - Municipal Council: Members: Al Silvestre B. Damiles; Carlyle Allen M. Pono; Rashid B. Tacocong; Edward A. Tacocong; Baltazar B. Capuno; Arianne Batao-Pono; Maximiano T. Into Jr.; Aireen A. Bontia
  - Electorate: 40,904 voters (2025)

Area
  - Total: 84.78 km^{2} (32.73 sq mi)
- Elevation: 83 m (272 ft)
- Highest elevation: 655 m (2,149 ft)
- Lowest elevation: 0 m (0 ft)

Population (2024 census)
  - Total: 60,230
  - Density: 710.4/km^{2} (1,840/sq mi)
  - Households: 13,562

Economy
  - Income class: 1st municipal income class
  - Poverty incidence: 21.1% (2023)
  - Revenue: ₱ 279.1 million (2024)
  - Assets: ₱ 1,022 million (2024)
  - Expenditure: ₱ 220.2 million (2024)
  - Liabilities: ₱ 122.4 million (2024)

Service provider
  - Electricity: Cebu 2 Electric Cooperative (CEBECO 2)
- Time zone: UTC+8 (PST)
- ZIP code: 6005
- PSGC: 072215000
- IDD : area code: +63 (0)32
- Native languages: Cebuano; Tagalog
- Website: carmencebu.gov.ph

Carmen, officially the Municipality of Carmen (Cebuano: Dakbayan sa Carmen; Tagalog: Bayan ng Carmen), is a municipality in the province of Cebu, Philippines. According to the 2024 census, it has a population of 60,230 people.

The town fiesta is celebrated every 28 August in honor of St. Augustine of Hippo.

== History ==
The town of Carmen was formerly known as Bugho, it became a municipality on June 16, 1851, through the efforts of Facundo Buot. The first municipal president was Fabio Buot when the first elections was held by the Americans in 1899.

The town of Carmen in Cebu, Philippines, was named after the Spanish word "Carmen," which is often associated with the Virgin Mary under the title "Our Lady of Mount Carmel" or "Nuestra Señora del Carmen" in Spanish. This is a common practice in the Philippines, where many towns and cities were named by Spanish colonizers in honor of religious figures, saints, or places in Spain.

Carmen, Cebu, was established as a municipality during the Spanish colonial period, and it’s likely that the name was chosen to reflect the deep Catholic faith of the local population. "Carmen" in this context could refer to the religious devotion to Our Lady of Mount Carmel, which is celebrated in many parts of the Catholic world.

== Geography ==
Carmen is bordered on the north by the town of Catmon, to the west by the town of Tuburan, on the east by the Camotes Sea, and on the south by the City of Danao. It is 41 kilometres (25 mi) from Cebu City.

=== Barangays ===
Carmen is politically subdivided into 21 barangays. Each barangay consists of puroks and some have sitios.

PSGC	Barangay	Population			±% p.a.	
		2024		2010		
072215001	Baring	8.1%	4,854	3,974	▴	1.40%
072215002	Cantipay	3.0%	1,805	1,608	▴	0.80%
072215004	Cantukong	2.4%	1,445	1,171	▴	1.47%
072215003	Cantumog	3.1%	1,895	1,555	▴	1.38%
072215005	Caurasan	1.8%	1,109	1,031	▴	0.51%
072215009	Cogon East	5.5%	3,292	3,182	▴	0.24%
072215021	Cogon West	4.8%	2,881	2,648	▴	0.59%
072215006	Corte	4.3%	2,567	2,411	▴	0.44%
072215007	Dawis Norte	6.9%	4,155	3,581	▴	1.04%
072215008	Dawis Sur	3.3%	2,001	1,928	▴	0.26%
072215010	Hagnaya	3.4%	2,019	1,756	▴	0.97%
072215011	Ipil	3.4%	2,061	1,930	▴	0.46%
072215012	Lanipga	1.7%	1,021	695	▴	2.70%
072215013	Liboron	1.0%	603	550	▴	0.64%
072215014	Lower Natimao‑an	2.1%	1,241	1,219	▴	0.12%
072215015	Luyang	9.7%	5,869	3,980	▴	2.73%
072215016	Poblacion	8.0%	4,845	4,516	▴	0.49%
072215017	Puente	3.9%	2,374	2,175	▴	0.61%
072215018	Sac‑on	1.4%	817	740	▴	0.69%
072215019	Triumfo	3.1%	1,867	1,570	▴	1.21%
072215020	Upper Natimao‑an	4.3%	2,604	2,428	▴	0.49%
	Total		60,230	44,648	▴	2.10%

=== Climate ===
Climate data for Carmen, Cebu
Month	Jan	Feb	Mar	Apr	May	Jun	Jul	Aug	Sep	Oct	Nov	Dec	Year
Mean daily maximum °C (°F)	28 (82)	29 (84)	30 (86)	31 (88)	31 (88)	30 (86)	30 (86)	30 (86)	30 (86)	29 (84)	29 (84)	28 (82)	30 (85)
Mean daily minimum °C (°F)	23 (73)	23 (73)	23 (73)	24 (75)	25 (77)	25 (77)	25 (77)	25 (77)	25 (77)	25 (77)	24 (75)	23 (73)	24 (75)
Average precipitation mm (inches)	70 (2.8)	49 (1.9)	62 (2.4)	78 (3.1)	138 (5.4)	201 (7.9)	192 (7.6)	185 (7.3)	192 (7.6)	205 (8.1)	156 (6.1)	111 (4.4)	1,639 (64.6)
Average rainy days	13.4	10.6	13.1	14.5	24.2	27.9	28.4	27.7	27.1	27.4	22.5	15.9	252.7
Source: Meteoblue (Use with caution: this is modeled/calculated data, not measured locally.)

== Demographics ==
Population census of Carmen
Year	Pop.	±% p.a.
1903	6,821	—
1918	9,645	+2.34%
1939	11,801	+0.97%
1948	10,802	−0.98%
1960	13,541	+1.90%
1970	19,954	+3.95%
1975	22,183	+2.15%
1980	24,197	+1.75%
1990	29,265	+1.92%
1995	32,357	+1.90%
2000	37,351	+3.12%
2007	41,279	+1.39%
2010	44,648	+2.90%
2015	51,325	+2.69%
2020	57,897	+2.57%
2024	60,230	+0.95%
Source: Philippine Statistics Authority

== Economy ==
Poverty incidence of Carmen (%)

Source: Philippine Statistics Authority

Mandaue City-based Shemberg Marketing Corporation, the world's number one supplier of refined carrageenan since 2005, owns and operates the Shemberg Biotech Corporation located in Barangay Cogon West.

The famous 7D mango product manufacturer FPD Foods International Inc. has one of its branches located at Dawis Norte, Carmen, Cebu.

Metro, a stand-alone supermarket opens branch in Carmen, Cebu. Located at the heart of the town's commercial area near the town's public market.

A famous exporter of home decors and furniture maker Yoshio Home Decors also provides employment in the town as well as additional revenue for the local government.

Carmen is also known for its homegrown signature product sinamay, made of abaca. Thus, making the town as "The sinamay capital of Cebu". These sinamay products are weaved by the locals with such quality standard.

== Tourism ==
Carmen is home to the Cebu Safari and Adventure Park, an adventure and safari park, located in the municipality's barangay Corte. The park opened in 2018 and is a popular tourist destination not just for Carmen, but for Cebu as a whole. Since the early 2000s, the barangay has also been home to a monastery of the Sylvestrines, a Benedictine monastic order, established by monks from Sri Lanka.

Before Sinulog started in Cebu City in 1980, the town of Carmen had already dancing the beat and rhythm similar to that of the Sinulog way back in 1974. It was started by Fr. Jose Motus, the parish priest, and then-mayor Benyong Villamor, and patterned it from his hometown's festival, the Ati-Atihan of Kalibo, Aklan. During its launching it was named Ati-Atihan sa Carmen, but renamed Sinulog sa Carmen the following year. From then on, the Sinulog sa Carmen is held in every second Sunday of January, just a week before the Sinulog Grand Parade in Cebu City. Participating contingents dance their way around the municipality to honor the Santo Niño. However, given the popularity of the latter, the date was moved to the Sunday following the feast, bringing it in line with the Dinagyang Festival of Iloilo.

== Notable personalities ==
- Mariano Jesus Cuenco - former Senator and the fourth Senate President.
- Jose Maria Cuenco - the first Archbishop of the Archdiocese of Jaro.
- Reed Juntilla - former PBA player.

== See also ==
- Municipalities of the Philippines
- Legislative districts of Cebu
- Cebu
- Central Visayas
- Carrageenan
- Benson Dakay
