= Jose Leyson =

Filipino Visayan lawyer, politician, and World War II Cebu governor

The Honorable Jose S. Leyson
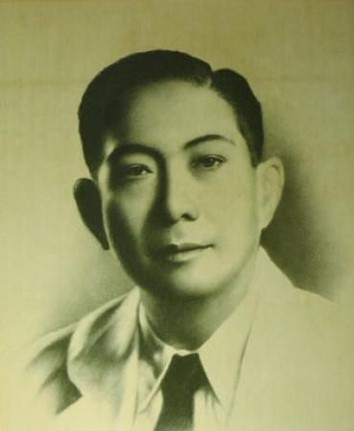

12th Governor of Cebu
- In office 1944–1945
- Preceded by: Jose Delgado
- Succeeded by: Fructuoso B. Cabahug

Member of the National Assembly from Cebu
- In office September 25, 1943 – February 2, 1944 Serving with Jose Delgado

Personal details
- Born: April 23, 1895 Cebu, Captaincy General of the Philippines
- Died: 1945 (aged 49–50) Cebu City, Philippine Commonwealth
- Party: KALIBAPI (c. 1943)
- Spouse: Lourdes Velez
- Education: Colegio de San Carlos; University of the Philippines College of Law
- Profession: Lawyer

José S. Leyson y Floreta (April 23, 1895 – 1945) was a Filipino Visayan lawyer and politician from Cebu, Philippines. He was appointed by the Japanese forces to serve as governor of the province of Cebu during World War II. He died before World War II ended, and the whereabouts of his remains are unknown.

== Early life ==
Jose Leyson was born on April 23, 1895 in Cebu. He attended Colegio de San Carlos (now University of San Carlos), acquired a law degree at the University of the Philippines College of Law, and became a lawyer on November 15, 1923.

== Personal life ==
Leyson was married to Lourdes Velez.

== Career ==
He worked as general manager of Cebu Transit Company, a bus company in operation before the war. In social circles, he was known for his stylish dressing and as "Beau Brommel", and was described as fun-loving and sociable.

Leyson, along with Manuel Gotianuy and Lim Bonfing, was one of the co-founders and incorporators of the Union Surety and Insurance Corporation, a non-life insurance company, established on July 14, 1931. The company was later renamed Visayan Surety and Insurance Corporation a month later. Leyson served as the company's vice-president and secretary.

On October 2, 1939, his appointment by then President Manuel L. Quezon as member of the Board of Tax Appeals of Cebu City, together with that of Vicente Urgello, was confirmed by the Commission on Appointment. On December 10, 1940, he was elected as a member of the Cebu Provincial Board with Fructuoso Cabahug.

== During World War II ==
During World War II, Jose Leyson was forced by the Japanese to serve the government. He became the de facto governor when Hilario Abellana escaped to the town of Badian on the eve of the Japanese landings on April 10, 1942, and he interacted with the Japanese in their attempt to install a civilian government. In addition, he had visited Japan previously on an educational exchange program when he was a law student at the University of the Philippines. Abellana soon returned to Cebu City and resumed the role of governor, while Leyson became vice governor.

Due to the instability in politics at the time, scholars had difficulty determining the administrations of war-time governors Abellana, Leyson, and Jose Delgado, who was the Cebu City mayor before the coming of the Japanese forces. According to the Governor's Gallery installed in the Cebu Provincial Capitol, his term was placed between 1944 and 1945. He participated in the assembly called by KALIBAPI (Kapisanan sa Paglilingkod sa Bagong Pilipino), the group that replaced political parties, that ratified the Constitution on September 7, 1943. When the National Assembly convened in 1943, he was one of the representatives of Cebu together with Delgado.

Before the end of the war, he was killed and his remains have never been found. There are several accounts that explained his death, one of which was that he was held as hostage by the Japanese army in their retreat towards the northern part of Cebu and then he was executed. Another account claimed that together with Paulino Gullas and other Cebuano officials, he was taken by the Japanese to the Babag Ridge area and died when Americans bombed the cave in which they were hiding. Leyson was hailed as a hero and martyr.

== Historical commemoration ==
Governor Jose S. Leyson Street, formerly known as Progreso Street, was named in his honor in accordance to the Cebu City Council enacted on August 5, 1971. On October 12, 2018, the ordinance was implemented by unveiling the street sign in Barangay Ermita, Cebu City.
