= Manuel A. Roa =

Filipino Visayan politician and former Cebu governor from 1912-1921

The Honorable Manuel A. Roa
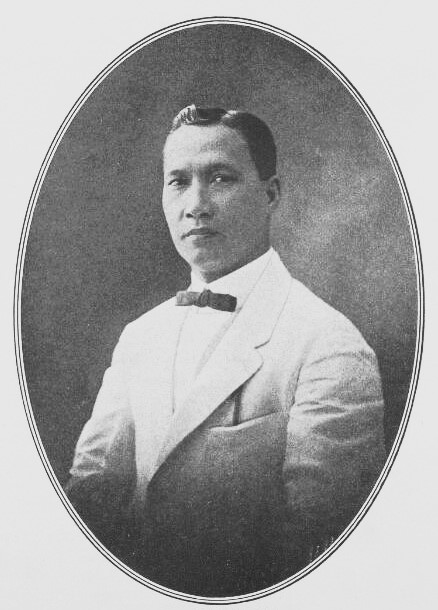

5th Governor of Cebu
- In office 1912–1921
- Preceded by: Dionisio A. Jakosalem
- Succeeded by: Arsenio V. Climaco

Personal details
- Born: 1872 Cebu City, Cebu, Captaincy General of the Philippines
- Died: Unknown
- Party: Nacionalista Party

Manuel A. Roa (born in 1872) was a Filipino Visayan politician from Cebu, Philippines. He was elected governor of Cebu and served from 1912 until 1922 and served twice as member of the Cebu Provincial Board (1909-1910 and 1937–1940).

== Early life ==
Manuel A. Roa was born to an old merchant family in Cebu City in 1872 and one of the first to enjoy the Pensionado Act as a student sent to the United States for education.

== Career ==
He was part of the electoral board in 1906 when Sergio Osmeña won as governor. Roa then served as councilor and then as municipal president (equivalent of mayor) of Cebu and then was appointed as member of the provincial board in 1909.

He was governor of the province of Cebu for three terms from 1912 until 1921. As a candidate for Partido Nacionalista, he was elected on July 4, 1912, and assumed the office in October 16. On the day he was sworn, a typhoon struck the province and caused parts of the city to be submerged in one to two meters of water. It also took the lives of 396 people, wrecked over 21,000 houses, ruined 96 municipal buildings, public infrastructures, and properties, and caused the loss of crops and livestock. The biggest challenge in his first year as governor was to help the province recover and address the destruction brought about by the typhoon, with total damages estimated to be between two and four million pesos, through relief and rehabilitation efforts. Additionally, he worked to improve efficiency in tax collection, health, education, public works, and law enforcement.

He would serve two more terms by being reelected governor in 1916 and again on June 3, 1919. Under his governorship, Compostela was recognized as a municipality and no longer part of Liloan and University of the Philippines opened a Junior College of Liberal Arts in Cebu on May 3, 1918. An investigation was initiated in relation to the electoral fraud of 1919. He was involved in the controversy by a telegram he sent to then Senator Celestino Rodriguez to delay the investigation until "consultation" had been done with then Congressman Osmeña. The governor general ordered the investigation to continue and in the end, Roa was only given a reprimand and asked to pay the cost of postal service in delivering the official telegram.

Upon the end of his term in 1922, he was replaced by Arsenio V. Climaco as provincial governor. In 1937, he was part of the first city council and the first presiding officer (equivalent of vice mayor) when Cebu was declared the third city of the Philippines, after Manila and Baguio. On December 29 of that same year, he was elected to the provincial board and briefly took over as governor when Buenaventura P. Rodriguez died on December 9, 1940.
