= Cebu Safari and Adventure Park =

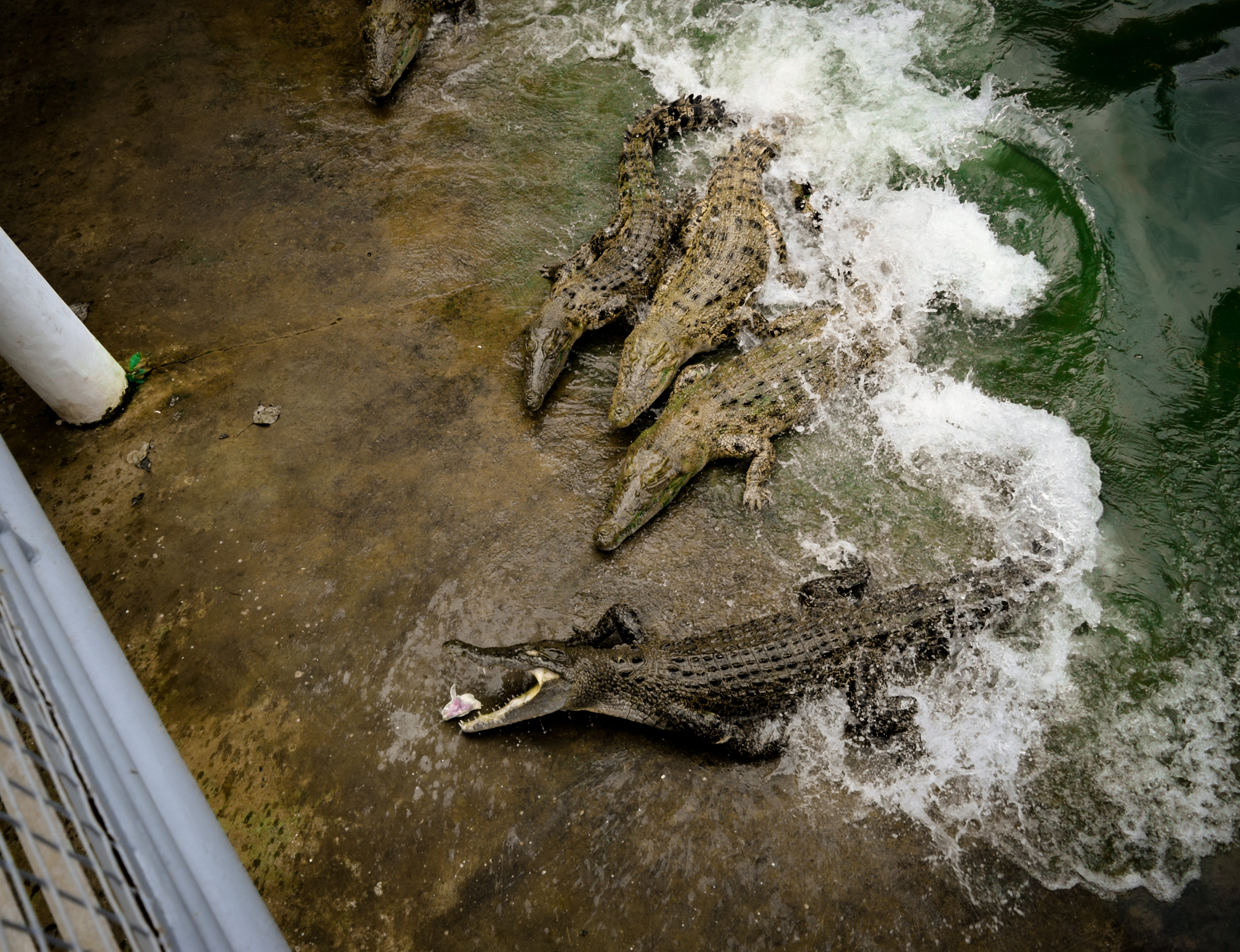
- Crocodile feeding in the Cebu Safari and Adventure Park
- Interactive map of Cebu Safari and Adventure Park
- 10°35′19″N 123°57′40″E
- Date opened: 2018
- Location: Carmen, Cebu, Philippines
- Land area: 170 hectares (420 acres)
- No. of animals: ~1,000
- No. of species: ~120
- Memberships: SEAZA
- Owner: Michel J. Lhuillier
- Management: M. Lhuillier Group of Companies
- Website: Official website

Cebu Safari and Adventure Park is an adventure and safari park located in Carmen, Cebu, Philippines founded by Michel J. Lhuillier and Eduard J. Loop and covers 170 hectares with more than a thousand animals from 120 different species. It is considered as the biggest zoological park in the Philippines.

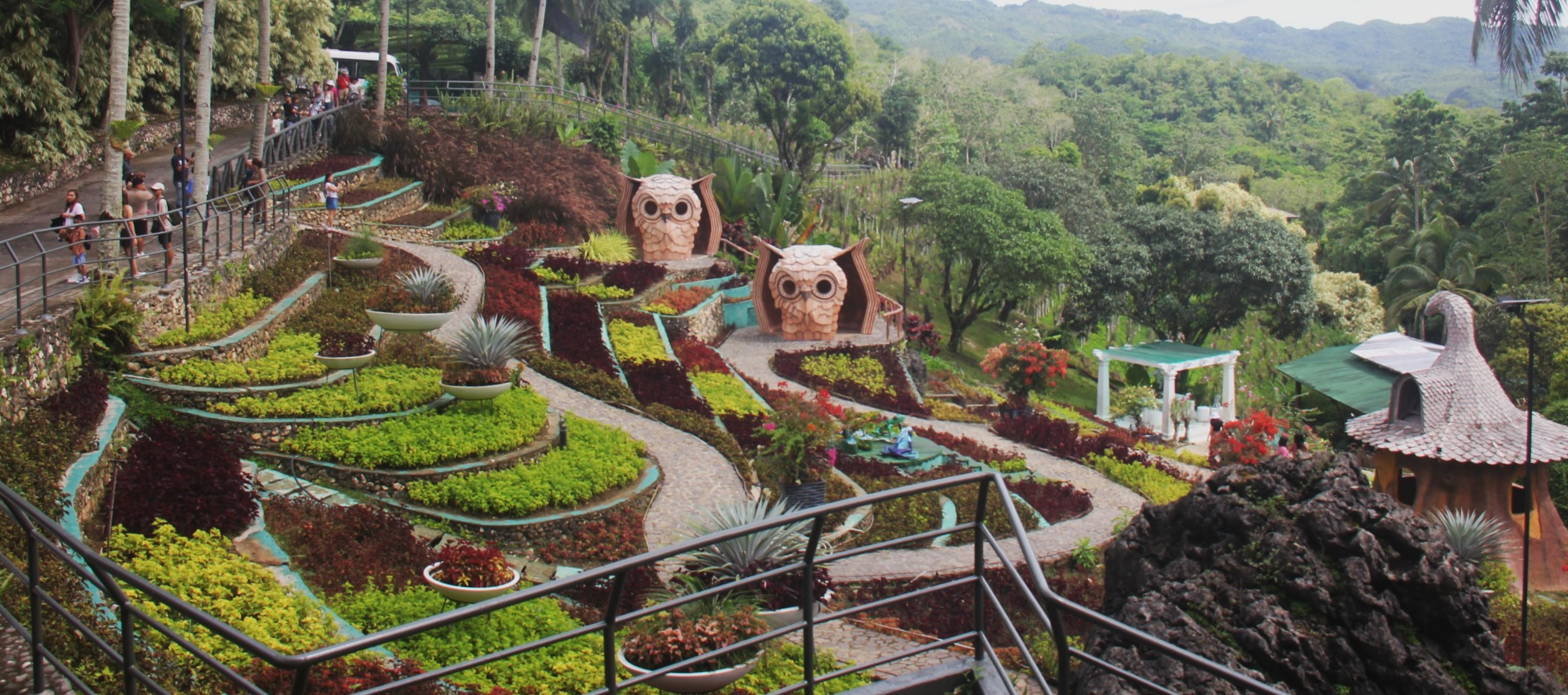
Sky view of the park with owl sculptures and flower terraces.

== Overview ==
Located in Barangay Corte, Carmen, the Cebu Safari and Adventure Park serves as a sanctuary for different species of plants & animals and features mainly the African Savanna, Michelle's Garden, Gardens of the World, and the White Lion Safari. It also has a zipline which is 1.3 kilometers long and 671 metes above sea level.

For adults and for children 3 feet (91 centimetres) and above admission tickets cost ₱900 on weekdays and ₱1,100 on weekends and holidays. For children measuring between 2 feet (61 centimetres) to 3 feet (91 centimetres), tickets cost ₱450 on weekdays and ₱550 on weekends and holidays. Children measuring below 2 feet (61 centimetres) are admitted for free.

The park is open everyday, including on holidays, from 8:00am to 5:00pm.

== Development history ==
In early 2017, photos of the adventure park being developed then surfaced on different social media sites from people who were granted an exclusive tour and some of which falsely announced that it was going to open in April 2017. This prompted Lhuillier, the owner, to clarify in a press conference that it was untrue and they were aiming October or November 2017 as their projected opening date.

The adventure park, which soft opened in February 2018, was conceptualized by Lhuillier after his visit to the San Diego Zoo in California after collecting several exotic animals and plants.

It is part of the 2,000-hectare property owned by the family of Lhuillier who is the founder and chairman of the M. Lhuillier Group of Companies which owns Michel J. Lhuillier Financial Services (Pawnshops), Inc. in the Philippines.
