= Jose Delgado (politician) =

Governor of the province of Cebu, Philippines from 1943 to 1944

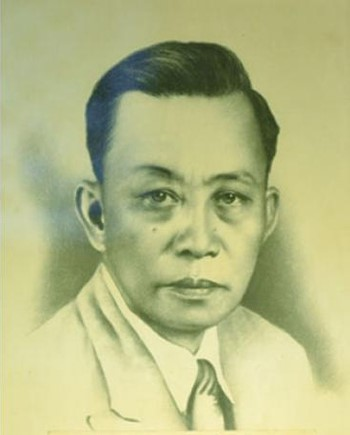

Member of the National Assembly from Cebu
- Ex officio
- In office September 25, 1943 – February 2, 1944 Serving with Jose S. Leyson

11th Governor of Cebu
- In office 1943–1944
- Preceded by: Hilario Abellana
- Succeeded by: Jose S. Leyson

Mayor of Cebu City
- In office August 3, 1940 – April 10, 1942
- Preceded by: Vicente Rama
- Succeeded by: Juan Zamora

Personal details
- Party: KALIBAPI (c. 1943)
- Profession: Lawyer

Jose Delgado was a lawyer and politician from Cebu, Philippines who became mayor of Cebu City (1940–1942) and the governor of the province of Cebu (1943–1944), becoming the first person to have held both offices.

== Background ==
Jose Delgado's parents were Marcelo Enriquez and Monica Delgado. After becoming a lawyer on October 15, 1923, he was appointed as mayor of Cebu City on August 3, 1940 upon the resignation of Vicente Rama who was running for the senatorial seat in the elections to be held on November 11, 1941. Delgado served as mayor until April 10, 1942, and he was replaced by Juan Zamora.

During World War II, he served as the governor of Cebu from 1943 until 1944, although scholars had a hard time determining the start and end of his term, as well as the terms of Hilario Abellana and Jose S. Leyson, due to the instability in politics and civilian government in those times. By virtue of the 1943 Constitution of the Republic of the Philippines, he was an ex officio member of the National Assembly under the Japanese regime during his time as governor. On February 1, 1944, he was also said to be Cebu's highest ranking official during the celebration of Japanese National Foundation Day held.

It was during his stint that Cebu City Children Hospital and Cebu City Vocational School were established. On March 9, 1944, he made an announcement calling for peace by urging people to assist the efforts of the government against the anti-Japanese guerilla forces.
