= Fructuoso Cabahug =

Filipino Visayan lawyer and politician from Mandaue, Cebu, Philippines

The Honorable Fructuoso Barte Cabahug
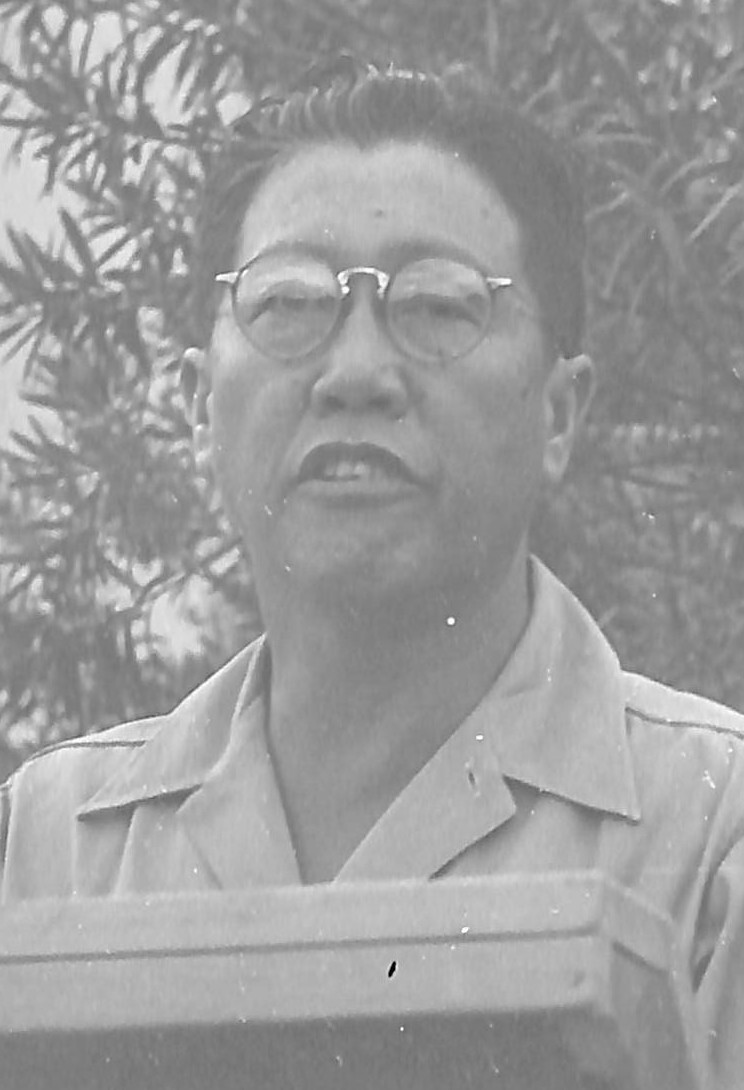
- Cabahug in 1945

13th Governor of Cebu
- In office 1945–1946
- Preceded by: Jose S. Leyson
- Succeeded by: Manuel A. Cuenco

Personal details
- Born: January 20, 1897 Mandaue, Cebu, Captaincy General of the Philippines
- Died: December 24, 1961 (aged 64)

Fructuoso "Tosong" Barte Cabahug (January 20, 1897 – December 24, 1961) was a Filipino Visayan lawyer, author, and politician from Cebu, Philippines. He was the governor of Cebu province after World War II and served from 1945 until 1946.

== Early life ==
Fructuoso Cabahug, born on January 20, 1897, was the child of Narciso Cabahug and Cirila Barte from Mandaue City and the brother of Sotero B. Cabahug, who became governor of Cebu from 1934 to 1937. His wife was Esperanza Labucay, daughter of businessman Estanislao Labucay. He was admitted to the Philippine Bar on January 24, 1925, and became a lawyer.

== Career ==
Fructuoso was an author, and the National Library of the Philippines holds a copy of the book he published in 1918 called The Beliefs and Ceremonies of the Native Doctors or Medicine Men in the Island of Cebu.

He began his political career as a municipal councilor of Mandaue, Cebu. On December 10, 1940, he was elected member of the Cebu provincial board together with Jose Leyson under the term of Governor Hilario Abellana.

After the war, Cabahug was appointed as the governor of the province of Cebu by then President Sergio Osmeña. His term started from 1945 until 1946, and his administration was tasked with the immediate concern of restoring the government in the provinces in the post-war era and sharing power with the Philippine Civil Affairs Unit. To combat shortage of food supply, he distributed seeds to the people and urged them to cultivate their own food. He encouraged cooperation with the Americans, issued an official advisory against profiteering and criminality, and requested that artesian wells that were owned privately would be open to the public.

On February 7, 1954, then President Ramon Magsaysay appointed him as provincial board member and his brother, Sotero Cabahug, as acting economic coordination administrator.

On May 18, 1959, he was appointed by then President Carlos P. Garcia as Undersecretary of Foreign Affairs to replace the late Juan Alcazaren. He took his oath before Garcia with President Osmeña and Rep. Maximino Noel of Cebu in attendance. He led the country's delegation to the Colombo Plan held in Singapore.

== Later years ==
Fructuoso died on December 24, 1961.

== Historical commemoration ==
- Mayor Carlos J. Cuizon approved the city ordinance on January 4, 1966, naming the Cebu City street that runs from Pope John Paul II Avenue until Subangdaku Creek Fructuoso Cabahug Street in his honor.
