= Arcadio Maxílom =

Filipino teacher, statesman, and revolutionary (1862–1924)

The Honorable Arcadio Maxílom
- The only known primary source photo of Maxílom as seen in the newspaper, Bag-ong Kusog (1924)

Politico-Military Governor of Cebu
- In office December 20, 1898 – October 27, 1901
- Appointed by: Katipunan
- Preceded by: Gen. Adolfo Montero (last Spanish governor)
- Succeeded by: Office abolished

2nd Supreme General of the Cebuano Katipunan (KKK)
- In office May 20, 1898 – October 27, 1901
- Appointed by: Katipunan
- Preceded by: León Kilat
- Succeeded by: Office abolished

19th Gobernadorcillo of Tuburan
- In office 1892–1895
- Appointed by: Tuburan, Cebu
- Preceded by: Augustin Allego
- Succeeded by: Office abolished

1st Capitán Municipal of Tuburan
- In office 1895–1896
- Appointed by: Maura Law
- Preceded by: Office established
- Succeeded by: Fausto Tabotabo

Personal details
- Born: November 13, 1862 Tuburan, Cebu, Captaincy General of the Philippines
- Died: August 10, 1924 (aged 61) Tuburan, Cebu, Philippine Islands
- Profession: Teacher, Statesman
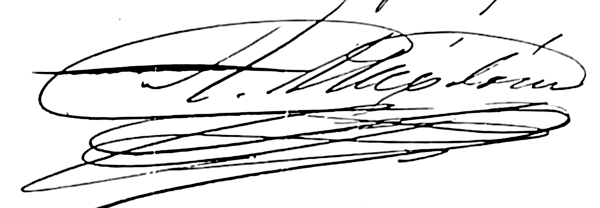
- Signature
- Nickname: Tan Cadio

Arcadio Maxílom y Molero (November 13, 1862 – August 10, 1924) was a Filipino teacher, revolutionary leader, and general who played a pivotal role in the Philippine Revolution against Spain and the subsequent Philippine–American War. He was one of the last Filipino commanders in Cebu to surrender to American forces. He briefly served as the military governor of Cebu during the transitional period following Spanish surrender.

== Early life and education ==
Arcadio Maxílom y Molero was born on November 13, 1862, in Tuburan, Cebu, to Roberto Maxílom y Delastima, a former gobernadorcillo, and Gregoria Molero y Gallarde. He had other known siblings named Enemecio Maxílom, Samuel Maxílom, and Cesario Maxílom. Both parents belonged to the principalía in colonial Philippines, with the Maxíloms and the Tabotabos standing as the most prominent landowning families in mid-19th century Tuburan. Following the death of his father, his mother Gregoria was widowed and subsequently married Diego Tabotabo, a wealthy hacendero. This union made Arcadio the stepbrother of Fausto Tabotabo, Diego's son in another family. Despite their blended family, the two often held conflicting views and harbored political differences. Maxílom received his early education through the cartilla method. He also worked closely with Father Mauricio Esmero, the longest-serving parish priest of colonial Tuburan, who became highly influential in tutoring the young Arcadio in Spanish and Latin. This foundational education prepared him for his later roles in teaching and governance.

== Marriages and family ==
Maxílom's first partner was Florentina Allego of Putat, Tuburan, though they later separated. They had a son named Emiliano Maxílom. He subsequently married Ciriaca Novicio of Sogod, Cebu some time before 1890. She was the daughter of Lope Novicio, a prominent local figure. They had three children: Conrado Maxílom, Veronica Maxílom, and Felisa Maxílom Timog. In his private life, Maxílom was known to be highly deferential to his wife, maintaining a matriarchal family dynamic where he subtly feared Ciriaca.

== Pre-revolutionary career and relocation ==
Maxílom began his professional life as an educator, teaching at the Escuela de Niños (Boys' School) in Tuburan from 1877 to 1881, where he instructed young students in basic subjects. Following this, he served as secretary of the Juzgado de Paz (Court of Peace) in Tuburan from 1882 to 1888, gaining administrative experience in local colonial governance.

His involvement in civic affairs deepened when he was elected as teniente segundo (second lieutenant) in 1888 and later as the 19th and last gobernadorcillo of Tuburan from 1892 to 1895. It was during 1895 that the Maura Law was put into effect and he became the first capitán municipal of the town up until 1896. During this period, Maxílom managed local affairs under Spanish rule, building a reputation for fairness and leadership that would later translate into his revolutionary roles.

As the Tabotabo family began to consolidate their control over the local politics of Tuburan, tensions escalated. The situation was further exacerbated when his stepbrother Fausto slandered him, accusing Maxílom of being a terrorist sympathetic to the Manila-based Katipunan when the town was still very much under the Spaniards. Consequently, Maxílom and his family decided to leave Tuburan and temporarily relocated to San Nicolas in Cebu City.

It was in San Nicolas and the broader city that he met and interacted with the influential figures who would later lead the Cebu Uprising, including León Kilat, Luis Flores, Candido Padilla, and Juan Climaco. His anti-colonial sentiments had already been galvanized by his observations of the Spanish Guardia Civil's occupation of Tuburan, where he witnessed rampant tyranny and severe abuses by the authorities, including the molestation of local women.

== Revolution against Spain ==
Maxílom joined the Cebu chapter of the Katipunan, a secret society dedicated to Philippine independence, around 1896 to 1898. As the revolution intensified, he became a key military figure. Following the Battle of Tres de Abril on April 3, 1898, where revolutionary forces under León Kilat clashed with Spanish troops in Cebu City, Maxílom learned of Kilat's betrayal and assassination.

On April 8, 1898 (Good Friday), Kilat was betrayed while resting at the home of Timoteo Barcenilla in Carcar. Conspirators, including Capitán Florencio Noel and Apolinario Alcuitas, attacked him in his sleep, stabbing him, smashing his skull with his own rifle, and mutilating his body in the town plaza while shouting "¡Viva España!" to demonstrate loyalty to Spain. This event, rooted in fears among local elites of the revolution's chaos, is debated in historical accounts, with Alcuitas viewed alternately as a hero or villain.

=== Battle of Tuburan ===
Undeterred, Maxílom led revolutionary forces and arrived in Tuburan on April 15, 1898, capturing the town from Spanish control. Maxílom put aside his long-standing differences with Fausto Tabotabo, who was then serving as the town's second capitán municipal, succeeding him. It was a pragmatic, necessary alliance for defense and coordination. Together, they rallied the townspeople in the plaza and anticipated the bombardment of the Spanish ships, Don Juan de Austria and Paragua, from the shores, carrying Spanish troops and Spanish-loyalist Filipinos. The ensuing battle was a fierce engagement that lasted for eight hours, beginning at 5:30 AM and concluding at 1:00 PM. 45 Cebuano revolutionaries were killed on that day, including some of Maxílom's relatives. On the other side, 80 loyalist soldiers and 3 officers died. During the conflict and the subsequent Great Fire that swept through the town, leaving only the San Antonio de Padua Church and the long-lost convent, Maxílom managed to save Fausto's family house (which also served as the municipal building) and camarín from the flames. This act of preservation earned him newfound respect from Fausto, mending much of the past bitterness between the stepbrothers.

After a brief retreat to the Anijao mountains (which are now locally called Baterya after serving as one of the many camps Maxílom retreated to during the later war with the Americans), he regrouped in the central highlands of Sudlon on May 20, 1898, under the leadership of Luis Flores. Maxílom established Sudlon as a fortified Katipunan stronghold, earning the title of Supreme General and coordinating with allies like Jacinto Pacana and Francisco Llamas to launch offensives and repel Spanish advances. This base proved impenetrable, allowing the revolutionaries to sustain their campaign.

His family played a significant role: brothers Enemecio, Samuel, and Cesario served as officers in the Katipunan, with Enemecio commanding Tuburan after its capture. During his absences, Maxílom entrusted his hacienda to his wife Ciriaca and father-in-law Lope Novicio.

=== Battle of Budla-an ===
The Spanish forces, still determined to crush the rebellion once and for all, pursued Maxílom and the Katipunan through the mountains and were eventually spotted near the Budla-an Falls in what is now Barangay Budla-an, Talamban, Cebu City. A revolutionary scout quickly alerted everyone through a conch shell signal. This allowed them to prepare defenses.

Approximately 200 Cebuano irregulars, armed primarily with bolo knives, defended their hilltop position against about 100 Spanish soldiers led by Capitán Garcia. Maxílom coordinated the overall strategy, while Generals Alejo Miñoza and Lorenzo Eje directly commanded the forces on the ground. The rebels divided into two groups: one under Eje on the hill and another under Miñoza at the base. The Spanish split their troops, sending cavalry to assault Miñoza's position. As the Spanish advanced into the forests, the Cebuano warriors surrounded them and engaged in close-quarters melee combat, using their bladed weapons effectively. The battle resulted in heavy Spanish casualties, around 70 dead, while the Filipinos suffered only 6 dead and 10 wounded. The Spanish forces retreated in disorder.

=== Takeover of El Pardo ===
By December 1898, the Katipunan, with Maxílom and Flores, arrived in Cebu City and captured El Pardo (now Basak Pardo) and demanded the surrender of Spanish forces in Cebu City on December 16. The Spaniards, aware of the impending evacuation, offered little resistance and withdrew without a major battle. The revolutionaries established a provisional revolutionary government at El Pardo, with Maxílom as its military head. That same day, Maxílom sent a formal letter to Spanish authorities in Cebu City, demanding their peaceful surrender to avoid bloodshed. The Spaniards requested two to three days to depart and complied, leaving Cebu on December 24 aboard gunboats. This officially marks the end of centuries-long Spanish rule in Cebu.

== Governorship of Cebu ==
On December 20, 1898, following the collapse of Spanish rule in the province, Luis Flores—who served as the president of the representatives in Cebu for the Katipunan—along with other revolutionary generals, officially elected Maxílom as the politico-military governor of Cebu. He effectively replaced General Adolfo Montero, the departing Spanish politico-military governor, amid the power vacuum following Spanish surrender. By December 29, the revolutionaries formally took over Cebu City, raising a makeshift Philippine flag at Fort San Pedro during day-long festivities. This appointment was contested by Julio A. Llorente, who was selected by Cebu City townspeople in a separate civilian process. The debate centered on legitimacy: Maxílom's role was revolutionary and military-driven, focused on maintaining Katipunan control during hostilities, while Llorente's emphasized stability among elites. Some historians recognize Maxílom as the "first Cebuano governor" due to his revolutionary credentials. Unbeknownst to them, the Treaty of Paris was also signed that month, wherein Spain ceased its more than 300-year sovereignty over the Philippines to the United States for twenty million dollars. Factional tensions among the Cebuano leaders persisted until the arrival of American forces such as the 19th U.S. Infantry in February 21, 1899 aboard the USS Petrel.

== Philippine–American War ==
With the outbreak of the Philippine–American War in February 1899, Maxílom refused to recognize American sovereignty and continued guerrilla warfare from the central mountains.

=== Battle of Sudlon ===
Facing a new foreign power, Maxílom and his forces retreated to the Sudlon stronghold for an impending siege. Led by Major Andrew S. Rowan, the Americans arrived by late 1899, and begun intensive operations to cripple the stronghold. By January 8, 1900, American troops launch a major three-pronged assault on the Sudlon heights. Despite fierce resistance at the nearby Bitlang Pass, U.S. forces successfully scale the cliffs and capture the revolutionary headquarters.

Following the fall of the mountain base, Maxílom and the Katipunan continued scorched earth tactics for as long as they could and eventually headed westward of Cebu and by early 1901, they continue to ambush American forces in Balamban.

== Surrender ==
Maxílom is best remembered for stubbornly refusing to surrender to the American forces even as his fellow revolutionaries in Manila and Cebu were starting to capitulate or collaborate with the new invaders and was the last Cebuano general to accept defeat. He surrendered on October 27, 1901 to Lt. John L. Bond and his infantry in Tuburan. With him are 78 of his men who turned over a total of 29 rifles, 4 cannons, 1 pistol, and about 40 bolo knives. The surrender of Maxílom marked the end of Cebuano resistance to American forces. On March 18, 1902, five months after his surrender, General Maxílom was arrested by an American constabulary officer named Lt. McCarthy in his own hometown. He was accused of hiding found guerilla equipment in the nearby mountains by the Americans. Also arrested in alleged conspiracy are his brothers Enemecio and Samuel, whom both were reportedly shot to death while in prison.

== Later years ==
The general was released some time in 1903 and spent his remaining days on his hometown, retiring from public life. While his fellow contemporaries would find some semblance of political leverage during the early American occupation, Maxílom gradually faded away into the background.

=== The curious "carabao lawsuits" ===
When Maxílom was campaigning in Cebu City, the American-installed municipal president of Tuburan, Bonifacio Alburo, conspiring with Felix Estrella and several others with the help of Lt. McCarthy and American constables by means of force and intimidation, took the carabaos from the hacienda of the general, while both his wife and the latter's father were defenseless against the perpetrators.

Upon returning home after imprisonment in 1902, he filed a case of conspiracy against the ones responsible for taking his carabaos. Maxílom won in the lower court, with defendants Demetrio Ouano, Felix Estrella, Severino Mercado, and Julio Villarin were ordered to pay ₱775 for the value of the carabaos.

The defendants then later appealed their cases and were represented by Boholano lawyer José A. Clarín to the Supreme Court, while Maxílom was represented by an American lawyer named Martin M. Levering. The majority of the members of the Court during this time were Americans and decided the case en banc, reversing the decision of the lower court and acquitted all of the defendants of conspiracy, thus the general lost the case. The decision was made on December 4, 1908 and written by Associate Justice Willard.

The Court dismissed the testimony of witness Basilio Piala for Maxílom that he saw the general's carabaos in possession of Ouano. The Court also declared the testimonies of Felix Abaquita and Julio Villarin against the defendants as hearsay and were not given credence.

=== The Tabotabo estate dispute ===
In addition to the carabao lawsuits, Maxílom was involved in another notable civil case against Gaudencio Tabotabo, the executor of the estate of his stepfather Diego Tabotabo. This dispute, G.R. No. L-3505, decided by the Philippine Supreme Court on December 20, 1907, revolved around a claim of indebtedness against the estate stemming from an unsettled account dated March 18, 1899, between Maxílom and his already-deceased stepbrother Fausto Tabotabo, amounting to 1,062.37 pesos in Mexican currency.

Maxílom presented evidence of the debt, which was initially allowed by estate commissioners and affirmed by the Court of First Instance of Cebu. However, on appeal, the Supreme Court, in a decision penned by Justice Willard, reversed the ruling and remanded for a new trial. The key issue was the inadmissibility of Maxílom's own testimony under Section 383, Paragraph 7 of the Code of Procedure in Civil Actions, which prohibited parties from testifying about facts predating the deceased's death in claims against estates to prevent potential fraud. The Court dismissed arguments on prescription as not raised below but ordered a retrial, allowing Maxílom to prove his claim through other evidence.

== Death ==
General Maxílom died in his hometown of Tuburan on August 10, 1924, after a long battle with paralysis. Although he had largely retired from public life, his passing was marked by a massive funeral in Cebu City after a month-long lying in repose in Tuburan, an event that cemented both his enduring national legacy and the intense partisan rivalries of the American colonial era.

The funeral procession drew an immense crowd. Attendees gathered early at the Cebu pier to welcome prominent revolutionary leaders who traveled to pay their respects, most notably General Emilio Aguinaldo, who arrived aboard the ship Nuestra Señora de Alba alongside other veterans from Luzon. Local dignitaries, including Governor Arsenio Climaco and Representative Nicolas Rafols, were also in attendance. The procession began at the Maxílom family's city residence on Tupas Street in San Nicolas and stretched for over a kilometer to the local cemetery. In a notable gesture of respect from his former adversaries, the Casino Español on Colon Street lowered the Spanish flag to half-mast as the cortège passed.

During the services, speeches were delivered in Spanish, Cebuano, and Tagalog. Aguinaldo gave a eulogy praising Maxílom's life as a profound lesson in patriotism for the youth, noting that his death was mourned by revolutionaries across the Philippines. However, the event was heavily steeped in the political tensions of the time. Maxílom was a member of the opposition Democrata Party, and his grand honors drew resentment from members of the ruling Nacionalista Party, some of whom had unsuccessfully attempted to prevent the funeral from taking place in the city. In his speech, Aguinaldo pointedly criticized the government, noting that while the state dispatched high-ranking officials to mourn deceased members of the political elite, only veterans came to honor the Cebuano general. Today, Maxílom's funeral cortège is remembered as one of the longest and most attended in Cebu's history.

== Legacy ==
Mango Avenue, one of the main thoroughfares in Cebu City, was renamed General Maxílom Avenue in honor of the general. In 2019, the Cebu Provincial Police Office in Sudlon, Lahug was renamed Camp General Arcadio Maxílom with the unveiling ceremony attended by a few of his descendants. A bust of him was also erected there.

== Sources ==
- Bersales, Joeber (4 October 2007). "Where is Gen. Arcadio Maxilom?". Philippine Daily Inquirer. Archived from the original on September 19, 2008.
- Bersales, Jobers (24 July 2008). "Finding Maxilom's cannon". Philippine Daily Inquirer. Archived from the original on October 4, 2008.
- Foreman, John (1906) [2011]. The Philippine Islands: A Political, Geographical, Ethnographical, Social And Commercial History Of The Philippine Archipelago, Embracing The Whole ... The Succeeding American Insular Government... (3rd ed.). Fisher Unwin. ISBN 978-1173730451.
- Justimbaste, Emil (1 June 1998). "Recruitment and Beginnings". The Freeman. León Kilat and Cebu's Revolution. Archived from the original on October 27, 2009.
- Wani, Rhoda (7 November 2005). "The Lives of Luis Flores, Julio Llorente, Juan Climaco and Arcadio Maxilom: Collaboration and Resistance in Cebu, 1898–1902". Archived from the original on 2012-02-16.
