= Cebu's at-large congressional district =

Legislative district of the Philippines

Cebu's at-large congressional district was the provincewide electoral district used to elect members of Philippine national legislatures in Cebu before 1987.

Cebu first elected its representatives at-large during the 1943 Philippine legislative election for a seat in the National Assembly of the Second Philippine Republic, with an additional seat allocated for its provincial governor and a separate district created for its capital Cebu City being a chartered city since 1937. Before 1943, the province including its capital city was represented in the national legislatures through its first, second, third, fourth, fifth, sixth and seventh districts. The province was also earlier represented in the Malolos Congress of the First Philippine Republic in 1898 by appointed delegates from Luzon.

The seven districts were restored in Cebu ahead of the 1941 Philippine House of Representatives elections whose elected representatives only began to serve following the dissolution of the Second Republic and the restoration of the Philippine Commonwealth in 1945. An at-large district would not be used in the province again until the 1984 Philippine parliamentary election for two seats in the Batasang Pambansa and another two seats for Cebu City's assembly district as a highly urbanized city entitled to its own representation. It became obsolete following the 1987 reapportionment under a new constitution that restored Cebu's first six congressional districts, eliminated the seventh district, and created two districts for Cebu City.

== Representation history ==
#	Term of office		National Assembly	Seat A				Seat B				Seat C				Seat D											
#	Start	End	National Assembly	Image	Member	Party	Electoral history	Image	Member	Party	Electoral history	Image	Member	Party	Electoral history	Image	Member	Party	Electoral history								
=== Cebu's at-large district for the Malolos Congress ===
District created June 18, 1898.
–	September 15, 1898	March 23, 1901	1st		Ariston Bautista	Nonpartisan	Appointed.		Félix David	Nonpartisan	Appointed.		Francisco Macabulos	Nonpartisan	Appointed.		Trinidad Pardo de Tavera	Nonpartisan	Appointed.								
#	Term of office		National Assembly	Seat A				Seat B																			
#	Start	End	National Assembly	Image	Member	Party	Electoral history	Image	Member	Party	Electoral history																
=== Cebu's at-large district for the National Assembly (Second Philippine Republic) ===
District re-created September 7, 1943.
–	September 25, 1943	February 2, 1944	1st		José Leyson	KALIBAPI	Elected in 1943.		José Delgado	KALIBAPI	Appointed as an ex officio member.																
District dissolved into Cebu's 1st, 2nd, 3rd, 4th, 5th, 6th and 7th districts.
#	Term of office		Batasang Pambansa	Seat A				Seat B				Seat C				Seat D				Seat E				Seat F			
#	Start	End	Batasang Pambansa	Image	Member	Party	Electoral history	Image	Member	Party	Electoral history	Image	Member	Party	Electoral history	Image	Member	Party	Electoral history	Image	Member	Party	Electoral history	Image	Member	Party	Electoral history
=== Cebu's at-large district for the Regular Batasang Pambansa ===
District re-created February 1, 1984.
–	July 23, 1984	March 25, 1986	2nd		Emerito S. Calderon	KBL	Elected in 1984.		Nenita Cortes Daluz	UNIDO	Elected in 1984.		Ramon Durano III	KBL	Elected in 1984.		Regalado Maambong	KBL	Elected in 1984.		Luisito R. Patalinjug	KBL	Elected in 1984.		Adelino B. Sitoy	KBL	Elected in 1984.
District dissolved into Cebu's 1st, 2nd, 3rd, 4th, 5th and 6th districts.

== See also ==
- Legislative districts of Cebu
