= Hilario Abellana =

Filipino Visayan politician, legislator, and war-time governor of Cebu, Philippines

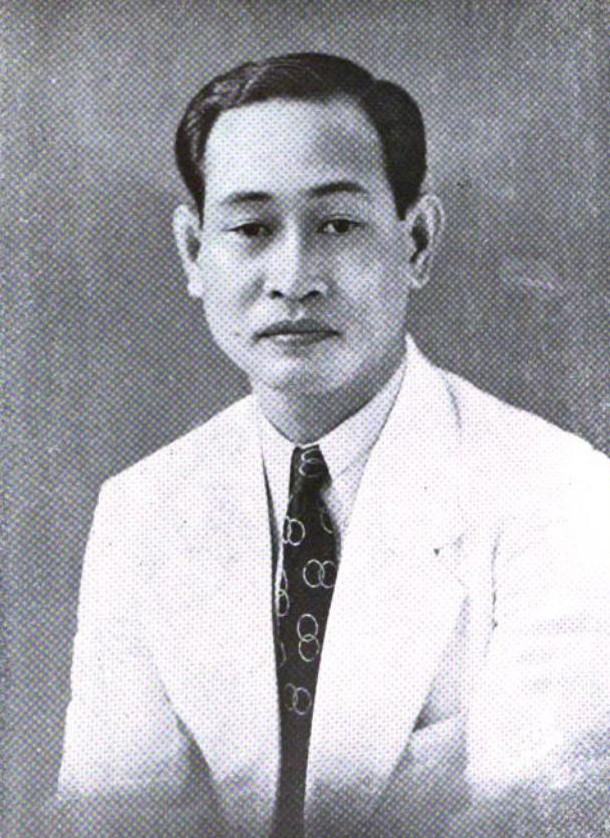
- Photograph from The Commercial & Industrial Manual of the Philippines, 1941

Member of the House of the Representatives for Cebu's 2nd District Member of the National Assembly (1935–1941)
- In office June 5, 1934 – December 30, 1941
- Preceded by: Sotero Cabahug
- Succeeded by: District dissolved (next held by Pedro Lopez)

10th Governor of Cebu
- In office 1941–1943
- Preceded by: Buenaventura P. Rodriguez
- Succeeded by: Jose Delgado

Municipal President of Cebu
- In office 1922–1931
- Vice President: Julian Alcantara (1922–1925); Alberto Mansueto (1925–1928); Regino Mercado (1928–1931)
- Preceded by: Fructuoso Ramos
- Succeeded by: Fructuoso Ramos

Personal details
- Born: HIlario Abellana y Hermosa; October 23, 1896 Cebu, Cebu, Captaincy General of the Philippines
- Died: January 15, 1945 (aged 48) Cebu City, Cebu, Second Philippine Republic
- Party: Nacionalista (1934–1945); Democrata (1922–1934)
- Spouse: Encarnación Lozano
- Profession: Lawyer

Hilario "Dodong" Abellana y Hermosa (October 23, 1896 – January 15, 1945) was a Filipino Visayan lawyer, politician and legislator from Cebu, Philippines. He was the municipal president of Cebu (1922–1931), a member of the House of Representatives (1934–1935), a two-term member of the National Assembly (1935–1941), and provincial governor of Cebu during World War II (1941–1943). After his escape and eventual captivity, he was executed by the Japanese Imperial Army and the resting place of his remains is still unknown.

== Early life ==
Hilario Abellana was born in Barrio Duljo, San Nicolas, Cebu on October 23, 1896. The only son of Andres Abellana, he passed the bar exams and became a lawyer in 1920.

== Political career ==
Abellana entered local politics in 1922 where he ran for municipal president (presently, the equivalent of mayor) of Cebu under Democrata Party after Paulino Gullas, founder of Visayan Institute (now University of Visayas) declined the party's nomination. Abellana defeated the Nacionalista Party's candidate, the four-term Fructuoso Ramos who had been in the position for a decade. He was later replaced by Alberto Mansueto.

During the 1934 national elections, politicians in Cebu were part of the Democrata, and they were split into Anti and Pro factions, signifying their stance with respect to approving the Hare, Hawes and Cutting Law and the Tydings-McDuffie Law of the United States. Abellana of the Pro side defeated Anti's Tomas Alfonso and won as member of the House of Representatives representing Cebu's 2nd legislative district. Upon the ratification of the 1935 Philippine Constitution and the shift towards unicameral Congress, Abellana was elected as member of the First National Assembly and the Second National Assembly of the Philippine Commonwealth from 1935 until 1941.

On December 9, 1940, then incumbent Governor Buenaventura Rodriguez, who was seeking for a reelection for a second term, died from a heart attack. It was the day before the election and Abellana, who was the campaign manager, was chosen as substitute candidate. He only had hours to launch and conduct his campaign, but he still won the election by defeating Mariano Mercado.

== Japanese occupation ==
On April 10, 1942, as the Japanese forces landed in Cebu, Abellana escaped to the town of Badian and in his absence, Jose Leyson became the de facto governor of Cebu. On June 12, 1942, he returned to the city and resumed his post as governor with Leyson as vice governor. He urged government officers and employees to report back to work on June 30, 1942 or they would be considered enemies of the Japanese and executed. He chose to remain in office, hoping that by staying close to and feigning collaboration with the Japanese forces he could provide aid to the Cebuano guerillas.

=== Escape ===
In running the civilian provincial government, he maintained ties with the resistance movement, and his position proved to be untenable in the time of intimidation, fear, and executions. He was gradually stripped of responsibilities and realized he was utilized by the Japanese for propaganda. Under surveillance day and night, he made his escape on January 16, 1943 using the procession of Santo Niño, the culminating activity of the yearly Sinulog festivities which was attended by thousands of devotees and when street traffic in Cebu City was closed, as distraction.

=== Manhunt ===
A manhunt was launched when he failed to report to his office the following Monday. His family fled to Bohol while he traveled to the guerilla base in Tabunan, a mountainous barangay in Central Cebu. When the Japanese launched an offensive on Tabunan, he escaped to Inabanga, Bohol with his family. Later, he met United States Colonel Wendell Fertig who was helping the guerilla army in Mindanao and acquired arms and ammunition. Hilario traveled back to Bohol, eventually sailed to Cordova, and was back in Tabunan base in July 1944.

His political allies, relatives, and friends were captured, questioned, tortured and summarily executed. Jovito Abellana, his cousin and the only member of the family living in Cebu at that time, was arrested on July 13, 1944 and detained at the Cebu Normal School (now Cebu Normal University), the headquarters of the Japanese military police arm, Kempetai.

=== Captivity ===
On September 3, 1944, he was captured by the Japanese in a hideout in Cabadiangan, Compostela. He was incarcerated at the Kempetai headquarters in Cebu Normal School. Later, he was forced to make an appearance in the marketplace in Barangay Pardo under heavy guard to tell people to cooperate with the Japanese forces. Instead, he encouraged the people to continue resisting the enemies, at which point he was sent straight away to prison.

While his cousin Jovito was released a day before, Hilario Abellana was executed at the University of the Philippines Cebu campus on January 15, 1945. His body, which was reportedly buried in a waterway near University of the Philippines Junior College, was never found despite the exhaustive search of the family and the local government through Cebu Governor Fructuoso Cabahug, who sought help from the United States Army and the national government. By June 20, 1948, Republic Act No. 334 was enacted offering reward to anyone who could find the final resting place of his remains.

== Historical commemoration ==
- On June 22, 1957, Cebu City High School, formerly known as Cebu Provincial High School, was named Abellana Vocational School in his honor and then Abellana High School on June 7, 1961.
