= Dionisio Jakosalem =

Filipino politician (1878–1931)

The Honorable Dionisio Abella Jakosalem
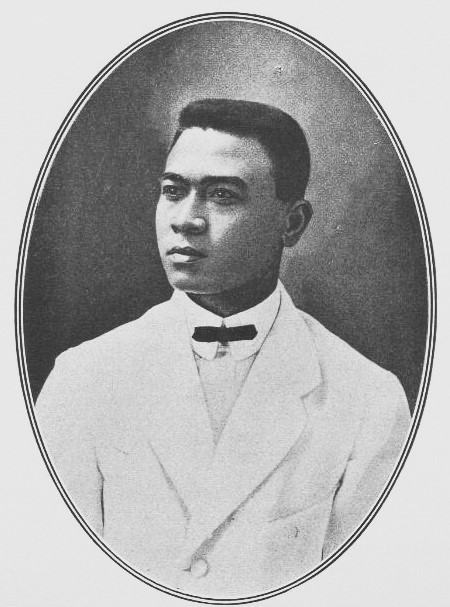

Secretary of Commerce and Communication of the Philippine Islands
- In office January 18, 1917 – October 31, 1922
- Appointed by: Francis Burton Harrison
- Preceded by: Eugene E. Reed (as Secretary of Commerce and Police)
- Succeeded by: Miguel Unson (acting); Salvador Laguda

4th Governor of Cebu
- In office October 16, 1907 – 1912
- Preceded by: Sergio Osmeña Sr.
- Succeeded by: Manuel A. Roa

Member of the Cebu Provincial Board
- In office 1913–1914

Personal details
- Born: May 8, 1878 Dumanjug, Cebu, Captaincy General of the Philippines
- Died: July 1, 1931 (aged 53) Cebu, Cebu, Philippine Islands
- Party: Nacionalista
- Education: Colegio-Seminario de San Carlos; University of Santo Tomas
- Occupation: Lawyer, writer

Dionisio Abella Jakosalem (May 8, 1878 – July 1, 1931) was the governor of Cebu, Philippines (1906–1912) and the first Filipino cabinet member appointed under the American regime.

== Early life and education ==
Jakosalem was the son of Alfonso Jakosalem and Apolonia Abella and born in Dumanjug, Cebu on May 8, 1878. He studied in Dumanjug, Colegio-Seminario de San Carlos where he met Sergio Osmeña Sr., and University of Santo Tomas where he acquired his bachelor's and law degrees. On March 27, 1907, he passed the bar exams. He married Generosa Teves.

== Politics ==
Jakosalem worked as secretary of the municipality of Dumanjug in 1900 and was appointed as justice of the peace in Cebu in 1903. The following year, he served as municipal council member. He ran a successful campaign and voted as a member of the Cebu Provincial Board in 1906. When then governor Sergio Osmeña Sr. vacated the position for his electoral campaign in the Philippine Assembly, Jakosalem became the governor of Cebu until the end of Osmeña's original term. The following year, he filed for candidacy as governor of Cebu under the Nacionalista Party and won. He was reelected in 1909 and served as the president of provincial governors' federation the next year. Under his term, he initiated infrastructure projects that built public thoroughfares connecting southern and northern towns of Cebu, a water-work system, and the Philippine Railway Company's system that was operational during the Japanese occupation.

== Civil service ==
He did not seek reelection in 1912, stating that he had grown tired of politics and wished to retire. He served as the provincial fiscal the next year and remained in this post for a year. He was offered to be appointed as governor of Davao and Director of Lands, but he declined. Governor General Francis B. Harrison, who was the country's chief executive during the American occupation, appointed him as the country's Secretary of Commerce and Communication on January 18, 1917, becoming the first Filipino to be appointed to the cabinet during the American regime. He served in this capacity until October 3, 1922.

He was also a member of the Philippine delegation to the United States of America headed by Manuel L. Quezon to campaign for the country's independence in 1919. The mission included Maximo Kalaw as private secretary, cabinet member Rafael Palma, and senator Vicente Signson Encarnacion.

As a cabinet member, he supported a law covering labor practices in the country such as setting a standard schedule for working hours of employees, creating a government body to oversee labor disputes, and regulating workers strikes. He was credited for the management on the supply of rice that avoided a national crisis caused by World War I. Additionally, he endorsed the creation of programs for road construction, a national water policy, and insurance policy that would cover employees' illness, accident, and old age.

His approach to economic policy limited the introduction of foreign capital investment insofar as it serviced national interest. In 1918, he sent bureau director James Rafferty on a mission to establish Philippine commercial agencies in the United States that would provide reports on US market conditions, aiding Philippine entrepreneurs in establishing trade relations with American counterparts, and delivering reliable information about the country to American businessmen, investors, and tourists.

== Later years ==
Jakosalem practiced law in Cebu after retiring from civil service in 1922 despite the invitation of Governor General Leonard Wood for him to continue serving in the cabinet. He also worked for Hospicio de San Jose de Barili that was founded by Pedro Cui (uncle of his wife Generosa) and became a staff of the faculty and later College of Law dean of the Visayan Institute (now University of the Visayas). He was 53 years old when he died on July 1, 1931.

== Historical commemoration ==
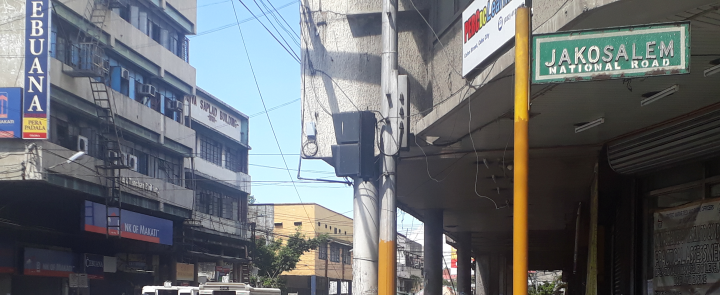
Street sign of Dionisio Jakosalem National Road

- The Dionisio Jakosalem Street in Cebu was named after him. It starts from M. C. Briones Street (named after Supreme Court associate justice Marcelo Cabahug Briones) and ends at General Maxilom Avenue (named after General Arcadio Maxilom, a hero of the Philippine Revolution).
- The Dionisio Jakosalem Heritage Park in Dumanjug, Cebu is named after him.
