= Francisco Remotigue =

Filipino Visayan lawyer and politician

The Honorable Francisco "Kikoy" Remotigue
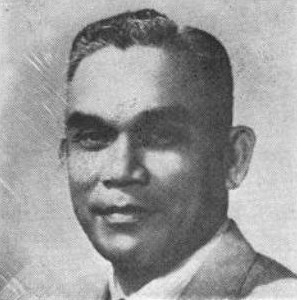

13th Secretary of Social Welfare
- In office 1966–1967
- President: Ferdinand Marcos
- Preceded by: Jose O. Pelayo
- Succeeded by: Gregorio Feliciano

17th Governor of Cebu
- In office 1961–1963
- Vice Governor: Vacant
- Preceded by: Jose Briones
- Succeeded by: Rene Espina

3rd Vice Governor of Cebu
- In office 1959–1961
- Governor: Jose Briones
- Preceded by: Office established
- Succeeded by: Priscillano Almendras

Member of the Cebu Provincial Board
- In office 1956–1959

Personal details
- Born: July 14, 1908 Argao, Cebu
- Died: April 29, 1995 (aged 86)
- Party: Nacionalista Party
- Education: Colegio de San Carlos; Manila Law School
- Profession: Lawyer

Francisco Emilio "Kikoy" Famor Remotigue (July 14, 1908 – April 29, 1995) was a Filipino Visayan lawyer and politician from Cebu, Philippines. He was member of (1956–1959), the first Vice Governor of Cebu (1959–1961), Governor (1961–1963), and Secretary of Social Welfare (1966–1967).

== Early life ==
Francisco F. Remotigue was born to parents Quintino Gerosaga Remotigue and Segundina Famor in Argao, Cebu on July 14, 1908. He attended Colegio de San Carlos (now University of San Carlos), acquired a law degree at the Manila Law School, and admitted to the Philippine Bar on November 18, 1935.

== Career ==
His career started as a clerk in the treasurer's office in Manila from 1932 to 1933. Upon coming back to Cebu, he was voted as councilor in the municipality of Ronda in 1935. He was a guerrilla leader during the Japanese occupation with a rank of Major in resistance during World War II.

Later, Remotigue became a member of the provincial board in 1956, reelected again in 1957, and served until in office until 1959. Belonging to the Nacionalista Party, he was elected and served as Vice Governor from 1959 until 1961, becoming the first Vice Governor of Cebu when the office was created. Then, he was voted to office and became Governor from 1961 until 1963. He initiated beautification and tree-planting projects. It was during his governorship that the provincial government donated the lot where the University of the Philippines Cebu stands and to the Boy Scout of the Philippines in Kalunasan, Cebu City.

In his reelection bid as governor, he lost to Rene Espina in 1964. By 1965, he was also defeated by Jose L. Briones in the election as representative for Cebu's 2nd district.

During the term of Ferdinand Marcos, he was appointed and worked as Secretary of Social Welfare from 1966 until 1967. He ran for the seat of Cebu City Mayor in 1967, but he lost to Sergio Osmeña Jr.

He died on April 29, 1995.
