= Jose Briones =

Filipino Visayan lawyer and politician

The Honorable Jose Lorenzo Briones
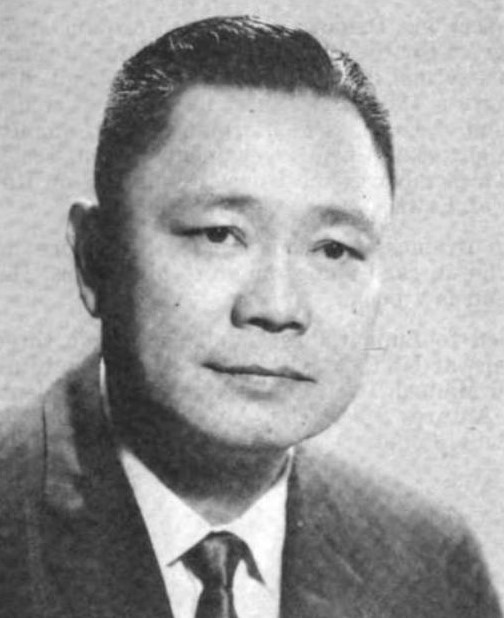

Member of the House of Representatives from Cebu's 2nd district
- In office December 30, 1961 – December 30, 1969
- Preceded by: Sergio Osmeña Jr.
- Succeeded by: John Henry Osmeña

16th Governor of Cebu
- In office December 30, 1955 – December 30, 1961
- Vice Governor: None (1955–1959); Francisco Remotigue (1959–1961)
- Preceded by: Sergio Osmeña Jr.
- Succeeded by: Francisco Remotigue

Member of the Cebu City Council
- In office December 30, 1947 – December 30, 1951

Personal details
- Born: February 10, 1916 Manila, Philippine Islands
- Died: Unknown
- Party: Liberal
- Parent(s): Manuel Briones; Celestina Lorenzo
- Education: Ateneo de Manila (LL.B)
- Occupation: Politician
- Profession: Lawyer

Jose Lorenzo Briones (February 10, 1916 – unknown) was a Filipino Visayan politician and lawyer. He served as Governor of the province of Cebu (1955–1961) and member of the House of Representatives for the 2nd District of Cebu (1961–1969).

== Early life ==
Jose Briones was the son of Manuel C. Briones and Celestina Lorenzo. He attended Zapatera Elementary School and graduated top of his class, and he studied at the Cebu Provincial High School. He finished law at the Ateneo de Manila and became a lawyer on March 13, 1946. He was married to Luna Cabrera.

== Career ==
His career started as his father's private secretary. In 1947, during the first post-war elections, he was elected member of the Cebu City Council together with Eulogio Borres, and Carlos Cuizon, and he served until 1951. On November 8, 1955, he was elected Governor of Cebu and formally assumed the role on December 30, 1955, succeeding Sergio V. Osmeña Jr. He was reelected and won over Ramon Durano on November 10, 1959.

Briones was later elected to represent Cebu's 2nd District in the House of Representatives of the Philippines. He served from December 30, 1961, to December 30, 1969, before retiring that same year.

== Historical commemoration ==
- The Jose L. Briones Street is named in his honor by virtue of City Ordinance No. 1825 approved by on April 13, 2000.
