= Julio A. Llorente =

First governor of Cebu, Philippines

The Honorable Julio Llorente y Aballe
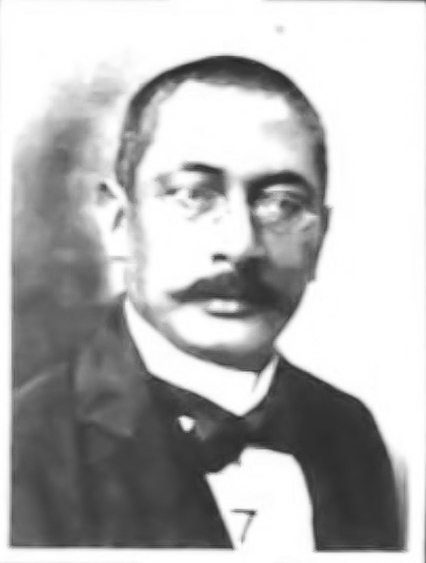
- Portrait as governor of Samar, published c. 1905, by the United States Bureau of the Census

1st Governor of Samar
- In office 1902–1903
- Appointed by: Philippine Commission
- Preceded by: Office created
- Succeeded by: Segundo Singzon

1st Governor of Cebu
- In office 1899–1901
- Appointed by: Philippine Commission
- Preceded by: Office created
- Succeeded by: Juan Climaco

Personal details
- Born: May 22, 1863 Argao, Cebu, Captaincy General of the Philippines
- Died: 1955 (aged 91–92) Manila, Philippines
- Party: Popular Front
- Profession: Lawyer

Julio Llorente y Aballe (Argao, May 22, 1863 – Manila, 1955) was a Filipino jurist, the first governor of Cebu, Philippines and the first appointed governor of Samar during the American period, and the only Cebuano to be part of the Propaganda Movement in Spain.

== Early years and education ==
Julio Llorente was born on May 22, 1863 to parents Don Ceferino Llorente, a wealthy Spanish merchant, and Martina Aballe. He studied at the Ateneo de Manila University and at the Universidad Central de Madrid, where he acquired his Doctor of Law in 1881. While a student in Madrid, he was the only Cebuano to be part of the Propaganda Movement. He was a member of the editorial staff of España en Filipinas, a newspaper published by Filipino reformists, and collaborated with Jose P. Rizal and Marcelo H. del Pilar in instituting the unification of Filipino groups under one association. He was also a member of the nationalist group R.D.L.M. that was founded by Rizal in Paris, France.

== Career ==
Llorente was appointed alternate magistrate when the Royal Audiencia was inaugurated on July 1, 1887, and in 1891, he worked as segundo teniente of the Ayuntamiento of Cebu By December 31, 1898, he was appointed as the president of the junta popular of the municipality of Cebu by the Philippine Republic when it established the provincial and municipal governments of Cebu. He also became the vice-president of the Cebu Provincial Council when it was approved by General Emilio Aguinaldo on January 24, 1898, with Luis Flores as president, Mariano Veloso as councilor of finance, General Arcadio Maxilom as councilor of police, and Segundo Singson as councilor of justice.

=== American period ===
When the American forces landed in Cebu, he agreed to surrender the province to the Americans on February 21, 1899. However, Maxilom and Juan Climaco, who was in charge of war preparations, led the anti-American resistance.

By April 16, 1899, he was appointed as provincial president of Cebu during a convention representing 40 out of 58 towns of Cebu, replacing the outgoing president Luis Flores. His term was cut short in June 1899 and Lt. Col. Thomas Harner took over as military governor due to the ongoing revolt led by General Arcadio Maxilom who refused to surrender to recognize the American rule. On May 4, 1899, he issued an advisory against giving out money or food to the people in the military service and informing Maxilom that his office was abolished, a move to tilt the balance in the leadership struggle with Maxilom.

On April 18, 1901, the Philippine Commission established the civil governments in Cebu and appointed Julio Llorente as governor. Also appointed were Leoncio Alburo as secretary, Fred S. Young as treasurer, James F. Case as supervisor, and Miguel Logarta as fiscal. His stint was marked with collaboration with the Americans, believing in their rule and that continued resistance would bring more destruction, and suggested that law enforcement agencies such as the Philippine Constabulary, municipal police, and a secret service be restored to track the peace and order situations of municipalities. As governor, he was taken to task in addressing the widespread collapse of infrastructures due to the war, dwindled government funds, and epidemics.

=== 1902 local elections ===
Llorente ran for when a general election was held after American troops withdrew from the island and the Philippine Commission restored the civilian government in Cebu on December 20, 1901. However, he lost to General Juan Climaco during the election held from February 3 to 5, 1902.

After the elections, he was appointed by the American colonizers as governor of Samar, becoming the province's first governor. By 1903, he became the judge of the Court of First Instance in the 12th Legislative District, which covered the provinces of Leyte and Samar, and then later transferred under the 4th district that was composed of the provinces Nueva Ecija, Tarlac, and Pampanga for a decade.

== Historical commemoration ==
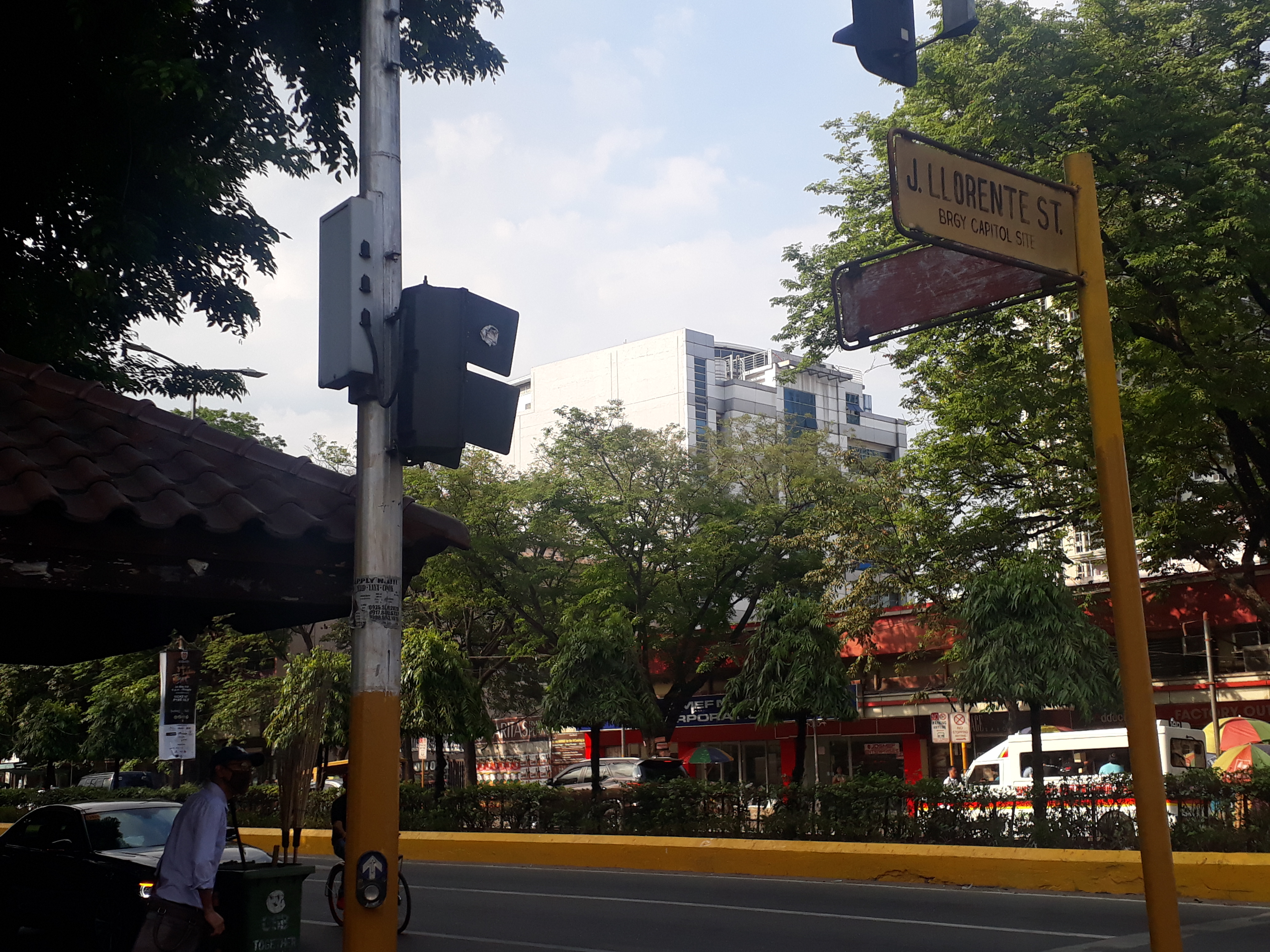
Street sign of J. Llorente Street, Cebu City

- The Julio Llorente Street in Cebu City, formerly known as Adelfa Street, was named in his honor.
- The town of Llorente in Eastern Samar was also named after him.
