= Arsenio Climaco =

Governor of Cebu, Philippines (1923-1930)

The Honorable Arsenio V. Climaco
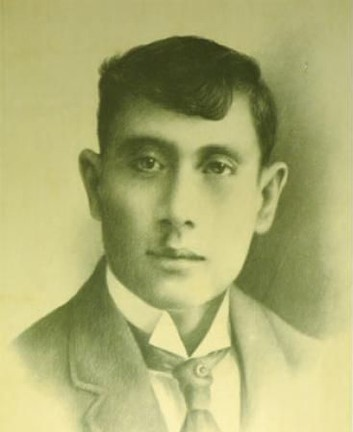

6th Governor of Cebu
- In office 1923–1930
- Preceded by: Manuel A. Roa
- Succeeded by: Mariano Jesús D. Cuenco

7th Municipal President of Cebu
- In office 1913–1916
- Preceded by: Vicente L. Teves
- Succeeded by: Fructuoso R. Ramos

Personal details
- Born: June 24, 1870
- Died: November 15, 1952 (aged 82)
- Relations: Juan Faller Climaco (grandfather)

Arsenio Veloso Climaco (Toledo, June 24, 1870– Cebu City, November 15, 1952), the son of Valeriano (sibling of former governor Juan Clímaco) and Gliceria Veloso, was born on June 24, 1870 and grandson of Juan F. Climaco. Arsenio Climaco, who married Juanita Osmeña, was the Governor of Cebu, Philippines from 1923 until 1930, succeeding Manuel Roa. The Great Depression began during his tenure, and he worked on repairing infrastructure damaged by a typhoon. He died on November 15, 1952. On September 10, 1968, the Cebu City Council renamed Orchid Street as Gov. Arsenio Climaco Street.
