= Rene Espina =

Filipino lawyer, politician, and legislator (1929–2019)

The Honorable Rene Espina
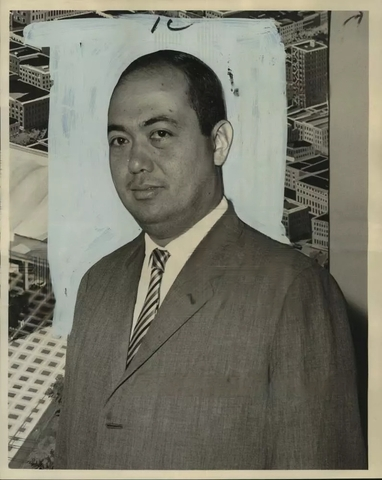
- Espina in 1964

18th Governor of Cebu
- In office December 30, 1963 – December 30, 1969
- Vice Governor: Priscillano Almendras (1963–1967); Osmundo G. Rama (1968–1969)
- Preceded by: Francisco Remotigue
- Succeeded by: Osmundo G. Rama

Secretary of the Public Works, Transportation, and Communication
- In office November 1968 – September 24, 1969
- President: Ferdinand Marcos
- Preceded by: Antonio Raquiza
- Succeeded by: Manuel Syquio

Senator of the Philippines
- In office December 30, 1969 – September 23, 1972

Personal details
- Born: December 26, 1929 Tinago, Cebu City, Cebu, Philippine Islands
- Died: September 13, 2019 (aged 89) Cebu City, Cebu, Philippines
- Party: UNIDO (1984–1986); KBL (1978–1984); Nacionalista (1969–1972); Liberal (1963–1969)
- Education: University of Southern Philippines
- Profession: Lawyer

Jesus Marino "Rene" Gandiongco Espina (December 26, 1929 – September 13, 2019) was a Filipino lawyer, legislator, and politician. He served as Governor of the province of Cebu, Philippines (1963–1969) and Senator (1970–1973).

== Early life ==
Rene Espina was born to Rafael Webb Espina and Tarcela Veloso Gandiongco in Cebu City, Cebu on December 26, 1929. He earned his law degree from the University of Southern Philippines and was one of the top passers from the bar exams when he became lawyer on January 22, 1955. The family's old house was located along Gervasio Lavilles Street, Cebu City. His marriage to Rufinita de Leon Remollo from Negros Oriental bore three children, including Rene Mari, Jean Franco, and Cebu City councilor Erik Miguel Espina, who was appointed by Rodrigo Duterte to replace dismissed councilor James Anthony Cuenco.

== Career ==
Espina was appointed Social Security System chair by then President Diosdado Macapagal from 1962 to 1963. During this time, Espina resided in Barrio Guadalupe, Cebu City.

=== Governor of Cebu ===
He received the endorsement of Macapagal as the official candidate for governor of the Liberal Party on September 9, 1963. On November 12, 1963, he defeated incumbent governor Francisco "Kikoy" Remotigue of the Nacionalista Party by over 73,000 votes and was elected Governor of Cebu. Priscillano Almendras was voted Vice Governor and the members of the Provincial Board were Nazario Pacquiao, Salutario Fernandez and Isidro Escario. Espina switched to Nacionalista Party during his campaign for reelection as governor in 1967, and won over Priscillano Almendras of the Liberal Party.

=== Cabinet member ===
Then President Ferdinand Marcos appointed him as Secretary of the Public Works, Transportation, and Communication in November 1968, serving as both governor and member of the Cabinet. It was during this time that the plans for the Mactan Bridge were initiated, and Espina oversaw the completion of its construction when he became part of the advisers of Marcos after Congress was dissolved on the establishment of martial law in the country in 1972.

=== Senator ===
He resigned from the Cabinet post to run for the Senate under the Nacionalista Party in September 1969, and he was succeeded by Antonio Syquio. On 11 November 1969, he was voted Senator of the 7th Congress and served from 1970 to 1973. He crafted the country's first anti-drug law, Republic Act 6425 otherwise known as the Dangerous Drugs Act of 1972.

During the 1978 election for the Interim Batasang Pambansa, he was one of the 13 candidates together with Eduardo Gullas, Ramon Durano III, Tito Calderon, Emilio Osmeña and Antonio Cuenco for the Marcos-backed political party Kilusang Bagong Lipunan (KBL) to represent Region VII. However, none of them were elected and instead, all 13 candidates from the local political party, Pusyon Bisaya that included Natalio Bacalso and which received widespread support, were voted to represent all seats for the region.

== Later years ==
Espina was a columnist for the Manila Bulletin.

On April 11, 2019, 110 farmers were installed as agrarian reform beneficiaries by the Department of Agrarian Reform (DAR) on the 150-hectare land owned by Espina in Polo, Tanjay City, Negros Oriental.

== Death ==
Governor Espina died on September 13, 2019, at a private hospital in Cebu City due to an untreated infection brought about by dialysis. He was already undergoing dialysis thrice a week due to his previous untreated pneumonia that affected his kidneys. He was 89 years of age.
