= Osmundo Rama =

Filipino Visayan medical doctor and politician from Cebu, Philippines

The Honorable Osmundo Rama
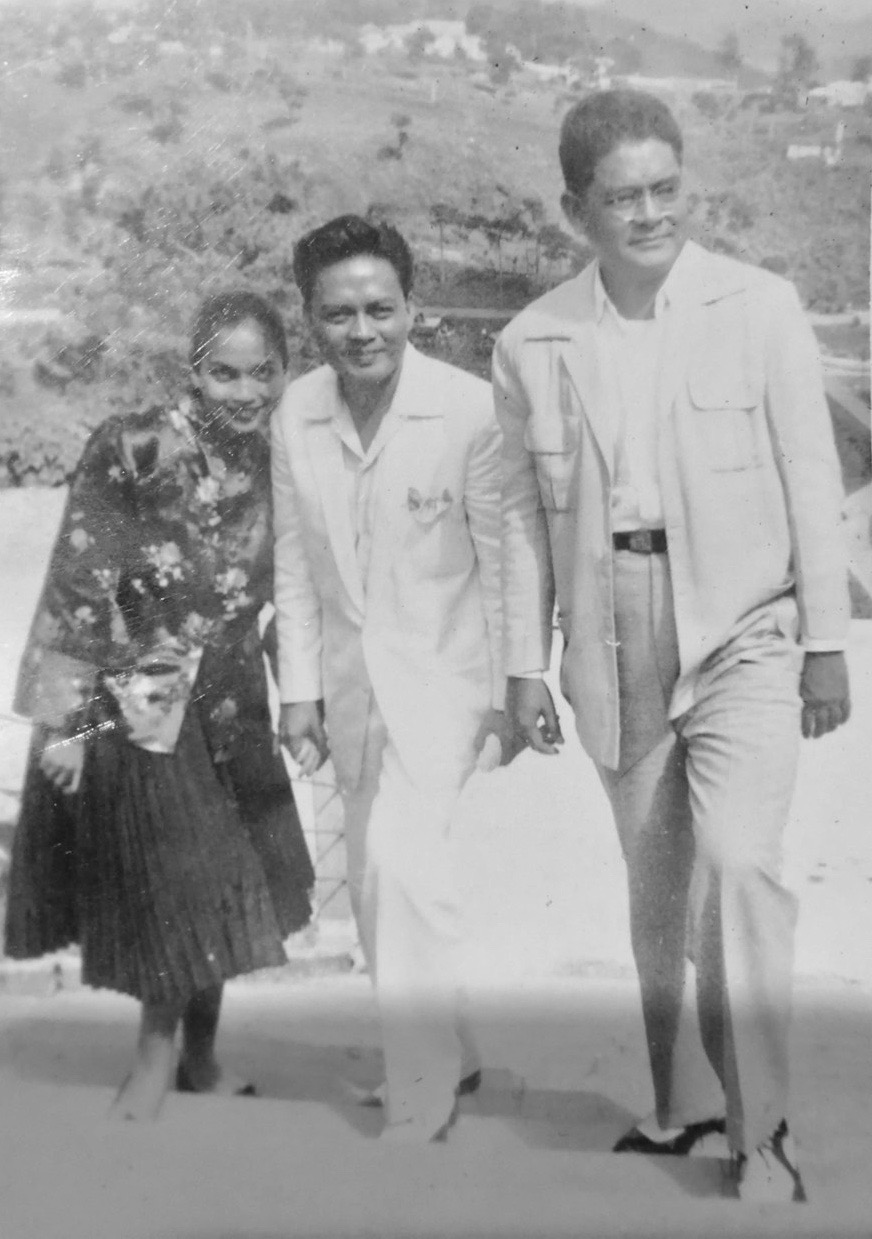
- Governor Osmundo Rama on the far right

19th & 21st Governor of Cebu
- In office December 30, 1969 – December 30, 1975
- Vice Governor: Pablo P. Garcia (1969–1971); Salutario J. Fernandez (1971–1975)
- Preceded by: Rene G. Espina
- Succeeded by: Eduardo Gullas
- In office March 26, 1986 – February 2, 1988
- Vice Governor: Democrito Barcenas
- Preceded by: Eduardo Gullas
- Succeeded by: Emilio Osmeña

Vice Governor of Cebu
- In office 1968–1969
- Governor: Rene G. Espina
- Preceded by: Priscillano Almendras
- Succeeded by: Pablo P. Garcia

Member of the Cebu City Council
- In office 1955–1963

Personal details
- Born: Osmundo Genson Rama; September 23, 1914
- Died: November 13, 1998 (aged 84)
- Party: Liberal (1971-1998)
- Other political affiliations: Nacionalista (1955-1971)
- Parents: Vicente Rama; Catalina Genson
- Relatives: Rama family
- Education: University of San Carlos; University of Santo Tomas
- Profession: Physician

Osmundo "Mundo" Genson Rama (September 23, 1914 — November 13, 1998) was a Filipino Visayan physician and politician from Cebu, Philippines. He served as Governor of Cebu province (1969-1976; 1986-1988) and Vice Governor (1968-1969).

== Early life ==
The son of former Senator Vicente Rama and Catalina Genson, Osmundo G. Rama studied at Colegio de San Carlos, graduated at the University of Santo Tomas with a medical degree and passed the board exams in 1934. He also later acquired a law degree from the University of San Carlos.

His son, Enrique Rama, served as Vice Governor of Cebu from 1988–1992.

== Career ==
During the first general elections on November 8, 1955, he was elected member of the Cebu City Council, and he would serve another term in 1959. In 1963, he ran for Cebu City mayor but lost to Sergio Osmeña Jr. Then, running under the Nacionalista Party, he became Vice Governor and served from 1968 to 1969.

In 1969, incumbent Governor Rene G. Espina resigned in preparation for his campaign for the Senate. Rama assumed the office of the governorship. During the 1971 elections, he was elected Governor of the province of Cebu, a position he would hold until 1976. Deciding to switch to campaign under the Liberal Party, he defeated Beatriz Durano of the Nacionalista Party in 1971. Eduardo Gullas was appointed by then President Ferdinand Marcos as governor to reorganize the provincial government and replaced Rama during the martial law years in 1976 until 1986. After the EDSA revolution, Rama was appointed in charge for the office of the governor, replacing Gullas, and served from 1986 until 1988.

During his time as governor, he advocated for agriculture and education. The President Marcos Naga Provincial High School and the agricultural building were also constructed. In addition, he endorsed the memorandum of agreement granting Cebu CFI Community Cooperative, a cooperative providing lending services to members, the lease of a vacant lot beside the Cebu Provincial Capitol building for 25 years.
