= Juan Clímaco =

Second Governor of Cebu, Philippines

The Honorable Juan Clímaco
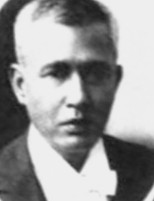
- Portrait as governor of Cebu, published c. 1905, by the United States Bureau of the Census

2nd Governor of Cebu
- In office March 5, 1902 – March 6, 1906
- Preceded by: Julio Llorente y Aballe
- Succeeded by: Sergio Osmeña Sr.

Personal details
- Born: Juan María Januario Clímaco y Faller; December 24, 1859 Toledo, Cebu, Captaincy General of the Philippines, Spanish Empire
- Died: July 16, 1907 (aged 47) Cebu, Insular Government of the Philippine Islands

General Juan Clímaco y Faller (December 24, 1859 – July 16, 1907) was the second governor of Cebu, Philippines, the first governor elected to the position, and a Cebu revolutionary during the Philippine–American War.

== Early years ==
Juan Clímaco was born to a wealthy family in Toledo, Cebu, Philippines on December 24, 1859. He was married to Maria Regina Veloso y Ramas who was a mestiza of Iberian and Chinese extraction and a granddaughter of the Portuguese consul to Cebu. Before the Philippine revolution against the Spaniards, he served as gobernadorcillo of Toledo and was popularly called "Tan Hantoy" ("Tan" as short for kapitán or captain). He wrote the monograph of the municipality of Toledo for the Philippine Exposition that opened in Madrid on April 1, 1887, which was described as subversive and counterproductive to the intentions of the exposition. At that time, all municipalities were asked to answer 81 questions intended to introduce the Philippines as a Spanish colony to Spain and to the entire Europe.

== Philippine-American war ==
Upon the establishment of the revolutionary council by Luis Flores, Clímaco was chosen as chief of staff with Arcadio M. Maxilom as general. He financed the revolutionary efforts and was assisted by Andres Jayme, who was his deputy and aide. He was later promoted to general by Emilio Aguinaldo.

Flores called for a meeting among Cebu officials of the Philippine Republic on February 10, 1899, to discuss the war against the American forces. Clímaco was designated to the task of war preparations. By February 21, 1899, when the American forces landed in Cebu and demanded surrender, Clímaco threw support on the anti-American revolt led by General Arcadio Maxilom and traveled to Samar to gather arms. Flores, together with Julio Llorente, who would later be appointed as the first governor by the Americans, agreed to surrender the province.

By October 2, 1900, Clímaco later wrote a memorial delivered to the United States Congress advocating for Philippine independence and justifying the cause of the revolt. In addition, he wrote a manifesto on April 1, 1901, urging the revolutionaries to continue the fight for independence should the news of Emilio Aguinaldo's capture would be proven true. Maxilom and Clímaco, together with 40 of their men, 30 rifles, and 4 canons, surrendered to the Americans on October 27, 1901, marking the end of Cebu's organized resistance.

== Politics ==
In 1902, upon the installation of Cebu's civilian government, first election for governor was held. Then incumbent governor Julio Llorente, who was appointed by the Americans a year earlier, ran for another term. However, Clímaco won over Llorente on February 5, 1902, and assumed office on March 5, 1902. The Americans were initially not too pleased with his election particularly for his role in Cebu's anti-American revolt. However, he cooperated with the U.S. forces, and called for peace during the speech he made in his inauguration and rehabilitation of infrastructures including schools, postal delivery system, public works, and agriculture.

He ran again for the second term and was reelected on February 4, 1904. During his term as governor, he initiated the construction of the road that connects Tabunok, Talisay to Toledo now known as Manipis Road, as well as the establishment of an electrical system called Visayan Electric Company (VECO). The port of Cebu was expanded, marking it as the country's modern harbor then.

== Later years ==
US president William Howard Taft appointed Clímaco to the delegation for the St. Louis Exposition in the United States and then appointed Sergio Osmeña Sr. as acting governor. On Clímaco's arrival in Hong Kong, he got sick and was unable to complete the trip. Osmeña succeeded him as governor on March 6, 1906.

Clímaco died at the age of 47 on July 16, 1907.

== Commemoration ==
- Juan Clímaco Street, which stretches from Paseo de Magallanes to Sanciangko Street in Cebu City, was named after him.
- Barangay General Juan Clímaco in Toledo, Cebu, formerly known as Sitio Magdugó, was also named after him.
