= 2013 Cebu local elections =

Philippine election

2013 Cebu gubernatorial election
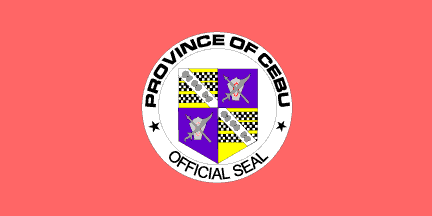
- May 13, 2013
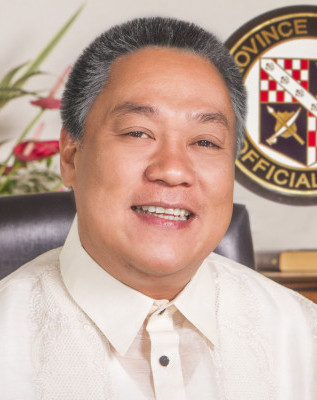

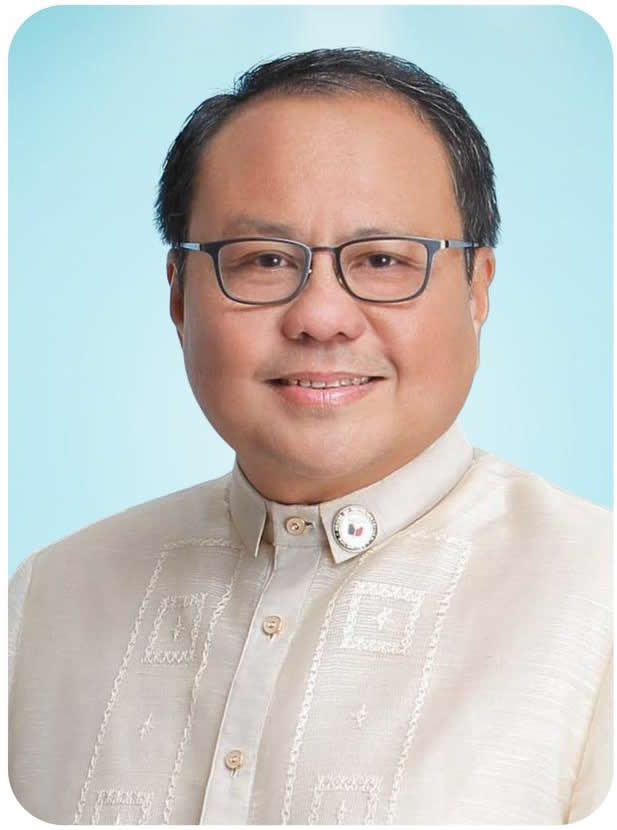
Nominee	Hilario Davide III	Pablo John Garcia
Party	Liberal	NUP
Running mate	Agnes Magpale	Ramon Durano IV
Popular vote	614,389	448,826
Percentage	56.09%	40.98%
Governor before election
Gwendolyn Garcia (elected)
UNA
Agnes Magpale (acting)
Liberal
Elected Governor
Hilario Davide III
Liberal

Local elections were held in Cebu on May 13, 2013, within the Philippine general election. Voters will select candidates for all local positions: a town mayor, vice mayor and town councilors, as well as members of the Sangguniang Panlalawigan, the vice-governor, governor and representatives for the six districts of Cebu. Incumbent governor Gwendolyn Garcia is barred for seeking another term because she is limited to three terms only.

== Gubernatorial and vice gubernatorial election ==
On April 27, 2012, incumbent governor Gwendolyn Garcia announced her intention to run for senator. She also announced that her brother incumbent 3rd District Representative Pablo John Garcia will be running as governor of the province. On September 1, 2012, One Cebu announced that former Danao vice mayor Ramon "Boboy" Durano IV as Garcia's running mate.

On May 12, 2012, businessman Glenn Soco announced his intention to run for vice governor. He ran for that position in 2010 as running mate of Garcia. However, he lost to incumbent Greg Sanchez. He filed a protest, but Sanchez died on April 29, 2011.

On May 25, 2012, Garcia joined PDP-Laban and was included in the senatorial line-up of the United Nationalist Alliance.

On September 20, 2012 Vice President Jejomar Binay announced that Garcia withdrew her senatorial bid and will run for the House of Representatives instead.

On September 28, 2012, Hilario Davide III, was announced by the Liberal Party as its candidate for governor. Davide first ran in 2010, but was defeated by Garcia. His running-mate is incumbent vice governor Agnes Magpale of the Barug Alang sa Kauswagan ug Demokrasya or Bakud. Magpale assumed as vice governor upon the death of former vice governor Greg Sanchez.

On December 17, 2012, Incumbent governor Gwendolyn Garcia ordered a six-month suspension. (See full description about the suspension here)

== Provincial Elections ==
The candidates for governor and vice governor with the highest number of votes wins the seat; they are voted separately, therefore, they may be of different parties when elected.

=== Candidates for Governor ===
Parties are as stated in their certificate of candidacies.

Incumbent Gwendolyn Garcia is on her third term and is ineligible to run. She is running for congresswoman. Her brother, incumbent congressman Pablo John Garcia is running in her place.

Cebu gubernatorial election
Party	Candidate	Votes	%
Liberal	Hilario Davide III	614,389	56.09
NUP	Pablo John Garcia	448,826	40.98
Independent	Klasmit Boyet Cortes	24,552	2.24
Independent	Lito Bulala	7,557	0.69
Total votes		1,343,006	100.00
Liberal gain from NUP			

=== Candidates for Vice-Governor ===
Agnes Magpale is the incumbent after vice governor Gregorio Sanchez (+) died, she is running against businessman Glenn Soco and former Danao city vice mayor Ramon Durano IV.

Cebu Vice-Gubernatorial election
Party	Candidate	Votes	%
Liberal	Agnes Magpale	510,383	49.36
PMP	Glenn Soco	357,007	34.53
UNA	Ramon Durano IV	166,647	16.12
Total votes		1,342,257	100.00
Liberal hold			

== Congressional elections ==
Each of Cebu's six and 3 others legislative districts will elect each representative to the House of Representatives. The candidate with the highest number of votes wins the seat.

=== 1st District ===
Incumbent Eduardo Gullas is term limited; he will run for mayor of Talisay City. His party nominated his grandson, Gerald Anthony.

Philippine House of Representatives election at Cebu's 1st district
Party	Candidate	Votes	%
Nacionalista	Gerald Anthony Gullas, Jr.	153,514	34.87
Valid ballots		153,514	34.87
Invalid or blank votes		286,792	65.13
Total votes		240,306	100.00
Nacionalista hold			

=== 2nd District ===
Pablo Garcia is the incumbent.

Philippine House of Representatives election at Cebu's 2nd district
Party	Candidate	Votes	%
Liberal	Wilfredo Caminero	84,256	40.88
NUP	Pablo Garcia	77,625	37.66
Independent	Simeon Kintanar	8,607	4.18
Valid ballots		170,488	82.69
Invalid or blank votes		35,619	17.28
Total votes		206,107	100.00
Liberal gain from NUP			

=== 3rd District ===
Incumbent Pablo John Garcia is running for governor instead. His sister Incumbent Governor Gwendolyn Garcia is party's nominee.

Philippine House of Representatives election at Cebu's 3rd district
Party	Candidate	Votes	%
UNA	Gwendolyn Garcia	94,305	42.71
Liberal	Geraldine Yapha	89,952	40.74
Valid ballots		184,257	83.44
Invalid or blank votes		36,560	16.56
Total votes		220,817	100.00
UNA gain from NUP			

=== 4th District ===
Benhur Salimbangon is the incumbent.

Philippine House of Representatives election at Cebu's 4th district
Party	Candidate	Votes	%
NUP	Benhur Salimbangon	117,844	55.73
Liberal	Celestino Martinez III	71,438	33.79
Valid ballots		189,282	89.52
Invalid or blank votes		22,157	10.48
Total votes		211,439	100.00
NUP hold			

=== 5th District ===
Incumbent Ramon Durano VI is term-limited and running for Danao city vice mayor instead, his brother former tourism secretary Joseph Ace Durano is running under Liberal.

Philippine House of Representatives election at Cebu's 5th district
Party	Candidate	Votes	%
Liberal	Joseph Ace Durano	162,036	65.11
1-Cebu	Alfie Pepito	21,936	8.81
Independent	Gilbert Wagas	10,120	4.07
Valid ballots		194,092	78.00
Invalid or blank votes		54,578	22.00
Total votes		248,850	100.00
Liberal gain from NPC			

=== 6th District ===
Luigi Quisumbing is the incumbent, his opponent is former congresswoman Nerissa Soon-Ruiz running under UNA.

Philippine House of Representatives election at Cebu's 6th district
Party	Candidate	Votes	%
Liberal	Luigi Quisumbing	125,757	57.98
UNA	Nerissa Soon-Ruiz	71,209	32.83
Valid ballots		196,966	90.80
Invalid or blank votes		19,948	9.20
Total votes		216,914	100.00
Liberal hold			

=== Cebu City ===
==== 1st District ====
Incumbent Rachel del Mar is not running to give way to her father, former congressman Raul del Mar who is vying for seat again, he will face actress and manager Annabelle Rama.

Philippine House of Representatives election at Cebu City's 1st district
Party	Candidate	Votes	%
Liberal	Raul del Mar	133,149	67.84
UNA	Annabelle Rama	35,716	18.20
Independent	Marlo Maamo	7,092	3.61
Independent	Florencio Villarin	1,558	0.79
Independent	Donato Navarro	442	0.23
Independent	Pablo Junex Doronio	353	0.18
Independent	Victor Mañalac	287	0.15
Valid ballots		184,597	94.06
Invalid or blank votes		11,662	5.94
Total votes		196,259	100.00
Liberal hold			

==== 2nd District ====
Incumbent Tomas Osmeña is running for mayor against incumbent Cebu City mayor Mike Rama, his party nominated Rodrigo Abellanosa for south district congressional post.

Philippine House of Representatives election at Cebu City's 2nd district
Party	Candidate	Votes	%
Liberal	Rodrigo Abellanosa	123,757	50.90
UNA	Aristotle Batuhan	99,073	40.75
Valid ballots		222,830	91.65
Invalid or blank votes		20,311	8.35
Total votes		243,141	100.00
Liberal hold			

=== Lapu-Lapu City ===
Incumbent Arturo Radaza is not running, his daughter Aileen Radaza is party's nominee.

Philippine House of Representatives election at Lapu-Lapu City
Party	Candidate	Votes	%
Lakas–Kampi	Aileen Radaza	60,602	44.77
Liberal	Angel Rodriguez	31,630	24.72
Independent	Remegio Oyao	14,375	11.33
Valid ballots		106,607	84.03
Invalid or blank votes		20,255	15.97
Total votes		126,862	100.00
Lakas hold			

== Sangguniang Panlalawigan elections ==
All 6 Districts of Cebu will elect Sangguniang Panlalawigan or provincial board members.

=== 1st District ===
- City: Carcar, Naga City, Talisay City
- Municipalities: Minglanilla, San Fernando, Sibonga

Cebu 1st District Sangguniang Panlalawigan election
Party	Candidate	Votes	%
1-Cebu	Julian Daan	156,211	52.83
Liberal	Raul "Yayoy" Alcoseba	69,502	24.06
Nacionalista	Serrie Restauro	66,784	23.12
Total votes		238,850	100.00

=== 2nd District ===
- Municipalities: Alcantara, Alcoy, Alegria, Argao, Badian, Boljoon, Dalaguete, Dumanjug, Ginatilan, Malabuyoc, Moalboal, Oslob, Ronda, Samboan, Santander

Cebu 2nd District Sangguniang Panlalawigan election
Party	Candidate	Votes	%
Liberal	Peter John Calderon	82,603	38.07
Liberal	Dong Baricuatro	53,375	24.60
NUP	Cary Kintanar	50,257	23.16
NUP	Daday Celis	30,735	14.17
Total votes		206,107	100.00

=== 3rd District ===
- City: Toledo City
- Municipalities: Aloguinsan, Asturias, Balamban, Barili, Pinamungajan, Tuburan,

Cebu 3rd District Sangguniang Panlalawigan election
Party	Candidate	Votes	%
1-Cebu	Alex Binghay	94,774	37.99
Liberal	Gigi Sanchez	76,912	30.83
PMP	Ian Zambo	73,176	29.33
1-Cebu	Tommy Yu	4,629	1.86
Total votes		249,491	100.00

=== 4th District ===
- City: Bogo
- Municipalities: Bantayan, Daanbantayan, Madridejos, Medellin, San Remigio, Santa Fe, Tabogon, Tabuelan

Cebu 4th District Sangguniang Panlalawigan election
Party	Candidate	Votes	%
NUP	Sun Shimura	89,835	34.70
NUP	Benjun Mondigo	87,260	33.70
Liberal	Rhappy Luche	40,005	15.45
Liberal	Joe Layon	36,118	13.95
Independent	Chito Arreglo	5,694	2.20
Total votes		211,439	100.00

=== 5th District ===
- City: Danao
- Municipalities: Borbon, Carmen, Catmon, Compostela, Liloan, Pilar, Poro, San Francisco, Sogod, Tudela

Cebu 5th District Sangguniang Panlalawigan election
Party	Candidate	Votes	%
BAKUD	Migs Magpale	95,616	33.78
BAKUD	Jude Thaddeus Sybico	94,155	33.26
1-Cebu	Monching Durano	63,073	22.28
1-Cebu	Ben Batiquin	30,209	10.67
Total votes		248,850	100.00

=== 6th District ===
- City: Mandaue City
- Municipalities: Consolacion, Cordova

Cebu 6th District Sangguniang Panlalawigan election
Party	Candidate	Votes	%
Liberal	Teddy Ouano	112,661	42.56
Liberal	Arleigh Sitoy	80,161	30.28
UNA	Elmer Cabahug	71,891	27.16
Total votes		216,194	100.00

== City and Municipal elections ==
All municipalities and City of Cebu will elect mayor and vice-mayor this election. The candidates for mayor and vice mayor with the highest number of votes wins the seat; they are voted separately, therefore, they may be of different parties when elected. Below is the list of mayoralty and vice-mayoralty candidates of each city and municipalities per district.

=== 1st District, Mayoral election ===
- City: Carcar, Naga City, Talisay City
- Municipalities: Minglanilla, San Fernando, Sibonga

==== Carcar ====
Nicepuro Apura is the incumbent. His primary opponent is councilor Roberto Aleonar, Jr.

Carcar mayoralty election
Party	Candidate	Votes	%
1-Cebu	Nicepuro Apura	20,531	55.53
Liberal	Roberto Aleonar, Jr.	15,976	43.21
Independent	Mariano Alegabres	268	0.72
Independent	Vicente Balderona, Jr.	199	0.54
Total votes		39,804	100.00
1-Cebu hold			

==== Naga City ====
Valdemar Chiong is the incumbent.

Naga City mayoralty election
Party	Candidate	Votes	%
Nacionalista	Valdemar Chiong	23,270	91.18
Independent	Junior Canoneo	2,250	8.82
Total votes		28,066	100.00
Nacionalista hold			

==== Talisay City ====
Incumbent Socrates Fernandez is not running. Congressman Eduardo Gullas is his party's nominee.

Talisay City mayoralty election
Party	Candidate	Votes	%
Liberal	Johnny Delos Reyes	36,943	50.53
Nacionalista	Eduardo Gullas	36,163	49.47
Total votes		79,685	100.00
Liberal gain from Nacionalista			

==== Minglanilla ====
Incumbent Eduardo Selma is not running. His party nominated vice mayor Elanito Peña.

Minglanilla mayoralty election
Party	Candidate	Votes	%
Nacionalista	Elanito Peña	20,675	58.65
Liberal	Marlo Cañada	14,579	41.35
Total votes		37,984	100.00
Nacionalista hold			

==== San Fernando ====
Neneth Reluya is the incumbent.

San Fernando mayoralty election
Party	Candidate	Votes	%
Nacionalista	Neneth Reluya	15,813	50.56
Liberal	Abe Canoy	14,975	49.44
Total votes		31,829	100.00
Nacionalista hold			

==== Sibonga ====
Lionel Bacaltos is the incumbent.

Sibonga mayoralty election
Party	Candidate	Votes	%
Nacionalista	Lionel Bacaltos	19,521	96.13
Independent	Eutiquio Villacura, Jr.	786	3.87
Total votes		22,689	100.00
Nacionalista hold			

=== 2nd District, Mayoral Election ===
- Municipalities: Alcantara, Alcoy, Alegria, Argao, Badian, Boljoon, Dalaguete, Dumanjug, Ginatilan, Malabuyoc, Moalboal, Oslob, Ronda, Samboan, Santander

==== Alcantara ====
Prudencio Barino, Jr. is the incumbent. his opponent is councilor Fredo Cañete.

Alcantara mayoralty election
Party	Candidate	Votes	%
Independent	Fredo Cañete	4,339	55.76
1-Cebu	Prudencio Barino, Jr.	3,443	44.24
Total votes		8,508	100.00
Independent gain from 1-Cebu			

==== Alcoy ====
Nick Delo Santos is the incumbent. his opponent is councilor Ompong Delo Santos.

Alcoy mayoralty election
Party	Candidate	Votes	%
1-Cebu	Nick Delo Santos	4,451	68.49
Independent	Ompong Delo Santos	2,048	31.51
Total votes		6,996	100.00
1-Cebu hold			

==== Alegria ====
Incumbent Emelita Guisadio is not running, her husband Raul Guisadio is running for her place.

Alegria mayoralty election
Party	Candidate	Votes	%
Liberal	Verna Magallon	6,212	51.46
1-Cebu	Raul Guisadio	5,860	48.54
Total votes		12,875	100.00
Liberal gain from 1-Cebu			

==== Argao ====
Incumbent Edsel Galeos is running for his reelection unopposed.

Argao mayoralty election
Party	Candidate	Votes	%
Liberal	Edsel Galeos	26,748	100.00
Total votes		35,992	100.00
Liberal hold			

==== Badian ====
Robburt Librando is the incumbent. he will face vice mayor Fructouso Caballero.

Badian mayoralty election
Party	Candidate	Votes	%
1-Cebu	Robburt Librando	9,050	58.52
Liberal	Fructouso Caballero	6,184	39.99
Independent	Hanny Agravante	230	1.49
Total votes		17,510	100.00
1-Cebu hold			

==== Boljoon ====
Incumbent Teresita Delis is not running, vice mayor Merlou Derama is her party's nominee.

Boljoon mayoralty election
Party	Candidate	Votes	%
Liberal	Merlou Derama	4,184	55.71
Independent	Inday Mubarak-Obaid	3,326	44.29
Total votes		8,279	100.00
Liberal hold			

==== Dalaguete ====
Incumbent Ronald Allan Cesante is running for her reelection unopposed.

Dalaguete mayoralty election
Party	Candidate	Votes	%
1-Cebu	Ronald Allan Cesante	20,041	100.00
Total votes		28,581	100.00
1-Cebu hold			

==== Dumanjug ====
Nelson Garcia is the incumbent.

Dumanjug mayoralty election
Party	Candidate	Votes	%
NUP	Nelson Garcia	10,897	56.19
Liberal	Cesar Baricuatro	8,497	43.81
Total votes		20,953	100.00
NUP hold			

==== Ginatilan ====
Incumbent Antonio Singco is term-limited, vice mayor Dean Michael Singco is his party's nominee.

Ginatilan mayoralty election
Party	Candidate	Votes	%
1-Cebu	Dean Michael Singco	3,856	45.90
Liberal	Liza Toledo	3,774	44.93
Independent	Lordy Cabunilas	461	5.49
Independent	Ites Quijano	245	2.92
Independent	Clarito Dinglasa	43	0.51
Independent	Pat Singco	13	0.15
Independent	Jaime Lim	8	0.10
Total votes		8,947	100.00
1-Cebu hold			

==== Malabuyoc ====
Incumbent Daisy Creus is not running, vice mayor Lito Creus is her party's nominee.

Malabuyoc mayoralty election
Party	Candidate	Votes	%
1-Cebu	Lito Creus	4,462	54.62
Liberal	Erlinda Piedad	3,722	45.48
Total votes		8,759	100.00
1-Cebu hold			

==== Moalboal ====
Innocentes Cabaron is the incumbent.

Moalboal mayoralty election
Party	Candidate	Votes	%
1-Cebu	Inocentes Cabaron	11,184	85.89
Liberal	Joe Temblor	1,952	14.11
Total votes		16,042	100.00
1-Cebu hold			

==== Oslob ====
Ronald Guaren is the incumbent. his opponent is vice mayor Jun Tumulak.

Oslob mayoralty election
Party	Candidate	Votes	%
1-Cebu	Ronald Guaren	6,896	56.11
Liberal	Jun Tumulak	5,394	43.89
Total votes		12,929	100.00
1-Cebu hold			

==== Ronda ====
Nonie Blanco is the incumbent.

Ronda mayoralty election
Party	Candidate	Votes	%
1-Cebu	Nonie Blanco	4,144	79.05
Liberal	Teban Sia	1,098	20.95
Total votes		5,602	100.00
1-Cebu hold			

==== Samboan ====
Raymond Joseph Calderon is the incumbent. His primary opponent is vice mayor Boy Capa.

Samboan mayoralty election
Party	Candidate	Votes	%
Liberal	Raymond Joseph Calderon	2,921	70.18
1-Cebu	Boy Capa	1,234	29.65
Independent	Elmer Principe	7	0.17
Total votes		4,465	100.00
Liberal hold			

==== Santander ====
Marilyn Wenceslao is the incumbent.

Santander mayoralty election
Party	Candidate	Votes	%
Liberal	Marilyn Wenceslao	6,072	64.80
1-Cebu	Maria Alona Ator	3,286	35.07
Independent	Amelia Mendez	13	0.14
Total votes		9,669	100.00
Liberal hold			

=== 3rd District, Mayoral Election ===
- City: Toledo City
- Municipalities: Aloguinsan, Asturias, Balamban, Barili, Pinamungajan, Tuburan

==== Toledo City ====
Rudy Espinosa is the incumbent. His opponent is former senator John Henry Osmeña.

Toledo City mayoralty election
Party	Candidate	Votes	%
NPC	John Henry Osmeña	24,591	55.76
1-Cebu	Rudy Espinosa	19,512	44.24
Total votes		47,803	100.00
NPC gain from 1-Cebu			

==== Aloguinsan ====
Incumbent Augustus Moreno is swapping post to her wife vice mayor Cynthia Moreno. Her main opponent is councilor Malou Ripdos.

Aloguinsan mayoralty election
Party	Candidate	Votes	%
1-Cebu	Cynthia Moreno	9,875	72.91
Liberal	Malou Ripdos	3,669	27.09
Total votes		14,888	100.00
1-Cebu hold			

==== Asturias ====
Incumbent Alan Adlawan is running for his reelection unopposed.

Asturias mayoralty election
Party	Candidate	Votes	%
1-Cebu	Alan Adlawan	15,279	100.00
Total votes		22,887	100.00
1-Cebu hold			

==== Balamban ====
Ace Binghay is the incumbent.

Balamban mayoralty election
Party	Candidate	Votes	%
1-Cebu	Ace Binghay	24,775	82.19
Independent	Loloy Narsico	5,367	17.81
Total votes		34,558	100.00
1-Cebu hold			

==== Barili ====
Teresito Mariñas is the incumbent. his opponent is vice mayor Marlon Garcia.

Barili mayoralty election
Party	Candidate	Votes	%
Liberal	Teresito Mariñas	19,347	58.93
1-Cebu	Marlon Garcia	13,482	41.07
Total votes		35,213	100.00
Liberal hold			

==== Pinamungajan ====
Incumbent Geraldine Yapha is running for Congress, Estralla Yapha is her party's nominee.

Pinamungajan mayoralty election
Party	Candidate	Votes	%
1-Cebu	Glenn Baricuatro	14,771	50.83
Liberal	Estrella Yapha	14,287	49.17
Total votes		30,997	100.00
1-Cebu hold			

==== Tuburan ====
Aljun Diamante is the incumbent. He's only opponent is former mayor Rose Marie Suezo

Tuburan mayoralty election
Party	Candidate	Votes	%
Liberal	Aljun Diamante	19,613	60.36
1-Cebu	Rose Marie Suezo	12,878	39.64
Total votes		34,491	100.00
Liberal hold			

=== 4th District, Mayoral Election ===
- City: Bogo
- Municipalities: Bantayan, Daanbantayan, Madridejos, Medellin, San Remigio, Santa Fe, Tabogon, Tabuelan

==== Bogo ====
Celestino Martinez, Jr. is the incumbent. his opponent is daughter of Congressman Benhur Salimbangon, Marie Daphne Salimbangon.

Bogo mayoralty election
Party	Candidate	Votes	%
Liberal	Celestino Martinez, Jr.	25,177	69.69
NUP	Marie Daphne Salimbangon	10,948	30.31
Total votes		38,480	100.00
Liberal hold			

==== Bantayan ====
Incumbent Ian Christopher Escario is running for his reelection unopposed.

Bantayan mayoralty election
Party	Candidate	Votes	%
NUP	Ian Christopher Escario	17,636	100.00
Total votes		27,626	100.00
NUP hold			

==== Daanbantayan ====
Maria Luisa Loot is the incumbent. his opponent is Augusto Corro.

Daanbantayan mayoralty election
Party	Candidate	Votes	%
Liberal	Augusto Corro	17,764	53.51
Nacionalista	Maria Luisa Loot	15,436	46.49
Total votes		34,966	100.00
Liberal gain from Nacionalista			

==== Madridejos ====
Salvador Dela Fuente is the incumbent.

Madridejos mayoralty election
Party	Candidate	Votes	%
NUP	Salvador Dela Fuente	9,753	63.98
Liberal	Dodo Salazar	5,491	36.02
Total votes		16,306	100.00
NUP hold			

==== Medellin ====
Ricardo Ramirez is the incumbent.

Medellin mayoralty election
Party	Candidate	Votes	%
NUP	Ricardo Ramirez	11,726	51.37
Liberal	Robbie Herrera	11,100	48.63
Total votes		25,231	100.00
NUP hold			

==== San Remigio ====
Jay Olivar is the incumbent. he will face former mayor Mariano Martinez.

San Remigio mayoralty election
Party	Candidate	Votes	%
Liberal	Mariano Martinez	14,591	53.87
NUP	Jay Olivar	12,496	46.13
Total votes		29,012	100.00
Liberal gain from NUP			

==== Santa Fe ====
Jong Jong Ilustrisimo is the incumbent.

Santa Fe mayoralty election
Party	Candidate	Votes	%
Liberal	Jong Jong Ilustrisimo	2,578	50.20
1-Cebu	Jose Esgana	2,541	49.48
Independent	Edmund Aniana	16	0.31
Total votes		5,524	100.00
Liberal hold			

==== Tabogon ====
Incumbent Eusebio Dungog is not running, Roland Quinain is his party's nominee.

Tabogon mayoralty election
Party	Candidate	Votes	%
NUP	Dodong Duterte	8,591	45.37
Liberal	Roland Quinain	7,873	41.58
1-Cebu	Lemar Alcover	2,471	13.05
Total votes		20,413	100.00
NUP gain from Liberal			

==== Tabuelan ====
Rex Casiano Gerona is the incumbent. his opponent is vice mayor Wilma Zamora.

Tabuelan mayoralty election
Party	Candidate	Votes	%
NUP	Rex Casiano Gerona	9,497	75.18
Liberal	Wilma Zamora	3,136	24.82
Total votes		13,701	100.00
NUP hold			

=== 5th District, Mayoral Election ===
- City: Danao
- Municipalities: Borbon, Carmen, Catmon, Compostela, Liloan, Pilar, Poro, San Francisco, Sogod, Tudela

==== Danao ====
Ramon Durano, Jr. is the incumbent. He will face his brother vice mayor Ramon Durano III.

Danao mayoralty election
Party	Candidate	Votes	%
Liberal	Ramon Durano III	36,417	64.91
1-Cebu	Ramon Durano, Jr.	19,684	35.09
Total votes		61,810	100.00
Liberal gain from 1-Cebu			

==== Borbon ====
Bernard Sepulveda is the incumbent.

Borbon mayoralty election
Party	Candidate	Votes	%
BAKUD	Bernard Sepulveda	9,736	66.12
PMP	Levi Manalili	4,988	33.88
Total votes		16,999	100.00

==== Carmen ====
Gerard Villamor is the incumbent.

Carmen mayoralty election
Party	Candidate	Votes	%
BAKUD	Gerard Villamor	14,690	63.59
PMP	Sonia Pua	7,194	31.14
Independent	Recto De Dios	1,218	5.27
Total votes		26,092	100.00

==== Catmon ====
Dan Jusay is the incumbent.

Catmon mayoralty election
Party	Candidate	Votes	%
BAKUD	Dan Jusay	8,730	62.35
UNA	Estrella Aribal	5,025	35.89
PMP	Elbert Roldan	247	1.76
Total votes		14,721	100.00

==== Compostela ====
Joel Quiño is the incumbent.

Compostela mayoralty election
Party	Candidate	Votes	%
BAKUD	Joel Quiño	12,080	57.85
1-Cebu	Ritchie Wagas	8,683	41.59
Independent	Kuditah Cabahug	117	0.56
Total votes		22,257	100.00

==== Liloan ====
Duke Frasco is the incumbent.

Liloan mayoralty election
Party	Candidate	Votes	%
UNA	Duke Frasco	28,727	68.29
BAKUD	Jimmy Maglasang	13,137	31.23
Independent	Benny Sarmiento	205	0.49
Total votes		44,332	100.00
UNA hold			

==== Pilar ====
Jet Fernandez is the incumbent.

Pilar mayoralty election
Party	Candidate	Votes	%
BAKUD	Jet Fernandez	3,865	53.80
1-Cebu	Mel Tajo	3,319	46.20
Total votes		7,421	100.00

==== Poro ====
Incumbent Luciano Rama, Jr. is running for his reelection unopposed.

Poro mayoralty election
Party	Candidate	Votes	%
BAKUD	Luciano Rama, Jr.	8,950	100.00
Total votes		11,099	100.00

==== San Francisco ====
Incumbent Aly Arquilano is running for his reelection unopposed.

San Francisco mayoralty election
Party	Candidate	Votes	%
BAKUD	Aly Arquilano	13,986	100.00
Total votes		19,299	100.00

==== Sogod ====
Moonyeen Durano is the incumbent.

Sogod mayoralty election
Party	Candidate	Votes	%
BAKUD	Moonyeen Durano	12,225	72.46
UNA	Nicasio Bacayo	4,647	27.54
Total votes		17,903	100.00

==== Tudela ====
Erwin Yu is the incumbent.

Tudela mayoralty election
Party	Candidate	Votes	%
BAKUD	Erwin Yu	3,848	56.98
1-Cebu	Loret Maratas	2,715	40.20
PMP	Rogelio Baquerfo	190	2.81
Total votes		6,917	100.00

=== 6th District, Mayoral Election ===
- City: Mandaue City
- Municipalities: Consolacion, Cordova

==== Mandaue City ====
Jonas Cortes is the incumbent.

Mandaue City mayoralty election
Party	Candidate	Votes	%
Liberal	Jonas Cortes	99,406	77.99
Bagumbayan	Vic Biaño	28,062	22.01
Total votes		138,240	100.00

==== Consolacion ====
Teresa Alegado is the incumbent.

Consolacion mayoralty election
Party	Candidate	Votes	%
Liberal	Teresa Alegado	27,220	53.23
1-Cebu	Avelino Guingob, Sr.	23,917	46.77
Total votes		53,137	100.00

==== Cordova ====
Adelino Sitoy is the incumbent.

Cordova mayoralty election
Party	Candidate	Votes	%
Liberal	Adelino Sitoy	13,399	61.88
1-Cebu	Dody Jumao-as	4,680	20.69
Independent	Johnson Tan, Jr.	3,943	17.43
Total votes		24,817	100.00

=== Cebu City Mayoral Election ===
Mike Rama is the incumbent. He faced off 2nd District Congressman Tomas Osmeña, who served as mayor from 2001 until 2010. He is the brother of Senator Serge Osmeña and grandson of former president Sergio Osmeña Sr.

Cebu City mayoralty election
Party	Candidate	Votes	%
UNA	Mike Rama	215,425	50.70
Liberal	Tomas Osmeña	209,497	49.30
Total votes		439,400	100.00
UNA hold			

=== Lapu-Lapu City Mayoral Election ===
Paz Radaza is the incumbent. She faced Liberal Party bet Jun Pelaez.

Lapu-Lapu City mayoralty election
Party	Candidate	Votes	%
PDP–Laban	Paz Radaza	62,044	52.95
Liberal	Jun Pelaez	52,564	44.86
Independent	Kwin Cabahug	2,568	2.19
Total votes		126,862	100.00
PDP–Laban hold			
