= 2010 Cebu local elections =

Local election in Cebu, Philippines

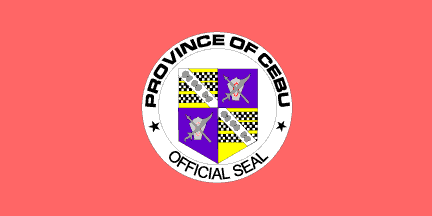
- May 10, 2010
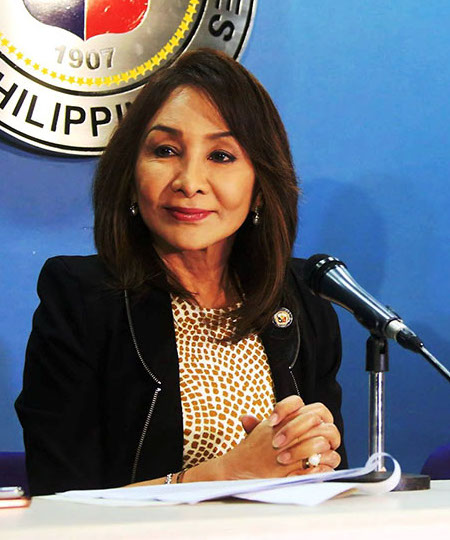

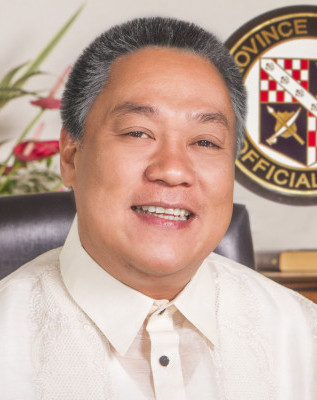
Nominee	Gwendolyn Garcia	Hilario Davide III
Party	Lakas–Kampi	Liberal
Running mate	Glenn Soco	Gregorio Sanchez
Popular vote	639,587	543,246
Percentage	53.50	45.44
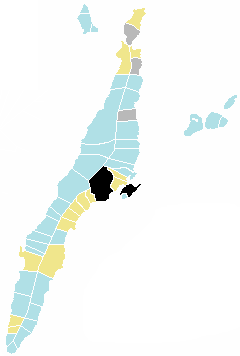
- The candidate with the highest number of votes within each municipality for the gubernatorial election. Cebu City and Lapu-Lapu City do not vote for provincial officials.
Governor before election
Gwendolyn Garcia
Lakas–Kampi
Elected Governor
Gwendolyn Garcia
Lakas–Kampi

Local elections were held in the province of Cebu on May 10, 2010 within the Philippine general election. The voters elected a mayor, vice mayor, nine district representatives (including two from Cebu City and the newly formed lone district of Lapu-Lapu City, and town and city councilors as well as two provincial board members came from six provincial districts.

== Gubernatorial and vice gubernatorial election ==
Cebu gubernatorial election
Party	Candidate	Votes	%
Lakas–Kampi	Gwendolyn Garcia	639,587	53.50
Liberal	Hilario Davide III	543,246	45.44
PGRP	Godofredo Berizo	7,757	0.65
Independent	Rafael Ajoc	4,806	0.40
Total votes		1,365,975	100.00
Lakas–Kampi hold			

Cebu vice gubernatorial election
Party	Candidate	Votes	%
Liberal	Gregorio Sanchez	543,924	50.81
Lakas–Kampi	Glenn Soco	517,687	48.36
PGRP	Eladia Balicoco	8,959	0.84
Liberal gain from Lakas–Kampi			

== Congressional elections ==
Each of Cebu's six and three other legislative districts will elect each representative to the House of Representatives. The candidate with the highest number of votes wins the seat.

=== 1st District ===
Incumbent Eduardo Gullas is also supported by Lakas-Kampi-CMD and its affiliate One Cebu.

Philippine House of Representatives election at Cebu's 1st district
Party	Candidate	Votes	%
Nacionalista	Eduardo Gullas	209,208	80.40
PMP	Luna Sabalones	10,527	4.05
Independent	Felipe Concepcion	5,449	2.09
Valid ballots		225,184	86.54
Invalid or blank votes		35,039	13.46
Total votes		260,223	100.00
Nacionalista hold			

=== 2nd District ===
Pablo Garcia is the incumbent.

Philippine House of Representatives election at Cebu's 2nd district
Party	Candidate	Votes	%
Lakas–Kampi	Pablo Garcia	117,670	55.07
Liberal	Cora-Lou Kintanar	61,597	28.83
Valid ballots		179,267	83.90
Invalid or blank votes		34,396	16.10
Total votes		213,663	100.00
Lakas–Kampi hold			

=== 3rd District ===
Pablo John Garcia is the incumbent.

Philippine House of Representatives election at Cebu's 3rd district
Party	Candidate	Votes	%
Lakas–Kampi	Pablo John Garcia	127,730	55.09
Liberal	Antonio Yapha	79,604	34.34
Valid ballots		207,334	89.43
Invalid or blank votes		24,496	10.57
Total votes		231,830	100.00
Lakas–Kampi hold			

=== 4th District ===
Celestino Martinez III is the pending incumbent after Benhur Salimbangon was unseated by the Supreme Court due to poll fraud. The case is under a motion for reconsideration. Martinez may not be seated until the last week of January as Congress will adjourn for election-campaigning.

Philippine House of Representatives election at Cebu's 4th district
Party	Candidate	Votes	%
Lakas–Kampi	Benhur Salimbangon	137,324	67.48
Liberal	Celestino Martinez III	66,165	32.52
Valid ballots		203,334	93.76
Invalid or blank votes		13,549	6.24
Total votes		217,038	100.00
Lakas–Kampi hold			

=== 5th District ===
Incumbent Ramon Durano VI is also co-nominated by One Cebu and Lakas-Kampi-CMD.

Philippine House of Representatives election at Cebu's 5th district
Party	Candidate	Votes	%
NPC	Ramon Durano VI	163,874	78.66
Liberal	Jesus Durano Jr.	24,441	11.73
PMP	Gilbert Wagas	16,057	7.71
Independent	Adonis Montecillo	3,951	1.90
Valid ballots		208,323	86.27
Invalid or blank votes		33,156	13.73
Total votes		241,479	100.00
NPC hold			

=== 6th District ===
Incumbent Nerissa Soon-Ruiz switched from the Lakas-Kampi-CMD to the Nacionalista Party on March 29, 2010. She is in her third consecutive term already and is ineligible for reelection. She will instead run for Mayor of Mandaue City. Lakas-Kampi-CMD and One Cebu nominated Luigi Quisumbing as their candidate in this district.

Philippine House of Representatives election at Cebu's 6th district
Party	Candidate	Votes	%
Lakas–Kampi	Luigi Quisumbing	113,996	61.70
Liberal	Ariston Cortes III	54,979	29.76
Independent	Victor Biaño	15,770	8.54
Total votes		201,742	100.00
Lakas–Kampi gain from Nacionalista			

=== Cebu City ===
==== 1st District ====
Incumbent Raul del Mar (Liberal) is in third consecutive term already and is ineligible for reelection. His daughter, Rachel is his party's nominee as well its affiliate Bando Osmeña – Pundok Kauswagan.

Philippine House of Representatives election at Cebu City's 1st district
Party	Candidate	Votes	%
Liberal	Rachel del Mar	98,501	58.49
Kusug	Mary Ann delos Santos	58,492	34.73
PGRP	Jacinto del Mar	5,555	3.30
Independent	Isabelo Osmeña Sr.	2,405	1.43
Independent	Francisco Acedillo	2,052	1.22
Independent	Florencio Villarin	1,082	0.64
Independent	Juan Arenasa	179	0.11
Independent	Miguel Selim	151	0.09
Valid ballots		168,417	94.16
Invalid or blank votes		10,442	5.84
Total votes		178,859	100.00
Liberal hold			

==== 2nd District ====
Incumbent Antonio Cuenco is in third consecutive term already and is ineligible for reelection. He was appointed as Secretary-General of the ASEAN Inter-Parliamentary Assembly (AIPA) on February 4, 2010. Two of his three parties, Lakas-Kampi-CMD and the Probinsya Muna Development Initiative (PROMDI) did not nominate a candidate to run in this district. However, the Kugi Uswag Sugbo (Kusug) nominated businessman Jonathan Guardo as their candidate which is affiliated with the Nacionalista Party.

Cebu City mayor Tomas Osmeña, who is in his third consecutive as mayor and is ineligible for reelection as mayor, is running for Congress under the Liberal Party and its affiliate Bando Osmeña – Pundok Kauswagan.

Philippine House of Representatives election at Cebu City's 2nd district
Party	Candidate	Votes	%
Liberal	Tomas Osmeña	125,575	64.44
Kusug	Jonathan Guardo	67,652	34.72
Independent	Makilito Mahinay	600	0.31
Independent	Edgar Abadiano	593	0.30
Independent	Lea Ong	457	0.23
Valid ballots		194,877	95.65
Invalid or blank votes		12,752	4.35
Total votes		203,731	100.00
Liberal gain from Lakas–Kampi			

=== Lapu-Lapu City ===
Lapu-Lapu City is going to elect their first congressman this election. They were formerly included in Cebu's 6th district.

Philippine House of Representatives election at Lapu-Lapu City
Party	Candidate	Votes	%
Lakas–Kampi	Arturo Radaza	70,125	56.33
NPC	Joselito Ruiz	33,100	26.59
Liberal	Eugene Espedido	20,809	16.71
Independent	Rolando Lejarde	461	0.37
Valid ballots		124,495	92.46
Invalid or blank votes		10,158	7.54
Total votes		134,653	100.00
Lakas–Kampi win (new seat)			

== Provincial Board elections ==
=== 1st District ===
- City: Carcar, Naga City, Talisay City
- Municipalities: Minglanilla, San Fernando, Sibonga

Cebu 1st District Sangguniang Panlalawigan election
Party	Candidate	Votes	%
Lakas–Kampi	Julian Daan	156,341	42.08
Nacionalista	Sergio Restauro	63,458	17.08
Independent	Juan Bolo	55,275	14.88
Liberal	Johnny delos Reyes	43,855	11.80
Liberal	Delhia Tiu	38,677	10.41
Independent	Eduardo Adlawan	13,948	3.75
Total votes		371,554	100.00

=== 2nd District ===
- Municipalities: Alcantara, Alcoy, Alegria, Argao, Badian, Boljoon, Dalaguete, Dumanjug, Ginatilan, Malabuyoc, Moalboal, Oslob, Ronda, Samboan, Santander

Cebu 2nd District Sangguniang Panlalawigan election
Party	Candidate	Votes	%
Lakas–Kampi	Peter John Calderon	83,870	29.55
Lakas–Kampi	Wilfredo Caminero	77,778	27.40
Liberal	Carmiano Kintanar	52,013	18.33
Liberal	Orvi Ortega	51,102	18.00
Independent	Oliveros Kintanar	19,071	6.72
Total votes		283,834	100.00

=== 3rd District ===
- City: Toledo City
- Municipalities: Aloguinsan, Asturias, Balamban, Barili, Pinamungajan, Tuburan,

Cebu 3rd District Sangguniang Panlalawigan election
Party	Candidate	Votes	%
Lakas–Kampi	Caesar Ian Zambo	95,525	27.50
Lakas–Kampi	Alex Binghay	92,508	26.63
Liberal	Victoria Corominas	92,289	26.57
Liberal	Estrella Yapha	64,464	18.56
Independent	Richard Alfajora	2,557	0.74
Total votes		347,343	100.00

=== 4th District ===
- City: Bogo
- Municipalities: Bantayan, Daanbantayan, Madridejos, Medellin, San Remigio, Santa Fe, Tabogon, Tabuelan

Cebu 4th District Sangguniang Panlalawigan election
Party	Candidate	Votes	%
Lakas–Kampi	Sun Shimura	90,548	29.08
Lakas–Kampi	Joven Mondigo Jr.	88,340	28.37
Liberal	Mariano Martinez	74,986	24.08
Liberal	Jose de Leon Jr.	55,379	17.78
Independent	Juanito Escala	2,141	0.69
Total votes		311,394	100.00

=== 5th District ===
- City: Danao
- Municipalities: Borbon, Carmen, Catmon, Compostela, Liloan, Pilar, Poro, San Francisco, Sogod, Tudela

Cebu 5th District Sangguniang Panlalawigan election
Party	Candidate	Votes	%
BAKUD	Agnes Magpale	148,317	46.76
BAKUD	Jude Thaddeus Sybico	103,099	32.50
Liberal	Jose Jimini Lao	18,525	5.84
PMP	Luis Reyes Jr.	15,556	4.90
PMP	Doris Arquillano	13,782	4.35
Liberal	Joseph Malaluan	13,606	4.29
PGRP	Joel Solon	4,306	1.36
Total votes		317,191	100.00

=== 6th District ===
- City: Mandaue City
- Municipalities: Consolacion, Cordova

Cebu 5th District Sangguniang Panlalawigan election
Party	Candidate	Votes	%
1-Cebu	Teddy Ouano	81,575	27.88
Liberal	Arleigh Sitoy	66,746	22.81
Liberal	Edmund Sanchez	52,716	18.01
Lakas–Kampi	Wenceslao Gakit	46,763	15.98
Independent	Elmer Cabahug	44,836	15.32
Total votes		292,636	100.00

== City and Municipal elections ==
=== 1st District, Mayoral election ===
- City: Carcar, Naga City, Talisay City
- Municipalities: Minglanilla, San Fernando, Sibonga

==== Carcar ====
Carcar mayoralty election
Party	Candidate	Votes	%
Lakas–Kampi	Nicepuro Apura	22,235	51.03
Nacionalista	Nestor Velez	21,339	48.97
Total votes		43,574	100.00
Lakas–Kampi gain from Nacionalista			

==== Naga City ====
Naga City mayoralty election
Party	Candidate	Votes	%
Nacionalista	Valdemar Chiong	32,280	78.40
Liberal	Espiridon Cañoneo	8,413	20.43
PMP	Leandro Patalinghug	361	0.88
Independent	Dominador Basaya Jr.	117	0.28
Total votes		41,171	100.00
Nacionalista hold			

==== Talisay City ====
Talisay City mayoralty election
Party	Candidate	Votes	%
Nacionalista	Socrates Fernandez	43,164	58.02
Liberal	Raul Bacaltos	30,633	41.17
Independent	Ruperto Abapo	602	0.81
Total votes		74,399	100.00
Nacionalista hold			

==== Minglanilla ====
Minglanilla mayoralty election
Party	Candidate	Votes	%
Nacionalista	Eduardo Maria Selma	30,491	88.20
Liberal	Romulo Cañizares	4,079	11.80
Total votes		34,570	100.00
Nacionalista hold			

==== San Fernando ====
San Fernando mayoralty election
Party	Candidate	Votes	%
Liberal	Antonio Canoy	15,329	52.02
Nacionalista	Lakambini Reluya	14,055	47.70
PMP	Teodulfo Cañas Jr.	43	0.15
Independent	Ponciano Bacalso	40	0.14
Total votes		29,467	100.00
Liberal gain from Nacionalista			

==== Sibonga ====
Sibonga mayoralty election
Party	Candidate	Votes	%
Nacionalista	Lionel Bacaltos	12,363	53.82
Lakas–Kampi	Nestor Ponce	10,560	45.97
PMP	Eutiquio Villacura Jr.	47	0.20
Total votes		22,970	100.00
Nacionalista hold			

=== 2nd District, Mayoral Election ===
- Municipalities: Alcantara, Alcoy, Alegria, Argao, Badian, Boljoon, Dalaguete, Dumanjug, Ginatilan, Malabuyoc, Moalboal, Oslob, Ronda, Samboan, Santander

==== Alcantara ====
Alcantara mayoralty election
Party	Candidate	Votes	%
Lakas–Kampi	Prudencio Barino Jr.	4,494	77.41
Liberal	Roberto Pulgo Jr.	1,457	22.59
Total votes		5,951	100.00
Lakas–Kampi hold			

==== Alcoy ====
Alcoy mayoralty election
Party	Candidate	Votes	%
Lakas–Kampi	Nicomedes delos Santos	5,811	89.76
Liberal	Jacinto Antig	663	10.24
Total votes		6,474	100.00
Lakas–Kampi hold			

==== Alegria ====
Alcoy mayoralty election
Party	Candidate	Votes	%
Lakas–Kampi	Emelita Guisadio	5,683	50.18
1-Cebu	Verna Magallon	5,609	49.53
Independent	Emmanuel Aller Sr.	33	0.29
Total votes		11,325	100.00
Lakas–Kampi hold			

==== Argao ====
Argao mayoralty election
Party	Candidate	Votes	%
Lakas–Kampi	Edsel Galeos	27,240	89.67
PMP	Alfredo Lanticse	3,139	10.33
Total votes		30,379	100.00
Lakas–Kampi hold			

==== Badian ====
Badian mayoralty election
Party	Candidate	Votes	%
1-Cebu	Robburt Librando	14,916	87.55
Liberal	Aspo Agravante	2,122	12.45
Total votes		17,038	100.00
1-Cebu hold			

==== Boljoon ====
Boljoon mayoralty election
Party	Candidate	Votes	%
1-Cebu	Teresita Celis	4,748	64.06
Liberal	Feliberta Mubarak Obaid	2,604	35.13
Independent	Suprema Trinidad	60	0.81
Total votes		7,412	100.00
1-Cebu hold			

==== Dalaguete ====
Dalaguete mayoralty election
Party	Candidate	Votes	%
Lakas–Kampi	Ronald Allan Cesante	16,077	58.26
1-Cebu	Andrade Alcantara	11,114	40.28
Independent	Maximo Elemino	216	0.78
PMP	Themestocles Caritan	187	0.68
Total votes		27,594	100.00
Lakas–Kampi gain from 1-Cebu			

==== Dumanjug ====
Dumanjug mayoralty election
Party	Candidate	Votes	%
Lakas–Kampi	Nelson Garcia	12,805	58.74
Liberal	Efren Guntrano Gica	8,993	41.26
Total votes		21,698	100.00
Lakas–Kampi gain from Liberal			

==== Ginatilan ====
Ginatilan mayoralty election
Party	Candidate	Votes	%
Lakas–Kampi	Antonio Singco	4,175	51.02
Liberal	Maria Fema Duterte	3,976	48.59
Independent	Jaime Lim	32	0.39
Total votes		8,183	100.00
Lakas–Kampi hold			

==== Malabuyoc ====
Malabuyoc mayoralty election
Party	Candidate	Votes	%
Lakas–Kampi	Daisy Creus	5,761	72.08
Liberal	Bernardo Rivas	2,231	27.92
Total votes		7,992	100.00
Lakas–Kampi hold			

==== Moalboal ====
Moalboal mayoralty election
Party	Candidate	Votes	%
Lakas–Kampi	Inocentes Cabaron	8,978	63.01
Liberal	Felix Pocong Jr.	5,271	36.99
Total votes		14,249	100.00
Lakas–Kampi hold			

==== Oslob ====
Oslob mayoralty election
Party	Candidate	Votes	%
Lakas–Kampi	Ronald Guaren	5,631	47.81
Independent	Estrellita Derama	2,528	21.47
Liberal	Jose Dodjie Abines	2,032	17.25
Nacionalista	Apolonio Abines III	1,586	13.47
Total votes		11,777	100.00
Lakas–Kampi hold			

==== Ronda ====
Ronda mayoralty election
Party	Candidate	Votes	%
Lakas–Kampi	Mariano Blanco III	7,107	63.04
Liberal	Dailinda Villanueva	4,166	36.96
Total votes		11,273	100.00
Lakas–Kampi hold			

==== Samboan ====
Samboan mayoralty election
Party	Candidate	Votes	%
Lakas–Kampi	Raymond Joseph Calderon	8,087	100.00
Total votes		8,087	100.00
Lakas–Kampi hold			

==== Santander ====
Santander mayoralty election
Party	Candidate	Votes	%
Lakas–Kampi	Marilyn Wenceslao	6,393	81.56
Liberal	Mateo Pelesco	1,402	17.89
Independent	Franklin Busmion	43	0.55
Total votes		7,838	100.00
Lakas–Kampi hold			

=== 3rd District, Mayoral Election ===
- City: Toledo City
- Municipalities: Aloguinsan, Asturias, Balamban, Barili, Pinamungajan, Tuburan

==== Toledo City ====
Toledo City mayoralty election
Party	Candidate	Votes	%
Lakas–Kampi	Aurelio Espinosa	45,594	70.63
Independent	Ricardo Rafols Jr.	9,943	15.40
Liberal	Teresito Largo	9,015	13.97
Total votes		64,552	100.00
Lakas–Kampi hold			

==== Aloguinsan ====
Aloguinsan mayoralty election
Party	Candidate	Votes	%
Lakas–Kampi	Augustus Moreno	8,128	60.81
Liberal	Carlito Chua	4,996	37.38
Independent	Gregorio Dealagdon	232	1.74
Independent	Ivy Rebecca Pantin	10	0.07
Total votes		13,366	100.00
Lakas–Kampi hold			

==== Asturias ====
Asturias mayoralty election
Party	Candidate	Votes	%
Lakas–Kampi	Alan Adlawan	13,661	61.32
Liberal	Letezia Orozco	8,617	38.68
Total votes		22,278	100.00
Lakas–Kampi hold			

==== Balamban ====
Balamban mayoralty election
Party	Candidate	Votes	%
Lakas–Kampi	Ace Stefan Binghay	24,461	84.82
Liberal	Wilfredo Lleno	4,379	15.18
Total votes		28,840	100.00
Lakas–Kampi hold			

==== Barili ====
Barili mayoralty election
Party	Candidate	Votes	%
Lakas–Kampi	Teresito Mariñas	21,719	70.59
Nacionalista	Ramon Ewican	7,172	23.31
Liberal	Tito Torres	1,615	5.25
Independent	Feliciano Arias	165	0.54
Independent	Julius Antonio Pasculado	96	0.31
Total votes		30,767	100.00
Lakas–Kampi hold			

==== Pinamungajan ====
Pinamungajan mayoralty election
Party	Candidate	Votes	%
Liberal	Geraldine Yapha	14,215	53.28
1-Cebu	Glenn Baricuatro	12,467	46.72
Total votes		26,682	100.00
Liberal hold			

==== Tuburan ====
Tuburan mayoralty election
Party	Candidate	Votes	%
Liberal	Democrito Diamante	16,270	53.75
Lakas–Kampi	Rose Marie Suezo	13,806	45.61
Independent	Buenaventura Diamante	194	0.64
Total votes		30,270	100.00
Liberal gain from Lakas–Kampi			

=== 4th District, Mayoral Election ===
- City: Bogo
- Municipalities: Bantayan, Daanbantayan, Madridejos, Medellin, San Remigio, Santa Fe, Tabogon, Tabuelan

==== Bogo ====
Bogo mayoralty election
Party	Candidate	Votes	%
Liberal	Celestino Martinez Jr.	21,086	58.40
Lakas–Kampi	Mariquita Yeung	15,018	41.60
Total votes		36,104	100.00
Liberal hold			

==== Bantayan ====
Bantayan mayoralty election
Party	Candidate	Votes	%
Lakas–Kampi	Ian Christopher Escario	16,303	58.62
Independent	Orlando Layese	7,018	25.24
Liberal	Susan Pacheco	4,489	16.14
Total votes		27,810	100.00
Lakas–Kampi hold			

==== Daanbantayan ====
Daanbantayan mayoralty election
Party	Candidate	Votes	%
Lakas–Kampi	Maria Luisa Loot	21,194	59.83
Liberal	Augusto Corro	14,231	40.17
Total votes		35,425	100.00
Lakas–Kampi hold			

==== Madridejos ====
Madridejos mayoralty election
Party	Candidate	Votes	%
Lakas–Kampi	Salvador dela Fuente	8,607	58.40
Liberal	Doroteo Salazar	6,132	41.60
Total votes		14,739	100.00
Lakas–Kampi hold			

==== Medellin ====
Medellin mayoralty election
Party	Candidate	Votes	%
Lakas–Kampi	Ricardo Ramirez	18,149	100
Total votes		18,149	100
Lakas–Kampi hold			

==== San Remigio ====
San Remigio mayoralty election
Party	Candidate	Votes	%
Lakas–Kampi	Jay Olivar	14,180	54.41
Liberal	Herman Antonio Bascon	11,239	43.13
PMP	Virgilio Capuno	642	2.46
Total votes		26,061	100.00
Lakas–Kampi gain from Liberal			

==== Santa Fe ====
Santa Fe mayoralty election
Party	Candidate	Votes	%
Liberal	Jennifer Ilustrisimo	6,999	59.17
Lakas–Kampi	Adoracion Cabrera	4,789	40.49
PMP	Cleopatra Cataluña	41	0.35
Total votes		11,829	100.00
Liberal hold			

==== Tabogon ====
Tabogon mayoralty election
Party	Candidate	Votes	%
Liberal	Eusebio Dungog	9,405	100.00
Total votes		9,405	100.00
Liberal hold			

==== Tabuelan ====
Tabuelan mayoralty election
Party	Candidate	Votes	%
Lakas–Kampi	Rex Casiano Gerona	6,862	50.73
Nacionalista	Raul Gerona	5,619	41.54
Liberal	Zito Gallo	1,045	7.73
Total votes		13,526	100.00
Lakas–Kampi hold			

=== 5th District, Mayoral Election ===
- City: Danao
- Municipalities: Borbon, Carmen, Catmon, Compostela, Liloan, Pilar, Poro, San Francisco, Sogod, Tudela

==== Danao ====
Danao mayoralty election
Party	Candidate	Votes	%
BAKUD	Ramon Durano Jr.	34,596	62.42
Liberal	Jesus Durano	20,829	37.58
Total votes		55,425	100.00
BAKUD hold			

==== Borbon ====
Borbon mayoralty election
Party	Candidate	Votes	%
BAKUD	Bernard Sepulveda	11,509	76.03
PMP	Abdon Cabahug	3,628	23.97
Total votes		15,137	100.00
BAKUD hold			

==== Carmen ====
Carmen mayoralty election
Party	Candidate	Votes	%
BAKUD	Martin Gerard Villamor	17,276	66.27
PMP	Sonia Pua	6,104	23.41
Nacionalista	Amytis Batao	2,690	10.32
Total votes		26,070	100.00
BAKUD hold			

==== Catmon ====
Catmon mayoralty election
Party	Candidate	Votes	%
BAKUD	Dan Jusay	8,626	65.22
PMP	Edwin Aroma	4,599	34.78
Total votes		13,225	100.00
BAKUD hold			

==== Compostela ====
Compostela mayoralty election
Party	Candidate	Votes	%
BAKUD	Joel Quiño	11,719	55.65
PMP	Ritchie Wagas	9,338	44.35
Total votes		21,057	100.00
BAKUD gain from PMP			

==== Liloan ====
Liloan mayoralty election
Party	Candidate	Votes	%
Liberal	Duke Frasco	31,720	100.00
Total votes		31,720	100.00
Liberal hold			

==== Pilar ====
Pilar mayoralty election
Party	Candidate	Votes	%
BAKUD	Jesus Fernandez Jr.	4,416	57.51
Nacionalista	Rommel Tajo	3,263	42.49
Total votes		7,679	100.00
BAKUD hold			

==== Poro ====
Poro mayoralty election
Party	Candidate	Votes	%
BAKUD	Luciano Rama Jr.	7,291	59.96
Nacionalista	Fernando Otadoy	4,869	40.04
Total votes		12,160	100.00
BAKUD hold			

==== San Francisco ====
San Francisco mayoralty election
Party	Candidate	Votes	%
BAKUD	Aly Arquillano	12,753	74.25
Nacionalista	Glenn Basil Montenegro	4,040	23.52
PMP	Andrew Arquillano	382	2.22
Total votes		17,175	100.00
BAKUD hold			

==== Sogod ====
Sogod mayoralty election
Party	Candidate	Votes	%
BAKUD	Lissa Marie Durano	12,343	78.07
PMP	Axienas Montecillo	3,467	21.93
Total votes		15,810	100.00
BAKUD hold			

==== Tudela ====
Tudela mayoralty election
Party	Candidate	Votes	%
BAKUD	Erwin Yu	3,328	51.03
PMP	Rogelio Baquerfo	3,016	46.24
Liberal	Cristine Solante	178	2.73
Total votes		6,522	100.00
BAKUD gain from PMP			

=== 6th District, Mayoral Election ===
- City: Mandaue City
- Municipalities: Consolacion, Cordova

==== Mandaue City ====
Mandaue City mayoralty election
Party	Candidate	Votes	%
Independent	Jonas Cortes	77,082	59.54
Nacionalista	Nerissa Soon-Ruiz (Note: Originally ran under Lakas–Kampi–CMD; resigned from the party mid-way through the campaign. Still labeled as a Lakas candidate on the official ballots.)	49,815	38.48
Independent	Eugenio Ruiz	2,557	1.98
Total votes		129,454	100.00
Independent hold			

==== Consolacion ====
Consolacion mayoralty election
Party	Candidate	Votes	%
Liberal	Teresa Alegado	20,365	45.01
NPC	Arnolfo Aurelio Abinales	9,305	20.56
Nacionalista	Ember Alinsug	8,770	19.38
1-Cebu	Victor Maambong	6,361	14.06
PMP	Jerson Marantilde	449	0.99
Total votes		45,250	100.00
Liberal gain from NPC			

==== Cordova ====
Cordova mayoralty election
Party	Candidate	Votes	%
Lakas–Kampi	Adelino Sitoy	16,110	100.00
Total votes		16,110	100.00
Lakas–Kampi hold			

=== Cebu City Mayoral Election ===
Cebu City mayoral election
Party	Candidate	Votes	%
Liberal	Michael Rama	210,520	58.42
Nacionalista	Alvin Garcia	120,327	33.39
Lakas–Kampi	Georgia Osmeña	16,620	4.61
Independent	John Henry Osmeña	8,178	2.27
PGRP	Salvador Solima	1,867	0.52
Independent	Crisologo Saavedra	1,171	0.32
Independent	Rodolfo Laconza	471	0.13
Independent	Cristituto Abangan	437	0.12
Independent	Anastacio Dela Cruz	423	0.12
Independent	Fermiliano Dapitan	324	0.09
Total votes		360,338	100.00
Liberal hold			

=== Lapu-Lapu City Mayoral Election ===
Lapu-Lapu City mayoral election
Party	Candidate	Votes	%
Lakas–Kampi	Paz Radaza	70,392	54.22
NPC	Junard Chan	34,418	26.51
Independent	Isabelito Darnayla	14,168	10.91
Liberal	Efrain Pelaez Jr.	10,434	8.04
Independent	Virgilio Cano	403	0.31
Total votes		129,815	100.00
Lakas–Kampi hold			
