= Cebu Provincial Board =

Legislative body of the province of Cebu, Philippines

Cebu Provincial Board Sangguniang Panlalawigan ng Cebu
- 17th Sangguniang Panlalawigan ng Cebu
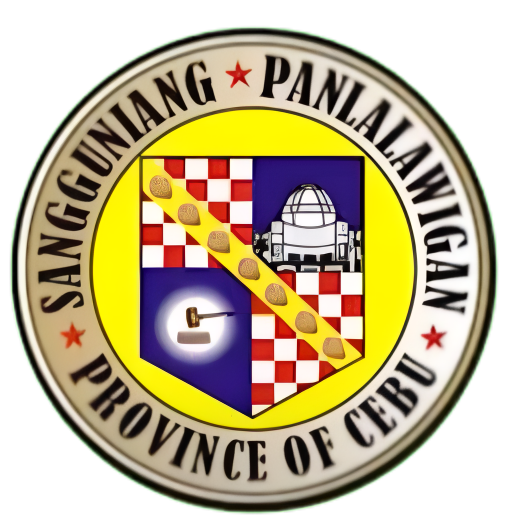
- Seal of the Provincial Board of Cebu

- Flag of the Province of Cebu

Type
- Type: Unicameral
- Term limits: 3 terms (9 years)

Leadership
- Vice Governor and Presiding Officer: Glenn Anthony O. Soco (1CEBU)
- Floor Leader: Andrei “Red” Duterte (1CEBU)
- Assistant Floor Leader: Kerrie Keanne Shimura (1CEBU)

Structure
- Seats: 18 board members (including 3 ex officio) members 1 ex officio presiding officer
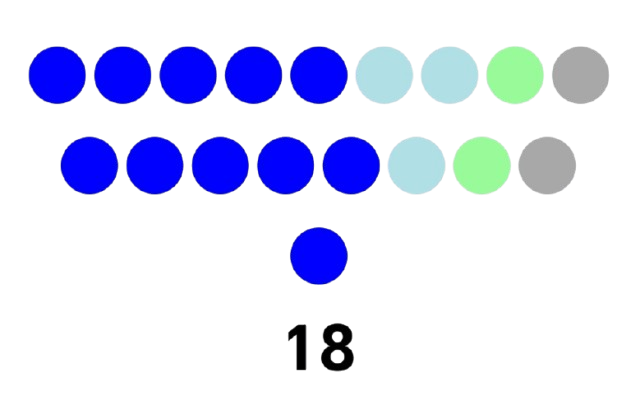
- Political groups: One Cebu (11) Lakas (3) Nacionalista (2) Nonpartisan (2)
- Length of term: 3 years
- Authority: Local Government Code of the Philippines

Elections
- Voting system: Multiple non-transferable vote (regular members); Indirect election (ex officio members)
- Last election: May 12, 2025
- Next election: May 8, 2028

Meeting place
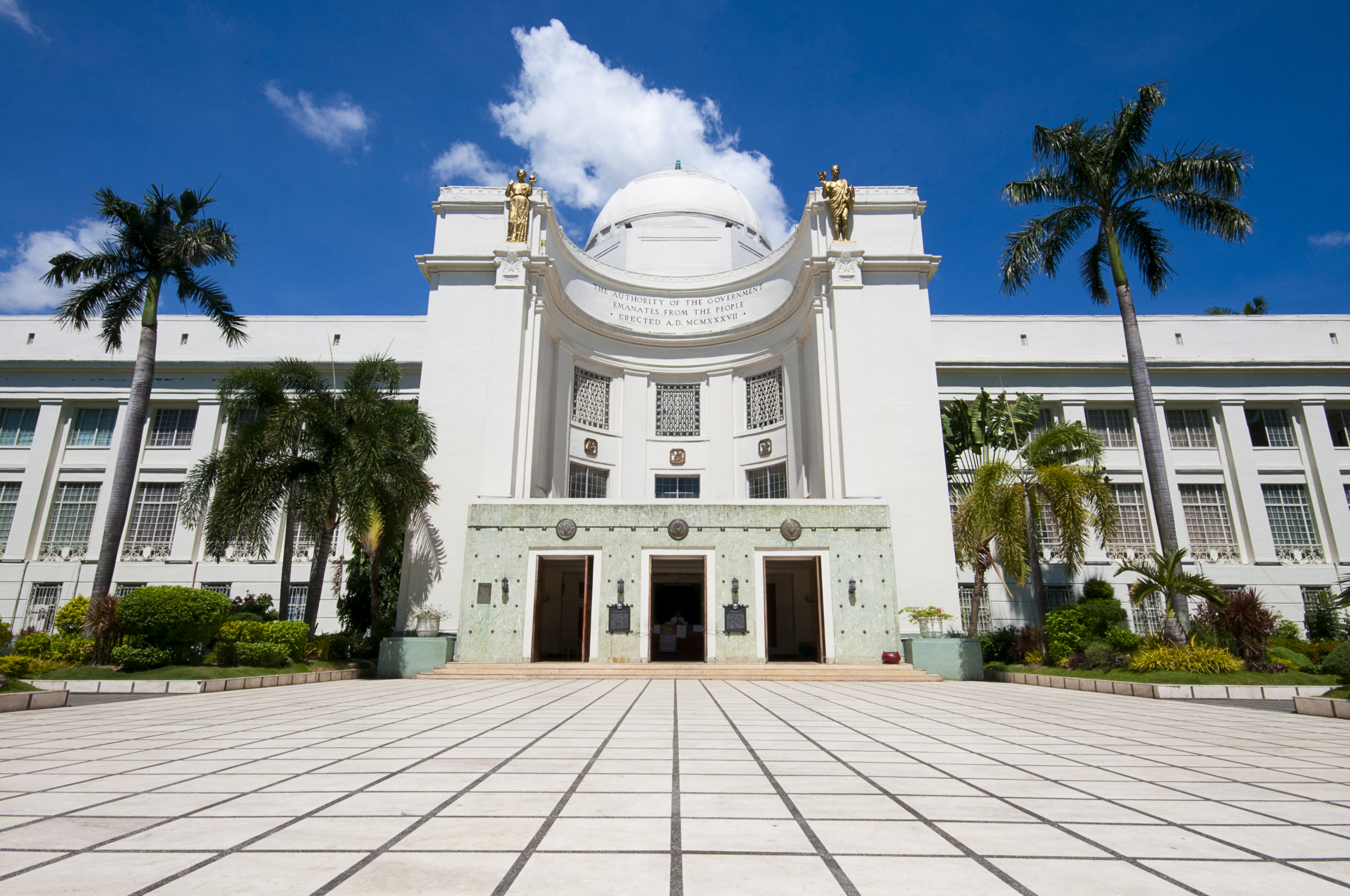
- Cebu Provincial Capitol, N. Escario St, corner Gov. M. Roa St, Capitol Site, Cebu City, 6000

The Cebu Provincial Board is the Sangguniang Panlalawigan (provincial legislature) of the Philippine province of Cebu.

The members are elected via plurality-at-large voting: the province is divided into seven districts, two representatives in each district. The candidates with the highest number of votes in each district, depending on the number of members the district sends, are elected. The vice governor is the ex officio presiding officer, and only votes to break ties. The vice governor is elected via the plurality voting system province-wide.

The districts used in appropriation of members is coextensive with the legislative districts of Cebu. In October 2024 a Supreme Court ruling ruled that Mandaue City shall elect their own Provincial Board members. This makes the total numbers of Provincial Board members to 19.

Aside from the regular members, the board also includes the provincial federation presidents of the Liga ng mga Barangay (LnB), the Sangguniang Kabataan (SK, youth councils) and the Philippine Councilors League (PCL).

== District apportionment ==
Elections	No. of seats per district								Ex officio seats	Total seats
Elections	1st	2nd	3rd	4th	5th	6th	7th	Mandaue at-large	Ex officio seats	Total seats
2001–2013	2	2	2	2	2	2	—	—	3	15
2016–2022	2	2	2	2	2	2	2	—	3	17
2025–present	2	2	2	2	2	2	2	2	3	19

== List of members ==
=== Current members ===
- Current Presiding Officer: Vice Governor Glenn Anthony O. Soco (1-Cebu)

Seat	Board member	Party	Start of term	End of term
Cebu's 1st district	Antonio Bacaltos Jr.	Nacionalista	June 30, 2025	June 30, 2028
Cebu's 1st district	Lakambini Reluya	Nacionalista	June 30, 2025	June 30, 2028
Cebu's 2nd district	Stanley Caminero	1CEBU	June 30, 2025	June 30, 2028
Cebu's 2nd district	Raymond Calderon	1CEBU	June 30, 2025	June 30, 2028
Cebu's 3rd district	Julius Anthony Corominas	1CEBU	June 30, 2025	June 30, 2028
Cebu's 3rd district	Dason Lorenz Lagon	Lakas	June 30, 2025	June 30, 2028
Cebu's 4th district	Kerrie Shimura	1CEBU	June 30, 2025	June 30, 2028
Cebu's 4th district	Nelson Mondigo	1CEBU	June 30, 2025	June 30, 2028
Cebu's 5th district	Andrei Duterte	1CEBU	June 30, 2025	June 30, 2028
Cebu's 5th district	Mike Villamor	1CEBU	June 30, 2025	June 30, 2028
Cebu's 6th district	Dason Larenz Lagon	1CEBU	June 30, 2025	June 30, 2028
Cebu's 6th district	Alfred Francis Ounao	Lakas	June 30, 2025	June 30, 2028
Cebu's 7th district	Cesar Baricuatro	1CEBU	June 30, 2025	June 30, 2028
Cebu's 7th district	Paz Rozgoni	1CEBU	June 30, 2025	June 30, 2028
Mandaue's lone district	Malcolm Sanchez	1CEBU	June 30, 2025	June 30, 2028
Mandaue's lone district	Nilo Seno	Lakas	June 30, 2025	June 30, 2028
ABC	Celestino Martinez III	Nonpartisan	August 12, 2024	TBD
PCL	Ricardo Pepito	1CEBU	August 12, 2022	TBD
SK	Loren Singco	Nonpartisan	December 11, 2023	TBD

=== Past members ===
This are the lists of past notable presiding officers, which is the Vice Governor and past Provincial Board members.

==== Vice Governor ====
Election year	Name	Party
1992	Apolonio A. Abines Jr.	
1995	Apolonio A. Abines Jr.	
1998	Fernando S. Celeste	
2001	John Gregory H. Osmeña Jr.	
2004	Gregorio G. Sanchez Jr.	(Independent-MASA)
2007	Gregorio G. Sanchez Jr.	1CEBU
2010	Gregorio G. Sanchez Jr.	Liberal
2010	Agnes A. Magpale	BAKUD
2013	Agnes A. Magpale	Liberal
2016	Agnes A. Magpale	Liberal
2019	Hilario Davide III	Liberal
2022	Hilario Davide III	Liberal
2025	Glenn Anthony O. Soco	1CEBU

==== 1st District ====
- City: Carcar, Naga, Talisay
- Municipalities: Minglanilla, San Fernando, Sibonga
- Population (2015): 709,660

Election year	Member (party)	Member (party)	Ref.
2001	Raul Bacaltos	Julian Daan	
2004	Raul Bacaltos (FND-MASA)	Juan Bolo (Independent-MASA)	
2007	Juan Bolo	Julian Daan	
2010	Julian Daan (Lakas–Kampi)	Sergio Restauro (Nacionalista)	
2013	Raul Alcoseba (Liberal)	Julian Daan (1-CEBU)	
2016	Raul Bacaltos (Independent)	Yolanda Daan (Nacionalista)	
2019	Yolanda L. Daan (Independent)	Raul D. Bacaltos (Independent)	
2022	Yolanda L. Daan (Nacionalista)	Raul D. Bacaltos (Nacionalista)	
2025	Antonio D. Bacaltos Jr. (Nacionalista)	Lakambini G. Reluya (Nacionalista)	

==== 2nd District ====
- Municipalities: Alcoy, Argao, Boljoon, Dalaguete, Oslob, Samboan, Santander
- Population (2015): 239,820

Election year	Member (party)	Member (party)	Ref.
2001	Antonio Almirante Jr.	Orvi Ortega	
2004	Antonio Almirante Jr. (NPC)	Carmiano Kintanar (NPC)	
2007	Peter John Calderon	Wilfredo Caminero	
2010	Peter John Calderon (Lakas–Kampi)	Wilfredo Caminero (Lakas–Kampi)	
2013	Christopher Baricuatro (Liberal)	Peter John Calderon (Liberal)	
2016	Edsel Galeos (Independent)	Jose Mari Salvador (Liberal)	
2019	Jose Mari D. Salvador (NPC)	Edsel A. Galeos (PDP-Laban)	
2022	Stanley S. Caminero (Independent)	Raymond Joseph D. Calderon (NUP)	
2025	Stanley S. Caminero (1-CEBU)	Raymond Joseph D. Calderon (1-CEBU)	

==== 3rd District ====
- City: Toledo
- Municipalities: Aloguinsan, Asturias, Balamban, Barili, Pinamungajan, Tuburan
- Population (2015): 541,152

Election year	Member (party)	Member (party)	Ref.
2001	Andres Corominas	Estrella Yapha	
2004	Victoria Corominas (Independent-MASA)	Estella Yapha (NPC)	
2007	Victoria Corominas	Caesar Ian Zambo	
2010	Alex Binghay (Lakas–Kampi)	Caesar Ian Zambo (Lakas–Kampi)	
2013	Alex Binghay (1-CEBU)	Grecilda Sanchez-Zaballero (Liberal)	
2016	Alex Binghay (Independent)	Victoria Corominas-Toribio (Independent)	
2019	Victoria C. Toribio (Independent)	John Ismael B. Borgonia (PDP-Laban)	
2022	John Ismael B. Borgonia (1-CEBU)	Victoria C. Toribio (Independent)	
2025	Julius Anthony G. Corominas (1-CEBU)	Dason Lorenz A. Lagon (1-CEBU)	

==== 4th District ====
- City: Bogo
- Municipalities: Bantayan, Daanbantayan, Madridejos, Medellin, San Remigio, Santa Fe, Tabogon, Tabuelan
- Population (2015): 484,198

Election year	Member (party)	Member (party)	Ref.
2001	Jose Maria Gastardo	Joven Mondigo	
2004	Jose Maria Gastardo (Independent)	Joven Mondigo (Independent)	
2007	Jose Maria Gastardo	Joven Mondigo Jr.	
2010	Joven Mondigo Jr. (Lakas–Kampi)	Sun Shimura (Lakas–Kampi)	
2013	Joven Mondigo Jr. (NUP)	Sun Shimura (NUP)	
2016	Horacio Paul Franco (Liberal)	Sun Shimura (NUP)	
2019	Kerrie Keane G. Shimura (NUP)	Horacio Paul V. Franco (Liberal)	
2022	Kerrie Keane G. Shimura (NUP)	Horacio Paul V. Franco (NUP)	
2025	Kerrie Keane G. Shimura (1-CEBU)	Nelson J. Mondigo (1-CEBU)	

==== 5th District ====
- City: Danao
- Municipalities: Borbon, Carmen, Catmon, Compostela, Liloan, Pilar, Poro, San Francisco, Sogod, Tudela
- Population (2015): 558,548

Election year	Member (party)	Member (party)	Ref.
2001	Josefina Patricia Asirit	Rosemarie Judy Durano	
2004	Rose Marie Durano (BAKUD)	Agnes Magpale (BAKUD)	
2007	Rose Marie Durano (BAKUD)	Agnes Magpale (BAKUD)	
2010	Agnes Magpale (BAKUD)	Jude Thaddeus Sybico (BAKUD)	
2010	Miguel Antonio Magpale (BAKUD)	Jude Thaddeus Sybico (BAKUD)	
2013	Miguel Antonio Magpale (BAKUD)	Jude Thaddeus Sybico (BAKUD)	
2016	Miguel Antonio Magpale (BAKUD)	Jude Thaddeus Sybico (BAKUD)	
2019	Andrei Duterte (1-CEBU)	Miguel Antonio A. Magpale (BAKUD)	
2022	Andrei Duterte (1-CEBU)	Michael Joseph T. Villamor (1-CEBU)	
2025	Andrei Duterte (1-CEBU)	Michael Joseph T. Villamor (1-CEBU)	

==== 6th District ====
- City: None
- Municipalities: Consolacion, Cordova
- Population (2015): 553,894

Election year	Member (party)	Member (party)	Ref.
2001	Victor Maambong	Manuel Masangkay	
2004	Victor Maambong (Lakas–Kampi)	Gabriel Luigi Quisumbing (Alayon-MASA)	
2007	Wenceslao Gakit	Victor Maambong	
2010	Thadeo Ouano (1-CEBU)	Arleigh Jay Sitoy (Liberal)	
2013	Thadeo Ouano (Liberal)	Arleigh Jay Sitoy (Liberal)	
2016	Glenn Bercede (Liberal)	Thadeo Jovito Ouano (1-CEBU)	
2019	Thadeo Jovito M. Ouano (PDP-Laban)	Glenn Anthony O. Soco (PDP-Laban)	
2022	Thadeo Jovito M. Ouano (PDP-Laban)	Glenn Anthony O. Soco (PDP-Laban)	
2025	Dason Larenz A. Lagon (1-CEBU)	Alfred Francis M. Ouano (Lakas)	

==== 7th District ====
- Municipalities: Alcantara, Alegria, Badian, Dumanjug, Ginatilan, Malabuyoc, Moalboal, Ronda
- Population (2015): 214,364

Election year	Member (party)	Member (party)	Ref.
2016	Christopher Baricuatro (Liberal)	Jerome Librando (Liberal)	
2019	Jerome Christian V. Librando (NPC)	Christopher R. Baricuatro (NPC)	
2022	Jerome Christian V. Librando (NPC)	Cesar A. Baricuatro (1-CEBU)	
2025	Paz A. Rozgoni (1-CEBU)	Cesar A. Baricuatro (1-CEBU)	

==== City of Mandaue Lone District ====
- City: Mandaue
- Population (2020): 364,116

Election year	Member (party)	Member (party)	Ref.
2025	Malcolm A. Sanchez (1-CEBU)	Nilo V. Seno (Lakas)	

==== Association of Barangay Captains President ====
Election year	Member	Ref.
2007	Teresita Celis	
2010	Jose Ribomapil Holganza Jr.	
2013	Celestino Martinez III	
2018	Celestino Martinez III	
2023	Celestino Martinez III	

==== Philippine Councilors League President ====
Election year	Member (party)	Ref.
2004	Alfred Francis Ouano (Consolacion)	
2007	Alfred Francis Ouano (Consolacion)	
2010	Carmen Remedios Durano-Meca (Danao) (BAKUD)	
2013	Carmen Remedios Durano-Meca (Danao) (BAKUD)	
2016	Earl Tidy Oyas (Catmon) (BAKUD)	
2019	Irving Gamallo (Samboan) (Note: Gamallo succeeded Earl Tidy Oyas after the latter was elected vice mayor of Catmon in the May 13 elections.) (NPC)	
2019	Francis Edward Salimbangon (Tabogon) (NUP)	
2022	Ricardo Pepito (Toledo City) (One Cebu)	
2025	Ricardo Pepito (Toledo City) (One Cebu)	

===== Sangguniang Kabataan Federation President =====
Election year	Member	Ref.
2007	Ramon Martin Calderon	
2010	Aladin Wilyamie Caminero	
2018	Jerico Rubio	
2023	Loren Singco	
