= Cebu Provincial Sports Complex =

Sports complex in Cebu City, Philippines

- Cebu Province Sports Complex
- Location in the Visayas Location in the Philippines
- Full name: Cebu Provincial Sports Complex
- Coordinates: 10°19′46″N 123°53′44″E
- Owner: Cebu Provincial Government
- Acreage: 2 hectares (4.9 acres)

Construction
- Groundbreaking: October 18, 2018
- Built: March 2018 (projected)
- Cost: ₱19.96 million
- Main contractors: Pragmatic Development and Construction Corp.

Tenant
- Cebu Provincial Sports Commission

The Cebu Provincial Sports Complex is a complex of sports facilities under construction in Lahug, Cebu City, Philippines.

== History ==
The groundbreaking for the sports complex took place on October 18, 2018 and was led by Cebu Governor Hilario Davide III. It is projected to be completed by March 11, 2019.

The sports complex project is implemented by the Cebu provincial government through its Provincial Engineering Office with the Pragmatic Development and Construction Corp. as its contractor. The construction costs ₱19.96 million.

== Facilities ==
The Cebu Provincial Sports Complex, which measures 36 x 60 meters, is situated on a one hectare lot in Sudlon, Barangay Lahug, Cebu City. It will host two standard-sized basketball courts which are convertible to accommodate other sports. The sports complex will also have a dedicated table tennis facility, a training center, and a weightlifting facility. An athlete's quarter is also planned to be added once the sports complex construction is completed.

== Tenants ==
The Cebu Provincial Sports Complex, as its name suggest is meant for use by athletes from Cebu province. It will also be used by the provincial government of Cebu as the venue for its annual province-wide sports meet. The venue will also be made available for rent for private use. It will also host the satellite office of the Cebu Provincial Sports Commission.
