= Julian Daan =

Cebuano actor, comedian, and politician

The Honourable Julian Bacus Daan

Member of the Cebu Provincial Board from the 1st District
- In office June 30, 1995 – June 30, 2004
- In office June 30, 2007 – June 30, 2016

Member of Talisay City Council
- In office June 30, 2016 – August 21, 2019
- In office June 30, 1987 – June 30, 1995

Personal details
- Born: February 15, 1945 Talisay, Cebu
- Died: August 21, 2019 (aged 74) Cebu City, Philippines
- Party: Nacionalista (2015–2019)
- Other political affiliations: One Cebu (2012–2015); Lakas–CMD (until 2012)
- Occupation: Politician, actor, comedian, writer, director

Julian Bacus Daan (February 15, 1945 – August 21, 2019), popularly known as Esteban "Teban" Escudero after a character he played in a radio drama, was a Filipino Cebuano film, local TV, stage, and radio writer, director, actor, comedian, and politician from Cebu, Philippines. He served six terms as member of the Cebu Provincial Board representing the first legislative district. He was serving his second term as councilman for Talisay City at the time of his death.

== Personal life ==
Daan came from a poor background and attained elementary education. He worked at the ship dock as a tally man and as a laborer in a beverage box-making company. He was married in 1969 to Yolanda Daan, also an elected provincial board member, and had two sons named Lester and Rodel.

== Career ==
=== Performing arts ===
After his shift from his job, he visited radio stations looking for work. Discovered by Marcos Navaro Sacol and Lou Arevalo, he starred in shows such as "Samuel Bilibid", "Ang Manok ni San Pedro", "Talpolano the Boxer," "Milyonaryong Mini", and "Goat the Wonderful". His programs were broadcast through DYRE, DYCB, DYLA, DYHP and Radio Mindanao Network radio stations in Cebuano-speaking provinces of Visayas and Mindanao.

Daan became popularly known as Esteban Escudero, a character he played in "Ang Manok ni San Pedro," a famous radio show in the 1970s. A rags-to-riches story of a man murdered by the family of a wealthy lady he was in love with but was resurrected and given a magical rooster by St. Peter, its popularity since it was first broadcast in 1976—at a time when the public listened to the radio for news and entertainment while the cost of acquiring a television was prohibitive—made him a household name. Originally written and directed by Marcos Navarro Sacol, it was a half-hour show aired daily except Sundays at 7:00 in the evening and over the years underwent several title changes: from the original "Ang Tawong Nakaadto sa Langit" to "Esteban Escudero" and finally "Ang Manok ni San Pedro." Daan later on replaced Sacol in writing the script and directing. When "Ang Manok ni San Pedro" was made into film in which he also starred and produced by siblings Rey and Domingo Arong with Jose Macachor as director, it became a commercial success upon its release in 1977 and was screened in theaters, festivals and local barangay events.

In 1980, he partnered with Allan "Golyat" Nacorda in the radio drama series, "Teban Loves Lorna." The comedic duo of Daan and Nacorda (Teban & Golyat) gained sustained mainstream popularity and they were invited to perform stage shows during fiestas and Christmas seasons. Their partnership lasted 39 years and produced the hits "Milyonaryong Mini" and "Goat the Wonderful," which were adapted into television series.

He was the station manager of DYHP RMN Cebu and also hosted the morning program, "Kung Ako ang Pasultihon" aired on DYHP with Priscilla Raganas with whom he had worked with since 1965. Among the shows he wrote were “Balentin ug Bulantoy,” “If I Know Pa Lamang, I Never Gayud,” “Inday Conching,” “Salvador del Mundo,” “Talpolano the Boxer,” “Teban, Bagduki Ko,” and “Teban Goes to America.”

=== Politics ===
His political career began when he was elected councilor for Tabunok, a barangay in the then-municipality of Talisay, in 1982. In 1987, he was voted to serve as member of Talisay Municipal Council.

In 1995, he won as member of the Cebu Provincial Board for the first legislative district and reelected to the same position twice in 1998 and 2001. He lost to Gregorio Sanchez Jr. in his bid for Vice Governor as the running-mate of Gwendolyn Garcia in 2004. He would serve three more consecutive terms as provincial board member for the same district from 2007 until 2016. Weeks after Vice Governor Sanchez' death on April 29, 2011, the provincial board recognized him as presiding Pro-Tempore after Agnes Magpale became acting governor, vacating the former position. He later became acting vice governor when Gwendolyn Garcia was suspended and Magpale became acting governor in 2012. However, he declined to take an oath to serve the office reportedly out of loyalty to his political party and personal affiliation with Garcia as well as his insistence to wait the result of the temporary restraining order Garcia filed at the court to lift her suspension.

In 2016, he was voted councilor of Talisay City and reelected during the 2019 mid-term elections with the highest number of votes among councilors. Together with Vice Mayor Alan Bucao and 10 councilors, he was among the respondents named in an administrative and criminal complaint lodged at the Office of the Ombudsman - Visayas for the alleged failure to accredit a senior citizens' group, which Bucao described as politically motivated.

== Later life and death ==
On a four-month leave from his duties as provincial board member, Daan underwent triple bypass surgery in December 2013, had an operation for intestinal bleeding on January 18 the next year, and had been going through dialysis since. Upon his return to the Cebu Provincial Capitol on April 6, 2014, he was on a wheelchair and attributed his recovery through the intercession of Teofilo Camomot. He had been frequently hospitalized since serving as Talisay City councilor.

Admitted at Chong Hua Hospital on August 19, 2019, because of mild stroke, he died two days later after he succumbed to heart failure at the age of 74. The Philippine flags each in front of Cebu Provincial Capitol and Talisay City Hall were flown half-mast in his memory a day after his death. His remains were brought for an overnight wake at the Capitol on August 26 and the Cebu provincial government held necrological services the next day, after which the remains were transferred to his residence in Tabunok, Talisay and on August 29, to the Talisay City Hall. After a requiem mass was held at the Archdiocesan Shrine of Santa Teresa de Avila, he was laid to rest at a private cemetery in Cansojong, Talisay City on August 30.

Mindanao Daily characterized him as the icon in Visayas radio drama, and Ruphil Bañoc of DYHP RMN-Cebu said that he was a pillar in radio drama industry in Visayas and Mindanao. Gerald Anthony Gullas, Talisay City mayor, wrote on his social media page, "I know that he was well-loved not just by the Talisaynons, but also by all Cebuanos who always tune in to hear his antics on the radio." Hilario Davide III added, “Teban was well-loved by the Cebuanos not only for bringing joy and amusement to thousands of households through his radio and TV programs but more importantly through his faithful and selfless service to his constituents.”

Sun Star stated that his and Ernesto Lariosa's death was an "immense loss to Cebuano culture" and said in a eulogy, "To the public, the late Julian “Teban” Daan was a funny comedian and a public servant. But to his family, relatives, friends and colleagues in the local entertainment industry, Daan was a man who remained humble despite achieving almost mythic status." In Sun Star's editorial on August 23, the tribute read, "Long before he served Cebuanos as a public servant, he made them laugh and he continued to make them laugh until his failing health prevented him from doing so... For decades, his voice dominated the airwaves, infecting the working class with his tongue-in-cheek humor and quick wit."
