= One Cebu =

Political party in the Philippines based in Visayas

One Cebu Hiniusang Sugbo
- Leader: Gwendolyn Garcia
- Secretary-General: Pablo John Garcia
- Founded: 2007
- Headquarters: Cebu City
- Ideology: Cebuano interests Localism; Populism
- National affiliation: PDP–Laban (2016–2024); UNA (2012–2016); NUP (2011–2012); Lakas–Kampi (2008–2011); KAMPI (2007–2008)
- Colors: Blue; Yellow; White
- House of Representatives (Cebu seats): 8 / 8
- Provincial Governor: 0 / 1
- Provincial Vice Governor: 1 / 1
- Board Members: 12 / 19
- City Mayors (Component Cities): 5 / 6
- Sangguniang Panglungsod (Component Cities): 48 / 60
- Municipal Mayors: 39 / 44
- Sangguniang Bayan: 306 / 352

One Cebu (1CEBU) is a provincial political party based in the province of Cebu. It is headed by Gwendolyn Garcia, former governor of Cebu.

== History ==
=== Formation and 2007 elections ===
The party was formed in response to the Sugbuak, or the failed Cebu-split movement, in time for the 2007 general elections. A brainchild of three Cebuano representatives who were in their last terms of office, Sugbuak entailed the supposed splitting of Cebu province into four independent provinces.

In founding One Cebu, the Garcia family and their supporters capitalized on the widespread opposition to the Sugbuak movement, declaring that there is only one Cebu; hence, the party's name. They later left the Lakas—Christian Muslim Democrats, once the dominant majority party in national politics, and joined former President Gloria Macapagal Arroyo's political party, the Kabalikat ng Malayang Pilipino (KAMPI). The party's strength was further bolstered by internal alliances with the Alayon Alang sa Kalambuan ug Kalinaw (Alayon) party in the first district, led by the Gullas family, and the Barug Alang sa Kauswagan ug Demokrasya (BAKUD) party of the Durano family in the fifth district. This led to Governor Gwendolyn Garcia's wide margin — around half a million votes — in the votes cast for governor in the 2007 elections.

=== 2010 National and Local Elections ===
In the 2010 national elections, One Cebu strongly campaigned for the candidacy of Gilbert "Gibo" Teodoro Jr., the standard bearer of the now-merged Lakas–Kampi. Gov. Garcia promised that Cebu will give 1 million votes to Teodoro, but local election results showed the latter behind then presumptive president-elect Aquino who got more than 400,000 votes.

Gov. Garcia selected businessman Glenn Anthony Soco to be her running mate in the 2010 elections. Gov. Garcia and Soco are said to have a 'romantic relationship,' which created much media hype.

The vice gubernatorial hopeful, however, still lost to the late former vice governor Gregorio Sanchez Jr., who is the founding vice president of One Cebu. Sanchez later bolted out of Gov. Garcia's group after One Cebu welcomed Tuburan, Cebu mayor Constancio Suezo and his team as party members. The former vice governor was against the inclusion of Suezo's group after they allegedly failed to maintain the peace and order situation in the town. A year after Benigno Aquino III was elected President of the Philippines in 2010, One Cebu again switched party allegiance— this time, to the newly founded National Unity Party (NUP), which former Cebu governor Pablo Garcia founded.

=== 2013 Local Elections ===
In 2010, Rep. Pablo John "PJ" Garcia, the governor's brother, announced that he and Soco will be One Cebu's candidates for governor and vice governor, respectively, in the 2013 local elections. But in May 2011, Pablo John said he decided not to run for governor because he wants to continue serving his home district.

=== 2016 National Elections ===
The party joint-forces with the United Nationalist Alliance (UNA) of Vice President Jejomar Binay to form a local coalition for the 2016 national elections. The coalition was launched on February 16, 2016, at the Waterfront Cebu City Hotel & Casino. One Cebu later withdrew support for Binay and his party UNA on March 21, 2016. On April 2, 2016, One Cebu has announced that they will support the presidential candidacy of Davao City Mayor Rodrigo Duterte. The party has pledged to deliver more than 1 million votes for the Visayan candidate. The alliance between One Cebu and Duterte was launched on April 21, 2016.

Winston Garcia, a former Provincial Board Member and former chairman of GSIS during the Arroyo administration was fielded for the gubernatorial post in the province with Nerissa Corazon Soon-Ruiz, former Sixth District congresswoman, running for the vice gubernatorial post. Garcia and Soon-Ruiz were defeated by incumbent Governor Hilario Davide III and Vice Governor Agnes Magpale.

=== 2022 elections ===
After several months, Gwen Garcia officially endorsed the tandem of Bongbong Marcos and Sara Duterte for upcoming 2022 presidential elections. The endorsement of Marcos and Duterte caused PJ Garcia (one of the political supporters of Isko Moreno's presidential campaign) to step down as secretary-general of the party, but PJ Garcia one said that he will still support and campaign for all of the 1-Cebu candidates (especially on their district). Lolypop Ouano-Dizon appointed as interim secretary general. After of the election, the fear of Sugbuak constantly gaining momentum, as another set proposal of the movements arose in July 2022, with Mactan Island, as a separate province.

=== 2025 elections ===
PJ Garcia returned as secretary general, and will run for reelection seeking final term, with his sister Gwen seeking again the governors' office. But, PJ Garcia withdrawn on October 8, 2025, citing his personal projects' advancement, and tapped his wife Karen Flores-Garcia who won unopposed, and Gwen Garcia was defeated by a neophyte Duterte-endorsed candidate Pam Baricuatro. Glenn Soco won the vice gubernatorial race and 1-Cebu snapped 12 seats in the provincial board.

Garcia's defeat in the 2025 elections lead to a revival of possibilities of Sugbuak, mainly around the separation of Bantayan Island (Bantayan, Madridejos and Santa Fe) and the Camotes Islands (San Francisco, Poro, Tudela and Pilar). They are the home of the Bantayanon and Porohanon ethnolinguistic groups.

== Representation in the Congress ==
As of the last elections for the House of Representatives, One Cebu holds 8 out of 317 seats. Cebu's seven congressional districts and the lone district of Mandaue City are currently represented by the following members/allies of One Cebu:

- Rep. Rhea Mae A. Gullas of 1st District (NUP)
- Rep. Edsel A. Galeos of 2nd District (Lakas)
- Rep. Karen Hope F. Garcia of 3rd District (NUP)
- Rep. Sun J. Shimura of 4th District (NUP)
- Rep. Vincent Franco D. Frasco of 5th District
- Rep. Daphne A. Lagon of 6th District (NUP)
- Rep. Patricia C. Calderon of 7th District (NPC)
- Rep. Emmarie M. Ouano-Dizon of the Lone District of Mandaue City (Lakas)

One Cebu also dominates the provincial board with Vice Governor Glenn Soco leading a large majority of Sangguniang Panlalawigan members, plus the presidents of the local Liga ng mga Barangay, Sangguniang Kabataan and the Councilors' League. In the local level, the party has the backing of 51 out of 53 city and municipal mayors throughout Cebu.

== Electoral performance ==
Year	Gubernatorial elections		
Year	Candidate	Vote share	Result
2007	Gwen Garcia	70.25%	Gwen Garcia (1-Cebu / KAMPI)
2010	Gwen Garcia	53.50%	Gwen Garcia (1-Cebu / Lakas–Kampi)
2013	Pablo John Garcia (Note: Also running under the NUP.)	40.98%	Hilario Davide III (Liberal)
2016	Winston Garcia	46.04%	Hilario Davide III (Liberal)
2019	Gwen Garcia	58.51%	Gwen Garcia (1-Cebu / PDP–Laban)
2022	Gwen Garcia	80.80%	Gwen Garcia (1-Cebu)
2025	Gwen Garcia	40.13%	Pam Baricuatro (PDP)

== See also ==
- Barug Alang sa Kauswagan ug Demokrasya
- Bando Osmeña - Pundok Kauswagan
- Partido Barug
- Kugi Uswag Sugbo
