= Glenn Soco =

Filipino businessman and politician (born 1973)

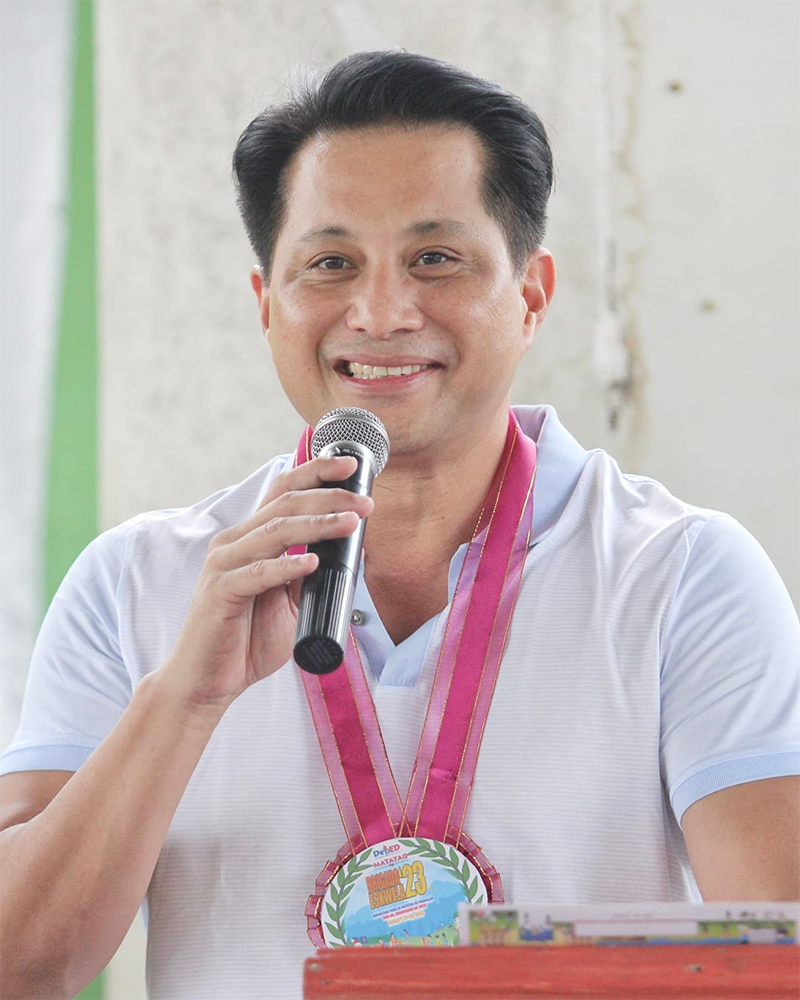
- Soco in 2023

18th Vice Governor of Cebu
- Incumbent
- Assumed office June 30, 2025
- Governor: Pam Baricuatro
- Preceded by: Hilario Davide III

Member of the Cebu Provincial Board from Cebu's 6th district
- In office June 30, 2019 – June 30, 2025 Serving with Thadeo Jovito Ouano

Personal details
- Born: Glenn Anthony Ocampo Soco; October 20, 1973 (age 52) Cebu City, Philippines
- Party: 1CEBU (2009–2012; 2024–present)
- Other political affiliations: PDP–Laban (2018–2024); PMP (2012–2013); Lakas–Kampi (2009–2010)
- Spouse: Krizia L. Nuñez
- Children: 5
- Education: University of San Carlos (BS)
- Occupation: Businessman, politician
- Profession: Industrial engineer

Glenn Anthony Ocampo Soco (born October 20, 1973) is a Filipino businessman and politician who has served as 18th vice governor of Cebu since 2025.

== Early life and education ==
Soco was born on October 20, 1973 in Cebu City, to Guillermo "Momoy" Soco, a former Mandaue City Councilor and Adelina Ocampo. He studied University of San Carlos with the degree of Industrial Engineering.

== Political career ==
In 2010, Soco ran for vice governor of Cebu but he lost to Gregorio Sanchez and garnered only 517,687 votes.

In 2013, Soco ran again for vice governor of Cebu but he lost to Agnes Magpale and garnered only 357,007 votes.

=== Cebu Provincial Board (2019–2025) ===
In 2019 elections, Soco became a member of Cebu Provincial Board for two consecutive terms.

=== Vice Governor of Cebu (2025–present) ===
In 2025 elections, Soco became a vice governor of Cebu but his running mate Gwendolyn Garcia lost to Pam Baricuatro.

== Personal life ==
Soco is married to Krizia Lim Nuñez and has five children.

== Electoral history ==
Electoral history of Glenn Soco
Year	Office	Party		Votes received				Result
Year	Office	Local	National	Total	%	P.	Swing	Result
2010	Vice Governor of Cebu	1CEBU	Lakas–Kampi	517,687	48.36%	2nd	—N/a	Lost
2013	Vice Governor of Cebu	—N/a	PMP	357,007	34.53%	2nd	—N/a	Lost
2025	Vice Governor of Cebu	1CEBU	—N/a	1,090,199	72.46%	1st	—N/a	Won
2019	Board Member (Cebu–6th)	—N/a	PDP–Laban	134,111	36.25%	2nd	—N/a	Won
2022	Board Member (Cebu–6th)	—N/a	PDP–Laban	177,863	45.68%	2nd	—N/a	Won
