= Agnes Magpale =

Filipina politician (born 1942)

The Honorable Agnes Magpale
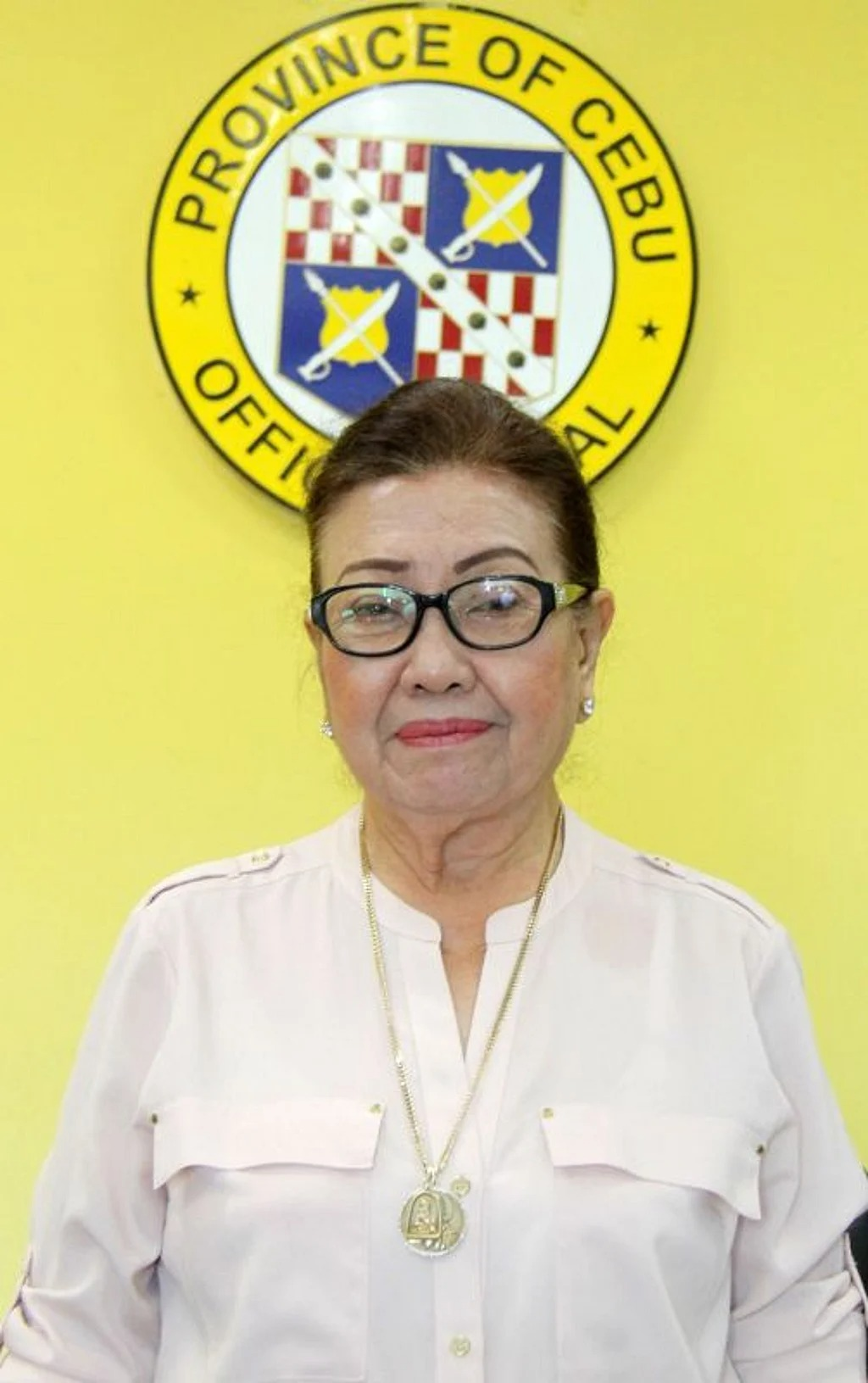
- Magpale in 2019

Vice Governor of Cebu
- In office May 10, 2011 – June 30, 2019
- Governor: Gwendolyn Garcia (2011–13); Hilario Davide III (2013–19)
- Preceded by: Gregorio Sanchez Jr.
- Succeeded by: Hilario Davide III

Governor of Cebu
- Acting
- In office December 19, 2012 – June 30, 2013
- Preceded by: Gwendolyn Garcia
- Succeeded by: Hilario Davide III

Member of the Cebu Provincial Board from the 5th district
- In office June 30, 1992 – June 30, 2001
- In office June 30, 2004 – May 10, 2011

Personal details
- Born: Agnes Dimataga Almendras; January 21, 1942 (age 84) Danao, Cebu, Philippines
- Party: NPC (2018–present); BAKUD (local party; 2012–present)
- Other political affiliations: Liberal (2012–2018)
- Spouse: Arsenio J. Magpale
- Children: Josefina Patricia; Jose Paolo; Miguel Antonio
- Relatives: Almendras family, including brother Rene Almendras
- Education: University of the Philippines Diliman; St. Theresa's College; University of Santo Tomas; Cebu Doctors College
- Occupation: Educator, farmer, politician

Agnes Almendras Magpale (born Agnes Dimataga Almendras on January 21, 1942) is Filipina educator, farmer, and retired politician who previously served as Acting Governor (2012–2013), Vice Governor (2011–2019), and Board Member (1992–2001; 2004-2011) of the Province of Cebu.

Magpale entered politics in Danao City, serving as its Vice Mayor, after which she was elected as Board Member representing Cebu's 5th district from 1992 until 2001, and again from 2004 until 2011. Following her 2010 election as the Board Member with the highest number of votes, Magpale succeeded as Vice Governor following the death of incumbent Gregorio Sanchez Jr. in May 2011, and became Acting Governor in December 2012 during the suspension of Governor Gwendolyn Garcia, serving all in all three offices within a single three-year term.

Magpale was elected to two more terms as Vice Governor in 2013 and 2016 alongside her ally and running mate Governor Hilario Davide III. Following her gubernatorial run in 2019 and subsequent loss to Garcia, Magpale retired from politics after 34 years in public service.

== Early life and education ==
She was born Agnes Dimataga Almendras in Danao on January 21, 1942. The eldest child of Josefino Durano Almendras of Danao and Rosita de la Serna Dimataga of Opon (now Lapu-Lapu City), she attended at St. Theresa's College in Cebu City. Then, she graduated with an Associate in Arts at the University of Santo Tomas in Manila in 1959, acquired a bachelor's degree in nutrition at the University of the Philippines Diliman in 1963, and a master's degree in nutrition at the Drexel University in 1965.

Additionally, she earned a Certificate in Local Administration and Development from the Department of the Interior and Local Government (DILG) and University of the Philippines, as well as Doctoral in Organizational Development and Transformation at the Cebu Doctors College.

== Political career ==
Magpale established her political career in her hometown of Danao and considered the local political leader, her cousin Ramon Durano III, as her mentor. In over two decades in public service, she was known for her concerns for women's and children's rights.

=== Vice Mayor of Danao ===
At the age of 27, her political career began in 1971 when she was elected Danao Vice Mayor.

=== Cebu Provincial Board Member ===
After she quit politics for 13 years to take care of her children, she campaigned and was voted as member of the Cebu Provincial Board representing the 5th legislative district in 1992 and having been elected with the highest number of votes, she served as Presiding Officer Pro-Tempore for three consecutive terms until 2001.

In 2001, she took a break from politics, and she worked as the President of the Northeastern Cebu Colleges for a year. President Gloria Macapagal Arroyo appointed her as member of the Movie and Television Review and Classification Board in the same year.

She again was voted to the Provincial Board and served for consecutive terms in 2004, 2007, and 2010.

=== Vice Governor (2011–2013) ===
Upon the death of Gregorio Sanchez Jr. due to lung cancer on April 29, 2011, she was sworn as Vice Governor of the province of Cebu on May 10, 2011 to serve the remaining unfinished term of Sanchez. An electoral protest before the Commission on Election was ongoing against Sanchez filed by businessman Glenn Soco, thus her seat at the Sangguniang Panlalawigan remained vacant in the case that the protest would be decided in favor of Soco. Her assumption to the post was by virtue of her being the member of the Provincial Board who garnered the highest number of votes in the 2010 election.

On February 12, 2018, the Ombudsman ruled to dismiss then-Representative Gwendolyn Garcia based on the complaint Magpale filed in 2012 over the back-filling in the Balili property, a portion of which was submerged underwater. However, the ruling was overturned by the Court of Appeals on May 12, 2019.

=== Acting Governor (2012–2013) ===
Magpale took her oath as acting governor while Garcia was suspended for six months on December 19, 2012. Garcia's suspension, which was signed by Executive Secretary Paquito Ochoa Jr. on behalf of President Benigno Aquino III, stemmed from the administrative complaint filed by Gregorio Sanchez Jr. in 2010 in connection with hiring of contractual workers. Garcia filed a temporary restraining order at the Court of Appeals, stating that she had acted within the bounds of her office's authority, and stayed in the Cebu Provincial Capitol until January 30, 2013, while Magpale began her term as acting governor in the Legislative Building.

=== Vice Governor (2013–2019) ===
Magpale ran for the position of Vice Governor under the Liberal Party and won in 2013 and was reelected for a second term in 2016.

On October 17, 2018, she filed her certificate of candidacy for Governor under the Nationalist People's Coalition for the 2019 mid-term election. On December 20, 2018, Congresswoman Gwendolyn Garcia of Cebu's 3rd district filed charges at the Office of the Ombudsman against Hilario Davide III, Agnes Magpale, and four Capitol officers on alleged appointments on positions that were "not yet to be declared vacant". Davide stated that the concerned appointments were in conformance to standard procedure.

On March 26, 2019, Garcia together with Provincial Board Member Alex Binghay also filed an injunction against Davide, Magpale, several Capitol officials, contractor WT Construction Inc. and Development Bank of the Philippines from constructing the ₱1.5 billion, 20-story Cebu Provincial Resource Center. Garcia alleged that contract for the building's construction was not authorized by the Provincial Board, while Davide claimed they complied the requisite protocols in pursuing the project.

=== 2019 gubernatorial campaign and retirement ===
Magpale was defeated by Gwendolyn Garcia of PDP–Laban in the 2019 elections, with Garcia returning as Governor of Cebu. She then announced her retirement from politics after 34 years in public service in order to spend more time with her grandchildren and enjoy taking care of her farm.

== Personal life ==
Magpale was married to the late Arsenio J. Magpale, Associate Justice of the Court of Appeals, who died on April 4, 2010. The couple had three children: Josefina Patricia, Jose Paolo, and Miguel Antonio "Migs." Magpale's son, Migs, is a former Provincial Board Member and Danao City Councilor.

Magpale is a descendant of the Almendras and Durano families, both prominent Cebuano political clans. Her younger brother, Rene Almendras, served as Acting Foreign Affairs Secretary, Energy Secretary, and Cabinet Secretary under President Noynoy Aquino. Her uncles were former Senator Alejandro "Landring" Durano Almendras and Vice Governor Priscillano Durano Almendras, who along with her father Josefino were sons of former Danao Mayor Paulo Gonzales Almendras. Danao Mayor and former Vice Governor Ramon "Nito" Duterte Durano III, himself a cousin of former President Rodrigo Duterte, is her second cousin.

According to the 2018 statements of assets, liabilities and net worth, she was the richest elected official in Cebu province with personal properties amounting to ₱44.83 million. She served as the president of Northeastern Cebu Colleges, a family-owned enterprise, and had financial interests with JD Almendras Agro Industrial Development Corporation. Both businesses were located in Danao.

== Honors and awards ==
Magpale is a recipient of the following honors and awards:

- Zonta Leadership
- Garbo sa Danao
- Ten Outstanding Cebuano UP Alumni Award
- Cebuano Heritage Award
- St. Theresa's College Achievers' Award
- 888 New Forum Award as chair of the committee on tourism and international affairs of the Provincial Board
- 2016 The Outstanding Cebuano Award
