= Consolacion =

Municipality in Cebu, Philippines

Consolacion Kampi-ig
- Municipality
- Municipality of Consolacion
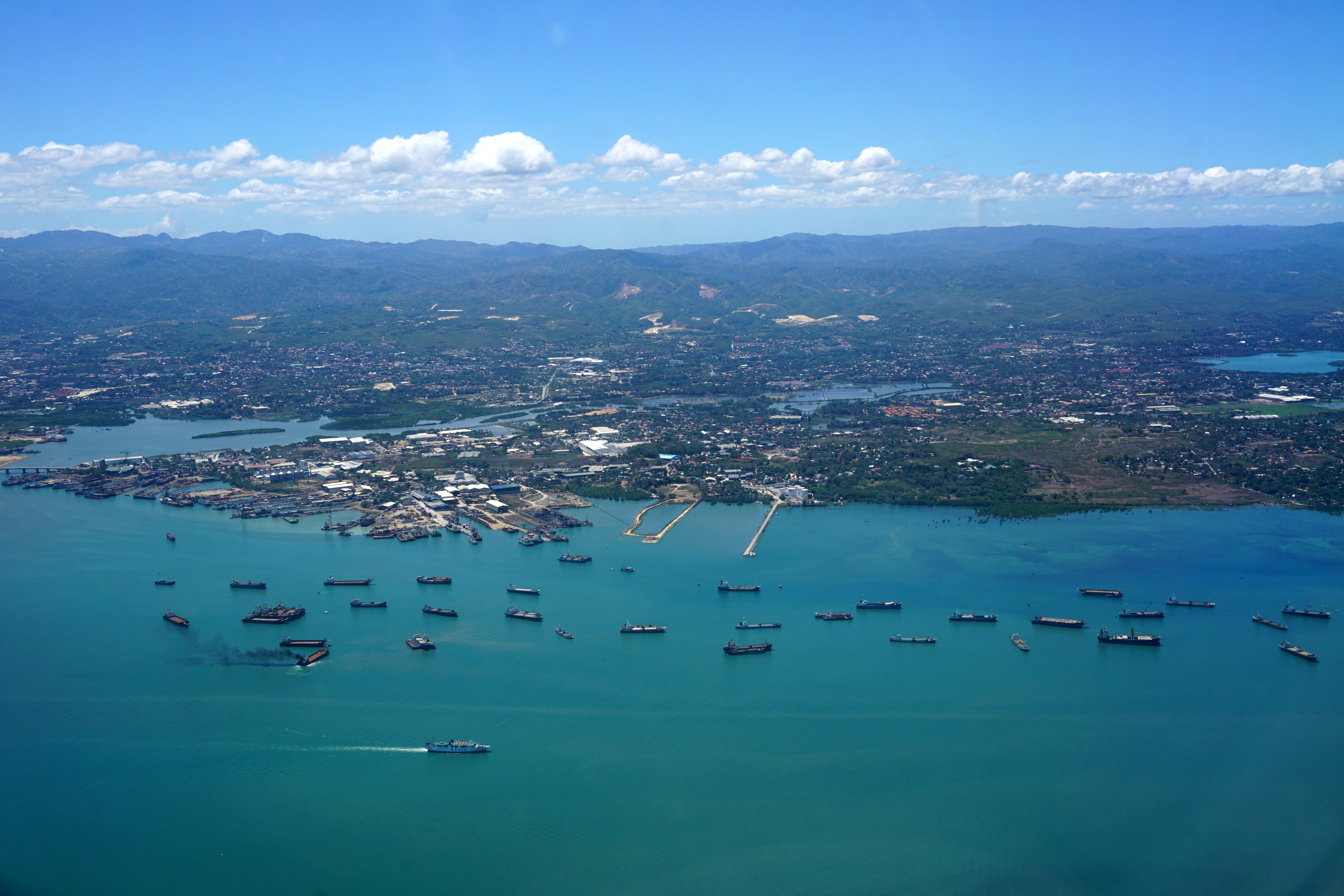
- Shipyard in Consolacion

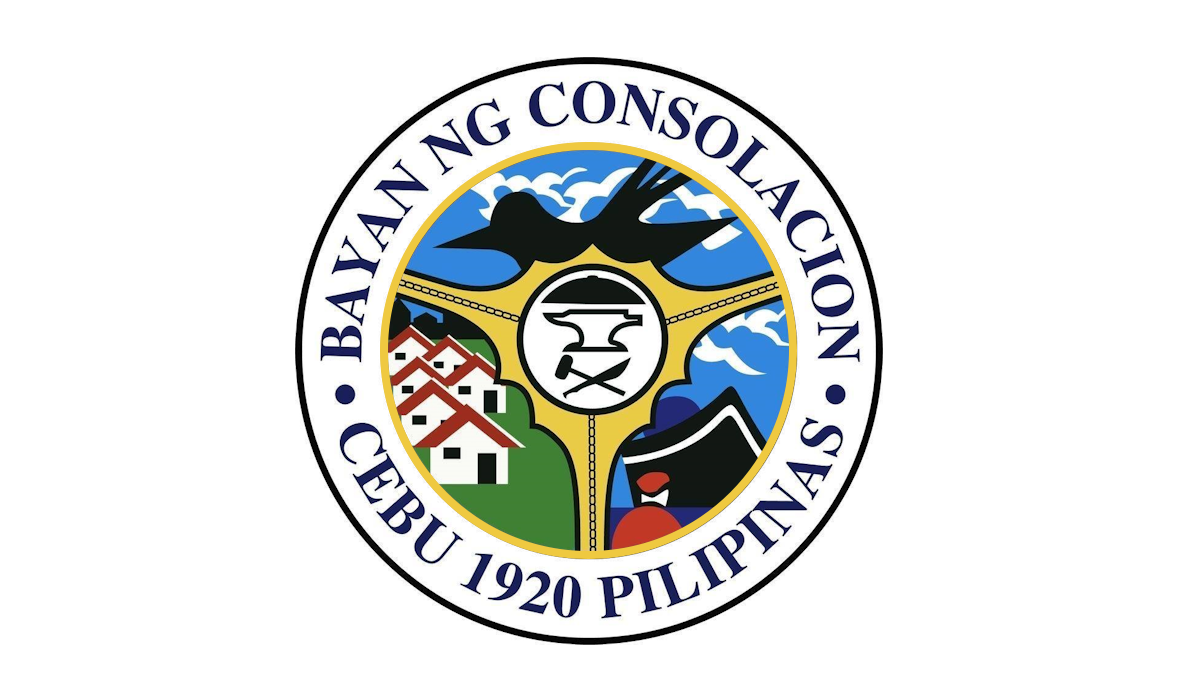
- Flag
- Anthem: "Consolacion, O Lungsod Nga Matahum"
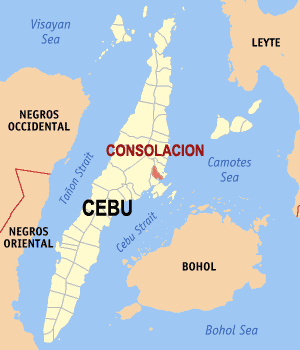
- Map of Cebu with Consolacion highlighted
- Interactive map of Consolacion
- Location within the Philippines
- Coordinates: 10°24′N 123°57′E
- Country: Philippines
- Region: Central Visayas
- Province: Cebu
- District: 6th district
- Founded: 1871
- Reestablished: 1920
- Barangays: 21 (see Barangays)

Government
  - Type: Sangguniang Bayan
  - Mayor: Teresa P. Alegado
  - Vice Mayor: Aurelio A. Damole
  - Representative: Daphne Lagon
  - Municipal Council: Members: Alfred Francis M. Ouano; Marilou P. Casul; Lalinka B. Villo; Leo B. Napuli; Fredelino T. Herrera; Bienvenido G. Ermac; Brando P. Cuizon; Salome I. Palang
  - Electorate: 100,189 voters (2025)

Area
  - Total: 37.03 km^{2} (14.30 sq mi)
- Elevation: 26 m (85 ft)

Population (2024 census)
  - Total: 153,931
  - Density: 4,157/km^{2} (10,770/sq mi)
  - Households: 36,620

Economy
  - Income class: 1st municipal income class
  - Poverty incidence: 10.48% (2023)
  - Revenue: ₱ 768.9 million (2024)
  - Assets: ₱ 2,995 million (2024)
  - Expenditure: ₱ 375.5 million (2024)
  - Liabilities: ₱ 1,121 million (2024)

Service provider
  - Electricity: Visayan Electric Company (VECO)
  - Water: Metropolitan Cebu Water District (MCWD)
- Time zone: UTC+8 (PST)
- ZIP code: 6001
- PSGC: 072219000
- IDD : area code: +63 (0)32
- Native language: Cebuano
- Catholic diocese: Archdiocese of Cebu
- Patron saint: Narcissus of Jerusalem

Consolacion, officially the Municipality of Consolacion (Cebuano: Lungsod sa Consolacion; Tagalog: Bayan ng Consolacion), is a municipality in the province of Cebu, Philippines. According to the 2024 census, it has a population of 153,931 people.

Consolacion is bordered on the north by the town of Liloan, to the west by Cebu City, on the east by the Camotes Sea, and on the south by the city of Mandaue. It is 12 kilometres (7.5 mi) from Cebu City and 5 kilometres (3.1 mi) from Mandaue.

== Etymology ==
The town's name came from the name of the daughter, Consolacion, of the then-Cebu governor when it was re-established as an independent municipality in 1920. The Consolacion is now owned by the Alegados.

== History ==
Consolacion was a component barangay first founded in 1871 with a population of 14,248. Before this, it was only a barrio of the municipality of Mandaue. The barrio, formerly named "Kampi-ig" named after a kind of crab living in mangroves, which was abundant in the area, became a separate town in 1871. However, in 1902 and 1903, unable to maintain its status as an independent municipality, it reverted to Mandaue.

In 1920, Consolacion was again made an independent municipality after a petition was accepted by the governor. So grateful were the townspeople to the Cebuano governor that they named their new town after his daughter – Consolacion – and they also chose San Narciso as their patron saint, the namesake of the governor's wife, Narcisa.

A year after the construction of the Casa Real or municipal hall, the people built their first church. Because it was made of wood, nipa, and bamboo, it was totally destroyed by a typhoon in 1888. A second one was also destroyed by a typhoon in 1892. A third one was built just before World War II, on its current site.

The present municipal hall is already the third one. The first was destroyed by the typhoon of 1892. The second one was also destroyed, by the Japanese during World War II. Today, Consolacion is a robust residential urban municipality with a vigorous economy, providing a place to live for people employed in the neighboring cities of Mandaue, Lapu-Lapu and Cebu.

== Geography ==
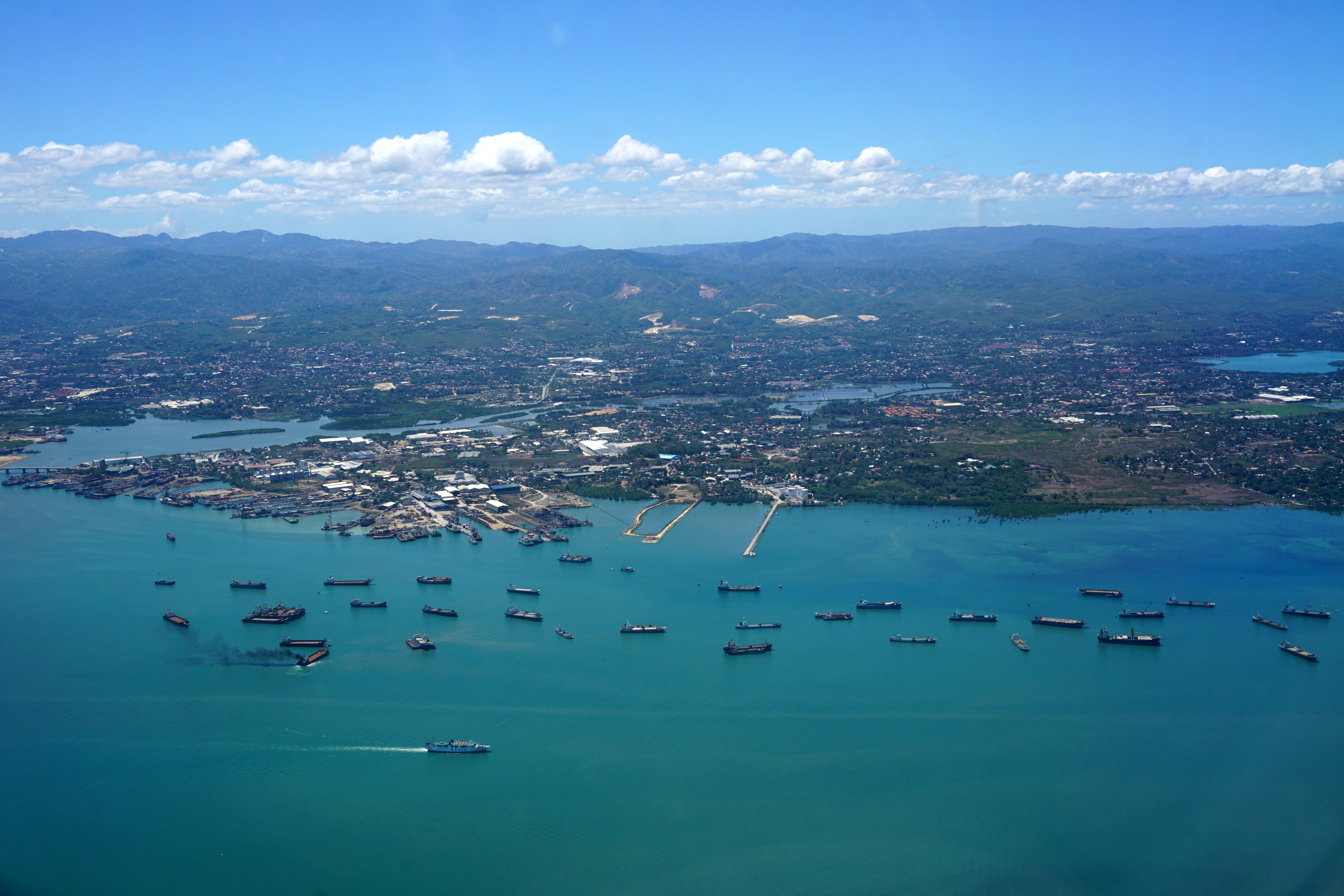
Aerial view of Consolacion

70% of the total area of the town is above or highland mountains and 18% foreshore land. The contours are irregular and the highest point is about 500 meters (1,600 ft) above sea level.

=== Barangays ===
Consolacion is politically subdivided into 21 barangays. Each barangay consists of puroks and some have sitios.

PSGC	Barangay	Population			±% p.a.	
		2024		2010		
072219001	Cabangahan	1.6%	2,483	2,015	▴	1.46%
072219002	Cansaga	3.5%	5,415	4,450	▴	1.37%
072219003	Casili	10.4%	16,025	12,745	▴	1.60%
072219004	Danglag	2.8%	4,235	2,796	▴	2.92%
072219005	Garing	1.7%	2,615	2,253	▴	1.04%
072219006	Jugan	6.4%	9,887	7,970	▴	1.51%
072219007	Lamac	6.1%	9,458	7,217	▴	1.89%
072219008	Lanipga	0.6%	855	748	▴	0.93%
072219009	Nangka	8.7%	13,327	11,021	▴	1.33%
072219010	Panas	0.9%	1,323	1,146	▴	1.00%
072219011	Panoypoy	0.8%	1,229	1,108	▴	0.72%
072219012	Pitogo	3.4%	5,278	3,857	▴	2.20%
072219013	Poblacion Occidental	3.8%	5,854	4,864	▴	1.29%
072219014	Poblacion Oriental	2.2%	3,314	3,163	▴	0.32%
072219015	Polog	1.4%	2,097	1,608	▴	1.86%
072219016	Pulpogan	8.5%	13,123	11,617	▴	0.85%
072219017	Sacsac	1.2%	1,861	1,542	▴	1.31%
072219018	Tayud	13.1%	20,192	15,683	▴	1.77%
072219019	Tilhaong	0.9%	1,337	1,183	▴	0.85%
072219020	Tolotolo	2.1%	3,156	2,555	▴	1.48%
072219021	Tugbongan	5.5%	8,464	7,108	▴	1.22%
	Total		153,931	106,649	▴	2.58%

=== Climate ===
Climate data for Consolacion, Cebu
Month	Jan	Feb	Mar	Apr	May	Jun	Jul	Aug	Sep	Oct	Nov	Dec	Year
Mean daily maximum °C (°F)	28 (82)	29 (84)	30 (86)	31 (88)	31 (88)	30 (86)	30 (86)	30 (86)	30 (86)	29 (84)	29 (84)	28 (82)	30 (85)
Mean daily minimum °C (°F)	23 (73)	23 (73)	23 (73)	24 (75)	25 (77)	25 (77)	25 (77)	25 (77)	25 (77)	25 (77)	24 (75)	23 (73)	24 (75)
Average precipitation mm (inches)	70 (2.8)	49 (1.9)	62 (2.4)	78 (3.1)	138 (5.4)	201 (7.9)	192 (7.6)	185 (7.3)	192 (7.6)	205 (8.1)	156 (6.1)	111 (4.4)	1,639 (64.6)
Average rainy days	13.4	10.6	13.1	14.5	24.2	27.9	28.4	27.7	27.1	27.4	22.5	15.9	252.7
Source: Meteoblue (modeled/calculated data, not measured locally)

== Demographics ==
The population of Consolacion is fast-growing with an intercensal growth rate of 50.45% from 1980 to 1990, repeated and more in subsequent decades.

Population census of Consolacion
Year	Pop.	±% p.a.
1903	5,511	—
1939	9,213	+1.44%
1948	9,432	+0.26%
1960	12,410	+2.31%
1970	17,602	+3.55%
1975	20,444	+3.05%
1980	27,454	+6.07%
1990	41,270	+4.16%
1995	49,205	+3.35%
2000	62,298	+5.19%
2007	87,544	+4.80%
2010	106,649	+7.45%
2015	131,528	+4.07%
2020	148,012	+2.52%
2024	153,931	+0.95%
Source: Philippine Statistics Authority

View chart definition.

Population density
Year	Density
1990	1,100/km^{2}
2000	1,700/km^{2}
2010	2,900/km^{2}
2020	4,000/km^{2}

The demographic distribution profile of Consolacion shows sparsely populated upland barangays, and densely populated lowland barangays within the commercial area along the existing national highway.

== Economy ==
Poverty incidence of Consolacion (%)

Source: Philippine Statistics Authority

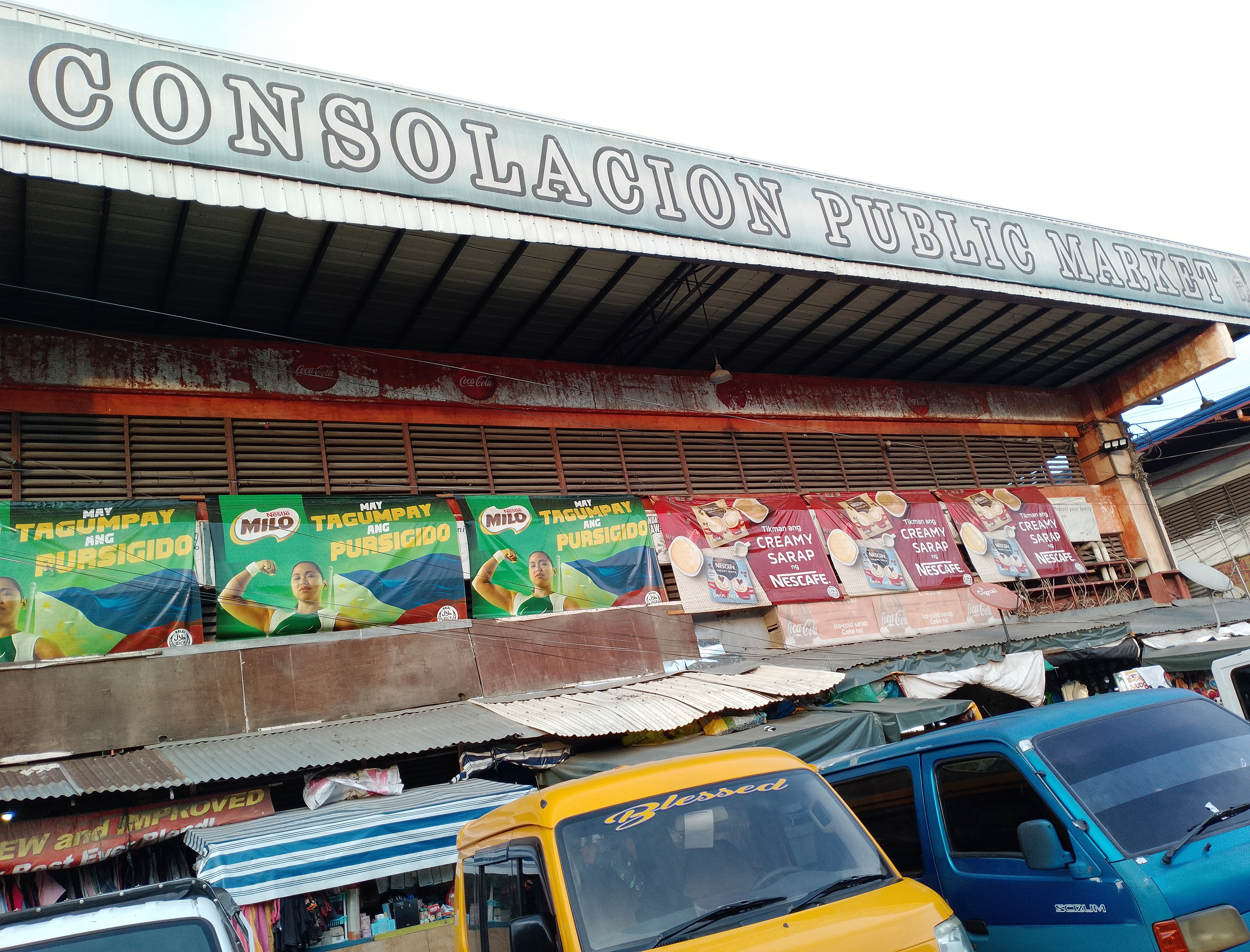
Consolacion Public Market

Consolacion's recent economic trend is towards the development of operation of housing/subdivision facilities even with the presence of several medium size manufacturing industries. Consolacion is predicted to become a residential urban municipality.

=== Infrastructure ===
- Road Network:
  - National Road: 1.5 km (0.9 mi)
  - Provincial Road: 2.5 km (1.6 mi)
  - Municipal Road: 2.0 km (1.2 mi)
  - Barangay Road: 43.7 km (27.2 mi)

=== Utilities ===
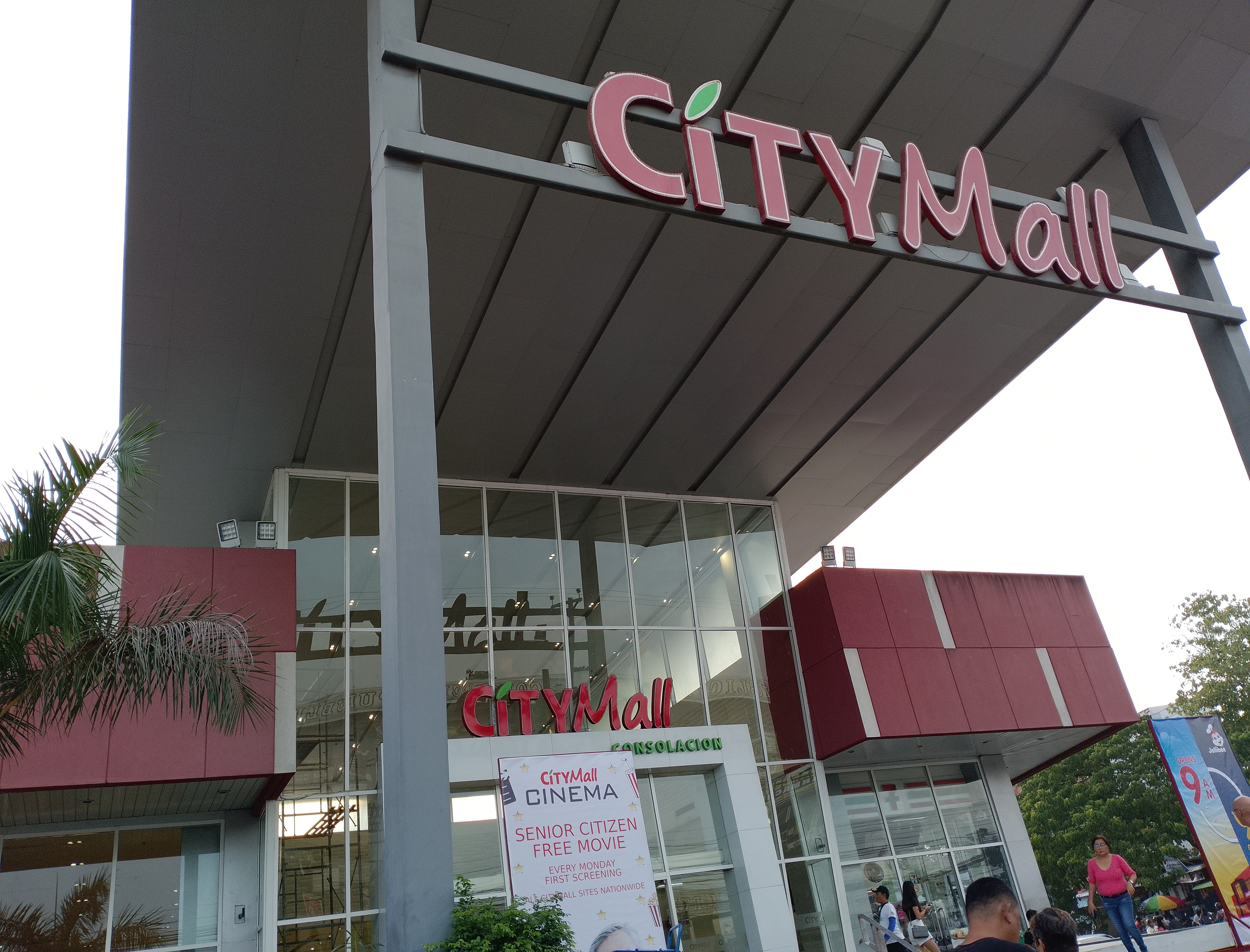
CityMall Consolacion

- Malls: 3
  - In June 2012, SM Supermalls opened its second mall in Cebu – SM City Consolacion, located in Lamac.
- Public Market: 1
- Multi-purpose Building: 1
- Recreation Courts/Centers: 22

== Education ==
- Elementary schools: 16
- High schools: 10
- Vocational: 1
- College: 1

== Culture ==
=== Sarok Festival ===
The Sarok Festival is celebrated every year on Consolacion's foundation day, February 14.

To protect farmers and the folks from the sun and the rain, the sarok, a conical hat made from bamboo strips and dried banana leaves, became popular throughout Consolacion. Over time the Sarok Festival evolved into a street dancing festival, with the musical concept inspired from the Miligoy de Cebu, a published Filipino folk dance originating from the same place.

Contribution to Cultural Heritage

Consolacion is one of the contributor in Cultural History. It had created a dance called "Miligoy de Cebu". This dance is usually performed by pairs of dancers during social gatherings like baptism, weddings, and special programs in the poblacion. Dancers hold a pair of bamboo castanets in each hand.

== Notable personalities ==
- Juan Karlos Labajo - singer and actor
- Mark "Honcho" Maglasang - Ex Battalion founder and leader

== Sources ==
- Cebu Daily News, Doris C. Bongcac (January 21, 2014). "Placer's risks pay off with title". Archived from the original on August 22, 2016.
- Fun-Philippines (July 26, 2014). "Sarok Festival in Consolacion, Cebu". Archived from the original on August 31, 2014.
- Gonzales, Glenda R. (December 2004). "Metro Cebu: A Metropolitan Area in Need of Coordinative Body" (PDF). Discussion Paper. 2004-49. PIDS. Archived (PDF) from the original on March 10, 2016.
