= Hilario Davide III =

Filipino politician (born 1964)

The Honourable Hilario P. Davide III
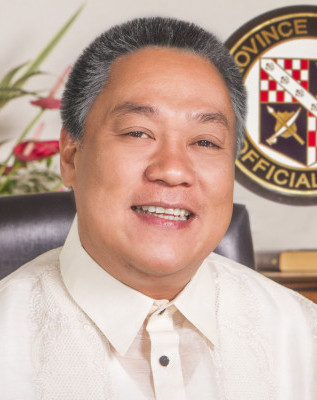
- Davide in 2013

26th Governor of Cebu
- In office June 30, 2013 – June 30, 2019
- Vice Governor: Agnes Magpale
- Preceded by: Gwendolyn Garcia
- Succeeded by: Gwendolyn Garcia

17th Vice Governor of Cebu
- In office June 30, 2019 – June 30, 2025
- Governor: Gwendolyn Garcia
- Preceded by: Agnes Magpale
- Succeeded by: Glenn Soco

Member of the Cebu City Council
- In office June 30, 2004 – June 30, 2010

Personal details
- Born: Hilario Perez Davide III; August 25, 1964 (age 62) Cebu City, Cebu, Philippines
- Party: Independent (2024–present)
- Other political affiliations: Liberal (2009–2024); Lakas (2004–2009)
- Relations: Hilario Davide Jr. (father); Hilario P. Davide Sr. (grandfather)
- Education: University of the Philippines Diliman (BA); University of San Carlos (LL.B.)
- Occupation: Politician
- Profession: Lawyer businessman

Hilario "Junjun" Perez Davide III (born August 25, 1964) is a Filipino politician and lawyer who served as the 17th Vice Governor of Cebu from 2019 to 2025, and previously as its 26th Governor from 2013 to 2019. He is the son of former Chief Justice Hilario Davide Jr.

== Early life ==
Born in Cebu City on August 25, 1964, to former Supreme Court Chief Justice Hilario Davide Jr. and Virginia J. Perez-Davide, both public servants.

== Educational background ==
Junjun finished elementary at the Sacred Heart School for Boys in 1977 and completed high school at the University of the Philippines Visayas – Cebu campus in 1981. He then took up Bachelor of Arts in political science at University of the Philippines Diliman, Quezon City where he graduated in 1991. In 1995, he obtained a Bachelor of Laws degree at the University of San Carlos.

== Political life ==
=== Councilor of Cebu ===
Davide served as councilor of Cebu City from 2004 to 2010.

=== Governor (2013–2019) ===
Leading their opponents by more than 160,000 votes, lawyer Hilario Davide III and Acting Governor Agnes Magpale were proclaimed governor and vice governor on May 13, 2013.

The final and official count showed Davide with 654,054 votes, while Representative Pablo John Garcia got 490,148.

Davide led by 163,906, three years after he lost his first gubernatorial campaign to the then re-electionist Governor Gwendolyn Garcia by more than 96,000 votes.

=== Vice Governor (2019–2025) ===
After serving two terms as Governor of Cebu Province, Junjun Davide bid for Vice Governor under the Liberal Party / Nationalist People's Coalition (NPC) alliance whose official Governor candidate is Agnes Magpale. Magpale lost to Gwen Garcia of PDP-Laban / One Cebu.

Junjun Davide won against Daphne Salimbangon. In honor of the partnership established with Magpale and the BAKUD party of northern Cebu, Davide takes oath as Vice Governor before former Vice Governor Magpale.

To ensure peace and continuous development to Cebu province, the former Governor now Vice Governor Davide turns over 27 sets of capitol documents to then governor-elect Gwendolyn Garcia in a formal turn-over in June 2019. Despite coming from different political groups, Vice Governor Davide vows to support Governor Garcia's agenda for Cebu.

== Website ==
- Hilario Davide III's Facebook account

Political offices
Preceded by Gwendolyn Garcia	Governor of Cebu; 2013–2019	Succeeded by Agnes Magpale
Preceded by Agnes Magpale	Vice Governor of Cebu; 2019–2025	Succeeded by Glenn Soco
