= Geminiano de Ocampo =

Filipino ophthalmologist

Geminiano T. de Ocampo ONS
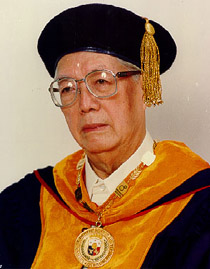
- Official portrait, National Academy of Science and Technology
- Born: September 16, 1907; Malolos, Bulacan, Philippine Islands
- Died: September 2, 1987 (aged 79)
- Education: University of the Philippines College of Medicine
- Spouse: Amparo Leaño
- Parents: Juan de Ocampo (father); Vicenta Tiongson de Ocampo (mother)
- Awards: Order of National Scientists of the Philippines (1982)
- Scientific career
- Fields: Ophthalmology

Geminiano T. de Ocampo was a Filipino ophthalmologist known to some as the "Father of Modern Philippine Ophthalmology". He was the founder of the Philippine Eye Bank. He graduated valedictorian of his class at the Bulacan High School in 1926.

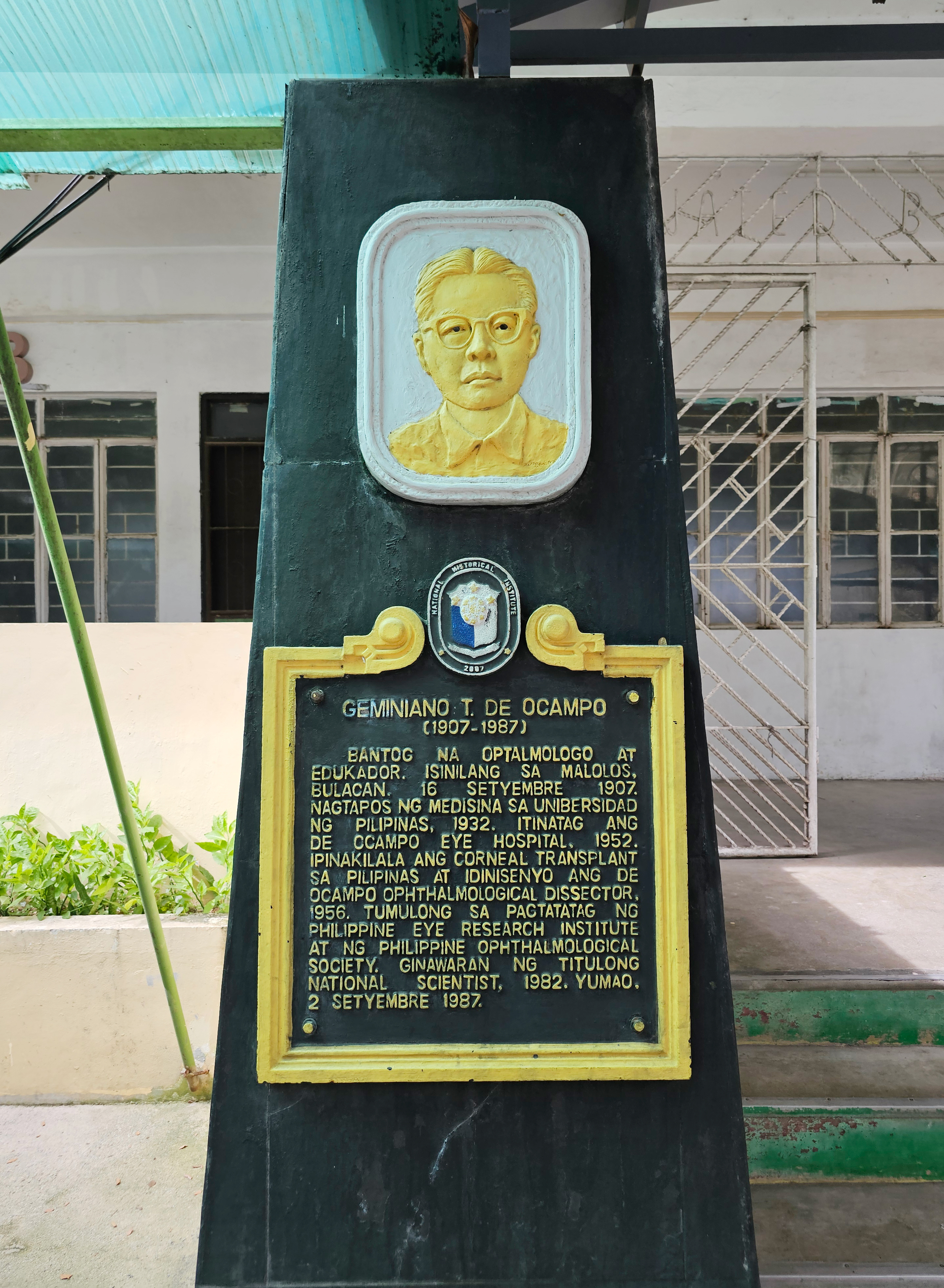
Bas-relief bust of and national historical marker for de Ocampo found inside the Marcelo H. del Pilar National High School in Malolos, Bulacan

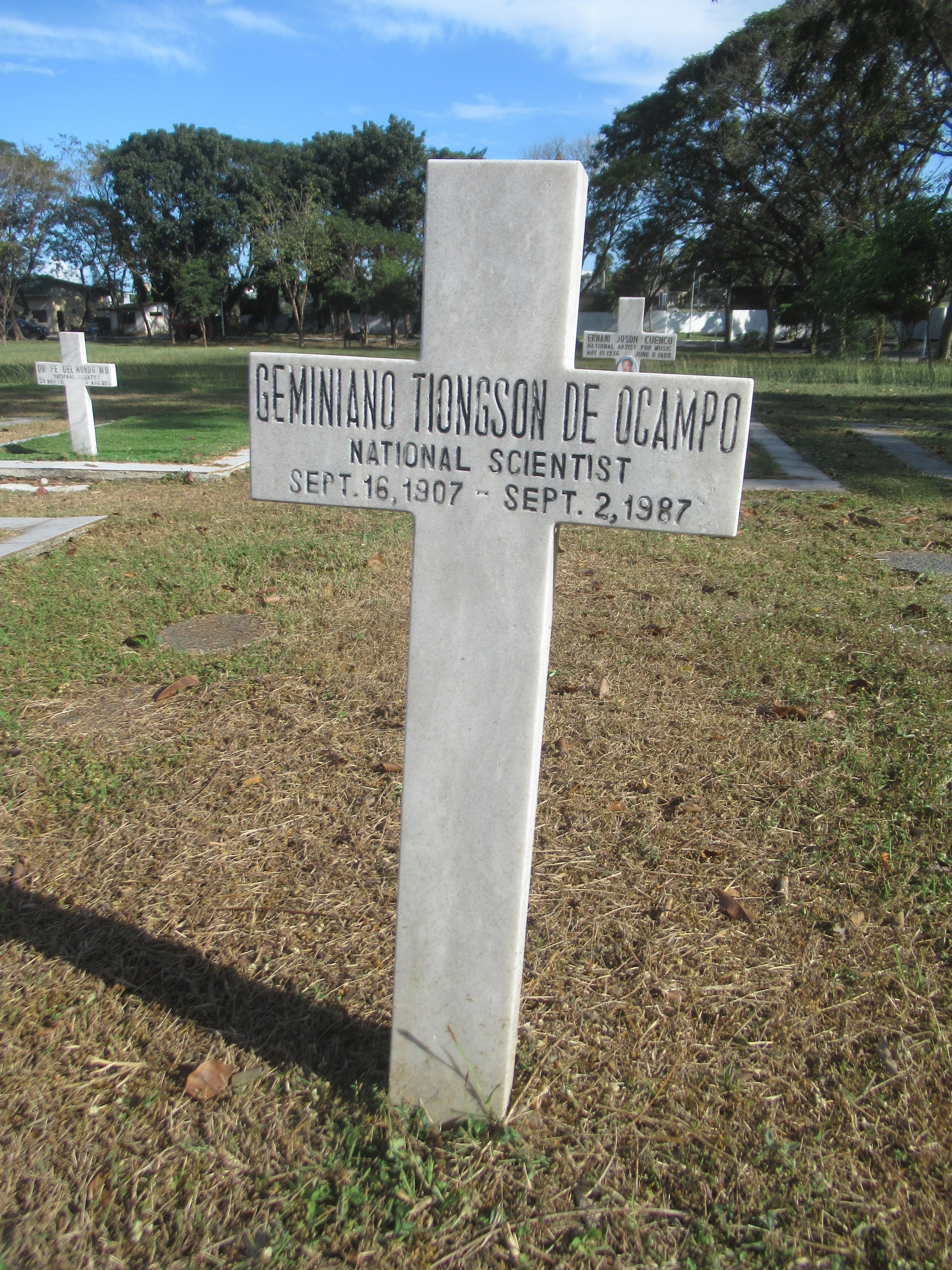
de Ocampo's grave at the Libingan ng mga Bayani.

He established the first eye hospital in the Philippines, De Ocampo Eye Hospital (1952) and the first Filipino President of the Philippine Ophthalmological Society (1958). He was the first Filipino to design a corneal dissector that was manufactured in the US. He received the Jose Rizal Medal in Ophthalmology from the Asia Pacific Academy of Ophthalmology and was named National Scientist of the Philippines in 1982.
