= Marcelo H. del Pilar National High School =

Public high school in Bulacan, Philippines

Marcelo H. del Pilar National High School (formerly Bulacan High School)

Location
- M.H. del Pilar Ave., Bagong Bayan (Sta. Isabel), City of Malolos, Bulacan; Malolos, Bulacan; Philippines; 14°50′29″N 120°50′20″E

Information
- Type: Public
- Motto: Diwa, Dangal, Dunong
- Established: 1905
- Grades: 7 to 12
- Color: Green
- Nickname: Celo, MHPNHS, Home of the Champions

Marcelo H. del Pilar National High School (formerly Bulacan High School) is a public secondary educational institution in the Philippines established in 1903. It offers instruction from Grades 7 to 10 (Junior High School) and Grades 11 to 12 (Senior High School).

The Junior High School implements Basic Education Program alongside five special programs endorsed by the Department of Education which are the Special Program in Science, Technology, and Engineering (SPSTE), Special Program in Journalism (SPJ), Special Program in Foreign Language (SPFL), Special Program in the Arts (SPA), and the Special Program in Sports (SPS).

The Senior High School was added in school year 2016-2017 and offers Academic, Technical, Vocational and Livelihood (TVL), Arts and Design, and Sports tracks. Under these tracks are the various strands, namely: Humanities and Social Sciences (HUMSS), Science, Technology, Engineering and Mathematics (STEM), Accountancy, Business and Management (ABM), Arts and Design (AAD), Sports, and different TVL specializations. Both JHS and SHS offer Open High School Program to expand access to basic education.

== School History ==
=== Early Years in Baliuag, 1903-1905 ===
Bulacan (Provincial) High School was first established in the town of Baliuag in 1903 in a rented house during the time when no suitable site for a school can be used in Malolos. It was called a “high school” to attract pupils who had previously attended some instruction from the Spanish colegio who would not want to enroll in elementary schools anymore. Despite being a high school, instructions provided were second and third grade levels only which by the following school years were upgraded to grades 4, 5 and 6 until it finally offered a high school level course by 1906.

The first teachers were three Thomasites, namely Miss Ella King Vogel, Mr. James A. Fairchild and Mrs. Lillie Turner. Mr. Fairchild served as the first principal. They were under the supervision of Mr. E. G. Turner as the provincial superintendent (Bureau of Insular Affairs, 1904, p. 742).

The number of enrollees grew from a few 87 to 227 pupils during the school year 1903-1904. At the time, a plan for a high school building in Malolos was already approved and funded with P32,000 from the provincial government. The province had to financially support the high school as prescribed by the Philippine Commission Act of March 7, 1902 (Alzona, 1932, p. 228). At the same time, money had been apportioned from insular funds for the construction of an industrial school in Malolos in connection with the projected provincial high school (Bureau of Insular Affairs, 1906, p. 485).

=== Journey to Malolos, 1906 ===
The new building in Malolos was built in the capitolio (Guinhawa, Malolos). Construction began in July 1905, was finished by February 1, 1906, inaugurated by March, and was occupied at the beginning of the school year in June 1906.

=== Class of 1909: The First Five Graduates ===
The first class of BHS graduated from high school in 1909. It included five students, Juan Sepulveda Fernando, Gabriel Adriano Bernardo, Miguela Guevara Baltazar, Enrique Florencio Pangilinan Ochoa and Irene San Juan.

Apart from San Juan, all will study at the newly opened University of the Philippines in Manila. Fernando, Baltazar, and Ochoa graduated in Medicine while Bernardo will get a bachelor of arts and will eventually become UP's chief librarian.

=== Bulacan High School Strike of 1912 ===
Mabilasik na prinsipal! (A Harsh Principal!)

That was the banner news of the Plaridel community newspaper two months after the start of classes at Bulacan High School in 1912. The bold statement was about the allegedly unfriendly treatment of the new principal Mr. William E. McVey to the students.

In the letter published by the students they detailed the violent acts of Mr. McVey. These include pushing, pulling, and tugging of clothing of students. The strike escalated after the American authorities sided with the principal and ignored the complaints.

This was later followed by sanctions, the most severe of which was the expulsion of the students and their non-admission to any school. In the Plaridel newspaper, Romualdo Vijandre expressed the side of the students and their reasonable response to the decision of the Bureau of Education:

“Huwag sabihing ang ganito’y pag-aaksaya ng panahon at gugol, pagka’t ang mga pusong nagtatanggol ng matuwid at katapatan, ay talagang naglalaan ‘di lamang dugo kung ‘di sampu ng buhay.” (Don't say that this is a waste of time and effort, because the hearts that defend what is right and honest, can sacrifice not only blood but also their very lives.)

The Strike of 1912 was radical for many reasons. In a broader perspective, the action can be contextualized in the then unfinished Philippine-American War. Statements about the strike reflect the courage and reason of BHS students on issues related to education and social justice.

=== Three National Scientists ===
The National Scientist award is the highest honor given by the president of the Philippines for scientists who have made invaluable contributions to science in the country. Whoever is awarded this receives a financial reward, medical benefits, free hospitalization, a monthly pension and the full honor of burying their lips in the Tomb of the Heroes.

Bulacan High School is unique because it has installed three National Scientists. They are Francisco O. Santos (Class 1912), Gregorio T. Velasquez (Class 1920) and Geminiano T. de Ocampo (Class 1925).

=== World War II ===
Like the entire nation, BHS and its students were not spared of the violence brought by the Japanese occupation during the Second World War.

Below is an extract from the recollections of Reynaldo P. Enriquez of the Class of 1942 who honored his classmates who gave their lives for the country during the war.

Good times always seem so short. Bad times seem to take forever. For some of us, the World War II seemed an infinity. And yet the start of WWII prematurely ended our happy high school days. Many of us joined the guerilla movement imbued with the spirit of love of country we learned in school. Some paid the supreme sacrifice in defense of country and people.

Cecilio Abraham of Baliwag, was captured, tortured, and killed by the Japanese. He was killed for his guerilla activities. To honor him the grateful people of his town named the place where he lived, Barangay Tenyente Cecilio Abraham. A fitting tribute to his bravery and dedication to serve his country and people.

Genaro Bernabe was a young lieutenant from Bulacan. Only a few more days and he would have marched home a hero. He was killed in action in the last days of the war in Kiangan, Mt. Province where the last Japanese stronghold commanded by General Yamashita made their last stand.

Bienvenido Cruz was a silent and good looking young man from Malolos. One would not think he was a soldier if he was not in uniform. He survived the war, even the hell of the battle in Kiangan. In Laguna, where he was as signed as a communication specialist, he died in line while in the military service.

Claro Carpio, frail-looking during high school, was among the early members of the guerilla movement in his hometown of Bulacan. He was hunted, captured, and killed by the Japanese: How he died is not known even to his com rades. His body was never recovered.

=== From BHS to MHPHS/MHPNHS ===
Bulacan High School was last used as a school name in 1951. This was after Republic Act 618 was passed on May 15, 1951. It changed the name from BHS to Marcelo H. del Pilar High School in recognition of Marcelo H. del Pilar, a great son of the province of Bulacan and a national hero. The law was filed by Representative Alejo Santos and was signed into law by President Ramon Magsaysay in 1951. The name change sought to instill in the minds of the youth of Bulacan the life and contributions of del Pilar.

MHPHS would later add "national" in its name in 2003.

=== On its present site ===
The high school buildings in capitolio were destroyed during World War II. Because of this, the school temporarily used various facilities such as Casa Real and Mojon Elementary School (Barasoain Memorial Elementary School).

New buildings were built in the 1950s and 60s such as the Marcelo H. Del Pilar Science Centrum (near UNIWIDE). Soon the school will be moved to a bigger campus where it currently stands.

This happened during the time of Governor Ignacio Santiago when the High School was moved to a 10-hectare land in Sta. Isabel (Bagong Bayan) Malolos. The new campus was inaugurated on July 31, 1984, the governor's birthday.

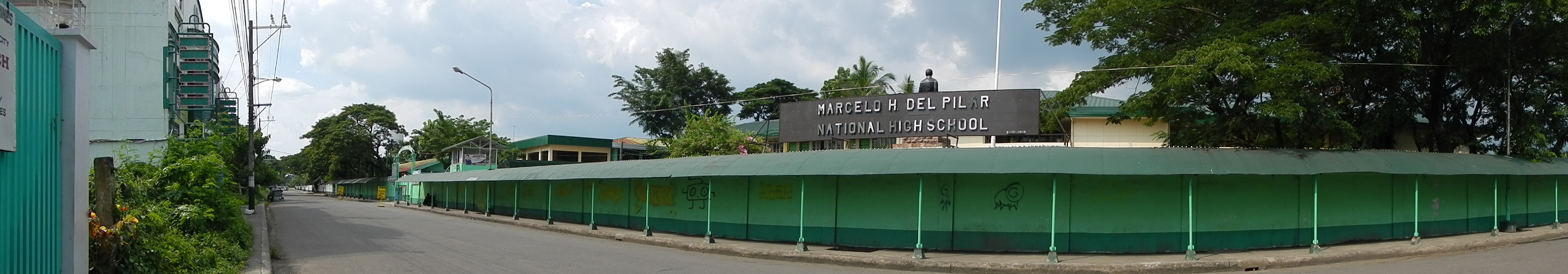
Marcelo H. del Pilar National High School Entrance Gate

== School Hymns: Then and Now ==
=== MHPHS HYMN (version sung up to 2003) ===
Titik ni Moises Simbulan

Musika ni Juliano Velasco

Batis ng aming karunungan

Sa buhay tanging pamatnubay

Layo mang lakbayin, sa ligaya't sakit,

Katapatan namin sa puso't bait.

Sa aming diwa'y nakatanim,

Ang alaalang walang maliw.

Pagsinta'y laging nag-aalab

Sa puso at bait sagisag,

Ang mahal naming Marcelo H. del Pilar.

=== HIMNO NG MHPNHS (present hymn) ===
Titik ni Lourdes G. Hipolito

Musika ni Marquez T. Cartel

Pambansang Mataas na

Paaralang Marcelo H. del Pilar

Aming dakilang paaralan

sa amin ay luminang ng ganap

Sa bawat araw laging patnubay

Sa pagbabago ng ating buhay

Ang iyong liwanag, sa ami’y tatanglaw

Tungo sa tagumpay nitong ating buhay

Mananatili sa aming puso

Mga gintong aral na iyong tinuro

Dito nag-uugat ang karunungan

Kakayahang hatid sati’y kaunlaran

Aming dakilang paaralan

Sa amin ay luminang ng ganap.

== Official Publications ==
The Republic and Ang Malaya are the official English and Filipino publication of Marcelo H. del Pilar National High School, respectively.

Some of the notable achievements of these publications are the following:

- The Republic - Finalist, Best School Organ (Secondary Level), 2016 Catholic Mass Media Awards
- The Republic - Best School Paper of the Philippines, 1995, 2015
- The Republic and Ang Malaya - Outstanding School Paper in Region III, 2013
- Ang Malaya - Outstanding School Paper in Region III, 2014
- Ang Malaya - Pinakamahusay sa Pag-aanyo ng Pahina, National Schools Press Conference, 2015

Two of the advisers of these publications were hailed as Outstanding School Paper Advisers in the country, they were:

- Mrs. Bernadette F. Tamayo of The Republic - 1995 Most Outstanding School Paper Adviser in the Philippines (served as The Republic's adviser for more than 17 years)
- Mrs. Jocelyn M. Manahan of Ang Malaya - 2014 Most Outstanding School Paper Adviser in the Philippines (started serving as Ang Malaya's adviser on 2006 up to present)

== Clubs and Organizations ==
- Supreme Secondary Learner Government (SSLG) is the highest student governing body at MHPNHS.
- Science Department
  - Youth for Environment Schools Organization (YES-O)
- Mathematics Department
  - Mathematics Club
- English Department
  - Literati
- Social Studies Department
  - KABAYANI CLUB - Kasaysayan at Bayanihan ng mga Mag-Aaral ng Araling Panlipunan
  - Kolab ng mga Mag-aaral sa Araling Panlipunan (AP KOLAB)
- Values Department
  - Values Formation Club (VFC)
  - We Advocate Time Consciousness and Honesty (WATCH)
  - Peer Facilitators Club
  - Honesty Club
- Music, Arts, Physical Education and Health (MAPEH) Department
  - CAT-I
  - Visual Arts Club
  - Music Family
    - MHPNHS Chorale
    - MHPNHS Brass Band
    - Strings Ensemble
  - MHPNHS Performing Arts Group
    - Koro del Pilar
    - MHPNHS Angklung Ensemble
    - MHPNHS Rondalla
    - MHPNHS Flute Ensemble
    - MHPNHS Drum and Lyre Band
    - Creative Dance Group
  - MHPNHS Dance Troupes
  - Dance Sports Club
  - Folk Dance Troupe
- Technology and Livelihood Education (TLE) Department
  - Information and Communications Technology (ICT) Club
  - Future Farmer of the Philippines (FFP) Club
  - Future Homemakers of the Philippines (FHP)
  - Youth Entrepreneur's Club (YECS)
- Senior High School
  - KOLAB Social Science Education Collective
  - OBRA Arts and Design Club
  - I Research and Innovate in Science and Engineering (IRISE)
  - Junior Business Executives Association (JBEA)
  - SHS Academic Circle
  - Del Pilarian Debate Society
  - Youth for Environment Schools Organization (YES-O) SHS
  - Rotaract Club of Barasoain MHPNHS-SHS
- MHPNHS Aklatang Gabriel A. Bernardo
  - EX LIBRIS Library Volunteers

== Achievements ==
- MHPHS Rondalla - Most Outstanding Performer NAMCYA National Music Festival 2000 / Samiweng 2000 National Music Festival
- First Place November 19, 2009, Poetry Performed Competition at the Baler 400: the Quadricentennial Anniversary of the Town of Baler, Province of Aurora
- MHPNHS Rondalla - Champion Feb 17, 2011, Rondal-Awit Competition at the 10th Musikahan Festival held at Tagum City, Davao.
- MHPNHS Koro Del Pilar - Champion (Classical Category) February 2012, Children's Choir Competition at the 11th Musikahan sa Tagum in Tagum City, Davao Del Norte, under Mr. Conrado "Radie" Santiago.

== Notable alumni ==
=== Government ===
- Batch 1939 Tomas S. Martin - Governor, Bulacan (1958 to 1963)
- Batch 1958 Aurelio S. Plamenco - Vice Governor, Bulacan (1998 to 2007)
- Batch 1968 Vicente C. Cruz Sr.- Board Member, District 1 Bulacan (2007–present)
- Batch 1968 Danilo Domingo - Mayor, City of Malolos (2001–2010)
- Batch 1976 Paquito Ochoa, Jr. - Executive Secretary (2010–2016)

=== Film, Arts and Entertainment ===
- Batch 1967 Jaime Florcruz - Former CNN Bureau Chief, Beijing/ Philippine Ambassador to China (2022–present)
- Batch 1981 Jerry Lopez Sineneng - Film Director and Writer

=== Science and Education ===
- Batch 1926 Dr. Geminiano T. De Ocampo - Class Valedictorian, Ophthalmologist, National Scientist (1982), a.k.a. "Father of Modern Philippine Ophthalmology"
- Batch 1909 Gabriel A. Bernardo - Born in Malolos, March 14, 1891. Father of Philippine Librarianship
