= Malolos =

Capital city of Bulacan, Philippines

- Component city
- City of Malolos
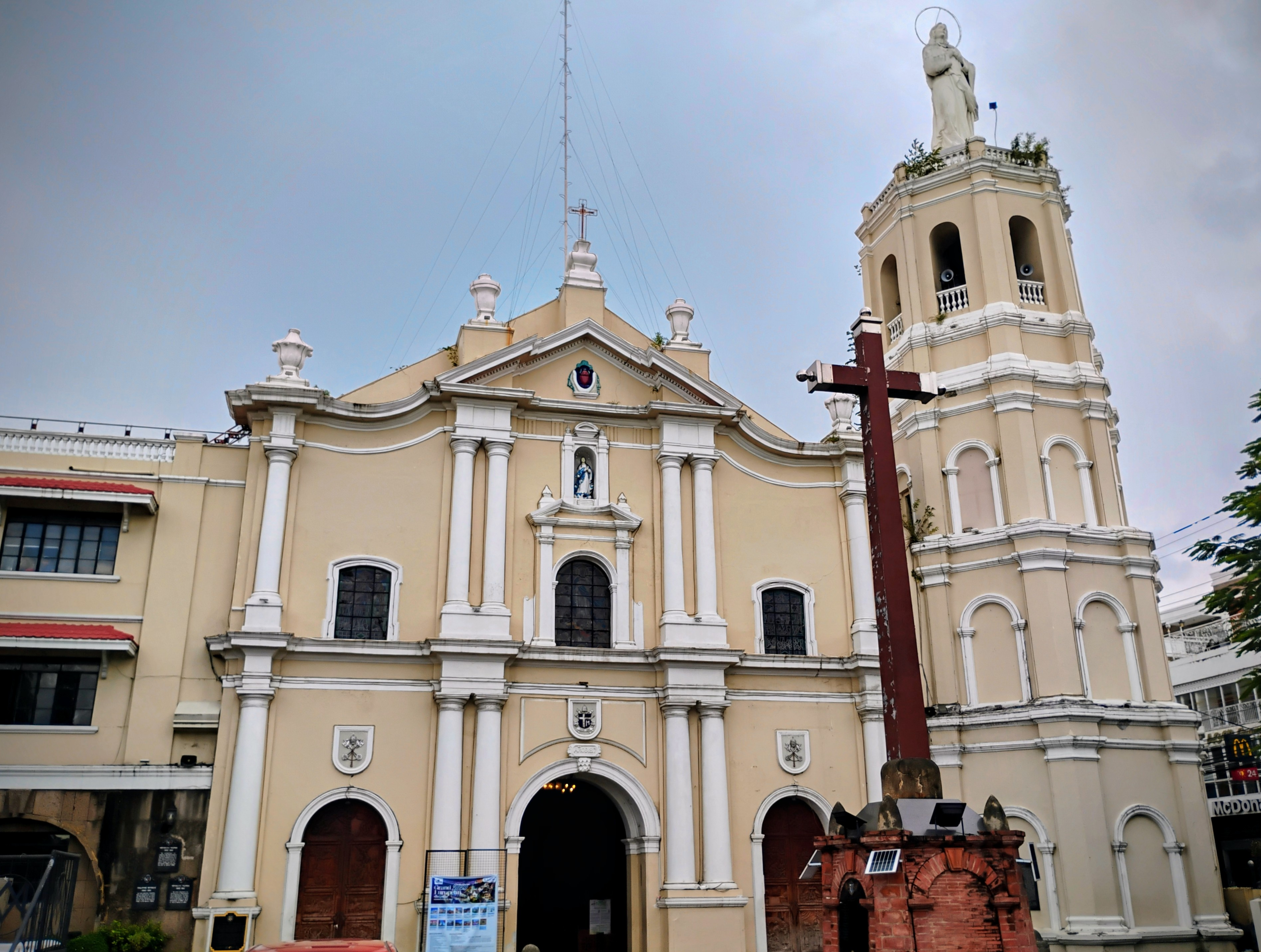
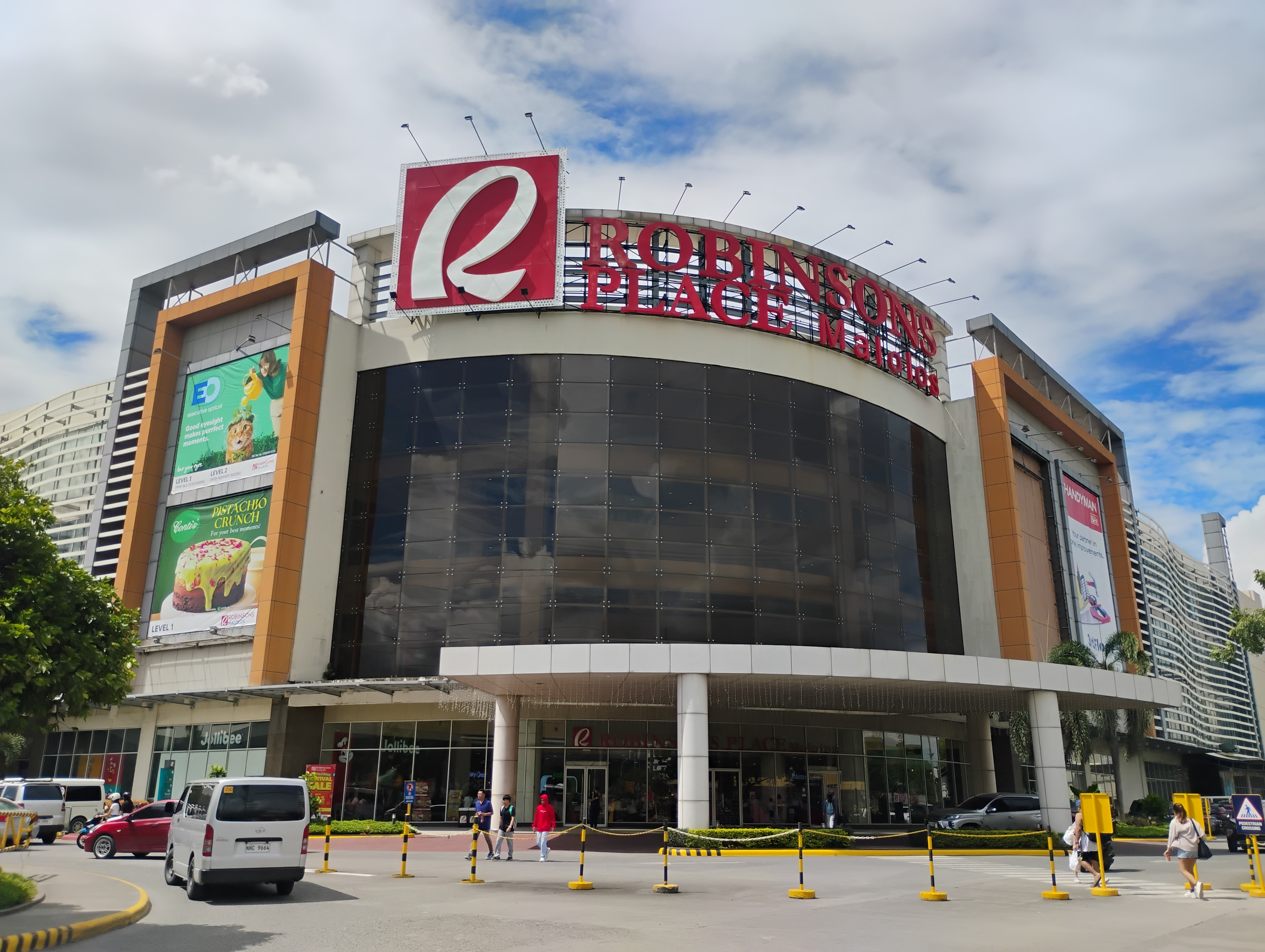
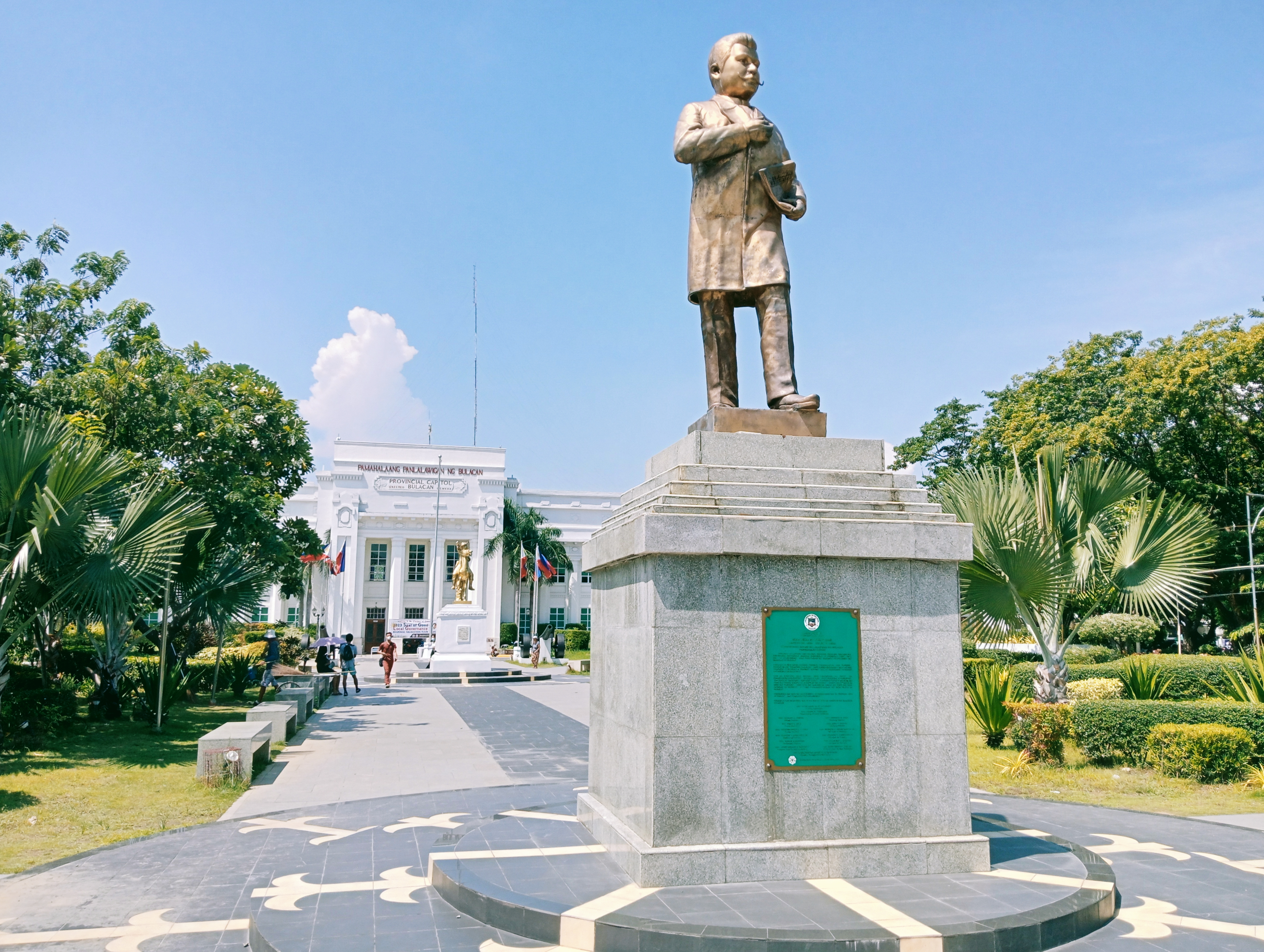
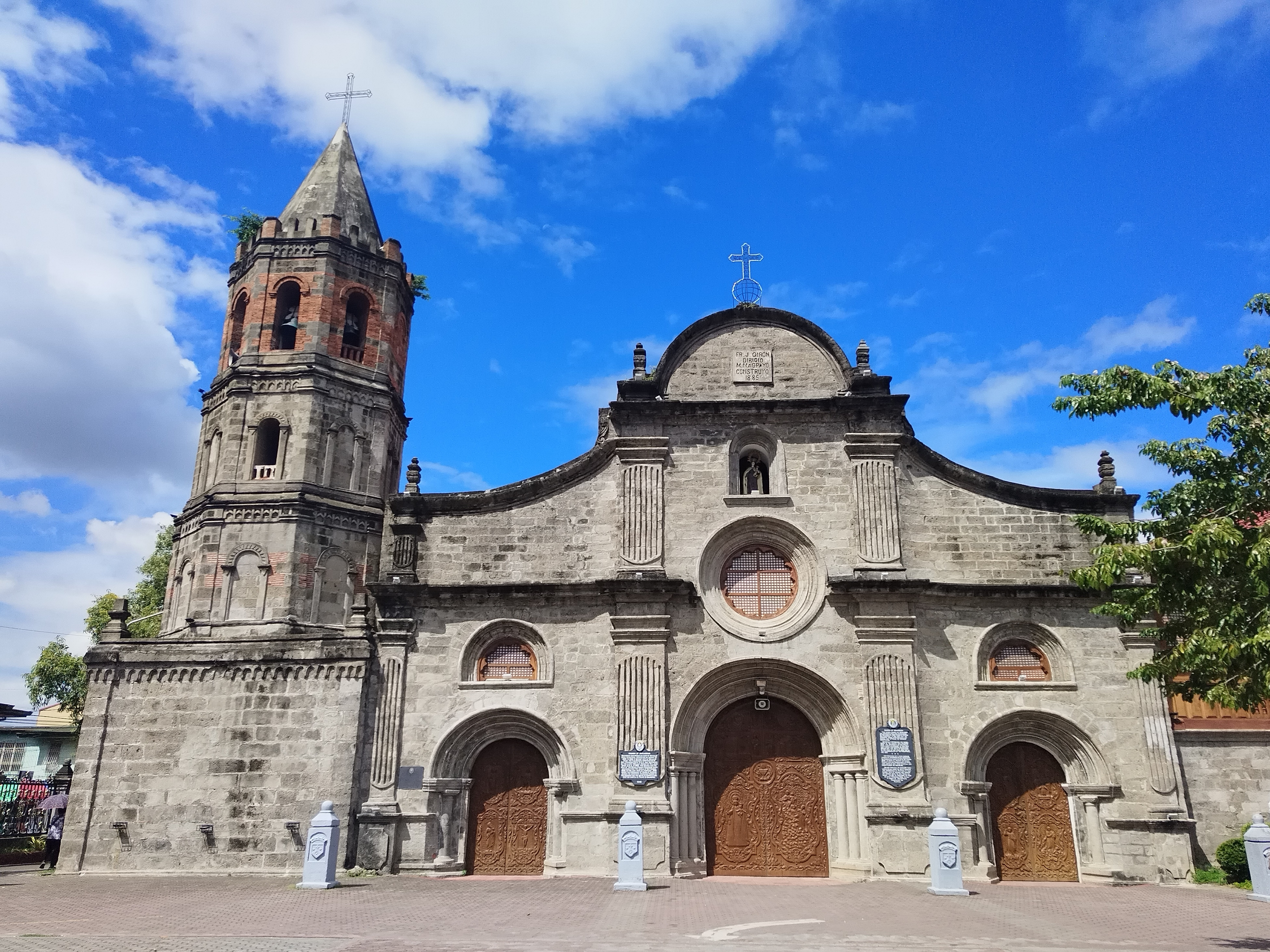
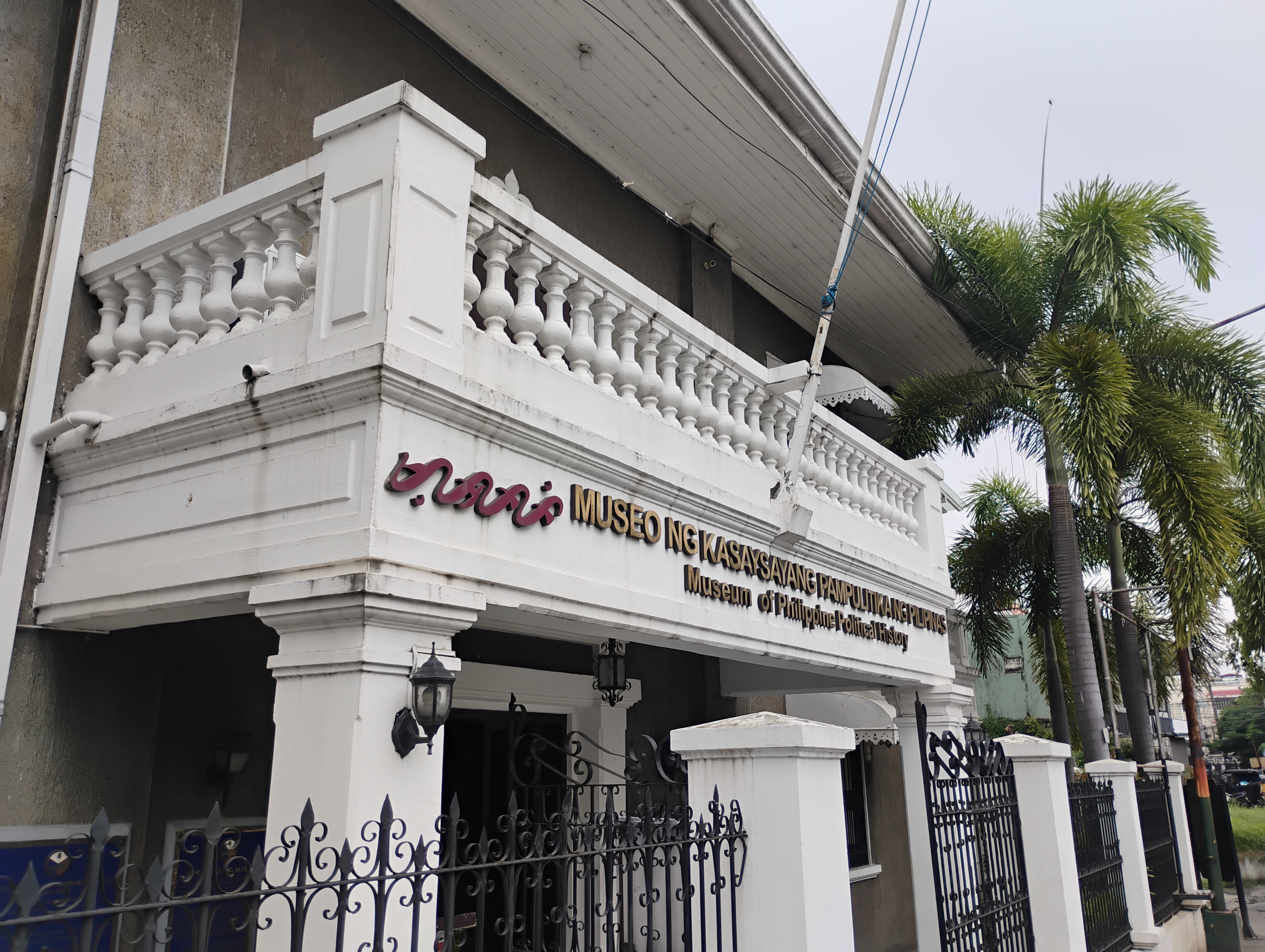
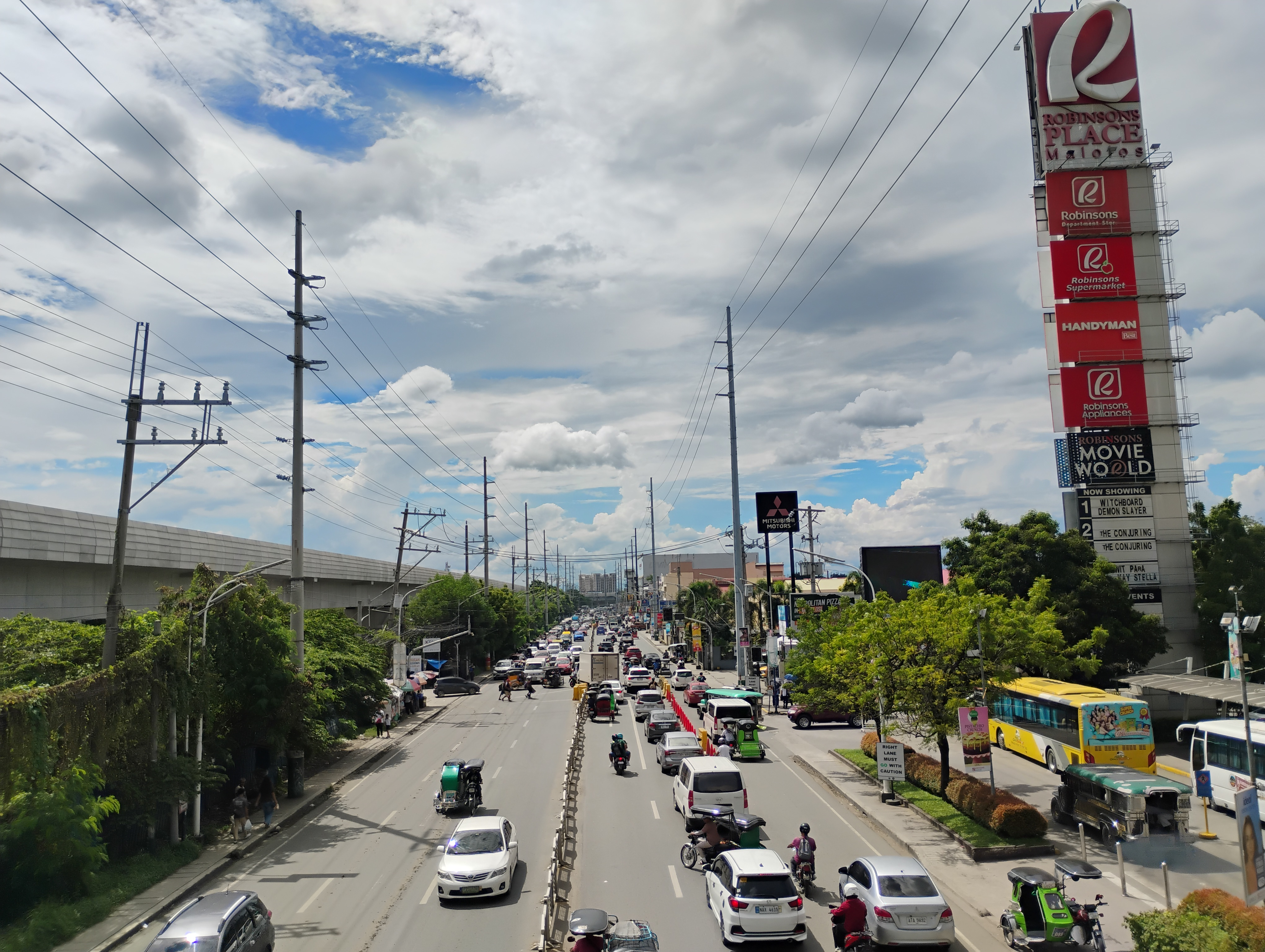
- (From top, left to right): New Malolos City Hall, Malolos Cathedral, Robinsons Place Malolos, Bulacan Provincial Capitol, Barasoain Church, Malolos Casa Real, MacArthur Highway

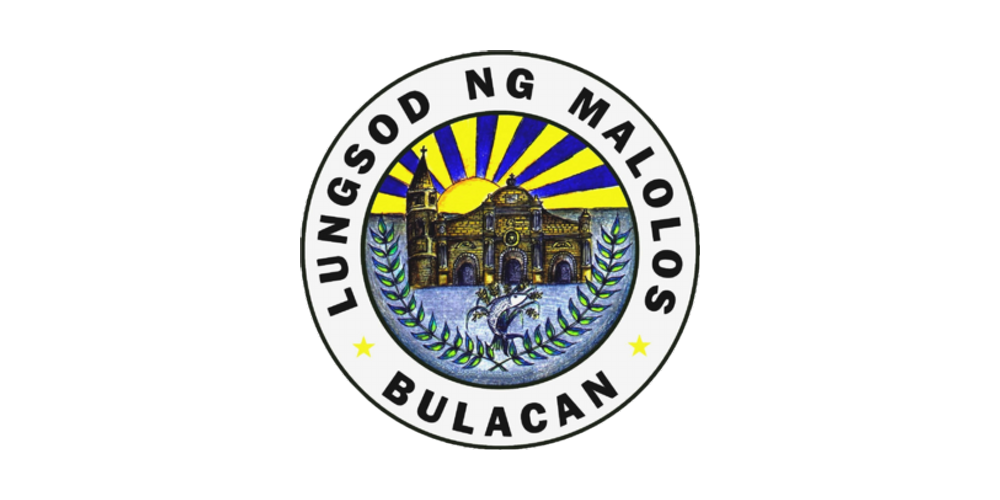
- Flag Seal
- Nicknames: Cradle of the Philippines; Carabao Capital of the World; Renaissance City of Central Luzon
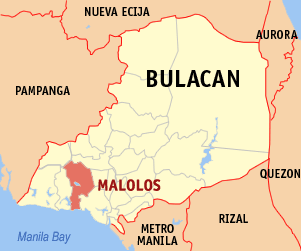
- Map of Bulacan with Malolos highlighted
- Interactive map of Malolos
- Location within the Philippines
- Coordinates: 14°50′37″N 120°48′41″E
- Country: Philippines
- Region: Central Luzon
- Province: Bulacan
- District: 1st district
- Settled: 10th century CE (part of the kingdom of Ma-i)
- Founded: 1225 (as Li-Han); November 14, 1571 (as an encomienda); June 11, 1580 (as a civil town)
- Cityhood: December 18, 1999
- Founder: Miguel Lopez de Legazpi
- Barangays: 51 (see Barangays)

Government
  - Type: Sangguniang Panlungsod
  - Mayor: Christian D. Natividad
  - Vice Mayor: Gilbert T. Gatchalian
  - Representative: Danilo A. Domingo
  - City Council: Members: John Vincent G. Vitug III; Dennis D. San Diego; Meri Ann Geli Bulaong; Edgardo F. Domingo; Victorino M. Aldaba III; Luis Alfonso M. Arcega; Miel Arthem B. Agustin; Miguel Carlos B. Soto; Noel G. Pineda; Christian Peter C. Bautista
  - Electorate: 135,662 voters (2025)

Area
  - Total: 67.25 km^{2} (25.97 sq mi)
  - Land: 67.25 km^{2} (25.97 sq mi)
- Elevation: 9.0 m (29.5 ft)
- Highest elevation: 105 m (344 ft)
- Lowest elevation: −4 m (−13 ft)

Population (2024 census)
  - Total: 269,809
  - Density: 4,012/km^{2} (10,390/sq mi)
  - Households: 64,898

Economy
  - Income class: 1st city income class
  - Poverty incidence: 7.68% (2023)
  - Revenue: ₱ 1,610 million (2024)
  - Assets: ₱ 3,208 million (2024)
  - Expenditure: ₱ 1,581 million (2024)
  - Liabilities: ₱ 972.6 million (2024)

Utilities
  - Electricity: Meralco
- Time zone: UTC+8 (PST)
- ZIP code: 3000
- PSGC: 031410000
- IDD : area code: +63 (0)44
- Native languages: Tagalog
- Catholic diocese: Diocese of Malolos
- Website: www.maloloscity.gov.ph

Malolos [maˈlɔlɔs], officially the City of Malolos (Filipino: Lungsod ng Malolos; Kapampangan: Ciudad/Lakanbalen ning Malolos), is a component city and capital of the province of Bulacan, Philippines. According to the 2024 census, it has a population of 269,809 people. It is the capital city of the province of Bulacan as the seat of the provincial government.

It was the site of the constitutional convention of 1898, known as the Malolos Convention, that led to the establishment of the First Philippine Republic led by Emilio Aguinaldo, at the sanctuary of the Barasoain Church. The convent of the Malolos Cathedral served as the presidential palace at that time. The First Philippine Republic is sometimes characterized as the first proper constitutional republic in Asia, although there were several Asian republics predating it – for example, the Mahajanapadas of ancient India, the Lanfang Republic, the Republic of Formosa, or the Republic of Ezo. Aguinaldo himself had led a number of governments prior to Malolos, like those established at Tejeros and Biak-na-Bato which both styled themselves República de Filipinas ("Republic of the Philippines"). Unlike the founding documents of those governments, however, the Malolos Constitution was duly approved by a partially elected congress and called for a true representative democracy.

== History ==
Miguel Lopez de Legazpi conquered the 8 villages along Malolos River and integrated it into one entity dated November 14, 1571, and constituted it as an Encomienda de Malolos the Adelantado entrusted the settlements to conquistador Don Marcos de Herrera. On April 5, 1572, Legazpi merges the encomiendas of Malolos and Calumpit into a single entity to form a new town of Calumpit with Juan Moron and Herrera as co-encomenderos.

On April 15, 1572, Legazpi entrusted 6 villages along Atlag River and given it to Don Jeronimo Tirado.

Nine years later, Malolos was officially established as a town and included it in Bulacan and dismembered on Alcaldia de Calumpit on June 11, 1580, and accepted as priory with Fray Matheo de Mendoza as its first minister in an Augustinian Council held in Tondo Convent but the civil administration still belongs to its encomendero at that time, Don Jeronimo Tirado.

The Tagalog constituted the majority of the Malolos populace although it is said that the town had a Kapampangan origin; the name Malolos is a Spanish pronunciation of Kapampangan word maluslús. They were led by prominent families, among them are descendants of the royal clans of Gatbontons, Gatmaitan, Gatsalian (Gatchalian), Dimagiba, Lakandola, Ladia and Lacancale and in the 17th-19th centuries, Chinese Filipino families through Tondo and Binondo, such as Chichioco, Cojuangco, Chiong, Chico, Cunanan, Tantocos, Tanchangco, Tanjosoy, Tengco, Tenjeco, Tiongson, Lomotan, Manahan, joined by Spanish Filipino families of Adriano, Bautista, Jacinto, Reyes, Santos, Rustia, de Leon, Agustin, Vasquez, Valenzuela, Crisostomo and Estrella.

Chinese Filipino traders settled in Malolos starting in 1670 for economic opportunity. The settlers increased, and Malolos began engaging with textile, rice production. However, the Chinese are expelled from the town on June 30, 1755, due to political and social issues.

On August 31, 1859, Malolos was divided into three independent towns; "Malolos", "Barasoain", and "Santa Isabel". These new towns are former districts of Malolos, with own respective Presidente Municipal and Parish priests. With the beginning of American rule in 1903, these towns were again reunited into a single municipality. The two other districts became barangays under the political jurisdiction of Malolos.

A major factor in the progress of Malolos was the opening of the Manila–Dagupan railways in April 1892.

Malolos was first organized into a formal municipal unit in 1822 when the first "alcalde constitucional" or municipal head was appointed. He was Jorge de Victoria, a Filipino, who like all succeeding "alcaldes", served for one year. He was followed by thirty-one other "alcaldes", with Juan Dimagiba as the thirty-first. In 1859, Malolos was subdivided into three administrative districts; Malolos, Barasoain and Santa Isabel. Juan Dimagiba became the first "alcalde" of the down-scaled Malolos. There were 12 others who served as "alcaldes" from 1859 to 1879, the first one being Mariano C. Cristobal and the second being Capitan Tomas Tanchanco, whose term marked the start of civil turmoil in the town.

=== Philippine Republic ===
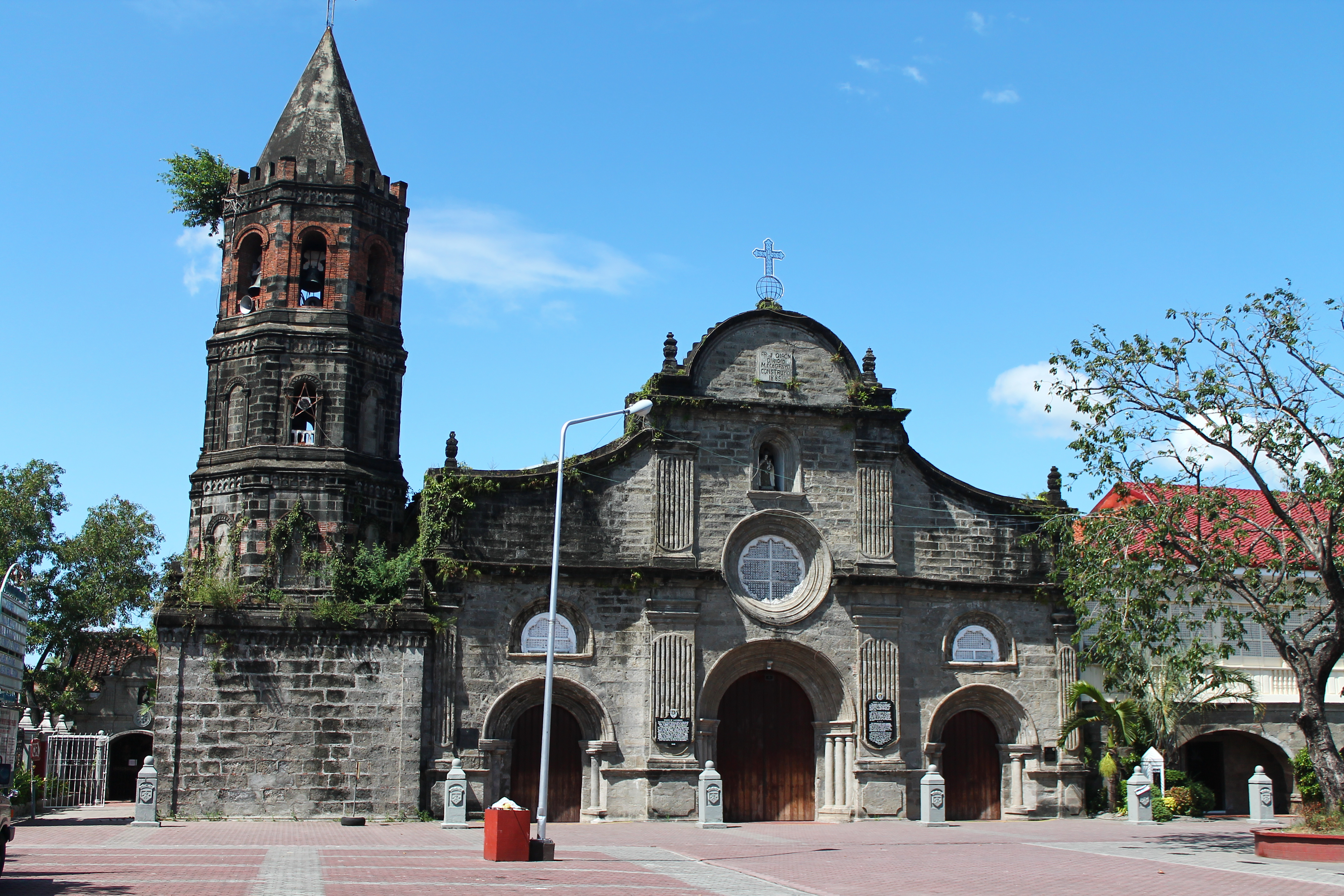
The Barasoain Church

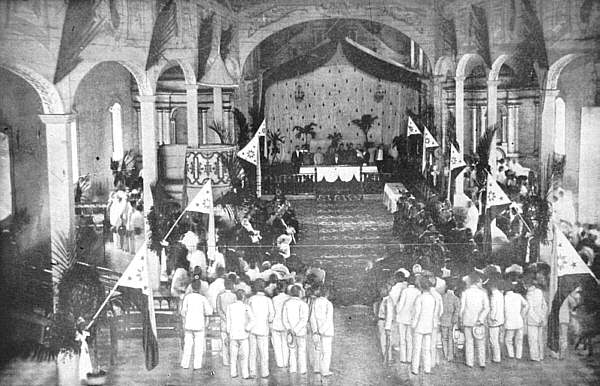
The Malolos Congress of 1899 in session

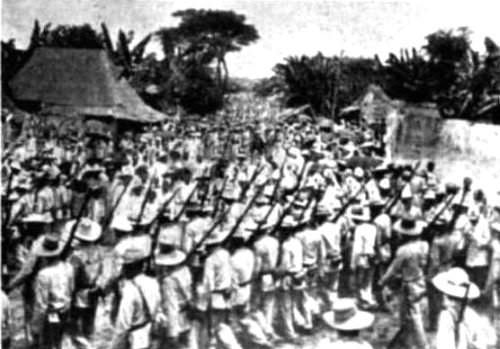
Filipino soldiers in Malolos, 1899

Malolos is the historical site of the constitutional convention of 1898 that led to the establishment of the First Philippine Republic, the first republic in Asia, led by Emilio Aguinaldo. Malolos served as the capital of the short-lived republic from 1898 to 1899. In 1899, after the Malolos Constitution was ratified, the Universidad Scientifico Literaria de Filipinas was established in Malolos, Bulacan. It offered Law as well as Medicine, Surgery and Notary Public; Academia Militar,(the Philippine's First Military School) which was established on October 25, 1898; and The Burgos Institute, (the Philippine's first law school) and an exclusive school for boys.

The Congress of the Revolutionary Government of the Philippines convened in Barasoain Church in Malolos on September 15, 1898. On the 18th, Aguinaldo proclaimed Malolos as the capital of the Philippines. The first important act of the Congress was the ratification on September 29, 1898, of the independence proclamation at Kawit, Cavite of June 12, 1898. On October 19, 1898, by virtue of an act of Congress, the Universidad Literaria de Filipinas was established. It was also in Malolos on December 20, 1898, that General Emilio Aguinaldo declared December 30 of every year as a day of national mourning.

Arguably, the greatest achievement and for which the Malolos Congress was known was the framing of the Malolos Constitution, prepared by a committee headed by Felipe Calderón, was approved by the congress after amendments have been made on January 20, 1899, sanctioned by Aguinaldo the next day and promulgated on January 22. The last congressional act of the Malolos Congress was the inauguration of the Philippine Republic with Aguinaldo as the President on January 23, 1899, amidst the people's jubilation.

On March 31, 1899, at the height of the Philippine–American War, Aguinaldo ordered General Antonio Luna to set the Malolos Church including its huge silver altar on fire as part of their strategy called "Scorched Earth Policy" where everything will be rendered useless. Malolos was destroyed when the Americans captured the capital. Aguinaldo escaped to San Fernando, Pampanga before the American Forces arrived at Malolos.

=== Malolos as the capital of Bulacan ===
More than a year after the 1899 Battle of Malolos and the victory of and occupation by American forces, the national seat of power was officially conferred again to Manila and on February 27, 1901, by the virtue of Act No. 88 of the Philippine Commission, the commission officially transferred the provincial seat from the heavily damaged town of Bulakan to the nearby town of Malolos and it became the capital of Bulacan. On January 12, 1904, by virtue of Act No. 1038, the former municipalities of Barasoain and Santa Isabel were merged with Malolos, with Barasoain designated as the municipal seat.

The Casa Presidencia de Malolos was converted as the new Casa Real of Bulacan (became Casa Real Shrine) making it as the new Official Office and Residence of Governor until 1930 when the new Provincial Capitol Building in Barrio Guinhawa, also in Malolos was built.

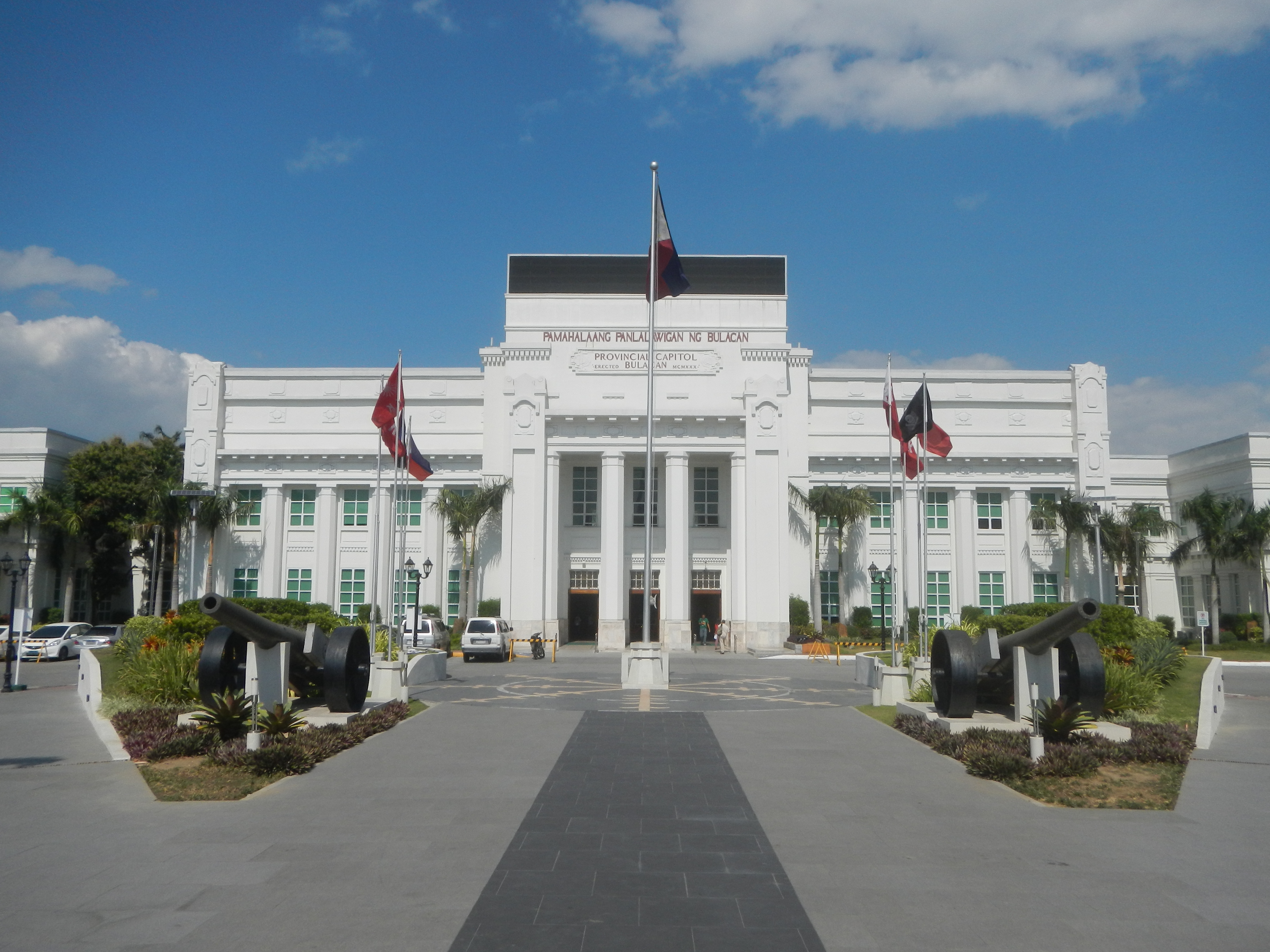
Bulacan Provincial Capitol in Malolos, built in 1930

=== During the American Period ===
After the War, the Americans appointed a martial law administrator in the person of Jose Reyes Tiongson. He served as "presidente politico militar" from 1901 to 1902. With the capture of Aguinaldo in Palanan, Isabela and the defeat of most of the Filipino armed forces all over the country, the Americans began to put up a network of local government units. The municipality of Malolos was re-organized, composed of the districts of Malolos, Barasoain and Santa Isabel. Appointed "presidente municipal" or town mayor was Ramon Gonzalez de Leon of Sitio Tampoy, one of the original members of the Katipunan Balangay Apuy. He was in the post for two years, 1903 to 1905. He and the nine others who followed him were all appointive officials. When the Philippines became a commonwealth, Leon Valencia was elected mayor in 1937, the first ever elected. Diosdado Dimagiba succeeded him in 1940 but had to vacate the position because of the Japanese conquest. Also in this period, the Malolos Municipal Hall facing the Malolos Church was built, in a manner of Neo-Classical Roman Style.

=== During the Japanese Occupation ===
The Japanese appointed two "punong bayan" or mayors, Luis Peralta and Ignacio Tapang. After the joint US and Philippine Commonwealth armed forces liberated Malolos in March 1945, Adonis P. Maclang of the guerrillas' Bulacan Military Area was appointed guerrilla mayor of the town, before battle for the liberation of Bulacan, the local Filipino forces of the 3rd and 32nd Infantry Division of the Philippine Commonwealth Army and 3rd Constabulary Regiment of the Philippine Constabulary was liberated in Malolos to helping the local guerrilla resistance fighters of the Bulacan Guerrilla Unit and American troops of the U.S. Army against the Japanese in 1945 at the end of World War II, followed by the appointment of Isberto Crisostomo as civilian town mayor in 1946. The first post-war election was held in 1946 and Carlos Maclang was elected mayor.

=== Malolos Before Martial Law (1960–1972) ===
During the decade preceding the declaration of Martial Law, Malolos was the provincial capital of Bulacan and a growing town with economic activities connected to agriculture, fishing, and local commerce. Census records show that its population increased from 48,968 in 1960 to 73,996 in 1970, indicating substantial population growth during the period. The town's agricultural and fisheries sectors were also reflected in government legislation. On June 18, 1966, Republic Act No. 4710 was approved, providing for the establishment of a marine fishery school and laboratory in Malolos and authorizing an initial appropriation of ₱350,000 for fiscal year 1967. These records document the town's demographic growth and the importance of fisheries education before the political changes of the 1970s.

=== Malolos During Martial Law (1972–1986) ===
The declaration of Martial Law in 1972 brought changes to the national political environment, including restrictions on media and political opposition. In Bulacan, the experiences of activists and rural communities form part of the documented history of this period. In June 1982, five young organizers associated with efforts to establish a local chapter of the Alyansa ng Magbubukid sa Gitnang Luson were arrested by soldiers while meeting at a farmer's house in Pulilan. Their bodies were found the following day in San Rafael. The five, later known as the Bulacan Martyrs, were Danilo Aguirre, Edwin de Guzman Borlongan, Teresita Evangelista Llorente, Renato Turla Manimbo, and Constantino Reyes Medina. Borlongan was from Malolos, and a funeral Mass for three of the victims whose bodies were recovered later was held at Barasoain Church in Malolos. Their deaths prompted church and human rights groups in Bulacan to call for justice.

Malolos also figured in the events leading to the end of the Marcos administration in February 1986. The Radyo Veritas transmitter station in Malolos was used to broadcast Cardinal Jaime Sin's appeal on February 22 for Filipinos to support the military officers who had broken with the Marcos government and to gather along Epifanio de los Santos Avenue (EDSA). On February 23, armed men attacked the transmitter station and destroyed broadcasting equipment, interrupting its signal. The station's role and the attack on its Malolos transmitter are documented in an account published by the Diocese of Malolos. These events connect the town to the wider political developments that culminated in the 1986 People Power Revolution.

=== Contemporary history ===
On June 30, 1998, Malolos was the site again for another presidential inauguration, this time of Joseph Estrada when he was inaugurated at Barasoain Church as the 13th President of the Philippines. Estrada, whose real surname is Ejercito, traced his ancestry to the Ejercitos who were prominent in the history of Malolos.

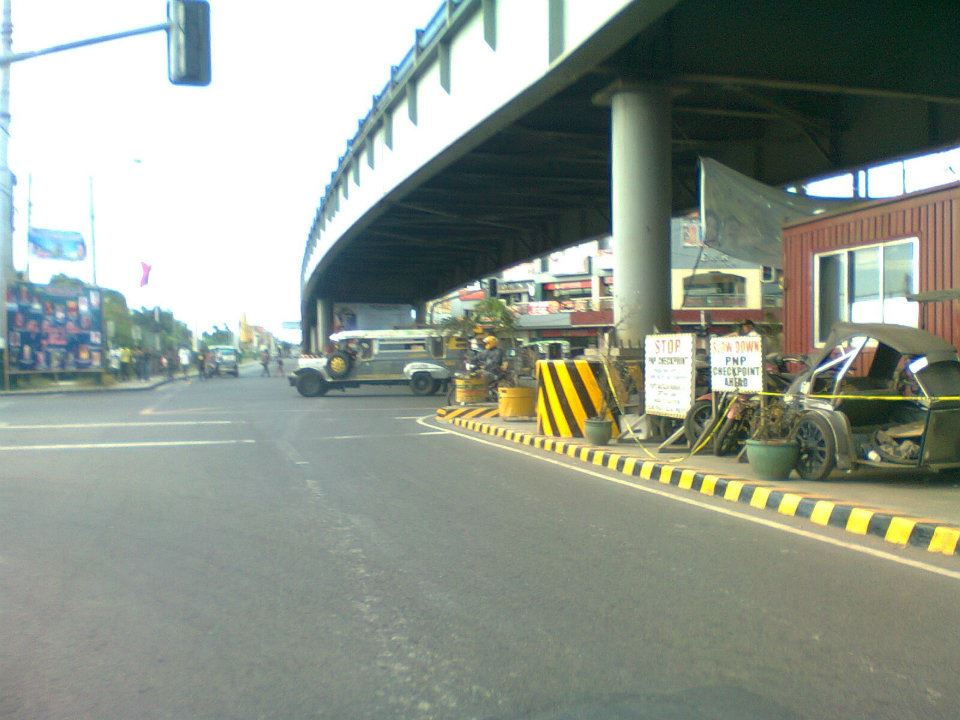
The Malolos Steel Flyover

The construction of the Malolos flyover in summer of 2004 marked a new milestone being the first in the city. The structure, part of the former Philippine President Gloria Macapagal Arroyo's Bridge Program, was constructed in a record-breaking 60 days only according to the Department of Public Works and Highways. The structure was built to solve daily traffic jams, which have become a bane to motorists and to employees in both private and government offices in the city. This remarkable feat hastened not only the city's development in commerce and trade but also that of its neighboring municipalities as well.

On July 28–30, 2008, the city hosted the first National Conference for Philippine-Spanish Relations. This is a project of both the Province of Bulacan's research arm, the Center for Bulacan Studies of Bulacan State University, and by the Samahang Pangkasaysayan ng Bulacan, Incorporated.

=== Cityhood ===
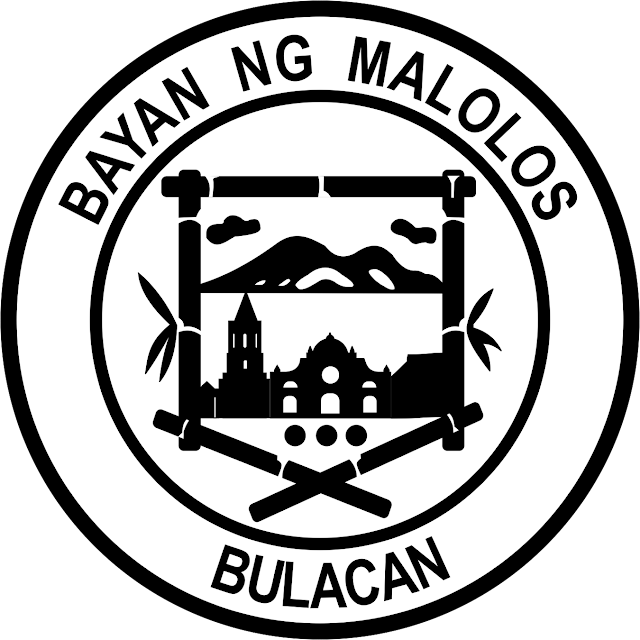
Seal of Malolos before its affirmed cityhood in 2002

In February 1999, Bulacan's 1st congressional district representative Wilhelmino Sy-Alvarado authored a bill converting the then-municipality of Malolos into a component city, which was approved as Republic Act No. 8754 on November 4. The plebiscite for the ratification, along with that for Tuguegarao, Cagayan (whose cityhood was approved through RA No. 8755), was scheduled on December 18.

A plebiscite was conducted in 402 precincts in 51 barangays; wherein residents rejected the cityhood bid. However, it was marred by a number of alleged irregularities including improper counting of votes; the reason mayor Restituto Roque, along with two other individuals, on December 29, filed an electoral protest before the Commission on Elections, seeking the nullification of the plebiscite results and asking for a recount.

Malolos cityhood plebiscite
Choice	1999 plebiscite		2002 recount	
Choice	Votes	%	Votes	%
Yes	9,321	44.69%	10,746	56.12%
No	11,535	55.31%	8,402	43.88%
Result	No		Yes	
Valid votes	20,856	100%	19,148	100%
Voter turnout	Around 20%–25% of an estimated 80,000 registered voters.			

After a recount, on October 8, 2002, the COMELEC Second Division, favoring the petition, declared the ratification of the charter and reversed the earlier official vote count, through its Resolution on Election Protest Case No. 99–2. It was said that several ballots were written by a person, while others were missing.

Malolos eventually became the second town in Bulacan to be a city, following San Jose del Monte. Danilo Domingo, who had opposed the cityhood and defeated Roque in the 2001 elections, became the first city mayor.

In 2010, the city government, through the City Ordinance No. 24-2010, declared December 18 of every year to be the celebration of the cityhood.

=== Invalidation of the Lone District of Malolos Act ===
Legislative bills were filed in the 14th Congress in 2007 to create a separate, lone legislative district for Malolos. House Bill No. 3162 was filed on November 27, 2007 by Bulacan first district representative Ma. Victoria Sy-Alvarado; it was converted to HB No. 3693, filed on March 4, 2008, also by Sy-Alvarado, and was passed by the House of Representatives on April 29. Meanwhile, Senate Bill No. 1986, filed on December 19, 2007 by Senator Mar Roxas. On October 6, 2008, the same day the committee report was issued, the bill was sponsored by Senator Benigno Aquino III and co-sponsored by Senators Roxas and Richard Gordon. The bill was passed by the Senate on February 16, 2009.

On May 1, 2009, the bill lapsed into law as Republic Act No. 9591 without the president's signature, amending the city charter (RA No. 8754).

In August, the Commission on Elections (COMELEC) issued Resolution No. 09-0544, on the allocation of a legislative district for Malolos, concerning the said law.

However, on June 16, four individuals from the city had filed a petition, with the COMELEC as respondent, questioning the constitutionality of RA No. 9591 which violated the 1987 Constitution and its Ordinance; both require a population of at least 250,000 for a city to have its own representative in Congress.

On January 25, 2010, the Supreme Court voted, 7–6, to grant the petition, nullifying RA No. 9591. The court cited the failure to show official records that the city's population would reach that number in time for the May elections.

At the time the legislative bills were filed, the city's population was 223,069. The court explained that HB No. 3693 cited an undated erroneous certification on demographic projections, issued by an unauthorized National Statistics Office personnel; while they used the city's annual population growth rate of 3.78% between 1995 and 2000 as basis for the law, their projected population in 2010 would be at least fifty thousand more than what is required, contrary to the court's projection that the required number would be reached only by August.

The ruling was affirmed on March 9. The city was then reverted to Bulacan's first legislative district, which also currently comprises five municipalities. At that time, the province was represented in Congress through four districts.

In 2015, Sy-Alvarado filed another bill, House Bill No. 655. Domingo, currently serving as district representative, expressed his support.

== Geography ==
Malolos is 45 kilometers (28 mi) north of Manila, the capital city of the Philippines. It is one of the major suburbs conurbated to Metro Manila, situated in the southwestern part of Bulacan, in the Central Luzon Region (Region 3) in the island of Luzon and part of the Metro Luzon Urban Beltway Super Region.

It is bounded by municipalities of Calumpit on northwest, Plaridel on north, Guiguinto on east, Paombong on west, Bulakan on the southeast and Manila Bay on the south.

=== Topography ===
Malolos is relatively flat of about 0.81% to a gently sloping of 2.17%. The slope of the land descends towards west, southwest to southern direction. The highest land elevation is at about 6.0 m (19.7 ft) above sea level while the lowest is only 0.5 m (1 ft 8 in) below sea level. A network of natural waterways and rivers of various sizes and importance is traversing through the landscape of the town down south to Manila Bay.

There are three soil types from the major type of Malolos, the soils of the alluvial landscape and these are the Quingua Series, San Manuel Series and the Tagulod Series. Other soil types comprised in the soil map of Malolos are the Matimbo Series and Masantol Series, which belong to the soils of the coastal landscape, Loamy Tidal Swamp and Mucky Tidal Swamp from the miscellaneous soil types.

=== Climate ===
Under the Köppen climate classification system, Malolos has a tropical wet and dry climate (Köppen Aw). Malolos belongs to Type 1 category of the Philippine Climate Corona Classification, which has two pronounced seasons, i.e., wet and dry seasons: wet during the months of June to November and dry from December to May.

The northwest monsoon prevails over the area from October to January bringing in moderate and light rains, the last trade winds predominate from February to April but the high Sierra Madre Mountains interfere with the free circulation of making the area dry with almost no rains during the period, while from May to September the southwest monsoon prevail with strong winds and abundant rainfall, and generally associated with strong typhoon.

Climate data for Malolos, Bulacan
Month	Jan	Feb	Mar	Apr	May	Jun	Jul	Aug	Sep	Oct	Nov	Dec	Year
Mean daily maximum °C (°F)	28 (82)	30 (86)	32 (90)	33 (91)	33 (91)	31 (88)	30 (86)	30 (86)	30 (86)	30 (86)	30 (86)	29 (84)	31 (87)
Mean daily minimum °C (°F)	22 (72)	22 (72)	23 (73)	25 (77)	26 (79)	26 (79)	25 (77)	25 (77)	25 (77)	24 (75)	24 (75)	23 (73)	24 (76)
Average precipitation mm (inches)	45.7 (1.80)	21.3 (0.84)	17.9 (0.70)	33.1 (1.30)	119.3 (4.70)	240.3 (9.46)	382.3 (15.05)	298.6 (11.76)	339.8 (13.38)	193.1 (7.60)	78 (3.1)	126.4 (4.98)	1,895.8 (74.67)
Average rainy days	3	2	3	3	12	19	24	22	20	12	5	6	131
Source: World Weather Online

=== Barangays ===
Malolos is politically subdivided into 51 barangays - as shown in the matrix below - spread over a land area of 7,725 hectares (19,090 acres) consisting of agricultural, commercial, industrial, residential, bodies of water, fishponds, marshes and roads. Many of the name of the barangays were derived from the name of common Philippine trees, because Malolos was once a vast virgin land and forests, before the Spaniards came and Christianized the natives. While others were named in honor of their patron saints.

Each barangay consists of puroks and some have sitios.

Barangays of the City of Malolos
Map	Barangay^{1}	Population (2000)^{2}	Population (2007)^{3}	Population (2010)	Population (2015)	May 1, 2020
	Anilao	2,339	4,520	2,999	3,078	3,013
	Atlag	4,635	5,028	5,101	5,294	4,675
	Babatnin	788	817	969	958	741
	Bagna	4,368	5,427	5,061	5,321	4,947
	Bagong Bayan	3,055	3,528	3,489	3,688	3,068
	Balayong	1,889	2,532	3,059	3,338	3,549
	Balite	2,017	2,425	2,579	2,813	3,468
	Bangkal	261	8,803	11,030	12,437	12,322
	Barihan	4,587	5,660	5,404	5,833	5,852
	Bulihan	10,235	12,732	13,134	13,510	15,865
	Bungahan	1,983	2,461	2,731	2,965	3,025
	Caingin	5,804	7,874	6,867	6,899	7,348
	Calero	988	1,131	1,214	1,281	1,316
	Caliligawan	211	342	428	302	498
	Canalate	3,560	3,719	4,015	4,124	3,632
	Caniogan	5,039	5,158	5,239	5,132	5,219
	Catmon	1,961	1,828	1,988	3,282	2,248
	Cofradia	3,183	4,853	3,815	3,937	4,608
	Dakila	4,851	4,288	5,146	5,352	6,806
	Guinhawa	1,686	1,446	3,003	4,086	4,217
	Ligas	4,354	5,891	6,119	6,624	6,656
	Liang	1,248	1,575	1,564	1,661	1,338
	Longos	7,700	10,808	11,361	14,864	16,999
	Look 1st	4,788	5,922	5,614	6,808	9,611
	Look 2nd	1,877	2,485	2,610	3,108	3,081
	Lugam	3,012	3,966	4,355	4,711	4,744
	Mabolo	4,870	6,202	6,399	6,435	6,281
	Mambog	2,384	2,748	2,344	2,673	2,836
	Masile	790	744	884	832	772
	Matimbo	5,685	6,254	6,455	6,516	6,649
	Mojon	12,559	15,541	17,261	18,239	16,169
	Namayan	738	856	872	771	712
	Niugan	456	556	572	828	715
	Pamarawan	2,660	2,861	3,425	3,336	3,094
	Panasahan	6,874	8,024	8,612	8,818	9,484
	Pinagbakahan	1,617	3,816	5,653	6,087	7,563
	San Agustin	1,821	2,090	2,202	2,262	1,945
	San Gabriel	1,947	2,578	2,234	2,467	2,012
	San Juan	2,897	3,439	4,326	4,388	4,566
	San Pablo	4,958	4,954	5,035	5,240	4,991
	San Vicente (Poblacion)	1,981	2,007	2,529	2,790	2,402
	Santiago	1,771	1,875	1,972	1,973	1,534
	Santisima Trinidad	4,658	6,111	6,384	6,524	6,688
	Santo Cristo	1,730	1,714	1,929	2,025	2,035
	Santo Niño (Poblacion)	641	453	532	561	574
	Santo Rosario (Poblacion)	7,065	7,211	7,593	7,633	7,333
	Santor	3,285	6,868	8,046	8,646	8,550
	Sumapang Bata	1,600	2,087	2,424	2,645	2,442
	Sumapang Matanda	6,272	7,696	7,258	7,554	8,719
	Taal	1,868	2,101	2,118	2,231	1,677
	Tikay	7,745	9,064	8,992	10,094	12,600
Footnotes: ^1 Source: Philippine Statistics Authority; ^2 From NSO 2000 Census.; ^3 From NSO 2007 Census.; ^4 Source: Philippine Statistic Authority.

== Demographics ==
Population census of Malolos
Year	Pop.	±% p.a.
1903	27,025	—
1918	26,109	−0.23%
1939	33,384	+1.18%
1948	38,779	+1.68%
1960	48,968	+1.96%
1970	73,996	+4.21%
1975	83,491	+2.45%
1980	95,699	+2.77%
1990	125,178	+2.72%
1995	147,414	+3.11%
2000	175,291	+3.78%
2007	225,244	+3.52%
2010	234,945	+1.55%
2015	252,074	+1.35%
2020	261,189	+0.75%
2024	269,809	+0.78%
Source: Philippine Statistics Authority

As of 2015, the Philippine Statistics Authority released the official result of 2015 census in which Malolos has a population of 261,189 people, with a density of 3,900 inhabitants per square kilometer or 10,000 inhabitants per square mile, an increase of 17,129 people from the 2010 census. There are 52,547 households in the city. Majority of the Malolos households usually lives along the major roads. It has an average crime rate of 6.28% and has a crime solution efficiency of 97.11%.

=== Language and ethnicity ===
The majority of the Maloleños (or Malolenyo in Filipino) traces their roots to Tagalog ethnicity although there are also Kapampangan and other ethnicities who migrated to the city. The vernacular language is Filipino, in the form of Tagalog, while Philippine English is the language most widely used in education and business throughout the city. Although Malolos is the city where the Filipinos established the Spanish as their only official language in the first constitution, the native speakers of Spanish still alive are reduced to the very old members of a handful of families.

=== Religion ===
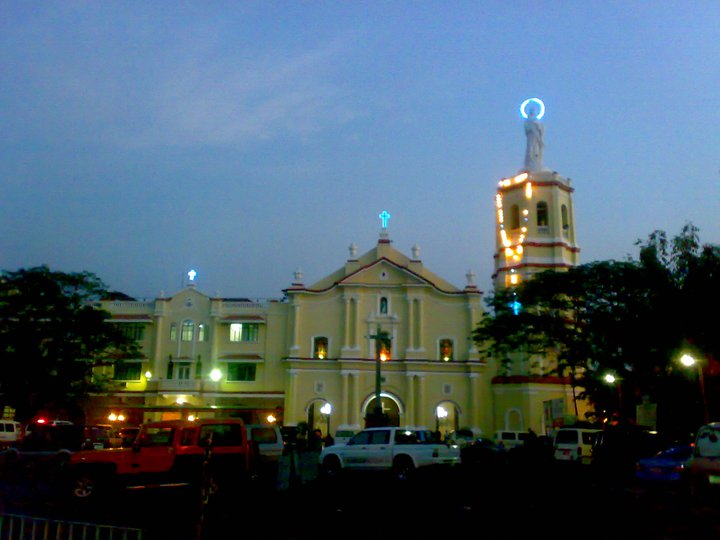
Malolos Cathedral-Basilica, the principal church of the city and the Province of Bulacan

Santa Isabel de Hungaria Church, built in 1673 as visita of Malolos and became Parish in 1859

The Christianization of Malolos was done by the Augustinian Order in May 1572 thru the effort of Fray Diego Vivar-Ordonez (parochial vicar of Calumpit, assistant to Fray Diego Herrera and Martin de Rada) and it became one of the visitas of Parish of Nicolas de Tolentino (became San Juan Bautista in 1576). Since 1572 the apostolic administration in Malolos was under the Convent of Calumpit. On June 11, 1580, the mission chapel was accepted by the Augustinians as House of Order and became Iglesia Convento y Malolos with visitas of Paombong, Matimbo, Mambog and Quingua in 1581. Later due to the frequent high tides that submerged the area, the friars moved the church to its present location in Poblacion in 1590 under the curate Fray Cristobal Tarique, where they started to build a church made of light materials and wood. In 1599 Fray Roque de Barrionuevo started to build a church made of stone and it was finished in 1673. The majority of the residents are Christians. Roman Catholic is the predominant religion in the city.

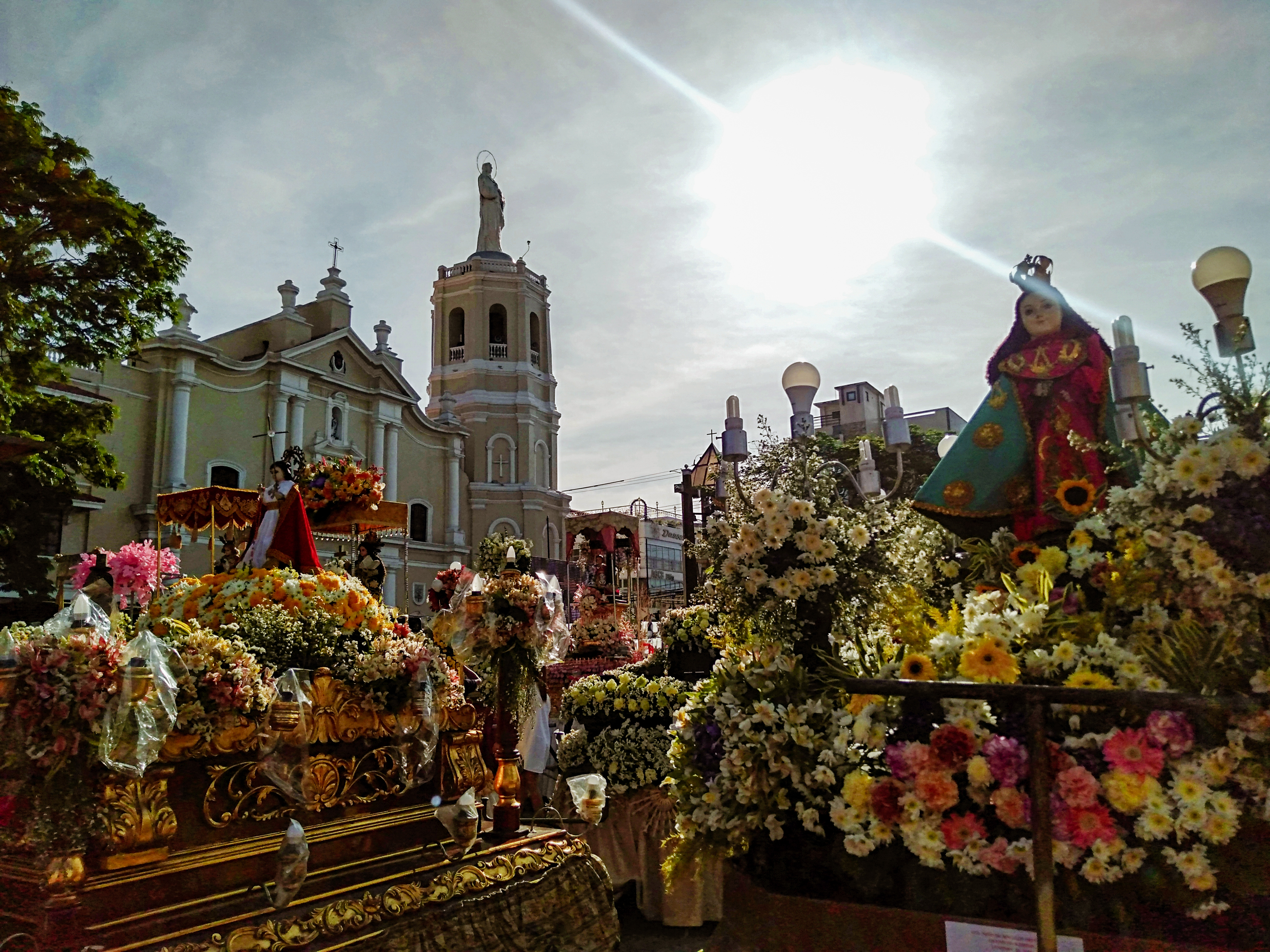
Feast of Sto. Niño de Malolos

Until today, the Roman Catholic faith in Malolos remained intensive. It is evident through the existence of the three stone churches. (Malolos Cathedral, Barasoain Church, and the Santa Isabel Church) Being predominantly Catholic, Malolos, together with the whole province of Bulacan is constituted as Vicaria dela Immaculada Concepcion in which the (Cura de Malolos is the Vicar Forane). It was part of the Archdiocese of Manila until March 11, 1962, when Pope John XXIII created the Diocese of Malolos making the Malolos Church its cathedral. In March 2012 the Diocese of Malolos will celebrate its 50th anniversary. It was highlighted by the Canonical Coronation of the patroness and queen of the city and the whole province, Virgen Inmaculada Concepción de Malolos enshrined at the cathedral's altar.

Other Christian religious groups, such as Methodists, Aglipayans, Adventists, Baptists, Mormons, and other Protestant churches, as well as Nontrinitarian churches (like Members Church of God International, Iglesia ni Cristo, and Jehovah's Witness) can be found in the city.

Islam (Muslims) could also be found in the city.

== Economy ==
Poverty incidence of Malolos (%)

Source: Philippine Statistics Authority

=== Commerce ===
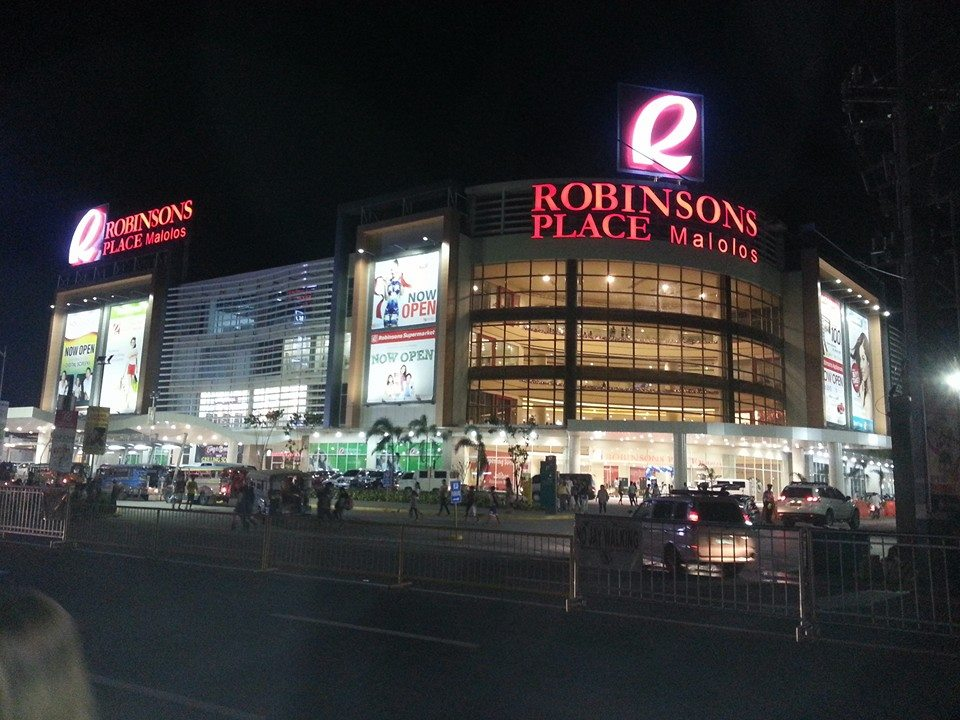
Robinsons Place Malolos

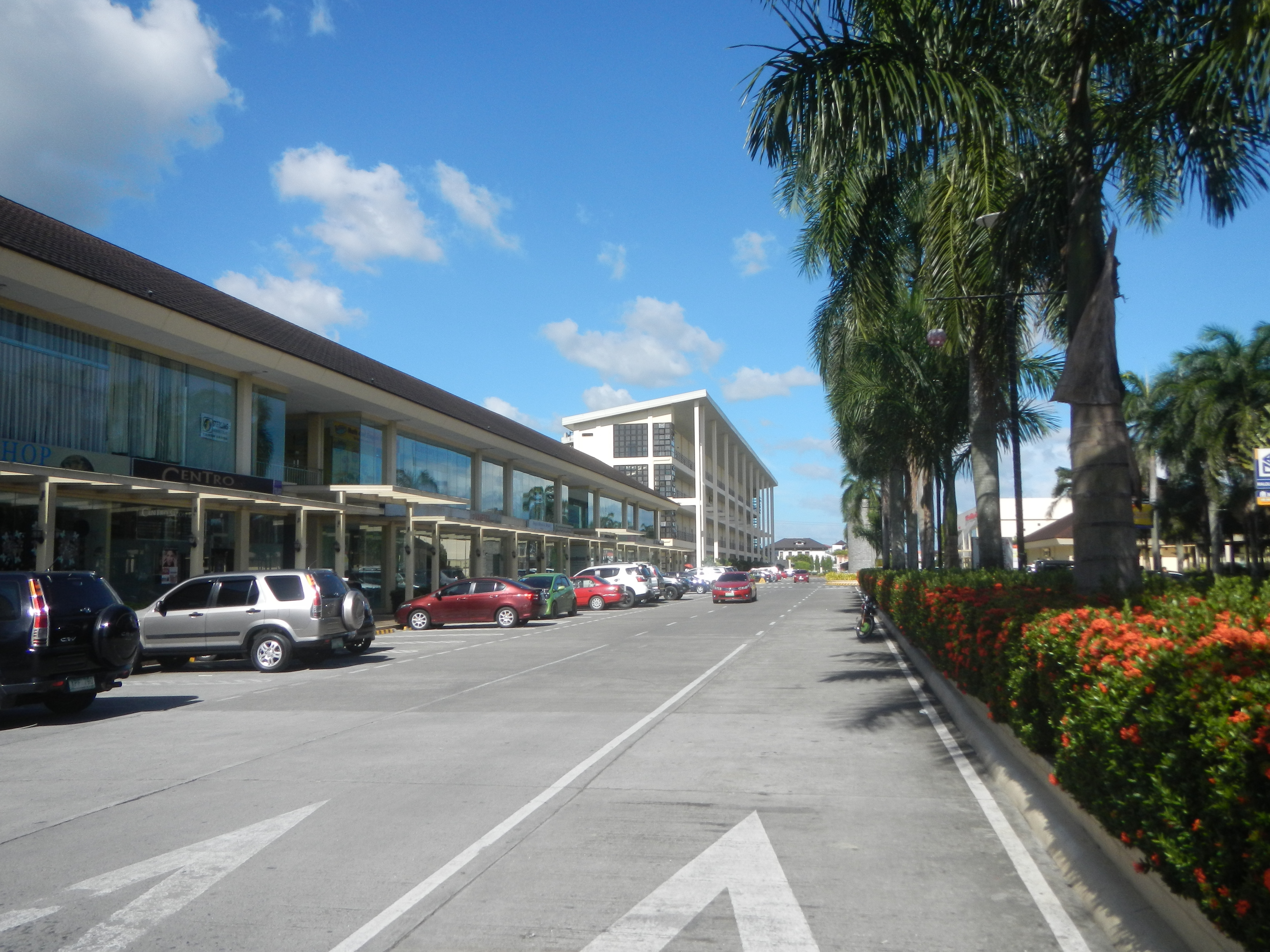
The Cabanas Malolos

The City of Malolos is quickly becoming commercialized due to its proximity to Metro Manila and for lying between Manila and Clark, Pampanga. Many corporations have put up commercial sites and banking establishments in various places around the city. Many of the businesses and industries in the city include Banking; Business Process Outsourcing; Courier Service; Education; Food Service; Hospitals; Hotels, Resorts & Restaurants; Information and Communications Technology; Insurance; Manpower; Realty/Real Property Development; Trade; Transport Services; Travel & Tours; and other services. Robinsons Place Malolos is a major shopping mall owned and operated by Robinsons Malls, the Philippines' second largest mall operator. The mall is located along MacArthur Highway, Barangay Sumapang Matanda. Other shopping malls in Malolos include the Maunlad Malls 1 and 2, both owned and operated by the Union Bank of the Philippines, Graceland Mall, owned and operated by RMR Group of Companies, Vista Mall, Waltermart and Bulacan Eco-Commercial Complex, owned by the Provincial Government of Bulacan.

Chimera Land is an amusement park under construction located in Barangay Sumapang Matanda. Once complete, it will be the first sustainable themed park in the Philippines.

Malolos also serves as the Banking Capital of Bulacan, having the highest number of banking institutions in the province (the city hosts around 46), majority of these are located prominent areas of the city, particularly along Paseo del Congreso Avenue.

=== Industry ===
Due to its close proximity in Manila and its port, Malolos becomes industrialized. Industrial estates, such as First Bulacan Industrial City, where are more than 20 corporations and companies operating their factories inside the estate are a boom. Mighty Corporation, a major player in the Philippine tobacco industry, operates a tobacco factory in the city.

Other industries such as agribusiness, aquaculture, bag making, ceramics, construction, cement making, flowers/ornamentals, furniture, food processing, garments, gifts, houseware making, decor making, jewelry, leather tanning, marble polishing, metallurgy, printing, shoe manufacturing, and textile manufacturing are also present in the city.

Some of the food products produced in Malolos include Empanada de Kaliskis, Ensaymada Malolos, Inipit, Otap Bread, Atsara, and Bagoong.

== Infrastructure ==
=== Transportation ===
Public transportation in Malolos is served by buses, jeepneys, and UV Express AUVs. The city is also served by Tricycles, which offer their services on a for-hire basis. A bus stop located in Malolos Crossing is served by provincial buses operated by Baliwag Transit, First North Luzon Transit, and Victory Liner to Cubao and Monumento. Robinsons Place Malolos is the terminus of Point-to-point buses from Trinoma, and modernized jeepneys from San Fernando, Pampanga.

Malolos is known for its Karatig Jeepneys which serves as an intra-city public transportation. The name itself came from the word karatig, which means nearby places or barangays. The Karatig jeepney is the smaller version of the jeepneys which usually have the size of about 3-meters long and can board 8-10 commuters at the back plus 2 passengers in the front seat. Longer models can accommodate about 10–12. Its capacity varies according to the jeep's length and size. There are two Karatig routes around Malolos.

There was a railway service in the city served by the Philippine National Railways (PNR). Estacion Ferrocaril de Malolos is part of Ferrocaril de Manila-Dagupan. It was named Estacion de Barasoain Y Malolos. The original was destroyed in 1945, and was replaced with the current one. Malolos was opened on March 24, 1891. Services from Manila to Dagupan commenced on November 24, 1892. It was later abandoned after the ending of northbound services by the Philippine National Railways (PNR).

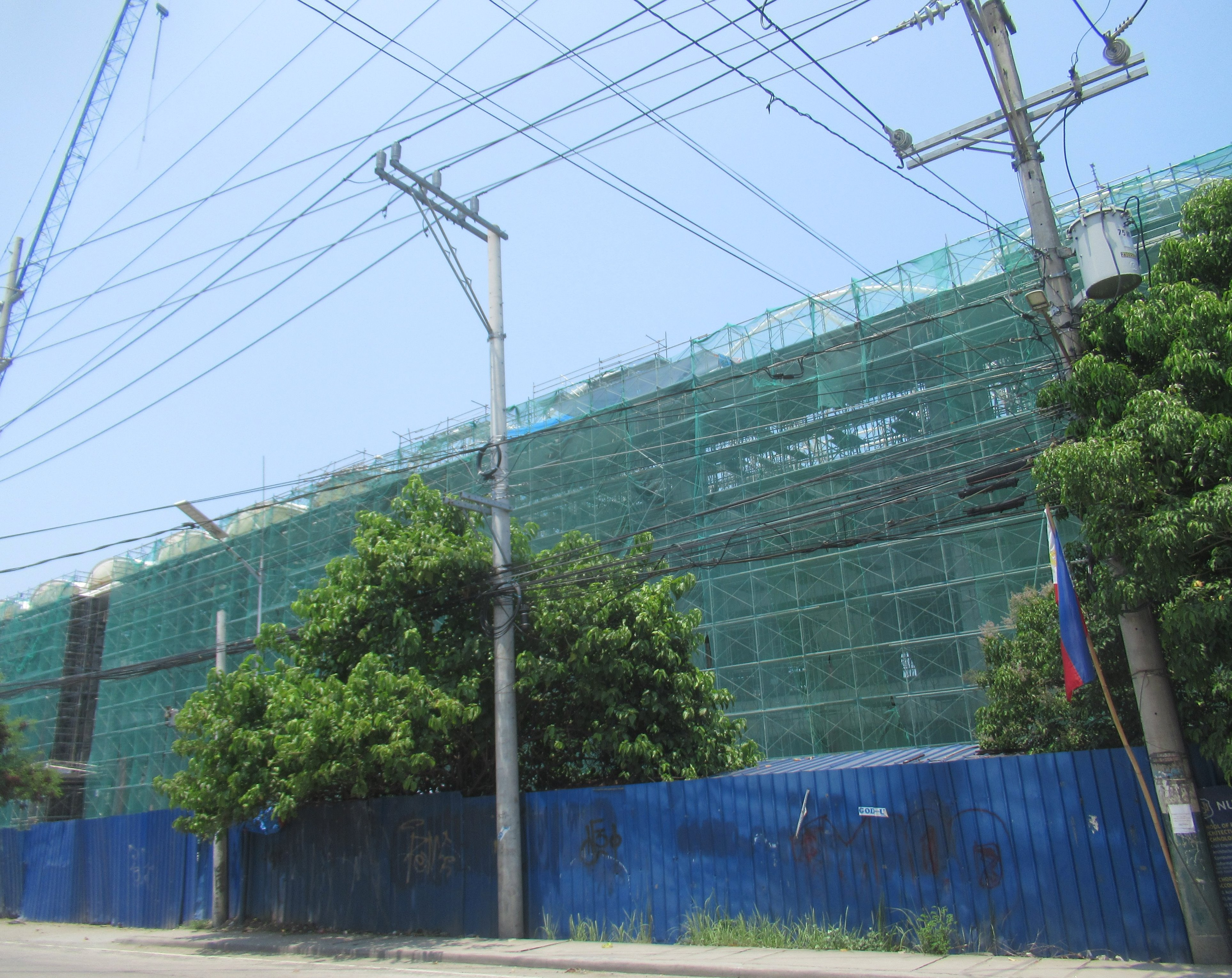
New Malolos station construction (2024)

However, in 1988 the North Main Line of the PNR was closed and train services in Malolos ceased immediately. On November 20, 2003, in an attempt to revive the railway service, North Luzon Railways Corporation and China National Machinery and Equipment Group (CNMEG) executed a Contract Agreement for the construction of Section I, Phase I of the North Luzon Railway System from Caloocan to Malolos on a turnkey basis. The project was worth $421,050,000. However, on February 13, 2006, a controversy arose from the project and the project was placed on halt indefinitely. In 2017, the project was revived and was called North South Commuter Railway with funds sourced from Japan through a loan. On January 5, 2018, the Department of Transportation broke ground for the first phase of the PNR Clark Line. The New Malolos station of the Malolos Historic Town Center is currently being rebuilt as part of the North–South Commuter Railway project.

When re-opened, the Malolos Station will serve as the temporary terminus until the completion of PNR Clark 2.

=== Utilities ===
Water services are provided by the City of Malolos Water District (CMWD). The CMWD also provide water services on some barangays in the neighboring towns of Paombong and Hagonoy. Since 2012, the city is suffering from recurring water shortages. Electric services are provided by Meralco, the sole electric power distributor in Malolos.

== Government ==
=== Local government ===
The city of Malolos is headed by the Mayor of Malolos alongside the vice mayor and the members of the Sangguniang Panlungsod, a 10-member city council whom are all elected once every three years. This is in pursuant of Article 6, Section 8 of the 1987 Philippine Constitution. The mayor and his/her fellow leaders is limited to three-consecutive, three-year terms and is prohibited to seek for re-election a fourth time. However, in certain circumstances, leaders would run for another set of three-consecutive terms after a term-interruption.

The city is led by Mayor Christian D. Natividad, often referred to his nickname "Agila". Natividad previously served as the local chief executive from 2010 to 2019 before unsuccessfully running for Governor of Bulacan during the 2019 Philippine general elections. Natividad lost to incumbent governor Daniel Fernando who previously served as vice-governor for three terms. In 2022, he ran for Mayor for his fourth term as a whole, but his first term non-consecutively, defeating former tandem and running-mate Bebong Gatchalian. The vice mayor is Miguel Alberto Bautista. Bautista was a third-party contender among the running mates of the mayoral candidates in the 2022 Philippine general elections.

Danny A. Domingo is the incumbent member of the House of Representatives whom represents Malolos as part of the first district in the 19th Congress of the Philippines. Domingo was the former mayor of the city of Malolos from 2001 to 2010 before beating then-incumbent Jose Antonio Sy-Alvarado in 2022.

New Malolos City Hall

Office	Officeholder	Term-in-office	Party
Mayor of Malolos	Atty. Christian "Agila" D. Natividad	30 June 2022 – present	NUP
Vice Mayor of Malolos	Gilbert T. Gatchalian	30 June 2025 – present	Independent
House of Representative Member	Danny "DAD" A. Domingo	30 June 2022 – present	NUP
City Council Members (10)
John Vincent G. Vitug III		30 June 2025 – present	NUP
Dennis D. San Diego		30 June 2025 – present	NUP
Meri Ann Geli Bulaong		30 June 2025 – present	NUP
Edgardo F. Domingo		30 June 2025 – present	Independent
Victorino M. Aldaba III		30 June 2025 – present	NUP
Luis Alfonso M. Arcega		30 June 2025 – present	NUP
Miel Arthem B. Agustin		30 June 2025 – present	NUP
Miguel Carlos B. Soto		30 June 2025 – present	Independent
Noel G. Pineda		30 June 2025 – present	NUP
Christian Peter C. Bautista		30 June 2025 – present	Independent

== Culture ==
=== Heritage and tourism ===
Malolos Historic Town Center
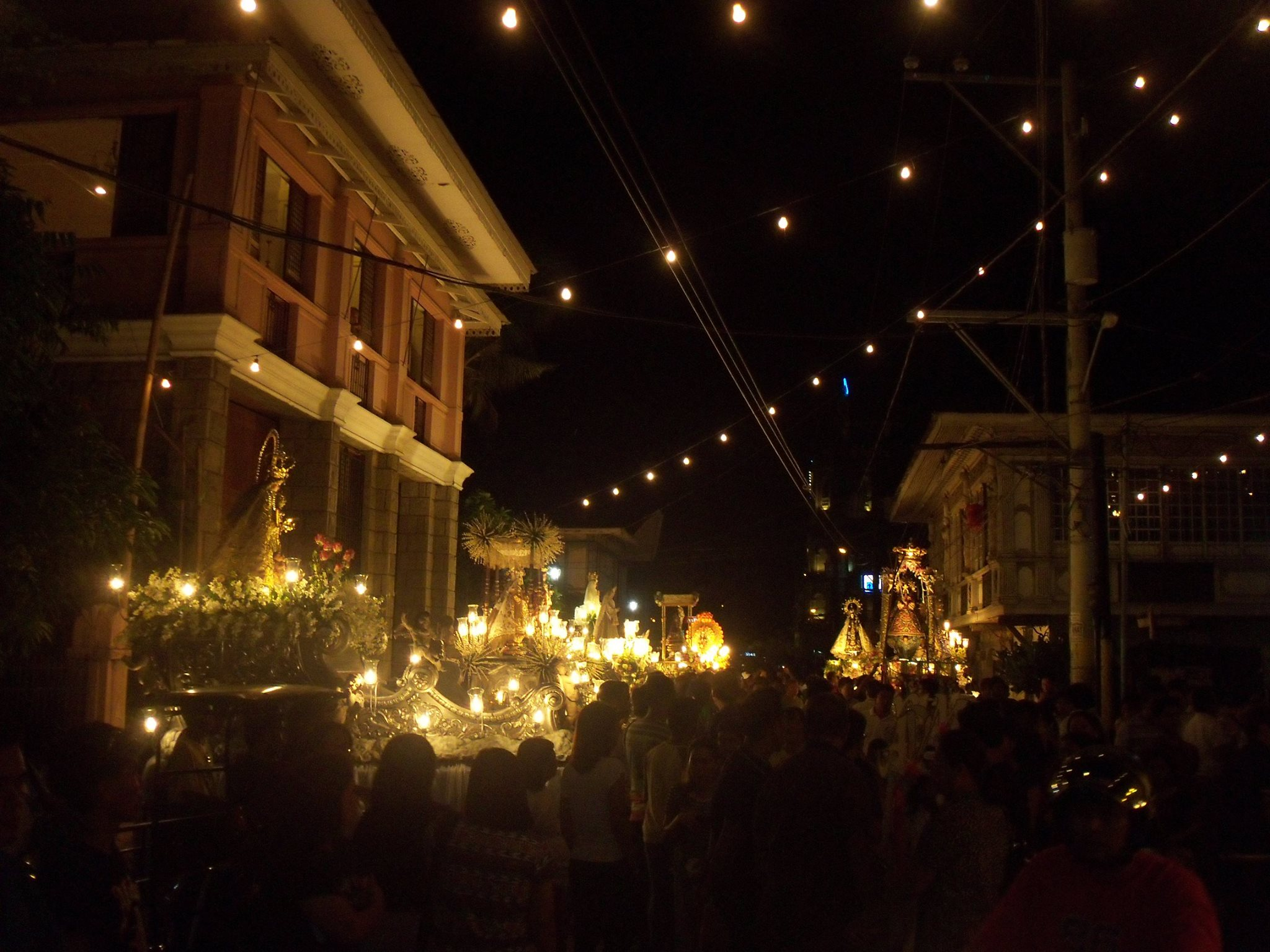
- The Historic Town Center of Malolos was declared as one of the Philippine Heritage Sites in August 2001.
- Interactive map of Malolos Historic Town Center
- Location: City of Malolos, Bulacan, Philippines 3000

Site notes
- Governing body: National Historical Commission of the Philippines

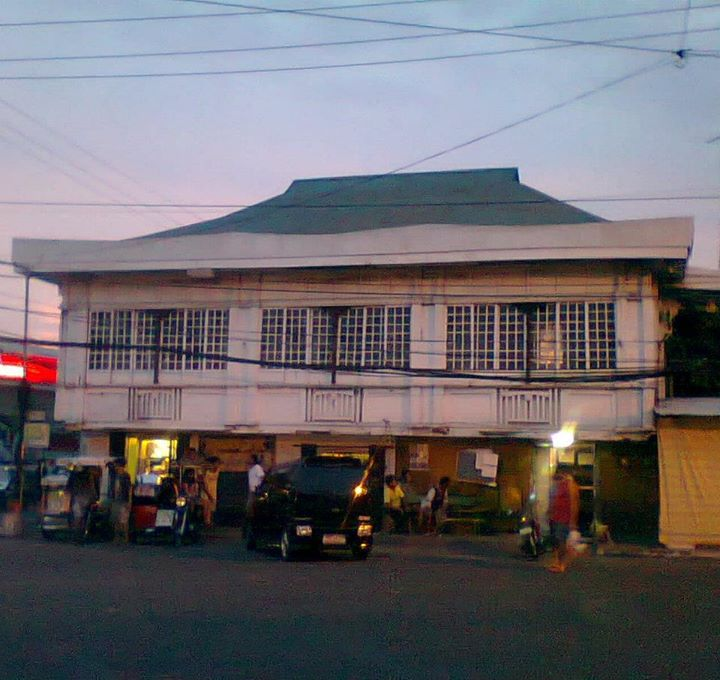
Don Antonio Bautista's mansion

Malolos is hailed as the Premiere Heritage City of Bulacan. Many ancestral houses from the Spanish and American periods, Spanish colonial churches and chapels, historical sites and landmarks, and even structures such as walls and bridges with heritage and historical value are found around the city. Some of these were already marked by National Historical Institute while others are marked by the City Government. The historic town center of Malolos was declared National Heritage Landmark on August 15, 2001, under the name of Malolos Heritage Town.

The Barasoain Church, erected in 1885, was the site of the very First Philippine Congress on September 15, 1898, and the inauguration of the First Philippine Republic on January 23, 1899. In this church the Oath of Office of Emilio Aguinaldo and Joseph Estrada as Philippine presidents took place. Within the premises of Barasoain Church, there are other historical markers installed by National Historical Commission, such as the Universidad Literaria y Scienifico de Filipina at Malolos Convent, General Emilio Aguinaldo Monument at Barasoain patio, and First Philippine Republic marker installed at the left side of the main lateral wall of the church.

The Malolos Cathedral, originally a visita of Tondo in 1572 and became town parish on June 11, 1580, serves the seat of the Roman Catholic Diocese of Malolos from 1962. It served as Presidential Palace during First Republic. It was marked by National Historical Institute in 1956.

Casa Real de Malolos, originally built in 1580, served as Casa Tribunal and Casa Presidencia of the town gobernadorcillo. It became the Spanish treasury in 1673. Declared National Shrine on October 4, 1965. Now it is the Museum of Philippine Political History

Gobierno Militar dela Plaza, ancestral house of Doña Gregoria Vasquez Adriano, became headquarters of Gobierno Militar de la Plaza during 1898–1899, marked and declared heritage site in 1998

Other historical heritage landmarks marked by the National Historical Institute are:

- Jose Cojuanco Shrine, the ancestral house of Cojuangcos, was marked and declared heritage site in 2009
- Paaralan ng mg Kababaihan ng malolos, ruins of the actual site of the school of the women of Malolos established in 1889.
- Pook na Sinilangan ni Isidoro Matanglawin-Torres, actual site of the birthplace of General Isidoro Torres at Barrio Matimbo, a Katipunan General, marked by National Historical Institute.

(Pook na Sinilangan ni Guillermo Tolentino, ancestral house of National Artist Guillermo Tolentino, marked by National Historical Commission of the Philippines in 2012.

- Alberta Uitangcoy-Santos House, house of Doña Alberta Uitangcoy-Santos, leader of the famed 20 Women of Malolos. Declared a National Heritage House in 2012 and currently houses the Museum of the Women of Malolos, curated by Carlo Herrera.

Other sites that possess heritage and historical value but are not currently marked by the National Historical Institute:

- Casa Tribunal de Malolos, 2nd town hall of Malolos at Calle Pariancillo.
- Bulacan Capitol Building, built in 1930 in Art Deco style, designed by Juan Arellano.
- Malolos Municipal Building, built in 1940 in Neo-Classical style at the bank of Liyang River opposite to the cathedral.
- Santa Isabel de Hungria Church and Convent, another Malolos Colonial Church built in 1859.
- Don Ramon Gonzales de Leon House, Gobernadorcillo, built in 1923.
- Don Antonio Bautista House, Aguinaldo Ayunda de Campo, built in 1820 and renovated by Isabelo Tampinco it is the original house of Doña Rufina Tanjosoy.
- Don Jose Bautista, built in 1877 in Art Nouveau manner, ancestral house of Don Jose Bautista, husband of Doña Rufina Tanjosoy.
- Dr. Luis Santos House, art deco house built in 1933 house of Malolos renowned eye doctor. Dr. Luis is a son of Doña Alberta Uitangcoy.
- Hermogenes Reyes House, built in 1904.
- Don Santiago Cruz House at Pariancillo, Barrio Santiago, ancestral house of then Gobernadorcillo Santiago.
- Mariano Crisostomo House I, house of Liberal Gobernadorcillo Don Mariano Crisostomo Calle M. Tengco
- Mariano Crisostomo House II, another house of Mariano Crisostomo located at Calle Estrella, barrio Santo Rosario
- Aguas Potables de Malolos, American Period water cistern built in 1923 by Mayor Mariano Santos-Tengco.
- Tomas Tanchangco House II, another ancestral house of Gobernadorcillo Don Tomas Tanchangco at Calle Tenjeco, Sa Vicente.
- Santo Rosario Chapel, barrio chapel built in 1870 used as temporary town Church when the revolutionaries burned the main town church in 1899.
- Iglesia Filipina Independiente, built in 1903 Bulacan Cathedral of Iglesia Filipina Independietne, also known as Aglipay.
- Atlag Methodist Church, one of the first Methodist Churches in the Philippines also built in 1903.
- Bulacan High School, 1905 ruins of the first secondary high school built by Thomasites in Malolos.
- 1913 Gabaldon Building of Malolos Central School
- 1919 Logia Malolos No. 46 was constituted and later in 1921, Templo Plaridel which housed Logia Malolos No. 46 was erected in Sto. Rosario. Its first venerable master was Nicolas Buendia, who later became its mayor, then Governor of Bulacan, then Senator of the Commonwealth under Pres. Manuel L. Quezon.

=== Feasts and festivals ===
Dubbed as the Bulacan's City of Festivals, Malolos boasts with many feasts and festivals every year. Some festivals are civic festivities and most are religious festivals.

- Singkaban Festival (Sining at Kalinangan ng Bulacan), a festival of arts and culture in honor of Capitol's patron saint, "Our Lady of Victory", showcasing the traditional arts of "Balagtasan", "Kundiman" and folk dances amidst of the "Singkaban" arches. The festival is celebrated in every second week of September which is in conjunction with the "Linggo ng Bulacan" (Held during September 8–15), A province-wide, week-long celebration consisting of various colourful cultural presentations, art and culinary exhibits, arts and skills contests, and the prestigious annual Dangal ng Lipi Awards Night and concluding with the anniversary of the opening of the Malolos Congress. Yearly, its activities vary depending upon the chosen theme for the year. This festival is named after the special "BAMBOO ART", the skillfully carved bamboo arches, abundantly known to the Bulacan province especially in Malolos and Hagonoy where Singkaban Art originated. The 19th Singkaban Festival's theme is "Pagyakap sa Kasaysayan, Pagsulong sa Kinabukasan."
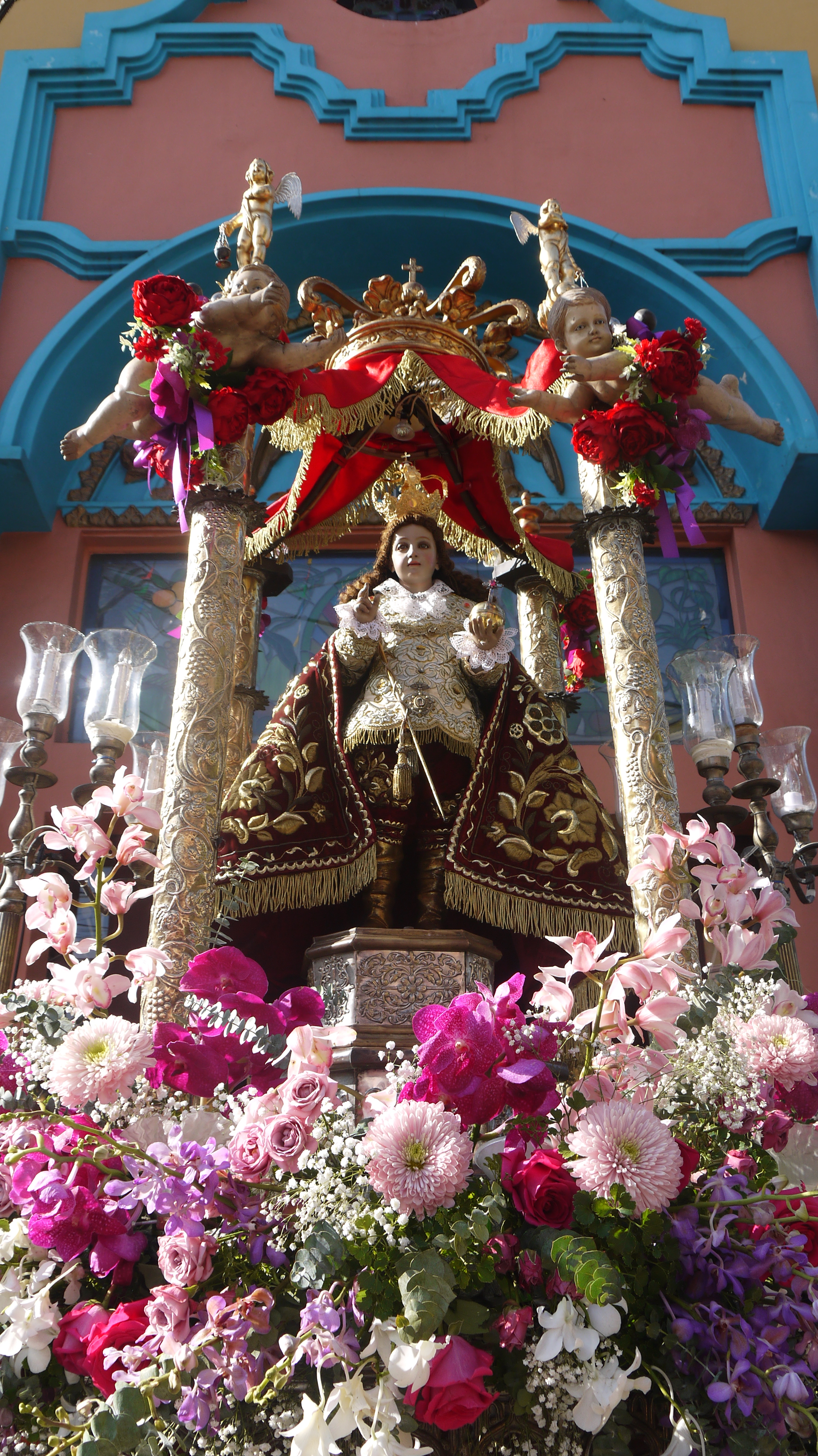
  Image of the Santo Niño de Malolos during the Santo Niño de Malolos Festival in 2024.

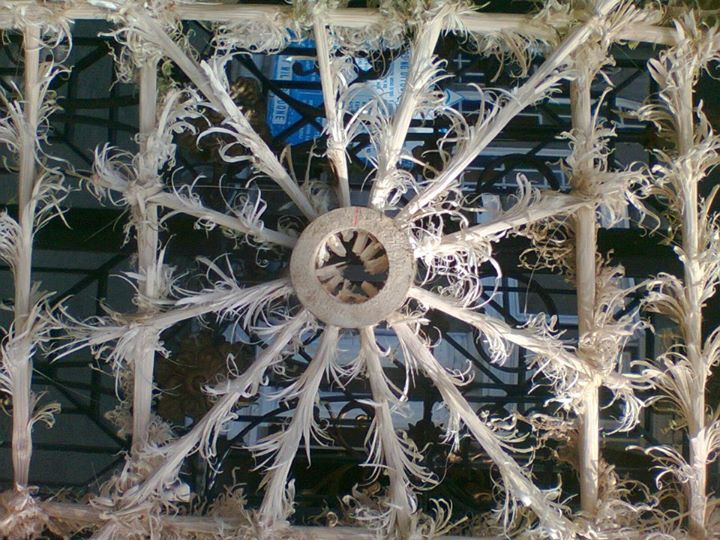
Malolos version of Singkaban made in Pulo, Barihan

- Santo Niño de Malolos Festival – This is held during the last Sunday of January, The biggest and largest expression of devotion to the Holy Child Jesus in the Luzon island, celebrated every last Sunday of January. The festivities begin with an exhibit of "Santo Niño" (Holy Child) and culminate in a grand procession of hundreds of folk, antique and new statues of the Holy Child in different depictions. The highlight of this festival is the hundred-year-old antique miraculous image of Senor Sto Nino de Malolos.
- Pista ng Santisima Trinidad na Matanda - held annually on Trinity Sunday, it is commonly called Pista ng Santisima Trinidad and other called it "Pista ng Barihan" because Barangays of Barihan, Santisima Trinidad and Pinagbakahan were having one fiesta and one common church in a reason still unknown to the elderly since Spanish period. This fiesta started since the 18th century, where thousands of people from different towns and provinces attending this fiesta and flocks into the Old Chapel to pray for petition and wishes. It is not only at Fiesta but every Fridays and Sundays of the year. It is also dub by the Diocese of Malolos as "Quiapo ng Bulacan". The Fiesta highlights is the public exposition of the miraculous and highly venerated antique icons of the Holy Trinity, during procession attended by other holy images from all parts of the province.

The four holy processional icons are:

- Santisima Trinidad de Mayor - oil on canvas, the back of the canvass exposed a date of January 10, 1500, and is thus the oldest Catholic icon in the Philippines. It is considered very miraculous by majority faithful.
- Santisima Trinidad na Bata - oil on rosewood, a 1762 icon is the second-oldest among the processional icons.
- Santisima Trinidad de Trisagio - the last and youngest of the three holy icons depicting the "biblical trinity"
- The fourth venerated icon, the Santisima Trinidad de Original, it was the nucleus of the chapel, the site was farmland. This icon was enshrined in the Santisima Trinidad Chapel's main retablo. Sadly it was stolen on October 27, 1981, after Pistang Maliit and remains lost.

All of these antique and miraculous images are in the custody of the Bisitang Matanda ng Santisima Trinidad and can be visited and seen at the houses of the designated annual Hermano.

- Pabukang Puso — held every March 19 in Panasahan, commemorates the death of Saint Joseph the Worker, Foster-father of Jesus. It is annually held at the front house of Roxas clan in Panasahan, whose patriarch, Valentin Roxas, started it in 1975. This tradition still continues until present day where the younger generations of the clan organising it.
- Pag-akyat Festival — one of the traditionally-preserved feasts in the city, held in Barangay Atlag. It culminates the Ascension of Our Lord.
- Fiesta Republica (A Festival of the Philippine History) - held during every third week of January and celebration of the First Philippine Republic, held since 2011, jointly held with the Santo Niño de Malolos fiesta

=== Parks and museums ===
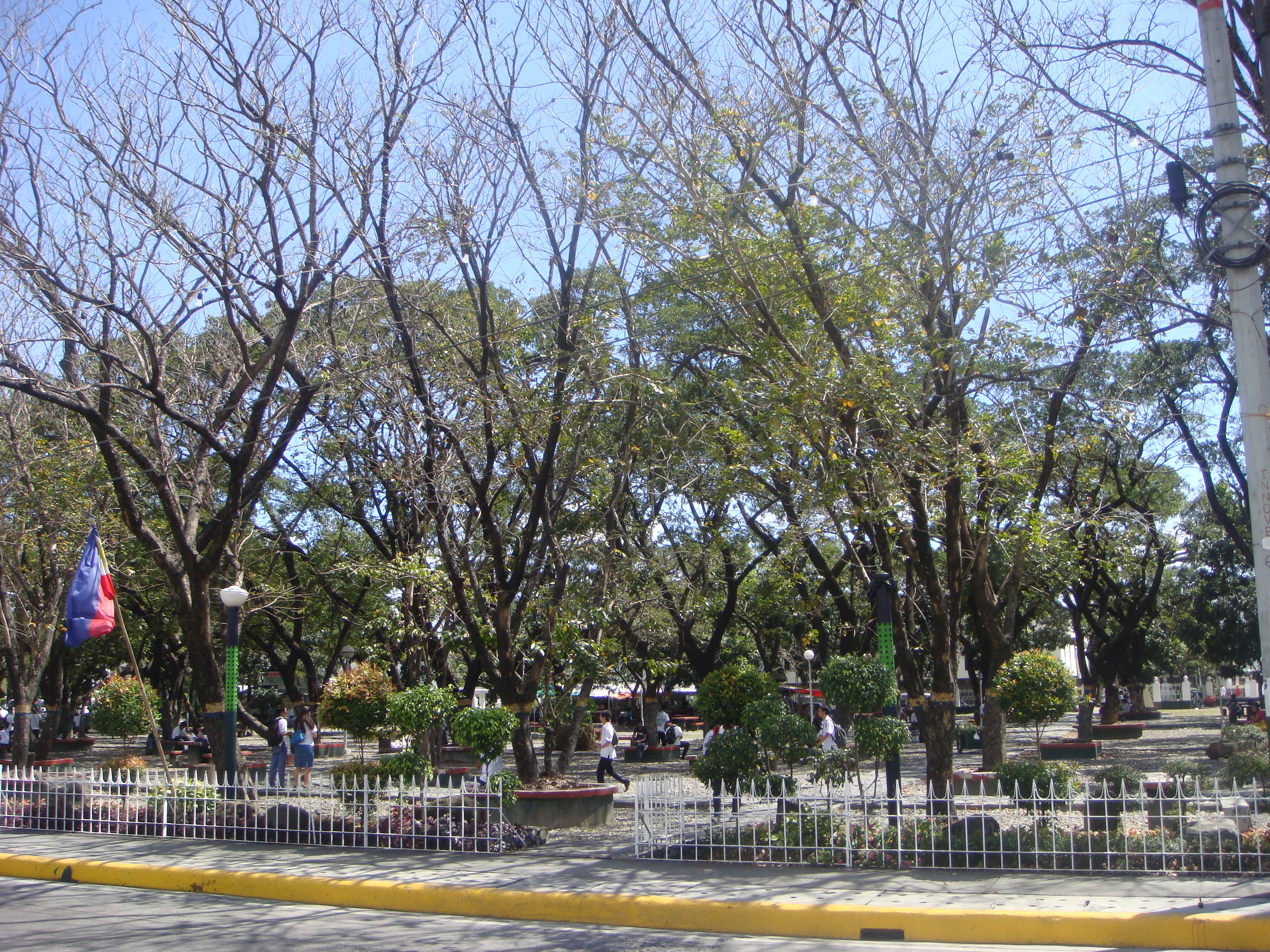
Capitol Mini-Forest and Children's Park.

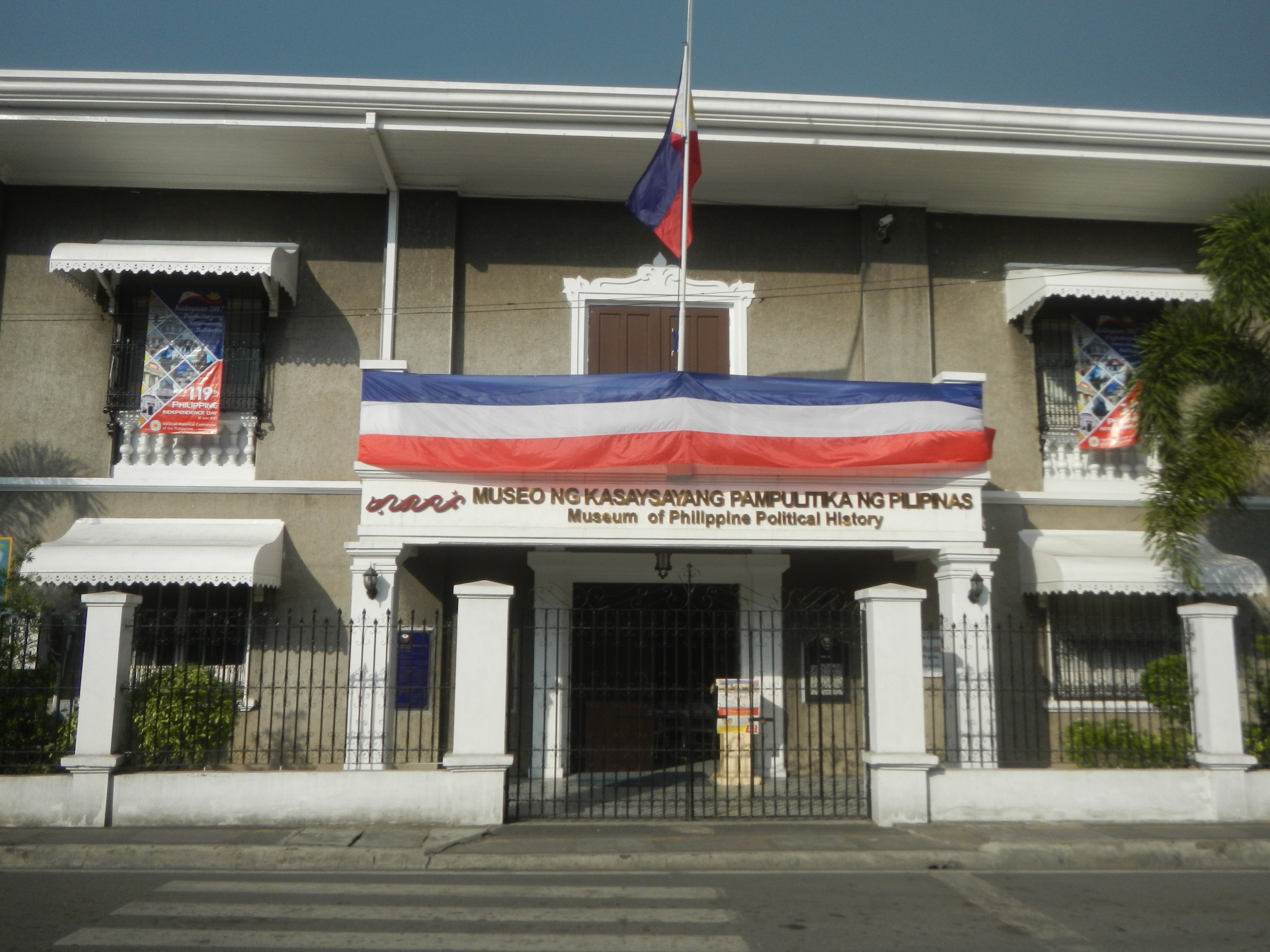
The Museum of Philippine Political History

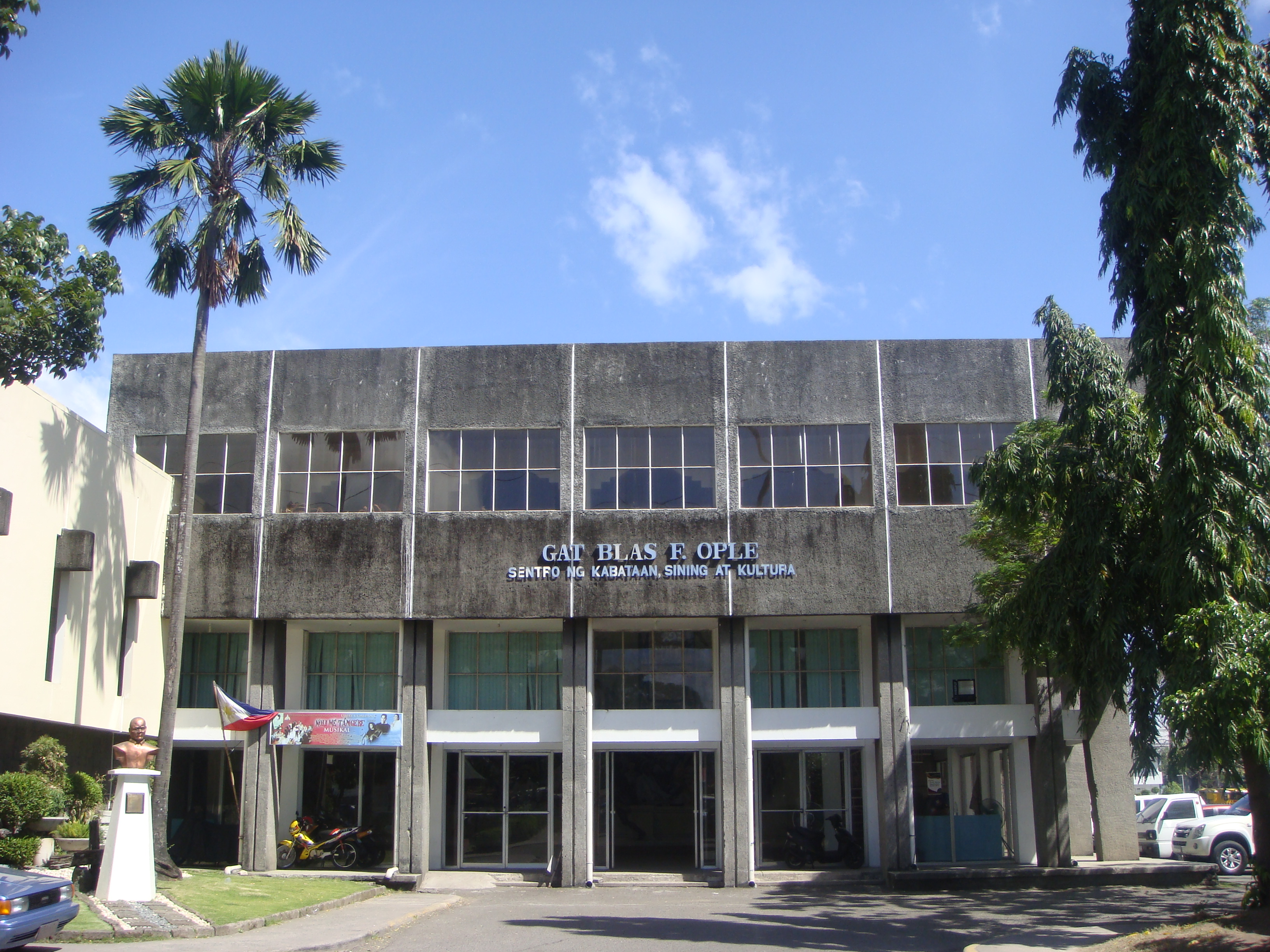
Gat Blas F. Ople Sentro ng Kabataan, Sining at Kultura ng Bulacan.

- Hardin ng mga Bayani at Sining also known as Capitol Mini-Forest and Children's Park, in Provincial Capitol Compound
- Bulacan Heroes Park in Bulacan State University
- Mini Rizal Park in Bulacan State University
- Museo ng Bulacan, Hiyas ng Bulacan Museum Complex, located 500 m from Barasoain Church, is a cultural center and museum that houses the works, artifacts, relics and manuscripts of Francisco Balagtas, Marcelo H. del Pilar, Gregorio del Pilar, Mariano Ponce and other famous men of Bulacan.
- Casa Real Shrine, now Museum of Philippine Political History
- Barasoain Museum, located across the hall of the Barasoain Convent, is managed by the National Historical Institute. Its corridors are hung with historical photographs of Bulacan and different rooms relate how democracy was established in the country. Open daily, 8 am – 5 pm. Admission is free. The church and convent were declared as a National Landmark on August 1, 1973, under Presidential Decree No. 260 and both underwent a thorough restoration under the supervision of the National Historical Commission.
- Museo Diocesano de Malolos, an ecclesiastical art museum housed also at the Barasoain Convent, is managed by the Diocese of Malolos. It houses relics and religious items such as original 19th century baptismal records of Marcelo Hilario (a.k.a. Marcelo H. del Pilar), Francisco Baltazar (a.k.a. Francisco Balagtas) and Gregorio del Pilar; a bone fragment of San Vicente Ferrer encased in glass; priestly robes embroidered with gold-plated silver threads, antique prayer cards and altar frontals from different churches.
- Museum of the Women of Malolos, found in the Uitangcoy-Santos House, this museum has four exhibit halls and a lecture hall of collections relative to the women's historical narrative. It is curated by the fifth-generation grandson of Alberta Uitangcoy-Santos, Carlo Herrera.
- Pamarawan bird sanctuary, located near and part of the New Manila International Airport, the 40-hectare (99-acre) "Saribuhay sa Dampalit" is the Philippines’ first and largest Biodiversity Offset Program as noted by Toni Yulo-Loyzaga. It adheres to the International Finance Corporation environment and social standards. San Miguel Aerocity Inc. is an awardee of Asia-Pacific's 25 Steward Leadership Excellence for its bird sanctuary. The site serves as stopover for wader bird migration along East Asian–Australasian Flyway and a nayural flood protection.

=== Shopping ===
Robinsons Place Malolos is the 35th mall in Robinsons Malls' nationwide chain and its second in Bulacan. This four-storey shopping center with a multi-level parking area, has a department store, a supermarket and a cinema of its own. This mall also offers a wide selection of restaurants and fast-food outlets, fashion boutiques, tech and service stores as well as health and beauty clinics.

=== Sports ===
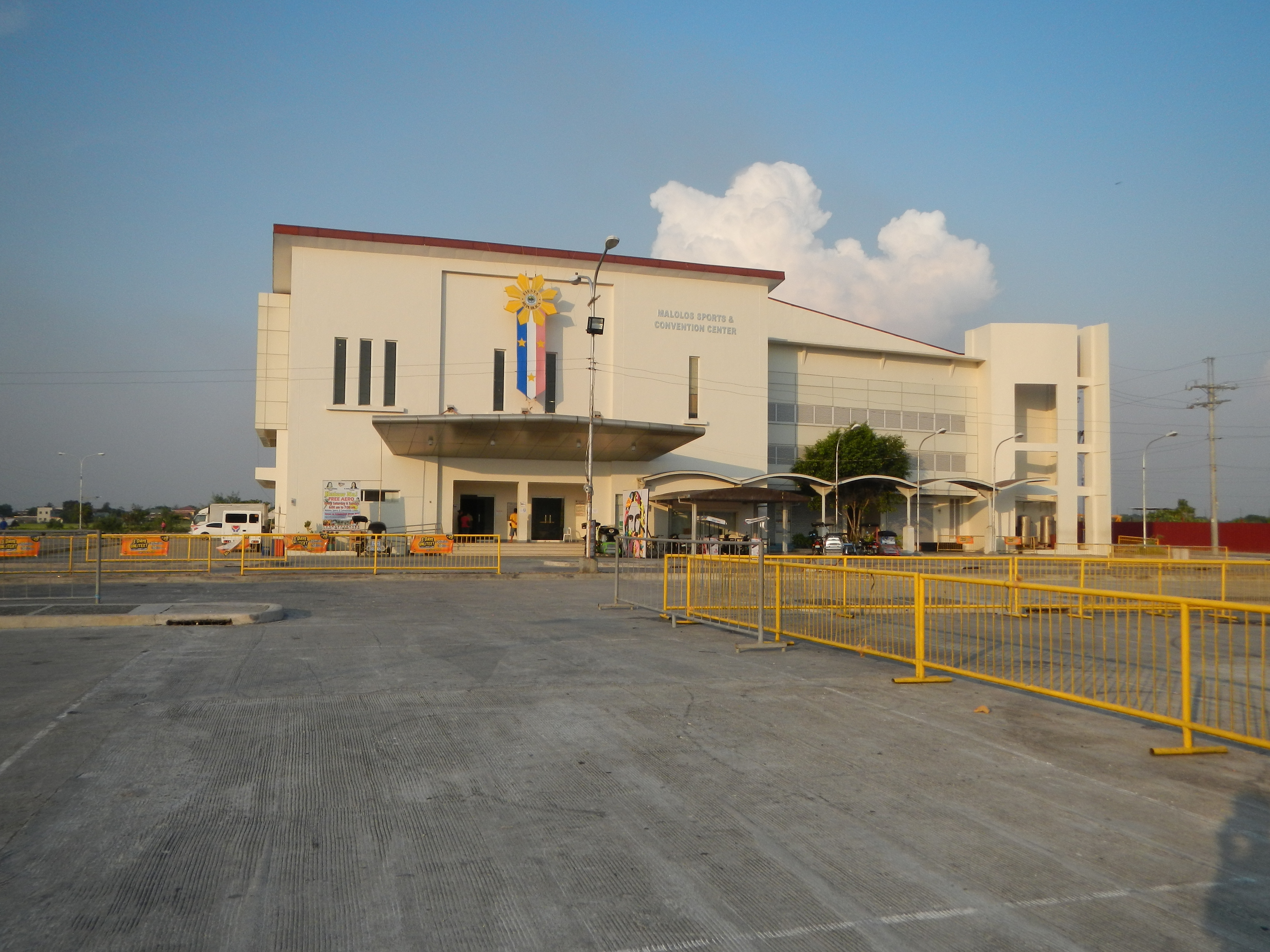
Malolos Sports & Convention Center

Malolos has sports venues, such as the Bulacan Sports Complex and Malolos Sports and Convention Center. The Bulacan Sports Complex houses a track field, a football field, basketball courts, an oval, and a lap pool. Both the Bulacan Sports Complex and Malolos Sports & Convention Center had hosted several regional, provincial, and city sports events, such as the 2017 Central Luzon Regional Athletic Association, and the Republica Cup, an invitational sports tournament held annually.

== Education ==
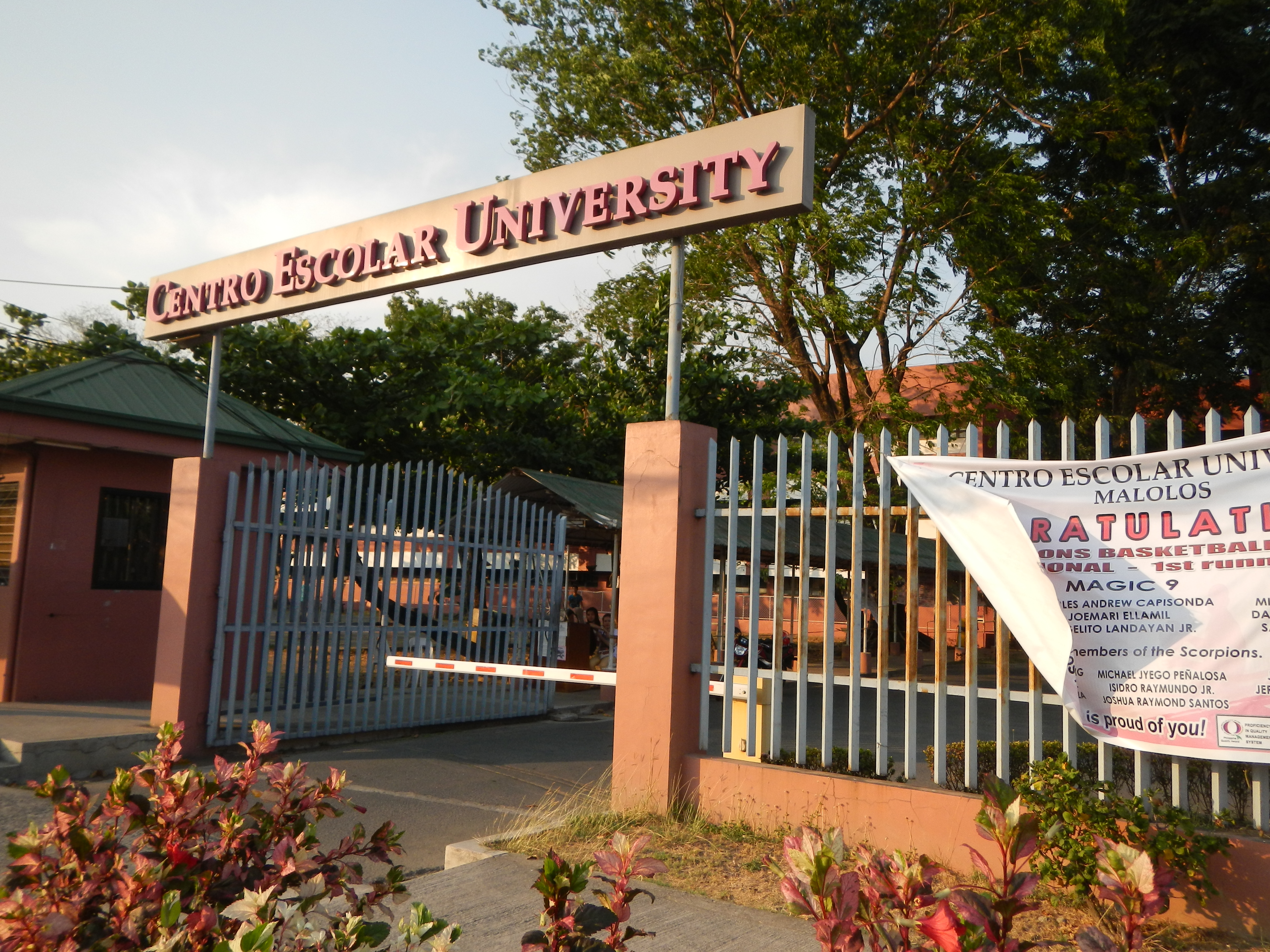
Centro Escolar University Malolos Campus

Malolos is hailed as one of the centers of education in Central Luzon region. It has several universities such as the government-funded Bulacan State University, and privately owned STI College Academic Center, Centro Escolar University at Malolos and La Consolacion University Philippines. There are private tertiary schools. It also houses the most populous high school in Central Luzon, Marcelo H. del Pilar National High School, founded in 1905.

The city has 9 public high schools and 45 public elementary schools under the authority of Department of Education Division of City Schools of Malolos. The city schools are divided into two educational districts for representational purposes. There are also privately owned and church-operated schools established in the city. These private schools are members of Malolos City Private schools Association (MACIPRISA). Technical schools and computer colleges can also be found in the city.

== Social services ==
=== Housing ===
The Malolos hosts more than 51 residential subdivisions and the Northville 8 Resettlement Project of the Philippine government.

=== Health ===
The City Health Office of Malolos is responsible for the planning and implementation of the health care programs provided by the city government. It currently operates seven health centers. The Bulacan Medical Center (formerly Bulacan Provincial Hospital), operated by the provincial government of Bulacan, is also located in the city.

Private hospitals can also be found in the city. Some of the private hospitals that operate in the city are Sacred Heart Hospital, Santos General Hospital, Malolos Maternity Hospital, Malolos San Ildefonso County Hospital, Ofelia Mendoza Maternity and General Hospital, and the Graman Medical and Maternity Hospital.

== Sister cities ==
- (Philippines) Bayambang, Pangasinan
- Hagåtña, Guam

== Notable people ==
- Nikko Natividad - dancer, actor, member of Hastags
- Aria Clemente - singer and actress
- Sanya Lopez - actress
- Luz Ocampo - pabalat artisan

Preceded by Bacoor	Capital of the Philippines; 1898–1899	Succeeded by San Isidro, Nueva Ecija
Preceded by Bulakan	Capital of Bulacan; 1901–present	Incumbent
