= 2023 San Jose del Monte conversion plebiscite =

Philippines local election

- October 30, 2023
- Do you agree to the City of San Jose del Monte, Province of Bulacan becoming a 'Highly-Urbanized City' pursuant to Proclamation No. 1057 which became law on December 4, 2020?
- Outcome: Proposal rejected

Results
Choice	Votes	%
Yes	620,707	43.07%
No	820,385	56.93%
Valid votes	1,441,092	89.62%
Invalid or blank votes	166,912	10.38%
Total votes	1,608,004	100.00%
Registered voters/turnout	2,092,248	76.86%

A plebiscite was held in the province of Bulacan, Philippines, on October 30, 2023, to determine whether San Jose del Monte should be converted into a highly urbanized city. Had the measure been approved, San Jose del Monte would have become politically, fiscally, and administratively independent of Bulacan; if rejected, the city would remain a component city of the province.

The city government supported the proposal, while the provincial government neither supported nor opposed it. The measure was ultimately rejected, with a narrow majority of voters in San Jose del Monte itself voting against the conversion.

The plebiscite was held concurrently with the 2023 Philippine barangay and Sangguniang Kabataan elections, meaning voters in Bulacan could receive up to three ballots.

== Background ==
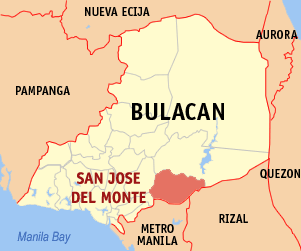
Map showing the location of San Jose del Monte in Bulacan

San Jose del Monte became a component city of the province of Bulacan on September 10, 2000 through Republic Act No. 8797 which was authored by Angelito Sarmiento, the representative of its 4th congressional district at the time. The city later represented itself as a lone congressional district on December 18, 2003.

On December 6, 2020, Philippine President Rodrigo Duterte signed Proclamation No. 1057, proclaiming San Jose del Monte as a highly-urbanized city. The proclamation came after the city's Sangguniang Panglungsod passed Resolution No. 2019-059-09, requesting the President to proclaim the city as such due to meeting the requirements of having "a minimum population of 200,000 as certified by the Philippine Statistics Authority and an income of at least P50 million as certified by the City Treasurer". The proclamation would take effect after ratification in a plebiscite.

== Preparations ==
=== Scheduling ===
The plebiscite was supposed to be held four months after the 2022 national and local elections, but it was overdue. On September 11, 2023, the COMELEC scheduled the plebiscite on October 30, synchronizing with the barangay and Sangguniang Kabataan elections.

=== Questions ===
The ballot question is as follows:

In Filipino:

Pumapayag ka ba na ang Lungsod ng San Jose del Monte, Lalawigan ng Bulacan ay gawing isang 'Highly-Urbanized City' alinsunod sa Proclamation No. 1057 na naging ganap na batas noong Disyembre 4, 2020?

English translation:

Do you agree to the City of San Jose del Monte, Province of Bulacan becoming a 'Highly-Urbanized City' pursuant to Proclamation No. 1057 which became law on December 4, 2020?

Voters were opted to write "yes" or "oo" if they agree, or "no" or "hindi" if they oppose the proposal.

== Campaign ==
The San Jose del Monte government kickstarted its 'Yes' campaign on September 9, 2023 with the Tanglawan Festival. According to Representative Rida Robes, the city "desperately needs" its highly-urbanized city status, and if it stayed being a component city, it would have a small source of funds for service to its people. The League of Municipalities of the Philippines' Bulacan chapter pledged its support through a manifesto. All six members of the House of Representatives from Bulacan supported the proposal. The National Movement of Young Legislators Bulacan Chapter was also for the proposal. The Iglesia ni Cristo backed the proposal, as well.

However, the city's 2nd district councilor Romeo Agapito said that the city was not yet ready for the status, citing higher taxes, unemployment and aid from the provincial capitol becoming limited if it did become a highly urbanized city. The provincial chapter of the Liga ng mga Barangay was against the proposal. Two previous governors of Bulacan, Wilhelmino Sy-Alvarado and Roberto Pagdanganan, opposed the conversion. The current governor, Daniel Fernando, remarked that "no father is happy when he sees his child leave," but left the choice to the people.

== Results ==
The majority of voters rejected the conversion, as declared by COMELEC two days after the plebiscite, while a tenth of those who participated in the conduct did not vote, leaving blank ballots.

COMELEC explained that the involvement of the entire Bulacan in the plebiscite is due to a Supreme Court ruling on a similar case in Nueva Ecija, G.R. No. 203974: Umali v. COMELEC. (Note: In 2014, the court ordered the conduct of the same plebiscite for Cabanatuan across its mother province, but it was eventually cancelled.) Unlike before, when only the city itself could participate in such cases, the decision indicated that all residents affected by the change of constituency in such an entity should be consulted.

Do you agree to the City of San Jose del Monte, Province of Bulacan becoming a 'Highly-Urbanized City'?
Choice	Votes	%
For	620,707	43.07
Against	820,385	56.93
Total	1,441,092	100.00
Valid votes	1,441,092	89.62
Invalid/blank votes	166,912	10.38
Total votes	1,608,004	100.00
Registered voters/turnout	2,092,248	76.86

=== Per city/municipality ===
Results per city/municipality
City/municipality	Yes / Oo		No / Hindi		Valid votes		Invalid votes		Turnout		Registered voters
City/municipality	Total	%	Total	%	Total	%	Total	%	Total	%	Registered voters
Angat	10,359	32.81	21,211	67.19	31,570	89.37	3,756	10.63	35,326	80.72	43,762
Balagtas	13,010	35.85	23,280	64.15	36,290	89.66	4,187	10.34	40,477	71.01	57,001
Baliwag	35,489	45.23	42,969	54.77	78,548	90.18	8,547	9.82	87,005	78.13	111,356
Bocaue	26,423	48.93	27,575	51.07	53,998	90.63	5,580	9.37	59,578	74.31	80,171
Bulakan	11,848	32.06	25,113	67.94	36,961	88.34	4,880	11.66	41,841	75.66	55,304
Bustos	16,504	47.22	18,449	52.78	34,953	88.89	4,367	11.11	39,320	77.99	50,416
Calumpit	18,464	35.86	33,025	64.14	51,489	89.36	6,132	10.64	57,621	79.49	72,489
Doña Remedios Trinidad	6,053	36.93	10,337	63.07	16,390	84.13	3,091	15.87	19,841	75.99	25,636
Guiguinto	21,050	42.03	29,029	57.97	50,079	88.59	6,452	11.41	56,531	73.53	76,884
Hagonoy	16,421	29.22	39,773	70.78	56,194	88.23	7,497	11.77	63,691	74.95	84,983
Malolos	33,633	36.82	57,712	63.18	91,345	92.27	8,195	8.28	99,000	75.70	130,785
Marilao	41,631	55.35	33,579	44.65	75,210	91.41	7,069	8.59	82,279	74.87	109,899
Meycauayan	61,214	69.75	26,554	30.25	87,768	89.83	9,924	10.16	97,702	73.94	132,144
Norzagaray	13,904	24.48	42,892	75.52	56,796	92.10	4,782	7.75	61,668	76.87	80,228
Obando	10,420	46.09	12,190	53.91	22,610	88.20	3,026	11.80	25,636	70.81	36,202
Pandi	31,530	47.98	34,188	52.02	65,718	88.38	8,641	11.62	74,359	79.71	93,282
Paombong	8,645	32.08	18,304	67.92	26,949	88.42	3,528	11.58	30,477	78.44	38,856
Plaridel	17,739	38.23	28,658	61.77	46,397	87.79	6,450	12.21	52,847	73.82	71,585
Pulilan	17,944	38.86	28,231	61.14	46,175	86.59	7,151	13.41	53,326	78.45	67,978
San Ildefonso	24,372	41.44	34,447	58.56	58,519	87.01	8,781	12.99	67,600	85.28	79,267
San Jose del Monte	92,714	48.68	97,754	51.32	190,468	95.31	9,381	4.69	199,849	72.08	277,274
San Miguel	31,853	43.27	41,769	56.73	73,622	79.85	18,577	20.15	92,199	88.61	104,056
San Rafael	16,394	33.97	31,861	66.03	48,255	87.52	6,878	12.48	55,133	81.94	67,286
Santa Maria	43,093	41.29	61,285	58.71	104,378	90.72	10,680	9.28	115,058	76.56	150,289
Bulacan	620,707	43.07	820,385	56.93	1,441,092	89.62	166,912	10.38	1,608,004	76.86	2,092,048

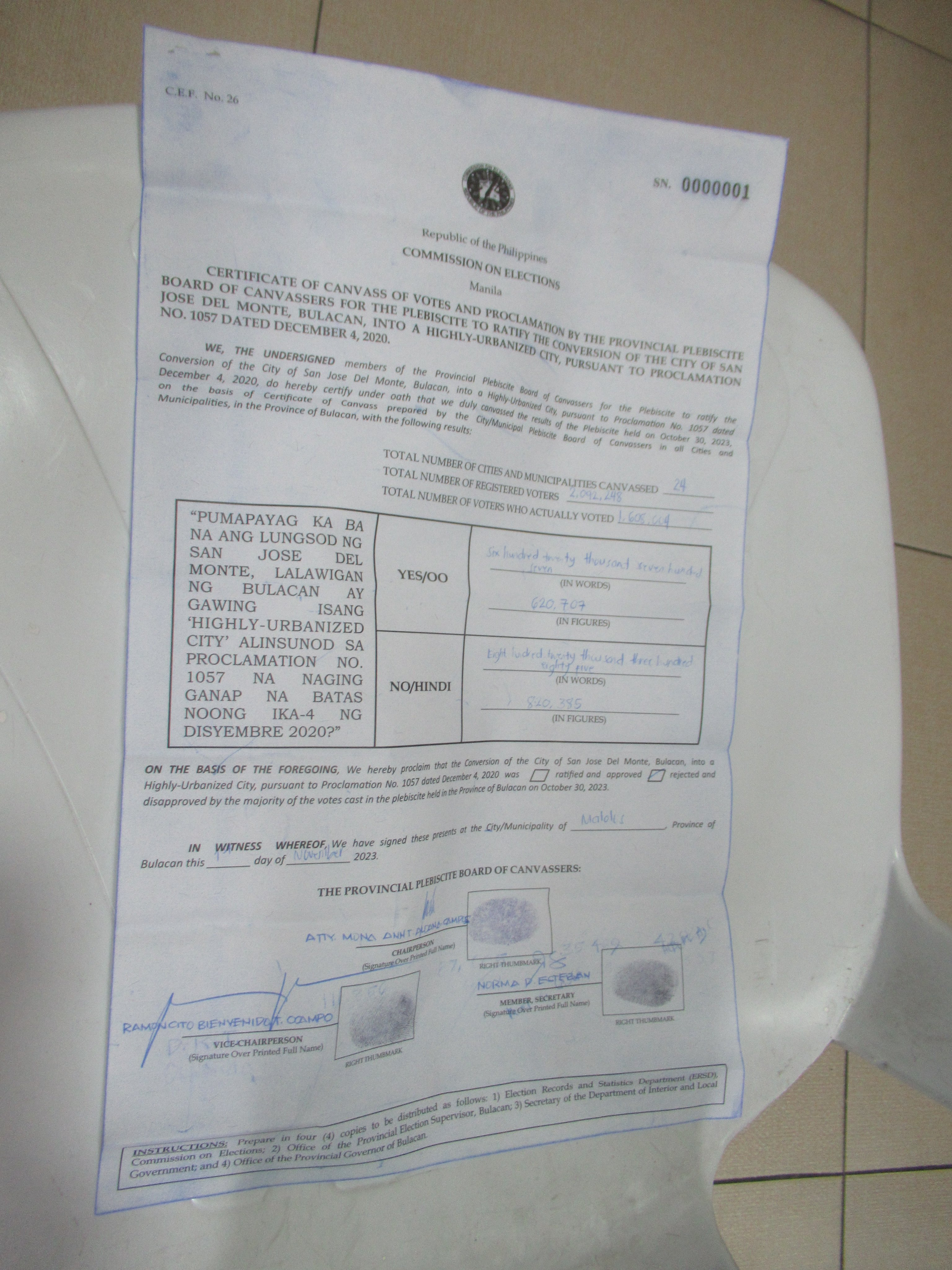
Certificate of Canvass of Votes and Proclamation

=== Per legislative district ===
For purposes of representation in the House of Representatives of the Philippines, Bulacan is divided into seven congressional districts, the 1st to 6th congressional districts of Bulacan, and San Jose del Monte's district.

For purposes of representation in the Bulacan Provincial Board, it is identical to congressional districts, except that San Jose del Monte is not treated separately but is instead included in the 4th provincial board district.

Results per congressional district
District	Yes		No		Valid votes
District	Total	%	Total	%	Valid votes
Bulacan's 1st district	106,955	34.60	202,158	65.40	309,113
Bulacan's 2nd district	69,732	43.63	90,076	56.37	159,808
Bulacan's 3rd district	78,672	39.92	118,414	60.08	197,086
Bulacan's 4th district	113,265	61.03	72,323	38.97	185,588
Bulacan's 5th district	92,013	44.65	114,072	55.35	206,085
Bulacan's 6th district	67,356	34.95	125,388	65.05	192,744
San Jose del Monte's lone district	92,714	48.68	97,754	51.32	190,468
Bulacan	620,707	43.07	820,385	56.93	1,441,092

Results per provincial board district
District	Yes		No		Valid votes
District	Total	%	Total	%	Valid votes
1st district	106,955	34.60	202,158	65.40	309,113
2nd district	69,732	43.63	90,076	56.37	159,808
3rd district	78,672	39.92	118,414	60.08	197,086
4th district	205,979	54.77	170,077	45.23	376,056
5th district	92,013	44.65	114,072	55.35	206,085
6th district	67,356	34.95	125,388	65.05	192,744
Bulacan	620,707	43.07	820,385	56.93	1,441,092
