= Christina Frasco =

Filipino politician (born 1981)

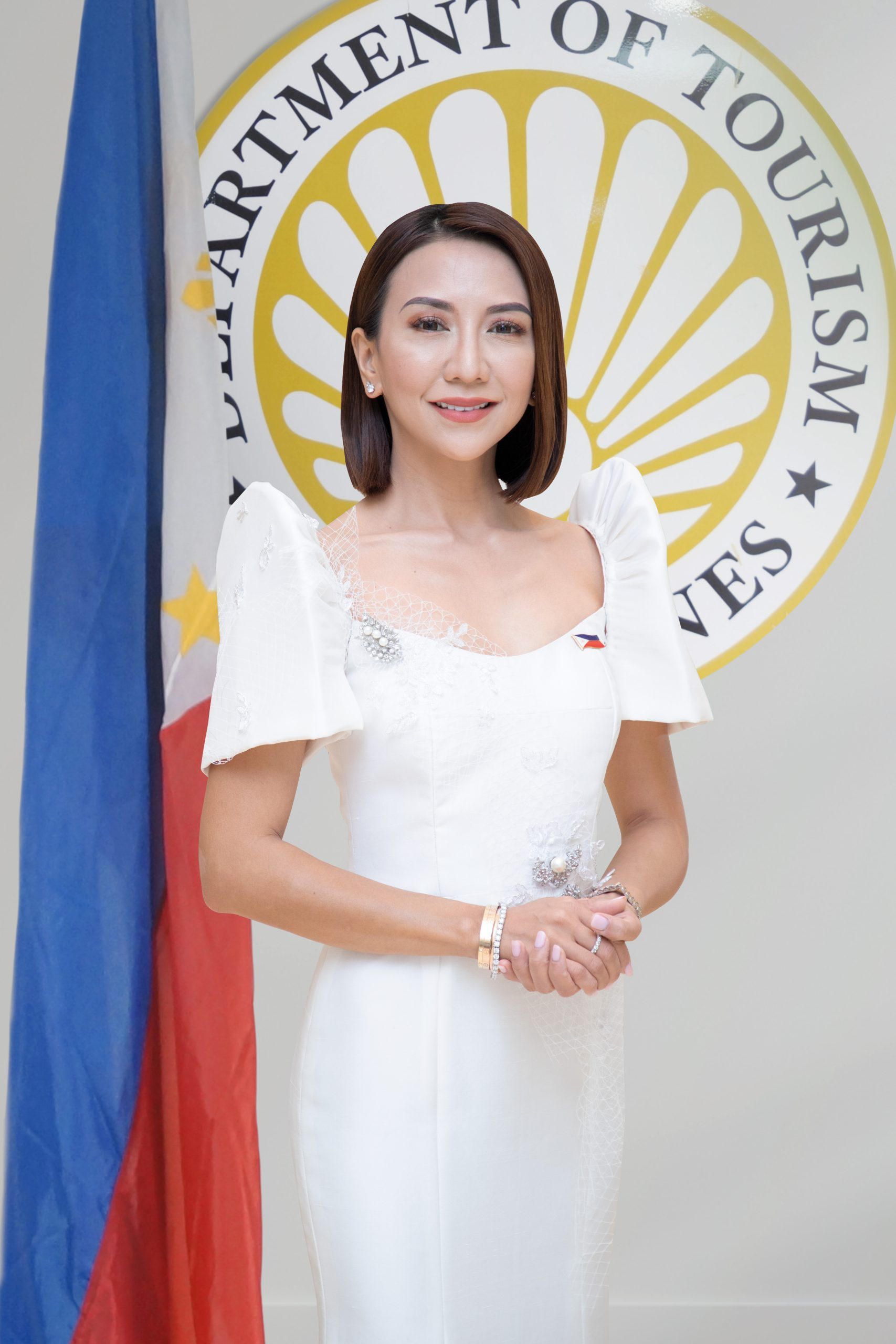
- Official portrait, 2022

Secretary of Tourism
- In office June 30, 2022 – March 12, 2026
- President: Bongbong Marcos
- Preceded by: Bernadette Romulo-Puyat
- Succeeded by: Verna Buensuceso (OIC); Dita Angara-Mathay

Presidential Adviser for Sustainable and Resilient Communities
- Incumbent
- Assumed office March 12, 2026

Mayor of Liloan, Cebu
- In office June 30, 2016 – June 30, 2022
- Vice Mayor: Vincent Franco Frasco (2016–2019); Thelma Jordan (2019–2022); Aljew Frasco (2022)
- Preceded by: Vincent Franco Frasco
- Succeeded by: Aljew Frasco

Personal details
- Born: Ma. Esperanza Christina Garcia Codilla; December 25, 1981 (age 44)
- Party: Lakas (2021–present); 1CEBU (2015–present)
- Other political affiliations: PDP–Laban (2017–2021)
- Spouse: Duke Frasco (m. 2009)
- Children: 4
- Parents: Eufrocino Codilla, Jr. (father); Gwendolyn Garcia (mother)
- Education: Ateneo de Manila University (BS, JD)
- Profession: Lawyer

Ma. Esperanza Christina Garcia Codilla-Frasco (born December 25, 1981) is a Filipino lawyer and politician serving as the presidential adviser for sustainable and resilient communities under President Bongbong Marcos since 2026. She previously served as the 18th secretary of tourism under President Marcos from 2022 to 2026, and was the mayor of Liloan, Cebu, from 2016 to 2022.

Frasco is a lawyer by profession, having previously practiced international arbitration and commercial litigation at the Romulo Mabanta Buenaventura Sayoc and Delos Angeles law firm. She is the daughter of Gwendolyn Garcia, who has served as the 24th governor of Cebu, and the granddaughter of former governor and representative Pablo P. Garcia. Some members of the public and media commentators have questioned the optics of Frasco's prominent personal visibility campaigns. Magazine covers, large-format public signage, and highly branded appearances have drawn attention. For critics, the issue is not visibility itself, but timing and emphasis of her persona rather than tourist destinations.

== Education ==
Ma. Esperanza Christina Garcia Codilla-Frasco earned her bachelor's degree in Legal Management from Ateneo de Manila University, followed by the completion of her Juris Doctor at the same institution in 2006. She subsequently passed the bar examinations in 2007.

== Mayor of Liloan (2016–2022) ==
In 2016, Frasco succeeded her husband Duke Frasco as the Mayor of Liloan. Before taking on the role, she served as the first lady of Liloan. She secured re-election for her second term in 2019.

In 2021, Frasco was awarded the Presidential Lingkod Bayan Regional Award by the Civil Service Commission in its 2021 Search for Outstanding Government Workers. The award is conferred upon an individual for exceptional or extraordinary contributions resulting from performance that had nationwide impact on public interest, security, and patrimony.

In a non-commissioned public satisfaction survey published in August 2021, Frasco was the top performing mayor in Central Visayas, ranking number 1 among the 116 mayors in the entire region, and number 1 among all 44 municipal mayors in Cebu.

Under Frasco's administration, Liloan was awarded the Top Philippine Model Municipality in 2019 by The Manila Times. In the same year, Liloan was granted other national awards, namely, the Top Philippine Education Hub for its scholarship program, Top Philippine Retirement Haven, and Top Philippine Wealth Center for business friendliness and proactive programs on infrastructure and economic development. In 2019 and 2020, the Department of Trade and Industry named Liloan as the Most Resilient Municipality in the Philippines.

In 2019, Frasco was elected as president of the League of Municipalities of the Philippines (LMP) – Cebu Chapter, the first woman to hold the position, and as National Vice President of LMP. In July 2021, Frasco was appointed as the spokesperson of Davao City Mayor Sara Duterte.

== Secretary of Tourism (2022–2026) ==
In the 2022 Cebu local elections, Frasco won a third term as mayor. However, she was later selected as the next Secretary of Tourism by president-elect Bongbong Marcos. She resigned as mayor and was succeeded by her running mate and cousin-in-law, Aljew Frasco, who was initially elected as vice mayor that year.

During Frasco's tenure as tourism secretary, the Love the Philippines tourism slogan was adopted beginning in 2023, replacing the decade-long It's More Fun in the Philippines! slogan.

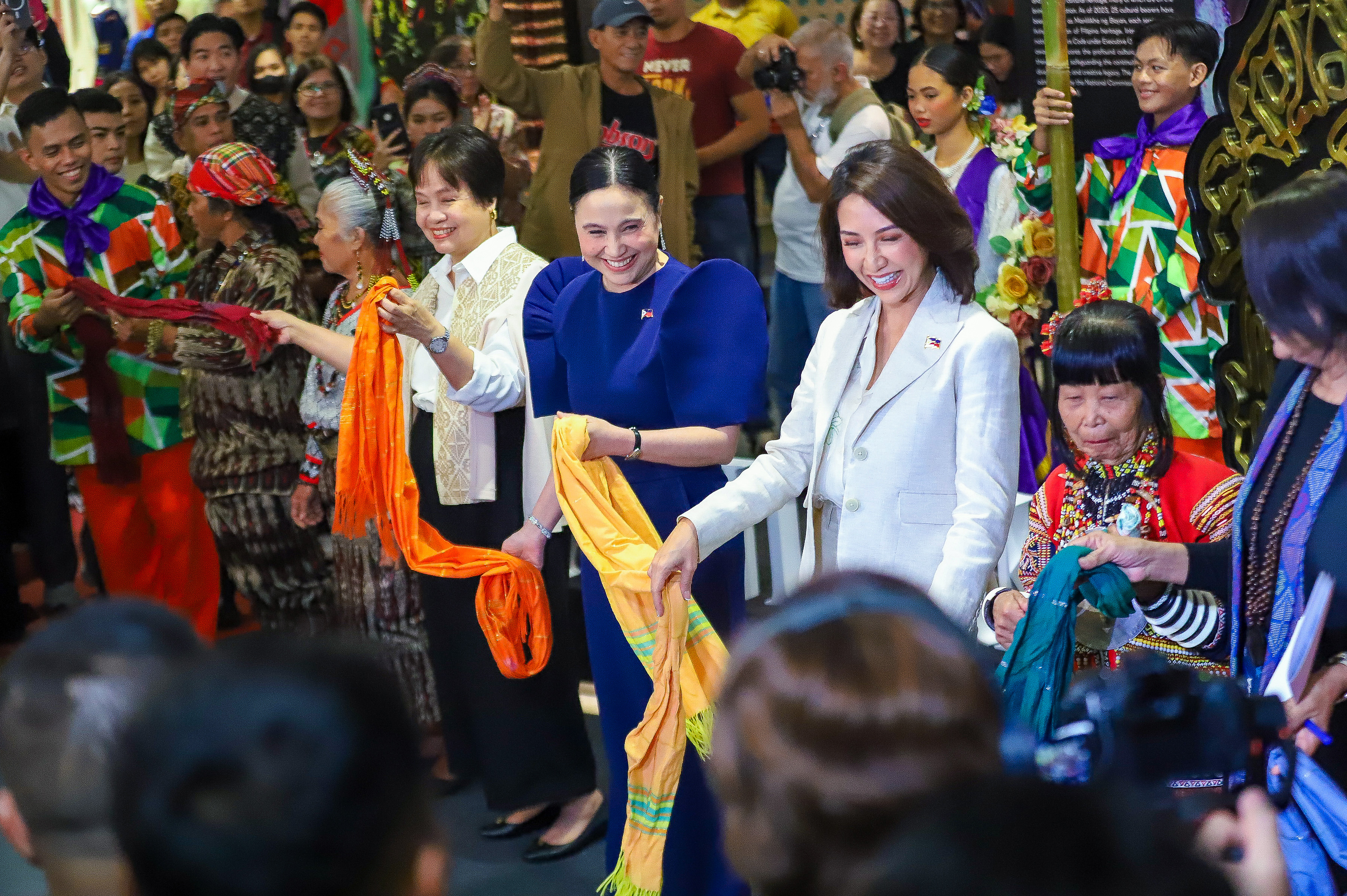
Frasco attending the National Arts and Crafts Fair with Trade and Industry Secretary Cristina Aldeguer-Roque at SM Megamall in Mandaluyong, October 24, 2024.

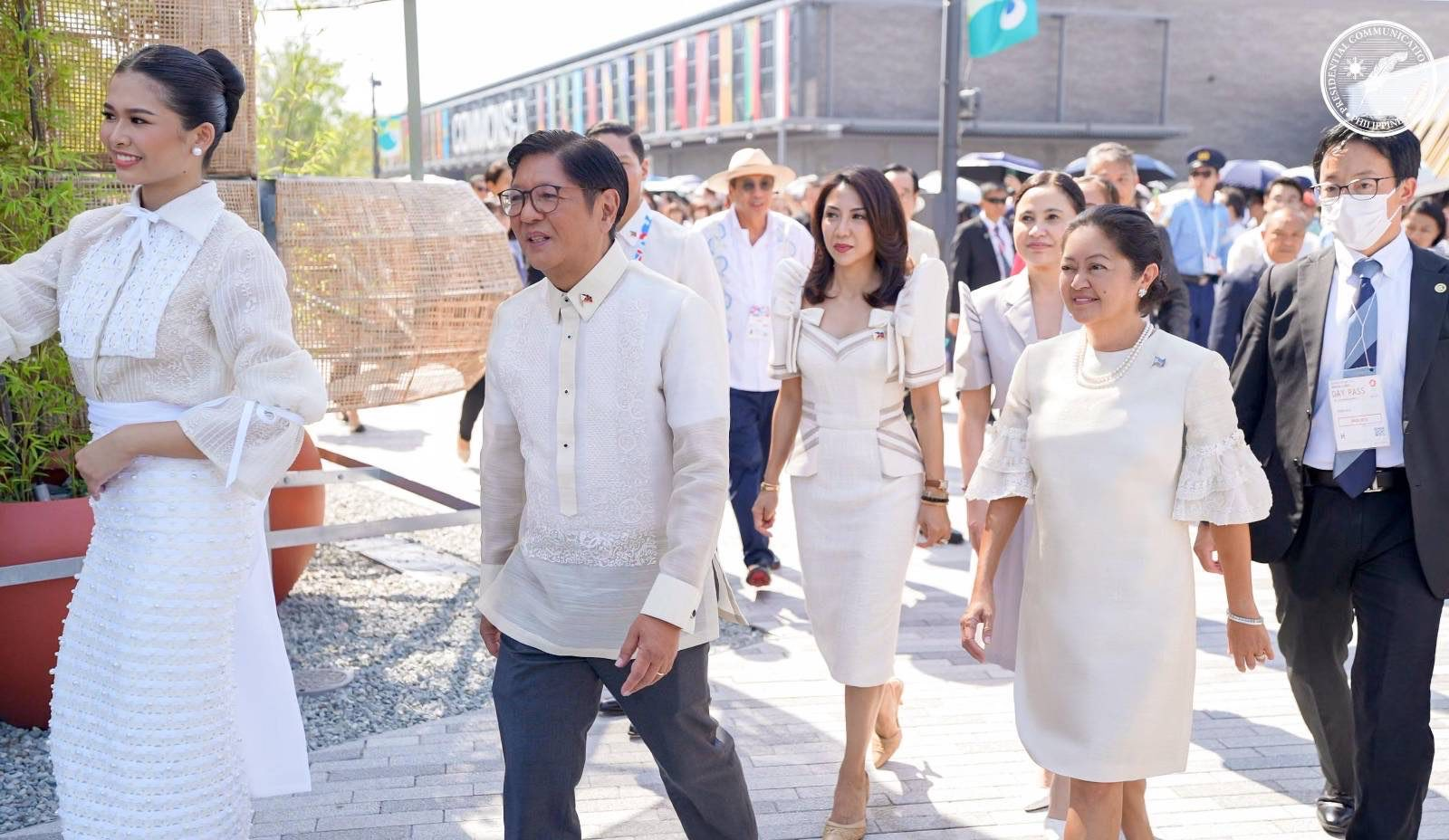
Frasco (center) visiting the Philippine Pavilion at Expo 2025 in Osaka with President Bongbong Marcos and First Lady Liza Araneta Marcos, June 21, 2025.

On May 22, 2025, Frasco, along with other secretaries, tendered courtesy resignations from their respective cabinet posts by President Marcos after he called for a cabinet overhaul in the aftermath of the May 12, 2025 midterm elections. Frasco continued to serve as secretary until March 12, 2026, when she was appointed as presidential adviser for sustainable and resilient communities and replaced as secretary by tourism undersecretary Verna Buensuceso.

=== Criticism ===
The tourism department under Frasco's leadership met widely shared allegations that it spoiled a ₱49-million rebranding by causing a video production that used stock footage of other countries; a mediocre logo-making; and not using photographers' thousands of shots of tourist spots, favoring the use of the image of Frasco instead.

== Presidential Adviser for Sustainable and Resilient Communities (2026–present) ==
On March 12, 2026, President Bongbong Marcos reassigned Frasco as Presidential Adviser for Sustainable and Resilient Communities, removing her as Secretary of Tourism.

== Personal life ==
Frasco married Vincent "Duke" Frasco, a current member of the House of Representatives representing Cebu's 5th congressional district, on August 8, 2009. They have four children together.

== Electoral history ==
Electoral history of Christina Frasco
Year	Office	Party		Votes received				Result
Year	Office	Local	National	Total	%	P.	Swing	Result
2016	Mayor of Liloan	1CEBU	—N/a	29,410	—N/a	1st	—N/a	Won
2019	Mayor of Liloan	1CEBU	PDP–Laban	31,850	57.47%	1st	—N/a	Won
2022	Mayor of Liloan	1CEBU	Lakas	59,095	86.05%	1st	—N/a	Won

Political offices
Preceded by Vincent Franco Frasco	Mayor of Liloan, Cebu; 2016–2022	Succeeded by Aljew Frasco
Preceded by Bernadette Romulo-Puyat	Secretary of Tourism; 2022–present	Incumbent
Order of precedence
Preceded by Jonvic Remulla as Secretary of the Interior and Local Government	Order of Precedence of the Philippines as Secretary of Tourism	Succeeded by Giovanni Lopez as Acting Secretary of Transportation
