= Evelyn B. Pantig =

Evelyn Pantig

Secretary of Tourism
- Officer-in-Charge
- In office September 1 – November 29, 2004
- President: Gloria Macapagal Arroyo
- Preceded by: Roberto Pagdanganan
- Succeeded by: Ace Durano
- In office March 29 – April 7, 1996 (Acting)
- President: Fidel V. Ramos
- Preceded by: Eduardo Pilapil
- Succeeded by: Mina Gabor

Evelyn B. Pantig is a Filipino civil servant and former chairwoman of the National Commission for Culture and the Arts and former undersecretary for tourism of the Philippines in the Corazon Aquino and Gloria Macapagal Arroyo administrations.

== Biography ==
She was the vice chair and later chair of the National Commission for Culture and the Arts from 2003 to 2005. She was appointed the officer-in-charge of the Department of Tourism in 1996 and in 2004.

Pantig graduated of Bachelor of Science in Chemical Engineering from Mapua Institute of Technology. She was scholar in tourism planning in developing economies at the University of Bradford. She got her master's degree in Business Administration from De La Salle University and later her doctorate degree from the Philippine Women's University.
