= Dita Angara-Mathay =

Filipino diplomat

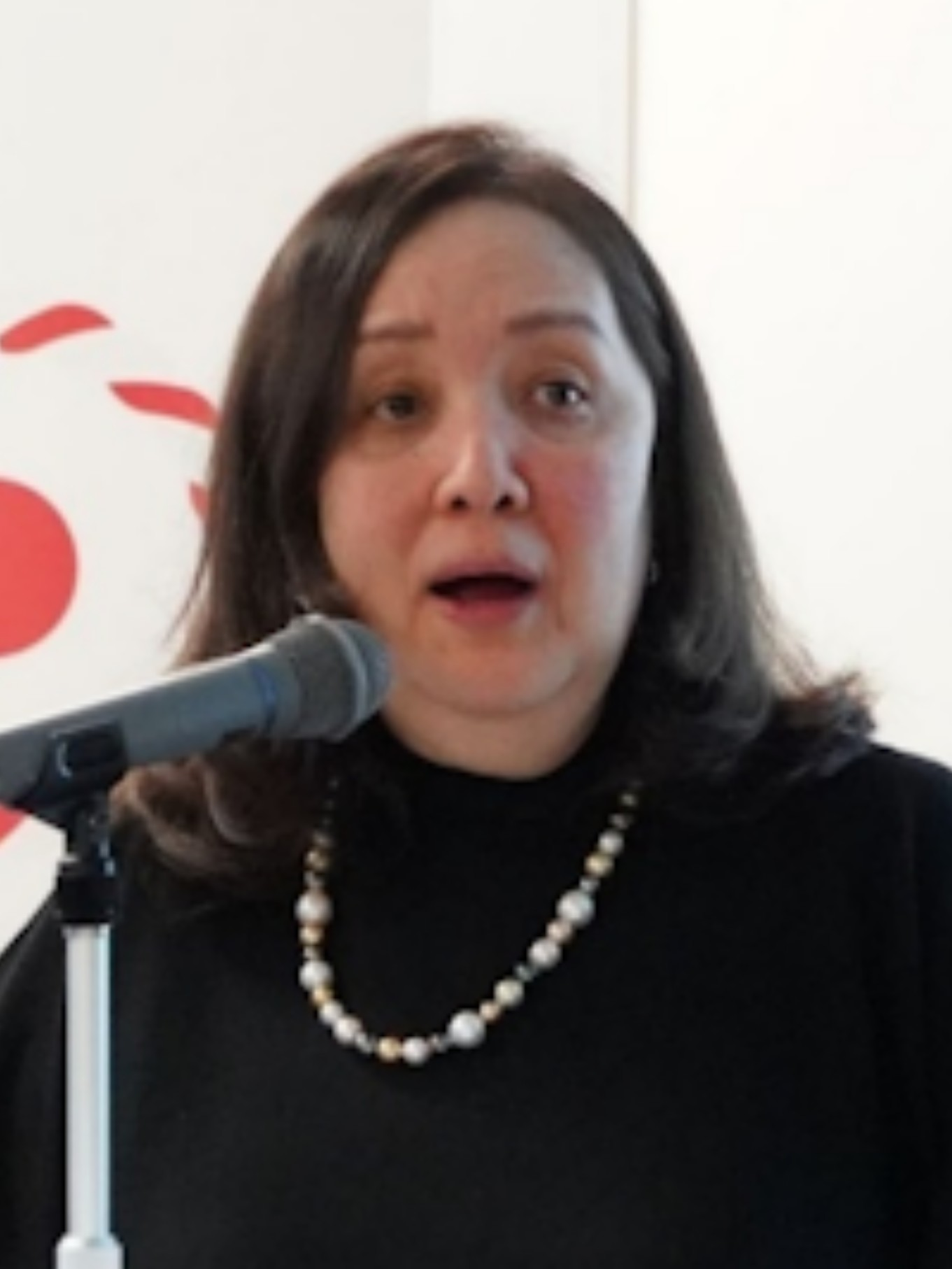
- Angara-Mathay in 2026

Secretary of Tourism
- Ad interim
- Assumed office April 10, 2026
- President: Bongbong Marcos
- Preceded by: Christina Frasco; Verna Buensuceso (OIC)

Personal details
- Born: Maria Bernardita Angara
- Spouse: Robbie Mathay
- Relatives: Angara family
- Profession: Diplomat

Maria Bernardita "Dita" Angara-Mathay is a Filipino diplomat who has served as the ad interim secretary of tourism since 2026. She previously served as member of the Foreign Trade Service Corps in the Department of Trade and Industry.

== Early life and career ==
Maria Bernardita Angara-Mathay was born to a political family based in Aurora. Among her relatives is fellow cabinet member Sonny Angara, who has served as the secretary of education since 2024.

== Career ==
Angara-Mathay has been a longtime member of the Foreign Trade Service Corps under the Department of Trade and Industry. During her tenure in the corps, she served as the commercial counselor and a senior special trade representative of the Philippines in the department's office in Tokyo, Japan. In her latter role, she represented the country in dialogues and international summits regarding electronics and textiles, including the SEMI Southeast Asia Investment Forum in January 2025 and the Rakuten Fashion Week Tokyo in September 2025. The department credited Angara-Mathay for bringing over ₱56.35 billion in investments in the country, which led to the creation of 14,600 jobs.

== Secretary of Tourism (2026–present) ==
In February 2026, Tourism Secretary Christina Frasco faced backlash for allowing the publication of promotional material prominently featuring her likeness, which some deemed self-promotional. Later that March, reports emerged that Frasco was intending to step down from her post, with Angara-Mathay already being vetted as her successor.

The former would be appointed as a presidential adviser on March 12, with Undersecretary Verna Buensuceso temporarily taking over as an officer-in-charge. President Bongbong Marcos formally appointed Angara-Mathay as secretary of tourism on April 10. The Presidential Communications Office signaled that her appointment aimed to attract investments in the country to position tourism as a "a strong driver of jobs, businesses, and regional development".

== Personal life ==
Angara-Mathay is married to Robbie Mathay, a former president of the Aurora Pacific Economic Zone and Freeport Authority.

Political offices
Preceded by Verna Buensuceso; Officer-in-Charge	Secretary of Tourism (Ad interim); 2026–present	Incumbent
Order of precedence
Preceded by Jonvic Remulla as Secretary of the Interior and Local Government	Order of Precedence of the Philippines as Secretary of Tourism (Ad interim)	Succeeded by Vince Dizon as Secretary of Transportation
