= Victoria Sy-Alvarado =

Filipino politician

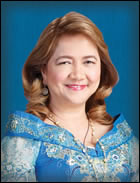

Member of the Philippine House of Representatives from First district of Bulacan
- In office June 30, 2007 – June 30, 2016
- Preceded by: Wilhelmino Sy-Alvarado
- Succeeded by: Jose Antonio Sy-Alvarado

Personal details
- Born: Maria Victoria Reyes; March 23, 1957 (age 69)
- Party: NUP (2011–present)
- Other political affiliations: Lakas (2006–2011)
- Spouse: Wilhelmino Sy-Alvarado
- Children: 7
- Occupation: Politician

Maria Victoria Sy-Alvarado (née Reyes; born March 23, 1957) is a Filipino politician. A former member of the Lakas–CMD, she served as a Member of the House of Representatives of the Philippines, representing the First District of Bulacan from 2007 to 2016.

She is the wife of her predecessor in Congress, Wilhelmino Sy-Alvarado, who served as the Governor of Bulacan from 2010 to 2019. Despite her successful reelection bid in 2010 over former Governor Roberto Pagdanganan, her seat in the Congress became vacant due to the deferring of the election made by the election for the new Malolos representation.

Malolos was ruled by the Supreme Court unconstitutional, saying it violated Article VI Section 5 (3) of the Constitution and Section 3 of the Ordinance attached to constitution; Malolos was ruled not to have exceeded the 250,000 population for a separate legislative district. A special election was held on November 13, 2010, and she was successful in her race.

She served until 2016 and was succeeded by her son, Jose Antonio Sy-Alvarado.

House of Representatives of the Philippines
Preceded by Wilhelmino Sy-Alvarado	Member of the House of Representatives from Bulacan's 1st district 2007–2016	Succeeded by Jose Antonio Sy-Alvarado
