= Secretary of Tourism (Philippines) =

Head of the Department of Tourism of the Philippines

- Kalihim ng Turismo
- Official seal of the Department of Tourism

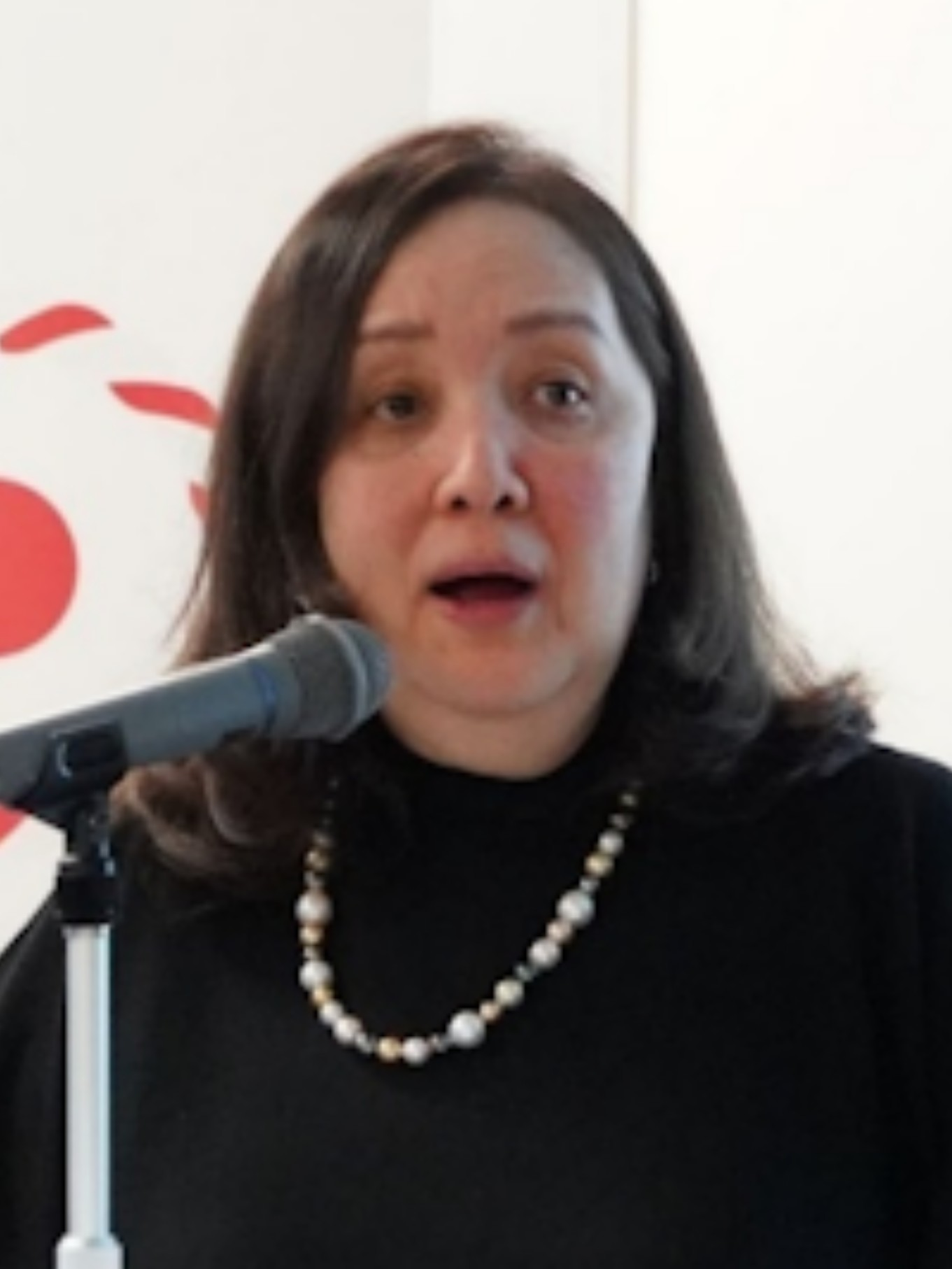
- Incumbent; Dita Angara-Mathay since April 10, 2026
- Style: The Honorable
- Member of: Cabinet
- Appointer: President of the Philippines (with the consent of the Commission on Appointments)
- Term length: No fixed term
- Inaugural holder: Jose D. Aspiras
- Formation: May 11, 1973 (53 years ago)
- Website: www.tourism.gov.ph

The secretary of tourism is the head of the Department of Tourism, the executive department of the Philippine government responsible for the regulation, planning, and promotion of the Philippine tourism industry. The secretary is a member of the Cabinet and serves as the principal adviser to the president of the Philippines on tourism policy.

The position was established on May 11, 1973, when President Ferdinand Marcos created the Department of Tourism through Presidential Decree No. 189. The current secretary is Dita Angara-Mathay, who assumed office on April 10, 2026.

== History ==
The position was created on May 11, 1973, through Presidential Decree No. 189, which established the Department of Tourism as a separate cabinet-level agency by splitting it from the former Department of Trade and Tourism. Jose Aspiras was appointed as the first secretary of tourism, serving from 1973 until the People Power Revolution in 1986—the longest tenure of any tourism secretary at nearly 13 years.

Following the adoption of the 1973 Philippine Constitution, which introduced a semi-parliamentary structure, the position was retitled Minister of Tourism. This title remained in use until President Corazon Aquino issued Executive Order No. 120 on January 30, 1987, which provided that upon adoption of the new Constitution establishing a presidential system, "the Ministry shall be called Department of Tourism and the titles of Minister, Deputy Minister, and Assistant Minister shall be changed to Secretary, Undersecretary and Assistant Secretary, respectively."

The secretary's powers and responsibilities were substantially expanded and codified by Republic Act No. 9593, the Tourism Act of 2009, signed by President Gloria Macapagal Arroyo on May 12, 2009.

== Appointment ==
The secretary of tourism derives constitutional authority from Article VII, Section 16 of the 1987 Philippine Constitution, which provides that "The President shall nominate and, with the consent of the Commission on Appointments, appoint the heads of the executive departments."

The appointment process requires presidential nomination followed by confirmation by the Commission on Appointments, a constitutional body composed of senators and representatives. The nominee appears before the CA Committee on Tourism and Economic Development for deliberation before endorsement to the plenary for final confirmation. Appointments made while Congress is in recess are designated "ad interim" and lapse if not confirmed before adjournment, requiring renomination.

Cabinet secretaries are bound by Article VII, Section 13 of the Constitution, which prohibits them from holding other government offices or practicing any profession during their tenure.

== Powers and responsibilities ==
Under Section 6 of Republic Act No. 9593, the secretary of tourism exercises authority over tourism policy and regulation. The secretary's functions include:

- Formulating and supervising tourism policies, plans, programs, and projects
- Coordinating with government agencies to implement tourism programs
- Communicating to the president the impact of proposed governmental actions upon tourism
- Representing the Philippines in domestic and international conferences concerning tourism, including treaty negotiations
- Formulating rules governing the operation of tourism enterprises
- Establishing national standards for licensing and accreditation of tourism establishments
- Monitoring travel conditions and issuing safety advisories
- Supporting the protection of historical, cultural, and natural endowments

=== Ex-officio positions ===
The Tourism Act of 2009 vests the secretary with extensive ex-officio positions across government bodies:

Position	Body	Legal basis
Chairperson	Tourism Promotions Board	RA 9593, Sec. 47
Chairperson	TIEZA Board of Directors	RA 9593, Sec. 65
Chairperson	Duty Free Philippines Corporation Board	RA 9593, Sec. 91
Chairperson	Philippine Retirement Authority Board of Trustees	RA 9593, Sec. 30
Chairperson	Philippine Commission on Sports Scuba Diving Board	RA 9593, Sec. 31
Vice-Chairperson	Civil Aeronautics Board	RA 9593, Sec. 96
Vice-Chairperson	Governing boards of international airports	RA 9593, Sec. 96
Member	Civil Aviation Authority of the Philippines Board	RA 9593, Sec. 96

== Rank and compensation ==
The secretary of tourism holds Salary Grade 31 under the Salary Standardization Law, equivalent to all Department Secretaries.

The secretary of tourism is not in the constitutional line of presidential succession, which under Article VII, Section 8 passes from the vice president to the Senate president to the speaker of the House.

== List of secretaries of tourism ==
=== Secretary of Tourism (1973–1978) ===
	Portrait	Name (Birth–Death)	Took office	Left office	President
1		Jose Aspiras (1924–1999)	May 11, 1973	June 2, 1978	Ferdinand Marcos

=== Minister of Tourism (1978–1987) ===
	Portrait	Name (Birth–Death)	Took office	Left office	President
2		Jose D. Aspiras (1924–1999)	June 2, 1978	February 25, 1986	Ferdinand Marcos
3		Jose Antonio U. Gonzales	February 25, 1986	February 11, 1987	Corazon Aquino

=== Secretary of Tourism (1987–present) ===
	Portrait	Name (Birth–Death)	Took office	Left office	President
3		Jose Antonio U. Gonzales	February 11, 1987	April 14, 1989	Corazon Aquino
		Narzalina Z. Lim; Acting	April 15, 1989	June 7, 1989	Corazon Aquino
4		Peter D. Garrucho Jr.	June 8, 1989	January 8, 1991	Corazon Aquino
5		Rafael Alunan III (born 1948)	January 9, 1991	February 16, 1992	Corazon Aquino
		Narzalina Z. Lim; Acting	February 17, 1992	September 10, 1992	Corazon Aquino
		Narzalina Z. Lim; Acting	February 17, 1992	September 10, 1992	Fidel V. Ramos
6		Vicente T. Carlos	September 11, 1992	July 3, 1995	Fidel V. Ramos
7		Eduardo P. Pilapil	July 4, 1995	March 28, 1996	Fidel V. Ramos
		Evelyn B. Pantig; Acting	March 29, 1996	April 7, 1996	Fidel V. Ramos
8		Mina T. Gabor	April 8, 1996	June 30, 1998	Fidel V. Ramos
9		Gemma Cruz-Araneta (born 1943)	July 1, 1998	January 19, 2001	Joseph Estrada
10		Dick Gordon (born 1945)	January 20, 2001	January 4, 2004	Gloria Macapagal Arroyo
		Robert Dean Barbers; Officer in Charge	January 5, 2004	February 25, 2004	Gloria Macapagal Arroyo
11		Roberto Pagdanganan (born 1946)	February 26, 2004	August 31, 2004	Gloria Macapagal Arroyo
		Evelyn B. Pantig; Acting	September 1, 2004	November 29, 2004	Gloria Macapagal Arroyo
12		Ace Durano (born 1970)	November 30, 2004	June 30, 2010	Gloria Macapagal Arroyo
13		Alberto Lim	June 30, 2010	August 12, 2011	Benigno Aquino III
14		Ramon Jimenez Jr. (1955–2020)	September 1, 2011	June 30, 2016	Benigno Aquino III
15		Wanda Tulfo Teo (born 1952)	June 30, 2016	May 8, 2018	Rodrigo Duterte
16		Bernadette Romulo-Puyat (born 1971)	May 11, 2018	June 30, 2022	Rodrigo Duterte
17		Christina Frasco (born 1981) (Note: Secretary Frasco took a leave of absence from July 13 to 21, 2023, amid the "Love the Philippines" branding controversy, with Undersecretary Elaine Bathan serving as Officer in Charge.)	June 30, 2022	March 12, 2026	Bongbong Marcos
		Verna Buensuceso; Officer in Charge	March 18, 2026	April 9, 2026	Bongbong Marcos
18		Dita Angara-Mathay	April 10, 2026	Incumbent	Bongbong Marcos

== See also ==
- Department of Tourism (Philippines)
- Tourism in the Philippines
- Cabinet of the Philippines
