= Danny Domingo =

Filipino politician

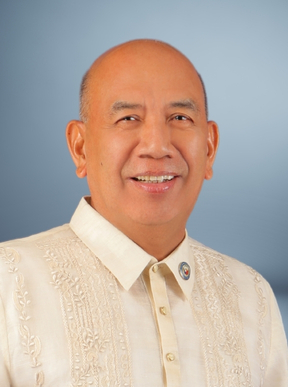
- Official portrait, 2025

Member of the Philippine House of Representatives from Bulacan's 1st district
- Incumbent
- Assumed office June 30, 2022
- Preceded by: Jose Antonio Sy-Alvarado

Member-elect of the Philippine House of Representatives from Malolos's at-large district
- Election nullified before taking office

Mayor of Malolos
- In office July 1986 – March 1987 (as Officer in Charge); June 30, 1988 – March 27, 1998
- Preceded by: Purificacion Reyes
- Succeeded by: Vicente Cruz
- In office June 30, 2001 – June 30, 2010
- Preceded by: Restituto Roque
- Succeeded by: Christian Natividad

Vice Mayor of Malolos
- In office June 30, 1980 – June 30, 1986
- Mayor: Purificacion Reyes

Personal details
- Born: Danilo Albania Domingo; December 24, 1951 (age 74) Malolos, Bulacan, Philippines
- Party: NUP (2021–present)
- Other political affiliations: UNA (2012–2021); Liberal (2009–2012); KAMPI (2007–2009); Lakas (2004–2007); LDP (2001–2004)
- Spouse: Aurora Domingo
- Education: University of the Philippines College of Law (LL.B.)
- Occupation: Politician
- Profession: Lawyer

Danilo Albania Domingo (born December 24, 1951), also known as Danny DAD, is a Filipino lawyer and politician serving as the representative of Bulacan's 1st congressional district since 2022. He previously served multiple terms as mayor of Malolos.

== Early life and education ==
Domingo was born on December 24, 1951 in Malolos, Bulacan to Fernando Domingo Sr., who worked for Meralco, and Placida Albania, a vendor at the Malolos Public Market.

He pursued his elementary education at Barasoain Memorial Elementary School and secondary education at Marcelo H. Del Pilar High School. He obtained his law degree at the University of the Philippines College of Law and was admitted to the bar in 1976.

== Career ==
Domingo began his political career as vice mayor of Malolos, serving from 1980 to 1986. He was then appointed officer-in-charge (OIC) mayor in 1986, before being elected mayor for three consecutive terms from 1988 to 1998. After a brief hiatus, he returned to the post in 2001 and served for three more consecutive terms until 2010.

Aside from his political career, Domingo worked as a legal consultant for the Philippine Veterans Affairs Office from 1998 to 2001 and as legal counsel for the Bulacan League of Municipalities 1995 from 1998 during his term as Malolos mayor.

In May 2010, Domingo was elected representative for the newly created lone district of Malolos, but was nullified as the district's creation was deemed unconstitutional by the Supreme Court due to the city's insufficient population. He then withdrew his congressional candidacy from the subsequent November 2010 special election for Bulacan's 1st congressional district.

In 2022, Domingo was elected representative of Bulacan's 1st congressional district, unseating incumbent Jose Antonio Sy-Alvarado. He was re-elected in 2025.

=== Issues and advocacies ===
In May 2025, Domingo supported calls to investigate the contractor of the Bustos Dam after one of its gates burst, raising concerns over the use of substandard.

== 2025 Flood control projects controversy ==
During the 2025–2026 Philippine anti-corruption protests and the ensuing Senate Blue Ribbon Committee inquiries into anomalous flood management infrastructure, Domingo's congressional district (Bulacan's 1st district) was identified as a focal point for non-existent "ghost" projects and substandard public works. Although Domingo faced public backlash due to the geographic concentration of the anomalies in Bulacan, his legal counsel noted that no credible allegations or formal charges had been made against him.

On December 3, 2025, Domingo voluntarily appeared before the Independent Commission for Infrastructure (ICI) in an approved executive session. He categorically denied receiving any commissions or kickbacks from flood control allocations in his district, maintaining that he had no involvement in the anomalous Department of Public Works and Highways (DPWH) contracts.

Subsequent investigations by the Department of Justice (DOJ) established that the corruption scheme in Bulacan was orchestrated by high-ranking DPWH officials. In January 2026, the DOJ officially admitted former DPWH Undersecretary Roberto Bernardo and former Bulacan District Engineer Henry Alcantara into the Witness Protection Program (WPP) as state witnesses. Sworn testimonies and DOJ case build-ups revealed the procedures of the operation: Bernardo utilized his position to funnel billions of pesos into the Bulacan 1st District Engineering Office, while Alcantara and his subordinates signed certifications of completion for non-existent projects to systematically extract kickbacks. As part of their admission of guilt and state witness agreements, Bernardo and Alcantara are undergoing restitution to return stolen public funds to the national treasury, with Alcantara alone remitting over ₱181 million.
