= Bernadette Romulo-Puyat =

Filipino economist and government official

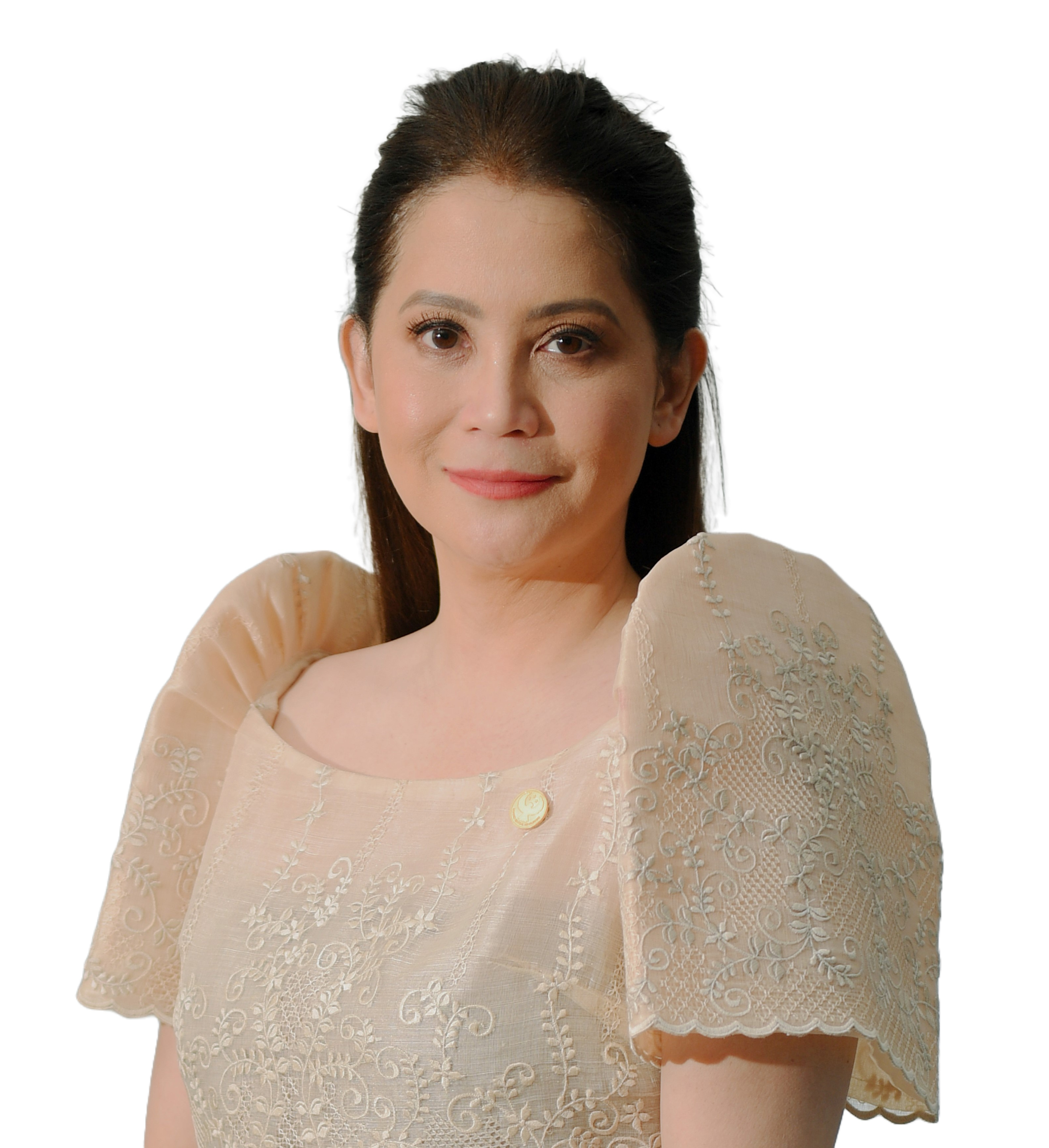

Deputy Governor of Bangko Sentral ng Pilipinas for Regional Operations and Advocacy Sector
- Incumbent
- Assumed office June 6, 2022
- President: Rodrigo Duterte; Bongbong Marcos
- Governor: Benjamin Diokno; Felipe Medalla; Eli M. Remolona Jr.

Secretary of Tourism
- In office May 11, 2018 – June 30, 2022
- President: Rodrigo Duterte
- Preceded by: Wanda Tulfo Teo
- Succeeded by: Christina Frasco

Personal details
- Born: Bernadette Fatima Tecson Romulo; May 14, 1971 (age 55) Quezon City, Philippines
- Party: Lakas–CMD (2004)
- Spouse: David Puyat (died 2010)
- Relations: Pio Valenzuela (great-grandfather); Carlos P. Romulo (granduncle); Roman Romulo (brother)
- Children: 2
- Parent(s): Alberto Romulo and Lovely Tecson
- Education: University of the Philippines Diliman (BEcon, M.Ec)

Bernadette Fatima Tecson Romulo-Puyat (born May 14, 1971) is a Filipino government official, economist, and academic who served as the Secretary of Tourism under the Duterte administration from May 2018 to June 2022, heading the Philippines' tourism industry through the disruptions caused by the COVID-19 pandemic in the Philippines. She has since been appointed Deputy Governor of the Bangko Sentral ng Pilipinas in charge of financial inclusion, regional operations, and the BSP's Program Management Office. Her previous positions include terms as a consultant for the Presidential Management Staff, Undersecretary for the Department of Agriculture, and lecturer at the UP School of Economics.

== Early life and education ==
Bernadette Romulo-Puyat is the fourth amongst the five children of Filipino politician and diplomat, Alberto Romulo and Lovely Tecson. She attended the University of the Philippines Diliman and pursued an undergraduate and a master's degree in economics. She once aspired to become like her mother but later on, considering her exposure and familiarity to politics at early age, she ended up joining the Philippine political scene.

== Career ==
=== Early career ===
Romulo-Puyat was an instructor at the UP School of Economics. After a career in academia, she joined politics in 2004 by attempting to become the First District Representative of Quezon City. However, she lost the elections to Vincent Crisologo by 2,000 votes with Puyat readily conceding Crisologo's victory and deciding to thereafter spend more time with her family instead. Her brief political experience made her more aware of the conditions of the people affected by poverty, as a result, she put up "Botika ng Bayan" (People's Pharmacy) across some areas in Metro Manila to provide affordable medicines or generic drugs.

=== As Presidential Management Staff consultant ===
Puyat also worked with the Presidential Management Staff (PMS) as deputy cabinet secretary and economic consultant during the tenure of President Gloria Macapagal Arroyo.

=== As agriculture undersecretary (2007–2018) ===
In January 2007, Puyat became the undersecretary for special concerns at the Department of Agriculture (DA) under the former Secretary Arthur Yap. She ensured that foreign grants were directed accordingly to projects intended for farmers. She also focused on working with the agricultural concerns of women from the rural community that include financing technical support in provision of seedlings, planting materials, fermentation boxes and processing equipment for the Manobo women farmers, promotion and marketing of agricultural products for the coffee farmers across Kalinga, Bukidnon and Mt. Kanlaon; and pili, cacao and cassava farmers across Camarines Sur. She also took part in the establishment of an organic village for indigenous women farmers in Davao.

=== Secretary of Tourism (2018–2022) ===
Following the resignation of Wanda Teo due to her alleged involvement with issues surrounding a ₱60 million tourism advertisement placement on People's Television Network (PTV), Bernadette Romulo-Puyat was appointed by President Rodrigo Duterte as Secretary of the Department of Tourism (DOT) on May 11, 2018. Romulo-Puyat announced her plan to give farm tourism a focus and also made review on the Philippines' possible hosting of the Miss Universe 2018 pageant which her predecessor was involved in. Romulo-Puyat dropped the Philippines' hosting bid due to budgetary concerns.

In her first month as Secretary of Tourism, Romulo-Puyat alleged that corruption was rampant in the DOT, claiming the existence of schemes involving "hundred of millions" of funds within the government agency. She ordered the suspension of all projects of the DOT pending review from the Commission on Audit. She also directed all undersecretaries and assistant secretaries, including Cesar Montano and Kat de Castro, to submit their courtesy resignations except for undersecretary Bong Bengzon.

== Personal life ==
Romulo-Puyat was married to David Puyat, a lawyer, until his death in 2010. She has two children. Romulo-Puyat began dating politician Charlie Cojuangco in 2016, though they eventually separated sometime before 2020.

Although rumors persisted that she had dated Davao City mayor Rodrigo Duterte during her tenure as agriculture undersecretary, Duterte denied the allegation in 2018, stating that she was simply his good friend from working with each other in government.

Political offices
Preceded by Wanda Tulfo Teo	Secretary of Tourism; 2018–2022	Succeeded by Christina Frasco
