= Jose Antonio Sy-Alvarado =

Filipino politician

The Honorable Jose Antonio Sy-Alvarado

Member of the Philippine House of Representatives from Bulacan's 1st district
- In office June 30, 2016 – June 30, 2022
- Preceded by: Victoria Sy-Alvarado
- Succeeded by: Danny Domingo

Personal details
- Born: Jose Antonio Reyes Sy-Alvarado; January 7, 1983 (age 43) Hagonoy, Bulacan, Philippines
- Party: PDP–Laban (2021–present)
- Other political affiliations: NUP (2018–2021); Liberal (2015–2018)
- Parents: Wilhelmino Sy-Alvarado (father); Victoria Sy-Alvarado (mother)
- Education: San Beda College
- Occupation: Politician
- Profession: Businessman
- Nickname(s): Jonathan, Kuya Jose

Jose Antonio Reyes Sy-Alvarado (born January 7, 1983) is a Filipino politician and businessman who last served as a Member of the House of Representatives of the Philippines, representing the 1st district of Bulacan from 2016 to 2022.

== Education ==
Sy-Alvarado earned a degree of Business Management major in Entrepreneurship at San Beda College.

== Political career ==
=== Congressional stint (2016-2022) ===
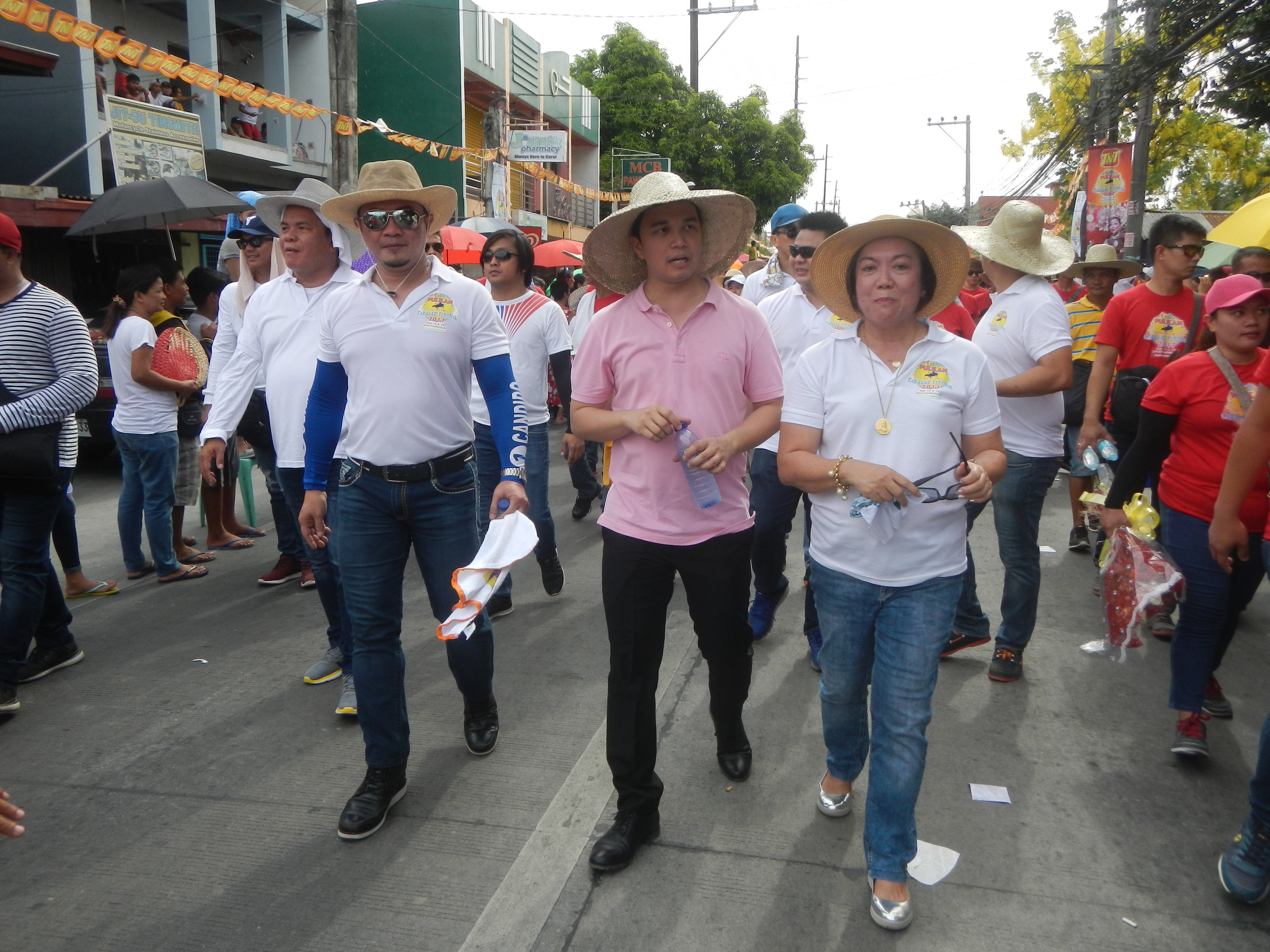
Sy-Alvarado (in pink) during the 2017 Kneeling Carabao Festival in Pulilan

Sy-Alvarado ran for a Congress seat for the First district of Bulacan in the 2016 elections under the then-ruling Liberal Party. He succeeded his mother Victoria Sy-Alvarado. He was reelected for second term in 2019 under the National Unity Party.

During his term, he became the owner and backer of the Bulacan Kuyas, a basketball team that played in the Maharlika Pilipinas Basketball League.

Sy-Alvarado, then chairman of the House Committee on Good Government and Public Accountability, is one of the 70 representatives who voted to deny the ABS-CBN franchise on July 10, 2020. Due to the changes under new House Speaker Lord Allan Velasco, he was removed as the Good Government panel chair. In January 2021, he was announced to be part of the new bloc "BTS sa Kongreso" (named after the K-pop boy band group BTS of South Korea), a coalition group formed by Taguig–Pateros Representative and former House Speaker Alan Peter Cayetano during the 18th Congress.

Sy-Alvarado ran for third and final term in 2022 but lost to former Malolos Mayor Danny Domingo.

== Personal life ==
Jose Antonio is the son of politicians Wilhelmino Sy-Alvarado, who also served as the Governor of Bulacan from 2010 to 2019, and Victoria Sy-Alvarado, whom he succeeded as Representative of Bulacan's 1st congressional district after serving 3 terms from 2007 to 2016. He has 6 more siblings including Maria Rosario S. Mendoza, who currently serves as the mayor of Hagonoy, Bulacan since 2025.

Prior to serving in Congress, he once involved in a car accident which almost killed him.

House of Representatives of the Philippines
Preceded by Victoria Sy-Alvarado	Member of the House of Representatives from Bulacan's 1st district 2016–2022	Succeeded by Danilo Domingo
