= Bulacan's 1st congressional district =

House of Representatives of the Philippines legislative district

- Constituency for the House of Representatives of the Philippines
- Boundary of Bulacan's 1st congressional district in Bulacan
- Location of Bulacan within the Philippines
- Province: Bulacan
- Region: Central Luzon
- Population: 758,872 (2020)
- Electorate: 437,780 (2022)
- Major settlements: 6 LGUs: Cities; Malolos; Municipalities; Bulakan; Calumpit; Hagonoy; Paombong; Pulilan
- Area: 385.73 km^{2} (148.93 sq mi)

Current constituency
- Created: 1907
- Representative: Danny Domingo
- Political party: NUP
- Congressional bloc: Majority

Bulacan's 1st congressional district is one of the seven congressional districts of the Philippines in the province of Bulacan. It has been represented in the House of Representatives of the Philippines since 1916 and earlier in the Philippine Assembly from 1907 to 1916. The district consists of the provincial capital city of Malolos and adjacent municipalities of Bulakan (Bulacan), Calumpit, Hagonoy, Paombong and Pulilan. Until its second dissolution in 1972, it also consisted of Balagtas (formerly Bigaa), Bocaue, Bustos, Guiguinto , and Plaridel (formerly Quingua). It is currently represented in the 20th Congress by Danilo A. Domingo of the National Unity Party (NUP).

== Representation history ==
| # | Image | Member | Term of office | | Legislature | Party | Electoral history | Constituent LGUs |
| # | Image | Member | Start | End | Legislature | Party | Electoral history | Constituent LGUs |
|---|---|---|---|---|---|---|---|---|
=== Bulacan's 1st district for the Philippine Assembly ===
District created January 9, 1907.
| 1 | | Aguedo Velarde | October 16, 1907 | October 16, 1909 | 1st | Nacionalista | Elected in 1907. | 1907–1909; Bulacan, Calumpit, Hagonoy, Malolos, Paombong, Quingua |
| 2 | | Hermogenes Reyes | October 16, 1909 | October 16, 1912 | 2nd | Nacionalista | Elected in 1909. | 1909–1912; Bulacan, Calumpit, Hagonoy, Malolos, Paombong, Pulilan, Quingua |
| (1) | | Aguedo Velarde | October 16, 1912 | December 22, 1913 | 3rd | Nacionalista | Elected in 1912. Died. | 1912–1916; Bigaa, Bulacan, Calumpit, Hagonoy, Malolos, Paombong, Pulilan, Quingua |
| 3 | | Ambrosio Santos | May 15, 1914 | October 16, 1916 | 3rd | Nacionalista | Elected in 1914 to finish Velarde's term. | 1912–1916; Bigaa, Bulacan, Calumpit, Hagonoy, Malolos, Paombong, Pulilan, Quingua |
=== Bulacan's 1st district for the House of Representatives of the Philippine Islands ===
| 4 | | Mariano Escueta | October 16, 1916 | June 3, 1919 | 4th | Liga Popular | Elected in 1916. | 1916–1919; Bigaa, Bocaue, Bulacan, Calumpit, Guiguinto, Hagonoy, Malolos, Paombong, Pulilan, Quingua |
| 5 | | José Padilla | June 3, 1919 | June 5, 1928 | 5th | Demócrata | Elected in 1919. | 1919–1935; Bigaa, Bocaue, Bulacan, Bustos, Calumpit, Guiguinto, Hagonoy, Malolos, Paombong, Pulilan, Quingua |
| 5 | | José Padilla | June 3, 1919 | June 5, 1928 | 6th | Demócrata | Re-elected in 1922. | 1919–1935; Bigaa, Bocaue, Bulacan, Bustos, Calumpit, Guiguinto, Hagonoy, Malolos, Paombong, Pulilan, Quingua |
| 5 | | José Padilla | June 3, 1919 | June 5, 1928 | 7th | Demócrata | Re-elected in 1925. | 1919–1935; Bigaa, Bocaue, Bulacan, Bustos, Calumpit, Guiguinto, Hagonoy, Malolos, Paombong, Pulilan, Quingua |
| 6 | | Ángel Suntay | June 5, 1928 | June 2, 1931 | 8th | Demócrata | Elected in 1928. | 1919–1935; Bigaa, Bocaue, Bulacan, Bustos, Calumpit, Guiguinto, Hagonoy, Malolos, Paombong, Pulilan, Quingua |
| 7 | | Francisco Afan Delgado | June 2, 1931 | September 16, 1935 | 9th | Nacionalista; Consolidado | Elected in 1931. | 1919–1935; Bigaa, Bocaue, Bulacan, Bustos, Calumpit, Guiguinto, Hagonoy, Malolos, Paombong, Pulilan, Quingua |
| 7 | | Francisco Afan Delgado | June 2, 1931 | September 16, 1935 | 10th | Nacionalista; Democrático | Re-elected in 1934. | 1919–1935; Bigaa, Bocaue, Bulacan, Bustos, Calumpit, Guiguinto, Hagonoy, Malolos, Paombong, Pulilan, Quingua |
| # | Image | Member | Term of office | | National Assembly | Party | Electoral history | Constituent LGUs |
| # | Image | Member | Start | End | National Assembly | Party | Electoral history | Constituent LGUs |
=== Bulacan's 1st district for the National Assembly (Commonwealth of the Philippines) ===
| 8 | | Nicolas Buendia | September 16, 1935 | December 30, 1941 | 1st | Nacionalista; Democrático | Elected in 1935. | 1935–1938; Bigaa, Bocaue, Bulacan, Bustos, Calumpit, Guiguinto, Hagonoy, Malolos, Paombong, Pulilan, Quingua |
| 8 | | Nicolas Buendia | September 16, 1935 | December 30, 1941 | 2nd | Nacionalista | Re-elected in 1938. | 1938–1941; Bigaa, Bulacan, Bustos, Calumpit, Guiguinto, Hagonoy, Malolos, Paombong, Plaridel, Pulilan |
District dissolved into the two-seat Bulacan's at-large district for the National Assembly (Second Philippine Republic).
| # | Image | Member | Term of office | | Common wealth Congress | Party | Electoral history | Constituent LGUs |
| # | Image | Member | Start | End | Common wealth Congress | Party | Electoral history | Constituent LGUs |
=== Bulacan's 1st district for the House of Representatives of the Commonwealth of the Philippines ===
District re-created May 24, 1945.
| 9 | | León Valencia | – | – | 1st | Nacionalista | Elected in 1941. Died before start of term. | 1945–1946; Bigaa, Bocaue, Bulacan, Bustos, Calumpit, Guiguinto, Hagonoy, Malolos, Paombong, Plaridel, Pulilan |
| # | Image | Member | Term of office | | Congress | Party | Electoral history | Constituent LGUs |
| # | Image | Member | Start | End | Congress | Party | Electoral history | Constituent LGUs |
=== Bulacan's 1st district for the House of Representatives of the Philippines ===
| 10 | | Jesús B. Lava | – | – | 1st | Democratic Alliance | Elected in 1946. Did not serve term due to electoral protest. | 1946–1969; Bigaa, Bocaue, Bulacan, Bustos, Calumpit, Guiguinto, Hagonoy, Malolos, Paombong, Plaridel, Pulilan |
| 11 | | Florante C. Roque | May 25, 1946 | May 4, 1953 | 1st | Liberal | Declared winner of 1946 elections. | 1946–1969; Bigaa, Bocaue, Bulacan, Bustos, Calumpit, Guiguinto, Hagonoy, Malolos, Paombong, Plaridel, Pulilan |
| 11 | | Florante C. Roque | May 25, 1946 | May 4, 1953 | 2nd | Liberal | Re-elected in 1949. Removed from office after electoral protest. | 1946–1969; Bigaa, Bocaue, Bulacan, Bustos, Calumpit, Guiguinto, Hagonoy, Malolos, Paombong, Plaridel, Pulilan |
| 12 | | Erasmo R. Cruz | May 4, 1953 | December 30, 1957 | 2nd | Nacionalista | Declared winner of 1949 elections. | 1946–1969; Bigaa, Bocaue, Bulacan, Bustos, Calumpit, Guiguinto, Hagonoy, Malolos, Paombong, Plaridel, Pulilan |
| 12 | | Erasmo R. Cruz | May 4, 1953 | December 30, 1957 | 3rd | Nacionalista | Re-elected in 1953. | 1946–1969; Bigaa, Bocaue, Bulacan, Bustos, Calumpit, Guiguinto, Hagonoy, Malolos, Paombong, Plaridel, Pulilan |
| 13 | | José C. Suntay Jr. | December 30, 1957 | December 30, 1961 | 4th | Liberal | Elected in 1957. | 1946–1969; Bigaa, Bocaue, Bulacan, Bustos, Calumpit, Guiguinto, Hagonoy, Malolos, Paombong, Plaridel, Pulilan |
| 14 | | Teodulo Natividad | December 30, 1961 | September 23, 1972 | 5th | Nacionalista | Elected in 1961. | 1946–1969; Bigaa, Bocaue, Bulacan, Bustos, Calumpit, Guiguinto, Hagonoy, Malolos, Paombong, Plaridel, Pulilan |
| 14 | | Teodulo Natividad | December 30, 1961 | September 23, 1972 | 6th | Nacionalista | Re-elected in 1965. | 1946–1969; Bigaa, Bocaue, Bulacan, Bustos, Calumpit, Guiguinto, Hagonoy, Malolos, Paombong, Plaridel, Pulilan |
| 14 | | Teodulo Natividad | December 30, 1961 | September 23, 1972 | 7th | Nacionalista | Re-elected in 1969. Removed from office after imposition of martial law. | 1969–1972; Balagtas, Bocaue, Bulacan, Bustos, Calumpit, Guiguinto, Hagonoy, Malolos, Paombong, Plaridel, Pulilan |
District dissolved into the sixteen-seat Region III's at-large district for the Interim Batasang Pambansa, followed by the four-seat Bulacan's at-large district for the Regular Batasang Pambansa.
District re-created February 2, 1987.
| 15 | | Francisco B. Aniag Jr. | June 30, 1987 | June 30, 1992 | 8th | Lakas ng Bansa | Elected in 1987. | 1987–2007; Bulacan, Calumpit, Hagonoy, Malolos, Paombong, Pulilan |
| 15 | | Francisco B. Aniag Jr. | June 30, 1987 | June 30, 1992 | 8th | LDP | Elected in 1987. | 1987–2007; Bulacan, Calumpit, Hagonoy, Malolos, Paombong, Pulilan |
| (14) | | Teodulo Natividad | June 30, 1992 | January 9, 1997 | 9th | Lakas | Elected in 1992. | 1987–2007; Bulacan, Calumpit, Hagonoy, Malolos, Paombong, Pulilan |
| (14) | | Teodulo Natividad | June 30, 1992 | January 9, 1997 | 10th | Lakas | Re-elected in 1995. Died. | 1987–2007; Bulacan, Calumpit, Hagonoy, Malolos, Paombong, Pulilan |
| 16 | | Wilhelmino Sy-Alvarado | June 30, 1998 | June 30, 2007 | 11th | Lakas | Elected in 1998. | 1987–2007; Bulacan, Calumpit, Hagonoy, Malolos, Paombong, Pulilan |
| 16 | | Wilhelmino Sy-Alvarado | June 30, 1998 | June 30, 2007 | 12th | Lakas | Re-elected in 2001. | 1987–2007; Bulacan, Calumpit, Hagonoy, Malolos, Paombong, Pulilan |
| 16 | | Wilhelmino Sy-Alvarado | June 30, 1998 | June 30, 2007 | 13th | Lakas | Re-elected in 2004. | 1987–2007; Bulacan, Calumpit, Hagonoy, Malolos, Paombong, Pulilan |
| 17 | | Victoria Sy-Alvarado | June 30, 2007 | June 30, 2010 | 14th | Lakas | Elected in 2007. | 2007–2009; Bulakan, Calumpit, Hagonoy, Malolos, Paombong, Pulilan |
| 17 | | Victoria Sy-Alvarado | June 30, 2007 | June 30, 2010 | 15th | Lakas | Re-elected in 2010. Election deferred as Malolos's at-large district was deemed unconstitutional. | 2009–2010; Bulakan, Calumpit, Hagonoy, Paombong, Pulilan |
| 17 | | Victoria Sy-Alvarado | November 15, 2010 | June 30, 2016 | 15th | Lakas | Re-elected in 2010 special election. | 2010–present Bulakan, Calumpit, Hagonoy, Malolos, Paombong, Pulilan |
| 17 | | Victoria Sy-Alvarado | November 15, 2010 | June 30, 2016 | 16th | NUP | Re-elected in 2013. | 2010–present Bulakan, Calumpit, Hagonoy, Malolos, Paombong, Pulilan |
| 18 | | Jose Antonio Sy-Alvarado | June 30, 2016 | June 30, 2022 | 17th | Liberal | Elected in 2016. | 2010–present Bulakan, Calumpit, Hagonoy, Malolos, Paombong, Pulilan |
| 18 | | Jose Antonio Sy-Alvarado | June 30, 2016 | June 30, 2022 | 18th | NUP | Re-elected in 2019. | 2010–present Bulakan, Calumpit, Hagonoy, Malolos, Paombong, Pulilan |
| 18 | | Jose Antonio Sy-Alvarado | June 30, 2016 | June 30, 2022 | 18th | PDP–Laban | Re-elected in 2019. | 2010–present Bulakan, Calumpit, Hagonoy, Malolos, Paombong, Pulilan |
| 19 | | Danilo A. Domingo | June 30, 2022 | Incumbent | 19th | NUP | Elected in 2022. | 2010–present Bulakan, Calumpit, Hagonoy, Malolos, Paombong, Pulilan |
| 19 | | Danilo A. Domingo | June 30, 2022 | Incumbent | 20th | NUP | Re-elected in 2025. | 2010–present Bulakan, Calumpit, Hagonoy, Malolos, Paombong, Pulilan |

== Election results ==
=== 2025 ===
| Candidate | Party | Votes | % |
|---|---|---|---|
| Danny Domingo (incumbent) | NUP | 283,905 | 80.50 |
| Allan Andan | Aksyon | 64,753 | 18.36 |
| Joselito Pinlac | Independent | 4,035 | 1.14 |
| Total | | 352,693 | 100.00 |
| Registered voters/turnout | | 449,028 | – |
| NUP hold | | | |
Source: Commission on Elections

=== 2022 ===
2022 Philippine House of Representatives elections
| Party | Candidate | Votes | % |
|---|---|---|---|
| NUP | Danny Domingo | 202,712 | 58.20 |
| PDP–Laban | Jose Antonio Sy-Alvarado | 140,798 | 40.42 |
| Reform | Kuya Mac de Guzman | 4,748 | 1.36 |
| Total votes | | 348,258 | 100 |
| NUP gain from PDP–Laban | | | |

=== 2019 ===
2019 Philippine House of Representatives elections
| Party | Candidate | Votes | % |
|---|---|---|---|
| NUP | Jose Antonio Sy-Alvarado | 205,400 | 74.55 |
| PDP–Laban | Sander Tantoco | 59,582 | 21.62 |
| Lakas | Sanbon Tantoco | 10,504 | 3.81 |
| Total votes | | 275,486 | 100 |
| NUP hold | | | |

=== 2016 ===
2016 Philippine House of Representatives elections
| Party | Candidate | Votes | % |
|---|---|---|---|
| Liberal | Jose Antonio Sy-Alvarado | 157,828 | |
| NPC | Michael Fermin | 118,663 | |
| Margin of victory | | | |
| Invalid or blank votes | | 33,958 | |
| Total votes | | 310,449 | |
| Liberal gain from NUP | | | |

=== 2013 ===
2013 Philippine House of Representatives elections
| Party | Candidate | Votes | % |
|---|---|---|---|
| NUP | Ma. Victoria Sy-Alvarado | 155,783 | 74.61 |
| Independent | Sahiron Salim | 7,972 | 3.82 |
| Margin of victory | | 147,811 | 70.79% |
| Invalid or blank votes | | 45,041 | 21.57 |
| Total votes | | 208,796 | 100.00 |
| NUP hold | | | |

=== 2010 ===
In 2010, due to the Supreme Court ruling the creation of the congressional district of Malolos as unconstitutional, the election at Bulacan's 1st congressional district originally scheduled for May 2010 was delayed. The ballots were originally printed with Malolos having a different set of candidates from the rest of the 1st district. In the May 2010 general election, balloting for the 1st district was still done, showing incumbent Ma. Victoria Sy-Alvarado with an overwhelming lead over Governor Roberto Pagdanganan in the 1st district, and Danny Domingo also having a majority of the vote in Malolos.

The COMELEC later on ruled that the candidates that were listed in Malolos and the rest of the 1st district shall contest the election. Domingo and Aniag withdrew, Cruz and Valencia did not campaign, while only Sy-Alvarado and Pagdanganan campaigned. Sy-Alvarado won in November 2010.

Philippine House of Representatives special election at Bulacan's 1st district
| Party | Candidate | Votes | % |
|---|---|---|---|
| Lakas–Kampi | Ma. Victoria Sy-Alvarado | 95,625 | 68.77 |
| Nacionalista | Roberto Pagdanganan | 41,658 | 29.96 |
| Liberal | Danny Domingo (withdrew) | 1,032 | 0.74 |
| PMP | Francisco Aniag (withdrew) | 400 | 0.29 |
| Independent | Tomas Valencia | 271 | 0.19 |
| Independent | Francisco Cruz | 63 | 0.05 |
| Total votes | | 139,049 | 100.00 |
| Turnout | | | 40.73 |
| Lakas–Kampi hold | | | |

2010 Philippine House of Representatives elections
| Party | Candidate | Votes | % |
|---|---|---|---|
| Lakas–Kampi | Ma. Victoria Sy-Alvarado | 118,486 | 71.38 |
| Nacionalista | Roberto Pagdanganan | 47,515 | 28.62 |
| Valid ballots | | 116,001 | 87.22 |
| Invalid or blank votes | | 24,380 | 12.78 |
| Total votes | | 190,331 | 100.00 |
| Lakas–Kampi hold | | | |

== See also ==
- Legislative districts of Bulacan
