= Roberto Pagdanganan =

Filipino politician (1988–1998)

The Honorable Roberto Pagdanganan
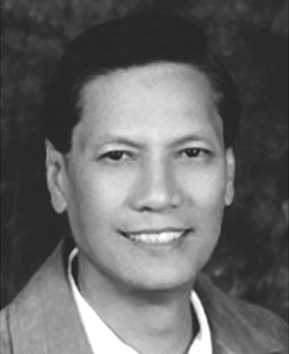

12th Secretary of Tourism
- In office February 26, 2004 – August 31, 2004
- President: Gloria Macapagal Arroyo
- Preceded by: Robert Dean Barbers (acting)
- Succeeded by: Evelyn B. Pantig (acting)

10th Secretary of Agrarian Reform
- In office January 20, 2003 – January 20, 2004
- President: Gloria Macapagal Arroyo
- Preceded by: Hernani Braganza
- Succeeded by: Jose Marie Ponce (acting)

29th Governor of Bulacan
- In office February 2, 1988 – June 30, 1998
- Vice Governor: Ricardo Nicolas (1988–1989); Ramon Villarama (1989–1992); Josefina dela Cruz (1992–1998)
- Preceded by: Amado Pineda
- Succeeded by: Josefina dela Cruz
- In office May 1, 1986 – December 1, 1987
- Vice Governor: Francisco Aniag Jr. (1986–1987); Virgilio Robes (1987)
- Preceded by: Ignacio Santiago Sr.
- Succeeded by: Amado Pineda

Personal details
- Born: Roberto Mamangon Pagdanganan; July 19, 1946 (age 80) Calumpit, Bulacan, Philippines
- Party: Nacionalista (2009–present)
- Other political affiliations: Lakas (1991–2009); NUCD (1986–1991)
- Spouse: Susana Oblefias
- Children: 2
- Education: De La Salle University (BS, MBA); Manuel L. Quezon University (LL.B)
- Occupation: Politician

Roberto "Obet" Mamangon Pagdanganan (born July 19, 1946) is a Filipino Politician who served as the 29th Governor of Bulacan from 1988 to 1998 and subsequently as Secretary of Tourism and Secretary of Agrarian Reform.

== Personal life ==
Roberto Pagdanganan was born to former councillor Juan T. Pagdanganan, Jr. and Rosalina Mamangon Pagdanganan. He is the brother of former Calumpit, Bulacan mayor Ramon Pagdanganan. He is married to the former Susana Oblefias of Sariaya, Quezon who is a governor of the Philippine National Red Cross and Central Board Member of the Girl Scouts of the Philippines. They have two children, Maria Rossana (married to Michael Allan Sicat) who is a former senior manager at Unilever PRC, who now has three children. They have a younger son Roberto Raymond. Roberto Raymond was also a politician, he ran for Vice-governor of Bulacan in 2004. Raymond died in 2007 in a car accident on the MacArthur Highway, in Malolos City, Bulacan.

== Career ==
=== Political career ===
Roberto "Obet" Pagdanganan, is the President of the Foundation for Local Autonomy and Good Governance, Inc. (FLAGG), an NGO dedicated to pursue equitable and sustainable national progress through genuine local autonomy, good governance and quality education. He is Chairman of the National Cooperative Movement (NCM) which supports the development of cooperatives and the small and medium enterprises (SMEs). He is also vice-chairman of the National Real Estate Association (NREA), and a member of the National Executive Board of the Boy Scouts of the Philippines (BSP) where he was a two-term National President in 1996 to 1998 and 2019 to the present. He holds two other posts in the government as presidential adviser on cooperatives and chairman of the board of part-time professor at the Manuel L. Quezon University (15 years) and Pamantasan ng Lungsod ng Maynila (3 years), before he became OIC Governor of Bulacan from March 1986 to December 1987. He was elected unopposed (the first) as Provincial Governor of Bulacan in January 1988 and was thereafter re-elected twice in 1992 and in 1995. In the latter election, Pagdanganan won against actor and comedian Bert "Tawa" Marcelo, who had the support of people from the entertainment industry such as Fernando Poe Jr. and Pilita Corrales.

In 1998, he ran as a candidate for the Presidential nomination of Lakas-CMD but later lost to House Speaker Jose de Venecia during the national convention, he was later included as one of the candidates of the party for the 1998 Senatorial Elections where he placed in the 13th spot. In 2001, he ran again as senator during the Midterm elections under the People Power Coalition but later lost.

Obet Pagdanganan also hosts regular radio programs: "Lingkod ng Bayan" at GMA Super Radyo DZBB, 594 kHz every Saturday, 11 am to noon; "Obet P. sa IZ" at DWIZ, 882 kHz every Saturday, 5 pm to 6 pm; "Yagyagan sa Bantay Radyo" at DYDD Cebu City, every Saturday, 9 pm to 10 pm; and "Obet n' Action sa Aksyon Radyo", DXGO Davao City every Sunday, 7 am to 8 am. He has published papers on Business and Local Government Partnership for National Progress, development of SME's and cooperatives, and local governance. He is the author of the book "A Call for Cooperative Revolution".

After Pagdanganan lost the 2007 Bulacan Gubernatorial race, his brother, Ramon "Monching," who also lost the Calumpit mayoralty race, was gunned down on May 4, 2008, in Calumpit. The Philippine National Police (PNP) ordered full security for Roberto Pagdanganan.

On October 15, 2009, the Supreme Court of the Philippines allowed the Commission on Elections to proceed with the election protest for the gubernatorial position in Bulacan of Roberto M. Pagdanganan against Joselito R. Mendoza.

On December 1, 2009, the Commission on Elections proclaimed Roberto Pagdanganan as the rightful governor of the province of Bulacan.

As a new member of the Nacionalista Party, Pagdanganan ran for congressman for the 1st district of Bulacan in the 2010 but lost to incumbent Ma. Victoria Sy-Alvarado.

In retirement, he and Wilhelmino Sy-Alvarado (husband of Ma. Victoria), as former governors of Bulacan, campaigned against the conversion of San Jose del Monte as a highly urbanized city in a 2024 plebiscite, intended to separate it from Bulacan's political and administrative control. The plebiscite failed.

=== Government positions ===
This is a partial list of government offices handled by Roberto Pagdanganan:

- Governor, Province of Bulacan, 1988–1998
- National President, League Of Provinces of the Philippines, 1990–1998
- National President, Boy Scouts of the Philippines, 1995–1997
- Secretary, Department of Agrarian Reform (Philippines) January 20, 2003 – January 20, 2004
- Secretary, Department of Tourism (Philippines) February 26 – August 31, 2004
- Chairman and President, Philippine International Trading Corporation, September 2004 - March 2007
- Chairman, Philippine Southeast Asian Games Organizing Committee (PhilSOC), 2004–2005

== Education ==
Obet Pagdanganan holds the following educational qualifications.

- Doctorate in educational management (honoris causa), Bulacan State University (1995);
- Bachelor of Laws, Manuel L. Quezon University (1990);
- Master of Business Administration, De La Salle University (1981);
- Bachelor of Science in chemical engineering (1968), where he is the only summa cum laude to date in the School of Engineering, 11th Placer, Chemical Engineering Board Examinations (July, 1968);
- Calumpit Institute (now Colegio de Calumpit Inc.), valedictorian (1963);
- Calumpit Elementary School (also Caniogan Elementary School), valedictorian (1959)

Pagdanganan was among the record 6,533 law graduates who took the September 2008 Philippine Bar Examination.

== In media ==
- Pagdanganan was cast as Deodato Arellano, the Supremo of the Katipunan, in the 1996 film Tirad Pass: The Last Stand of Gen. Gregorio del Pilar.
- His life story was made into a film in 1997 entitled Ilaban Mo, Bayan Ko: The Obet Pagdanganan Story starring Joel Torre.
