= Paombong =

Municipality in Bulacan, Philippines

- Municipality
- Municipality of Paombong
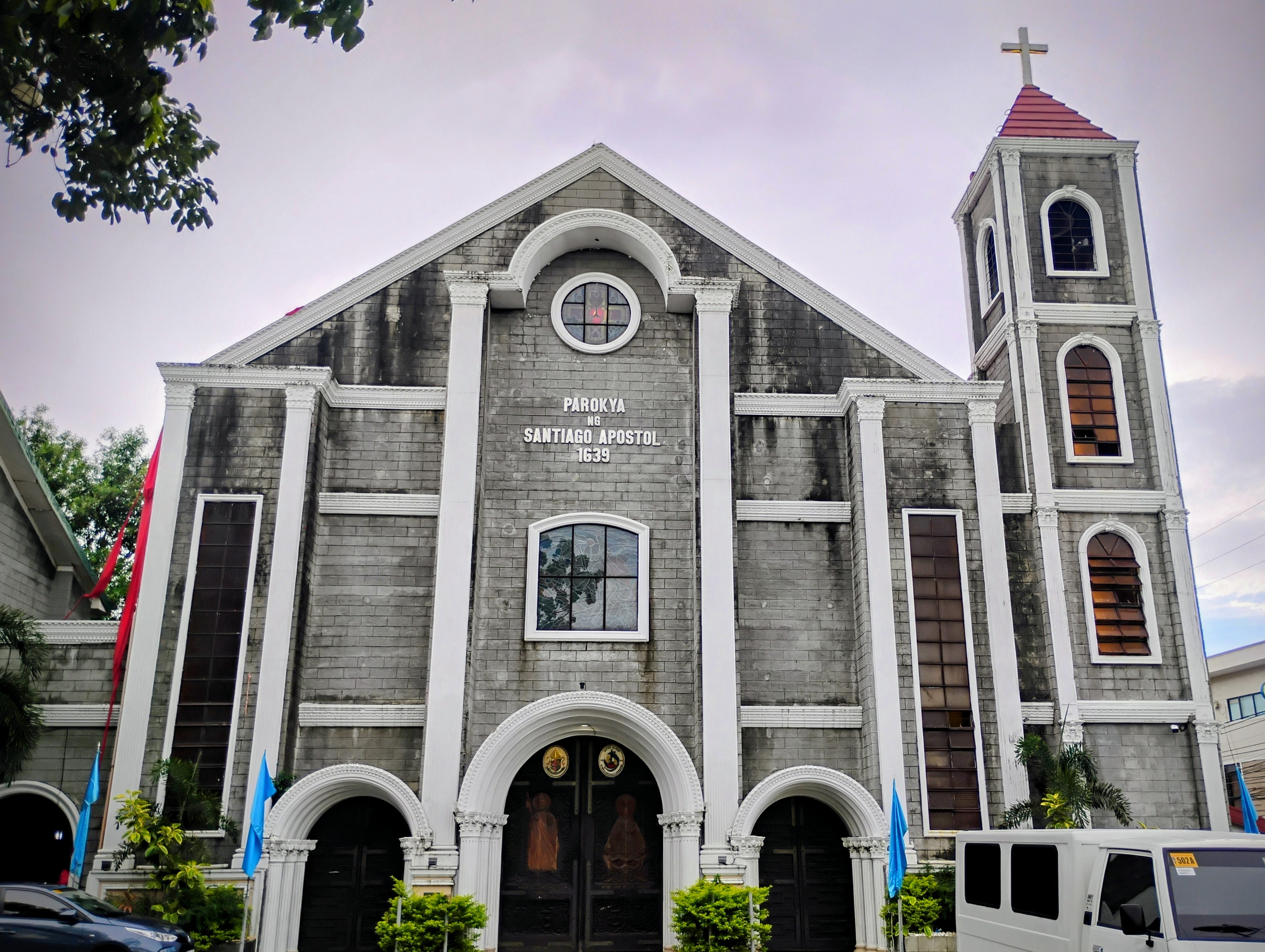
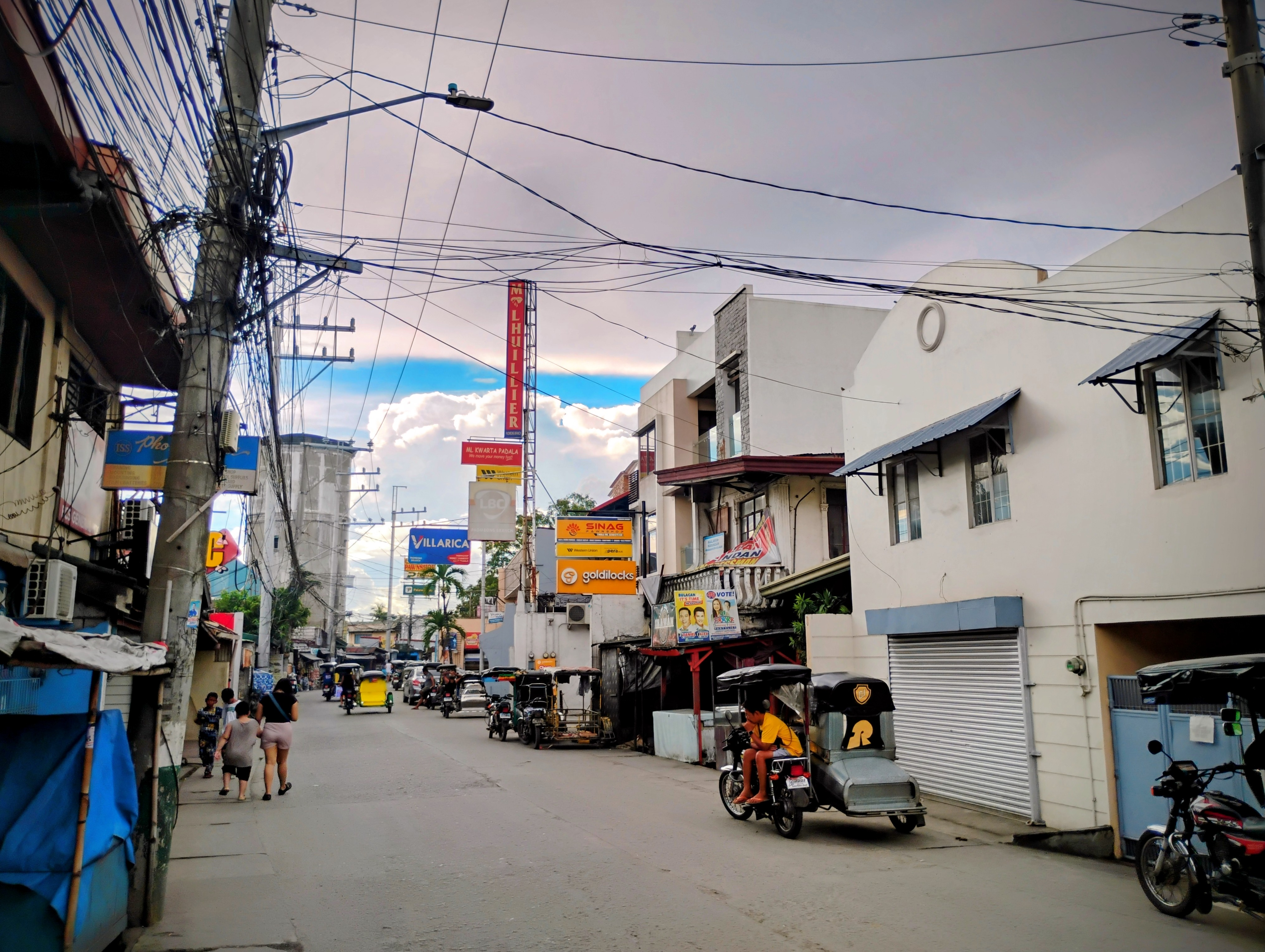
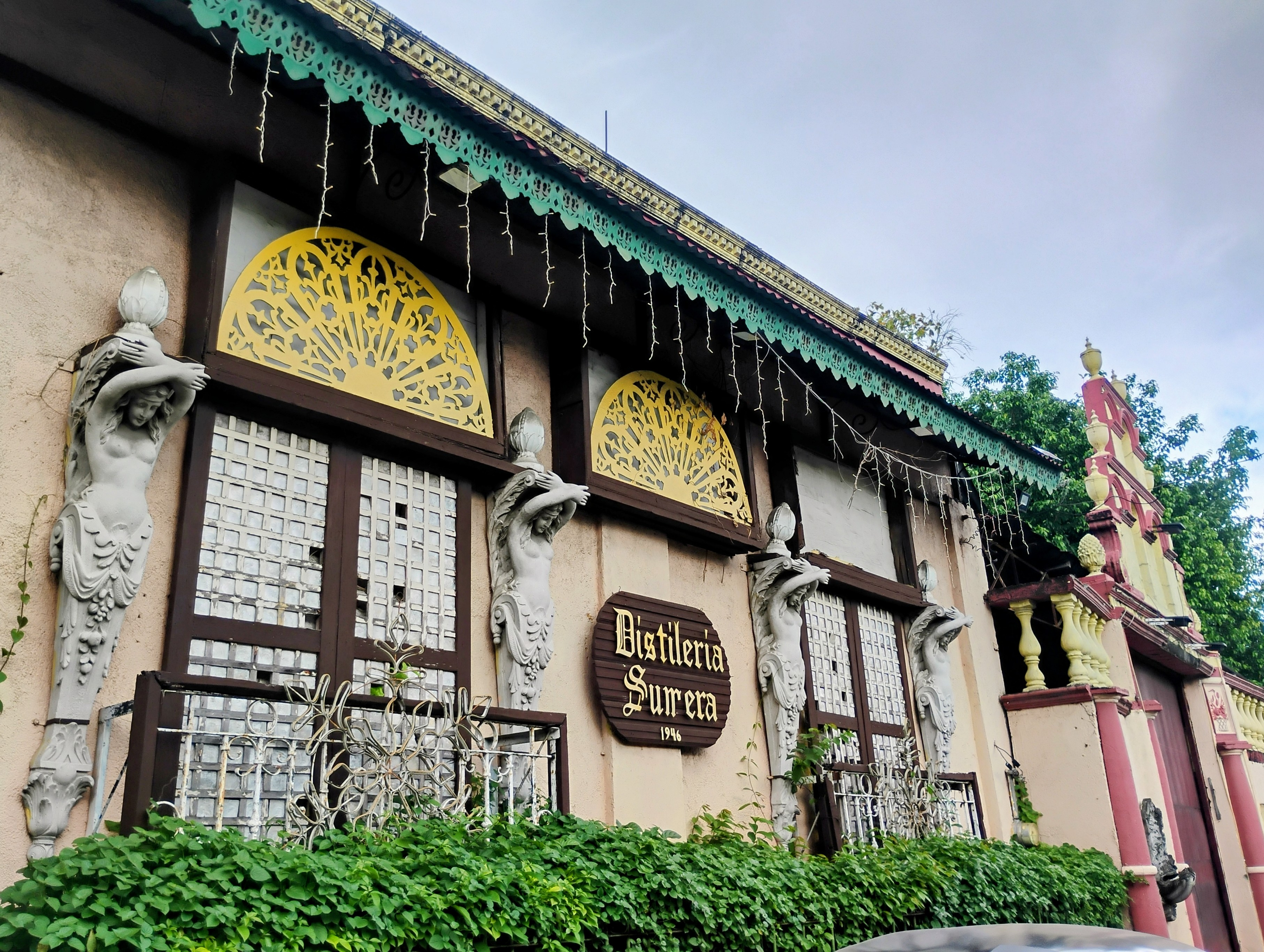
- Saint James the Greater Parish Church Paombong Town Proper Distileria Sumera

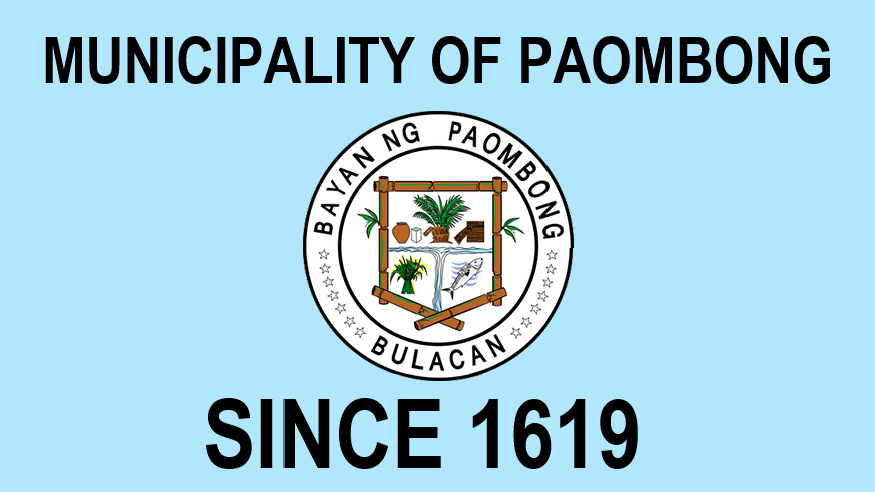
- Flag Seal
- Nickname: Vinegar Capital of the Philippines
- Motto: Abante Bagong Paombong Pantay Pantay na Karapatan sa Pag-asa sa Kaunlaran
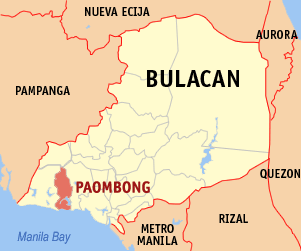
- Map of Bulacan with Paombong highlighted
- Interactive map of Paombong
- Location within the Philippines
- Coordinates: 14°49′52″N 120°47′21″E
- Country: Philippines
- Region: Central Luzon
- Province: Bulacan
- District: 1st district
- Founded: 1619
- Barangays: 14 (see Barangays)

Government
  - Type: Sangguniang Bayan
  - Mayor: Mac Marcos
  - Vice Mayor: JC Castro
  - Representative: Danilo A. Domingo
  - Municipal Council: Members: Alfredo B. Castro Jr.; John Raymond A. Marcaida; Paulo Mari S. de Jesus; Gian Carlo G. Valencia; Judith Z. Bartolome; Marcelo D. Ong III; Philip L. Eusebio; Marcelino R. de Roxas
  - Electorate: 38,237 voters (2025)

Area
  - Total: 46.34 km^{2} (17.89 sq mi)
- Elevation: 5.0 m (16.4 ft)
- Highest elevation: 26 m (85 ft)
- Lowest elevation: −5 m (−16 ft)

Population (2024 census)
  - Total: 58,453
  - Density: 1,261/km^{2} (3,267/sq mi)
  - Households: 14,187
- Demonym: Paombongenyo

Economy
  - Income class: 2nd municipal income class
  - Poverty incidence: 10.65% (2023)
  - Revenue: ₱ 217.9 million (2024)
  - Assets: ₱ 389.3 million (2024)
  - Expenditure: ₱ 237.9 million (2024)
  - Liabilities: ₱ 110.9 million (2024)

Utilities
  - Electricity: Meralco
- Time zone: UTC+8 (PST)
- ZIP code: 3001
- PSGC: 0301416000
- IDD : area code: +63 (0)44
- Native languages: Tagalog
- Catholic diocese: Malolos
- Patron saint: James the Greater

Paombong ([pɐʔomˈbɔŋ] or [ˈpoːmbɔŋ]), officially the Municipality of Paombong (Tagalog: Bayan ng Paombong), is a municipality in the province of Bulacan, Philippines. According to the 2024 census, it has a population of 58,453 people.

== Etymology ==
Legend has it that the name Paombong was taken from the Tagalog word bumbóng or tukil, a long bamboo tube used for collecting nipa sap. The practice of extracting nipa sap bumbóng made the town known as the "town with many bumbóng."

It is claimed that Spaniards who first visited the place were so amused with the bumbóng that, after learning its name from the natives, they named the town after the container, a name which later evolved to Paombong.

== History ==
=== Spanish colonial era ===
Paombong was originally one of the visitas (subsidiary missionary station) of Malolos, mentioned in Chapter XXXVI of Conquistas de Las Islas libro segundo by Fray Gaspar de San Agustín, OSA. In a meeting held in Tondo convento, the Provincial Chapter created the Town of Malolos in June 1580 with Fray Matheo de Mendoza, OSA as its first minister, together with barrios of Mambog under the patronage of Saint Roch, Matimbo under the Holy Cross, and Paombong under Saint James the Apostle. In 1619, Augustinians already established the Paombong convento but the town was administered by the justice of friars from Malolos. Paombong was not as wealthy as its neighbours Malolos and Hagonoy, and it did not sustain its township leading to its return to the status of barrio and being a visita in 1638.

In 1639, Paombong was turned over to the town of Calumpit from its mother town of Malolos and in 1649 it was returned again to Malolos. On November 28, 1650, it was finally given its own civil government, making Paombong a full township with Don Agustín Mananghaya as its first gobernadorcillo.

In the middle of the 1750s, Paombong grew into a modest community from what was once cogon-grown land inhabited by a handful of Tagalogs.

=== Revolutionary era ===
During the Philippine Revolution against the Spanish Empire, Paombong's coastal area, more specifically, Barangays Masukol and Binakod, played a significant role in Philippine history being known battlefields between Spanish soldiers and Katipuneros. Maloleño General Isidoro "Matanglawin" Torres used to retreat with his troops to Barangay Masukol and Barangay Binakod to avoid the advancing Spanish forces. In the latter village, he organized the Katipunan militia of Paombong.

It is from these skirmishes that Barangays Binakod and Masukol earned their present names. In one encounter, Binakod was where the enemies where "fenced in" (binakuran) and it was in Masukol where they were eventually "cornered" (nasukol) and defeated.

=== American colonial era ===
In 1898, the first civilian in the person of Don Victorio de León headed the Municipal Government until 1900. The seat of the local government was first established on the ground floor of Paombong Church’s clergy house, then popularly called the "zaguán". It was later transferred to the house of Numerino Lindayag located in Población, then was transferred to the location of the present Rural Health Center I. Eventually it was moved to the place where it is presently located which since has been the seat of the Municipal Government since then. In 1941, the head of the Municipal Government was later on called Municipal Mayor.

== Geography ==
Paombong is situated south-west of the province of Bulacan, with a total land area of 46.34 square kilometers (17.89 sq mi). It is bounded by the municipality of Calumpit to the north, Malolos to the east, municipality of Hagonoy to the west, and the Manila Bay to the south. The municipality is approximately 47 kilometers (29 mi) from Metro Manila, it is a by-pass town and can be accessed via North Luzon Expressway and MacArthur Highway.

=== Barangays ===
Paombong is politically subdivided into 14 barangays (6 urban, 8 rural). These barangays are headed by elected officials: Barangay Captain, Barangay Council, whose members are called Barangay Councilors. All are elected every three years. Each barangay consists of 7 puroks, while some have sitios.

- Binakod - a coastal barangay, it is known for producing rock salt.
- Kapitangan - this barangay is a famous pilgrimage site during Holy Week, particularly Good Friday. Some devout Catholic worshippers flagellate and/or allow themselves to be crucified as a means of penance and sharing in the sufferings of Jesus Christ.
- Malumot
- Masukol - a coastal barangay which was the site of skirmishes in the Philippine Revolution.
- Pinalagdan
- Poblacion - the heart of Paombong, containing the town hall and a parish complex.
- San Isidro I
- San Isidro II
- San Jose - hosting the town’s largest sasahan, it is subdivided into seven sitio or purók (Sitio Uno, Gitna, Sitio Tres, Sitio Wawa, Sitio Pantay, Sito Gunao and Sitio Kulis). It is also a political hotspot every election season, while the San Jose Fishport in Sitio Wawa harbours motorboats or bangkâ which are the chief water transport to the three barangays along Manila Bay: Santa Cruz, Masukol and Binakod.
- San Roque
- San Vicente
- Santa Cruz - The two main resources of this coastal barangay are the fishponds and asinan (salt flats)
- Santo Niño - Formerly known as "Tuláy na Bató" as it was once the only place with a concrete bridge. This is the frontier barangay of Paombong.
- Santo Rosario

=== Climate ===
Climate data for Paombong, Bulacan
Month	Jan	Feb	Mar	Apr	May	Jun	Jul	Aug	Sep	Oct	Nov	Dec	Year
Mean daily maximum °C (°F)	29 (84)	30 (86)	32 (90)	34 (93)	33 (91)	31 (88)	30 (86)	29 (84)	29 (84)	30 (86)	30 (86)	29 (84)	31 (87)
Mean daily minimum °C (°F)	20 (68)	20 (68)	21 (70)	23 (73)	24 (75)	25 (77)	24 (75)	24 (75)	24 (75)	23 (73)	22 (72)	21 (70)	23 (73)
Average precipitation mm (inches)	7 (0.3)	7 (0.3)	9 (0.4)	21 (0.8)	101 (4.0)	152 (6.0)	188 (7.4)	170 (6.7)	159 (6.3)	115 (4.5)	47 (1.9)	29 (1.1)	1,005 (39.7)
Average rainy days	3.3	3.5	11.1	8.1	18.9	23.5	26.4	25.5	24.5	19.6	10.4	6.4	181.2
Source: Meteoblue

== Demographics ==
Population census of Paombong
Year	Pop.	±% p.a.
1903	8,554	—
1918	9,260	+0.53%
1939	11,269	+0.94%
1948	13,437	+1.97%
1960	16,677	+1.82%
1970	20,636	+2.15%
1975	24,383	+3.40%
1980	26,267	+1.50%
1990	32,052	+2.01%
1995	33,149	+0.63%
2000	41,077	+4.70%
2007	50,798	+2.97%
2010	50,940	+0.10%
2015	53,294	+0.86%
2020	55,696	+0.93%
2024	58,453	+1.17%
Source: Philippine Statistics Authority

In the 2020 census, the population of Paombong, Bulacan, was 55,696 people, with a density of 1,200 inhabitants per square kilometre or 3,100 inhabitants per square mile.

== Economy ==
Poverty incidence of Paombong (%)

Source: Philippine Statistics Authority

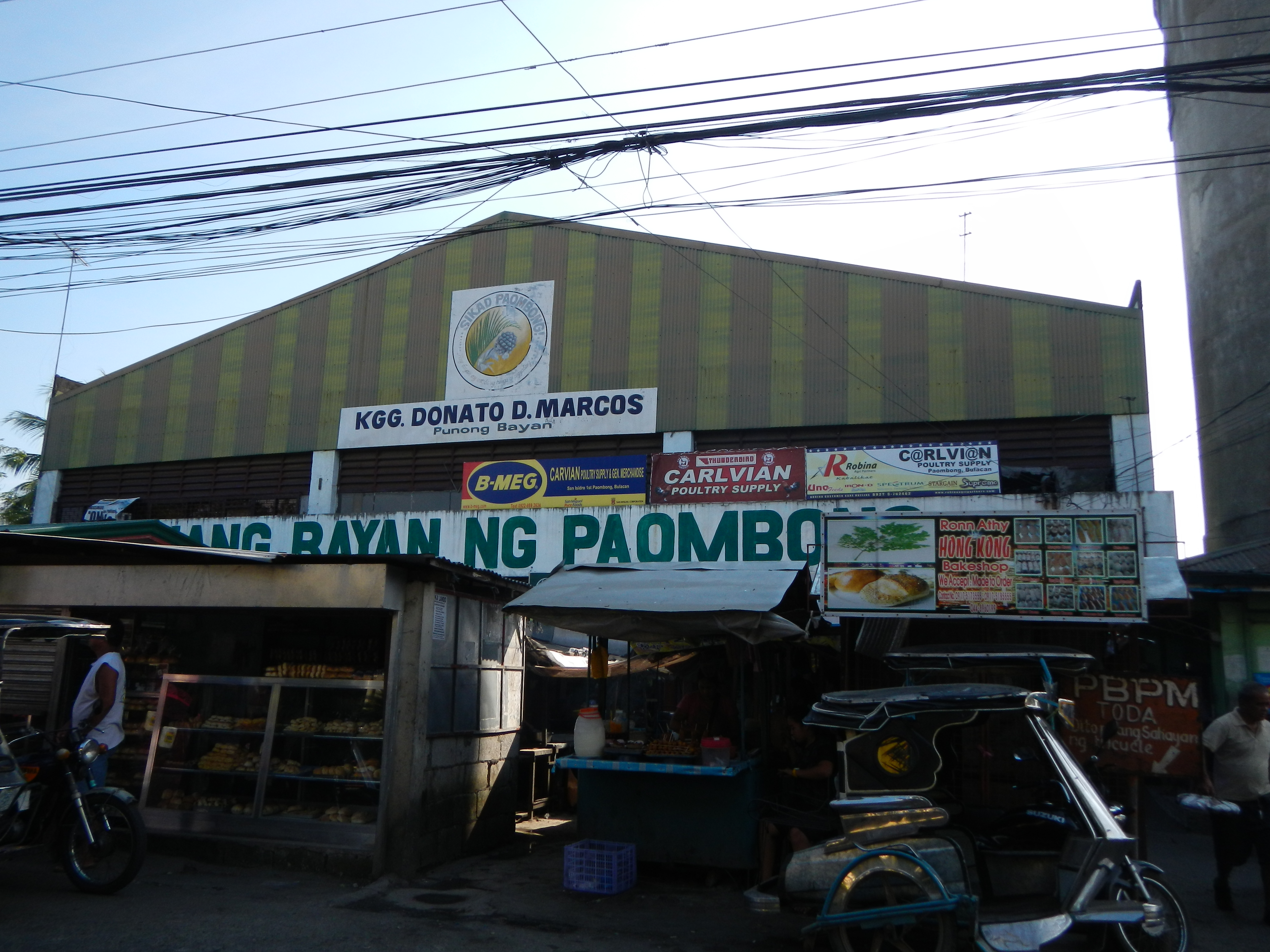
Public market

Major Industries

- Aquaculture (Culturing of Milk Fish, Tilapia, Shrimps, Oysters, King Crab & others)
- Ornamental Plants/Flowers (Used for gardening and landscaping)
- Grass Planting (Carabao Grass, Bermuda Grass, Blue Grass etc. - Used for Gardening & Landscaping)
- Garments
- Food Processing (Smoked Fish and other food products)

Major Products

- Condiments (Vinegar, Fish Sauce, Salts, et al.)
- Nipa (Weaving of Nipa Palm Leaves)
- Agricultural Products (Rice, Poultry, Livestocks, Fisheries, Fruits and Vegetables)

== Tourism ==
- St. James the Apostle Parish Church: The town church was originally built as visita of Malolos in 1580, and established as parish in 1639 made of light materials. A massive fire destroyed the original architecture, so it was reconstructed in the 1970s and again in 2003.
- Ciudad Clementino, the prime resort of the small town, was the venue of Sa Sandaling Kailangan Mo Ako miniseries but permanently closed.
- Kapitangan Good Friday Crucifixion: a local highlight every Good Friday are the crucifixions at Barangay Kapitangan. It is known as a pilgrimage area, spiritual healers' haven and venue of reenactments of the passion and death of Jesus, all done by local devotees and penitents.

== Transportation ==
Public land transport in Paombong is served by provincial buses, Jeepneys, for-hire Tricycles, Pedicabs, and UV Express AUVs. Maritime transport is served by motorboats. Both First North Luzon Transit and Baliwag Transit buses pass through the municipality.

== Healthcare ==
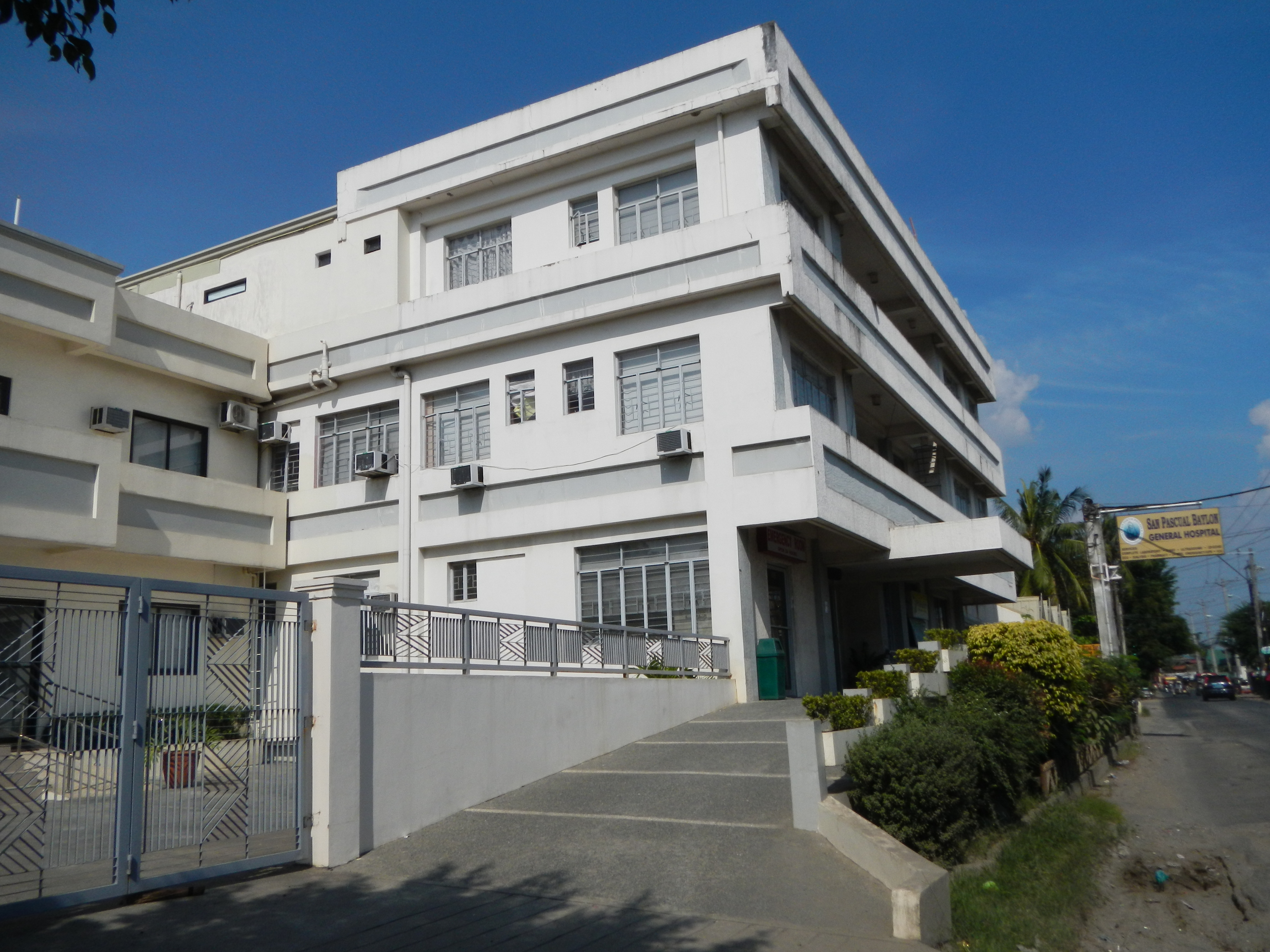
San Pascual Baylon Hospital

There is one hospital operating in Paombong and a main rural health care center unit. The San Pascual Baylon Maternity Hospital, situated at Barangay Santo Niño that offers secondary healthcare services. And the main rural health care center is one of the district rural health center owned and controlled by the Provincial Government of Bulacan. It offers primary healthcare services which also includes laboratory and dental and maternity services.

== Government ==
=== Local government ===
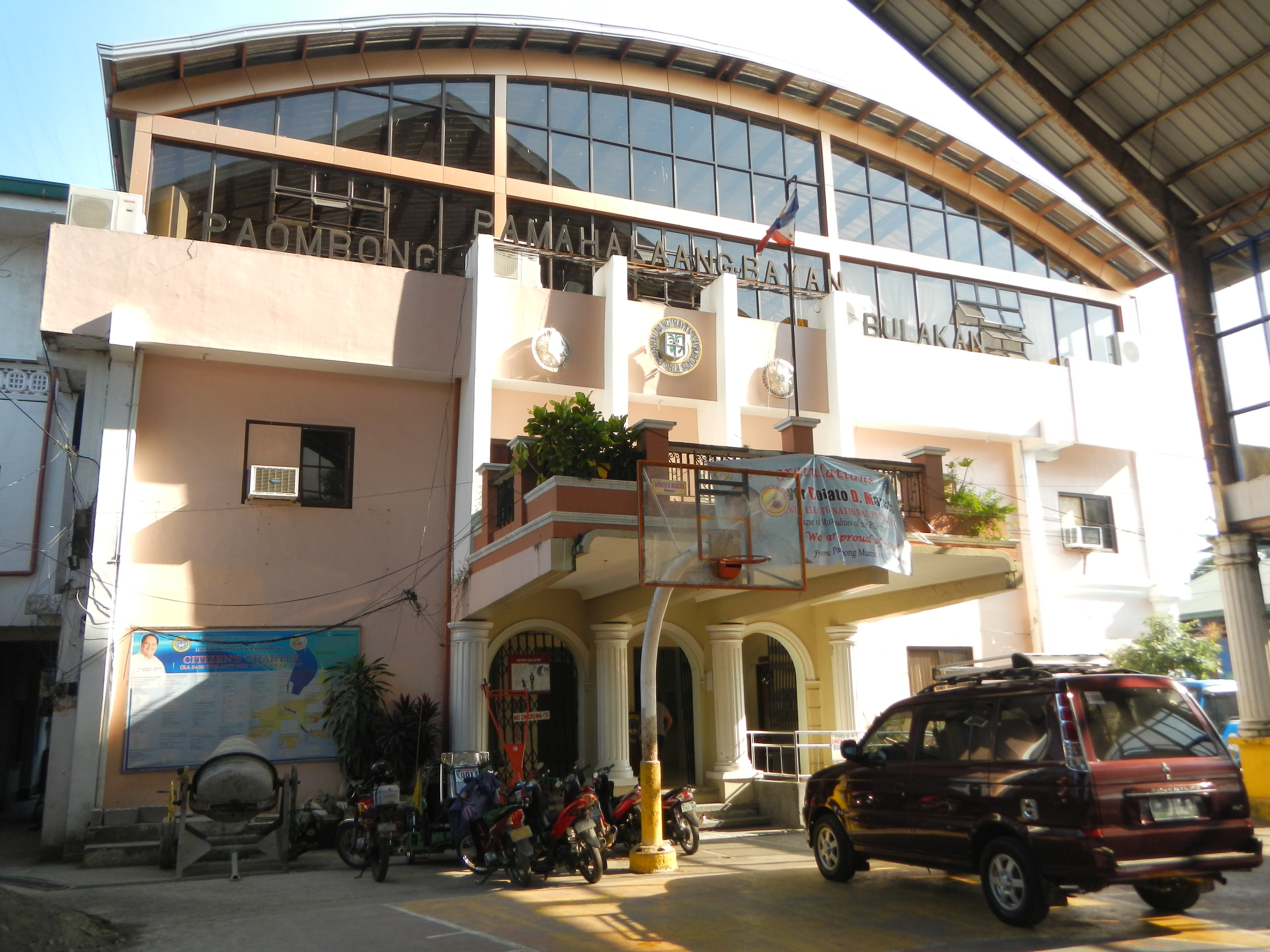
Town hall

Just as the national government, the municipal government is divided into three branches: executive, legislative and judiciary. The judicial branch is administered solely by the Supreme Court of the Philippines. The LGUs have control of the executive and legislative branch.

The executive branch is composed of the mayor and the barangay captain for the barangays. The legislative branch is composed of the Sangguniang Bayan (town assembly), Sangguniang Barangay (barangay council), and the Sangguniang Kabataan for the youth sector.

The seat of Government is vested upon the Mayor and other elected officers who hold office at the Town hall. The Sanguniang Bayan is the center of legislation.

=== Elected officials ===
The following officials were elected on May 9, 2022, to serve a three-year term.

- Mayor: Maryanne "Ann" P. Marcos (PDP-Laban)
- Vice Mayor: Emelita B. Yunson (PFP)

Councilors

- Alfredo "JC" B. Castro Jr. (PFP)
- John Raymond A. Marcaida (Lakas-CMD)
- Paulo Mari "Pao" S. de Jesus (PFP)
- Gian Carlo G. Valencia (NUP)
- Judith Z. Bartolome (NUP)
- Marcelo "Marcy" D. Ong III (NUP)
- Philip L. Eusebio (NUP)
- Marcelino "Marcing" R. de Roxas (Lakas-CMD)

== Education ==
The Paombong Schools District Office governs all educational institutions within the municipality. It oversees the management and operations of all private and public, from primary to secondary schools.

=== Primary and elementary schools ===
- Binakod Elementary School
- Binuya's Kiddie School
- Holy Rosary School of Paombong
- Kapitangan Elementary School
- Lantad Elementary School
- Masukol Elementary School
- Paombong Central School
- Pinagtulayan Elementary School
- Pinalagdan Elementary School
- Pulo Elementary School
- San Jose Elementary School
- St. Martin de Porres Catholic School
- Sta. Cruz Elementary School
- Sto. Niño Elementary School
- Sto. Rosario Elementary School

=== Secondary schools ===
- Kapitangan National High School
- Paombong High School
- Pinalagdan High School
- San Roque National High School
- Sta. Cruz National High School

== Gallery ==
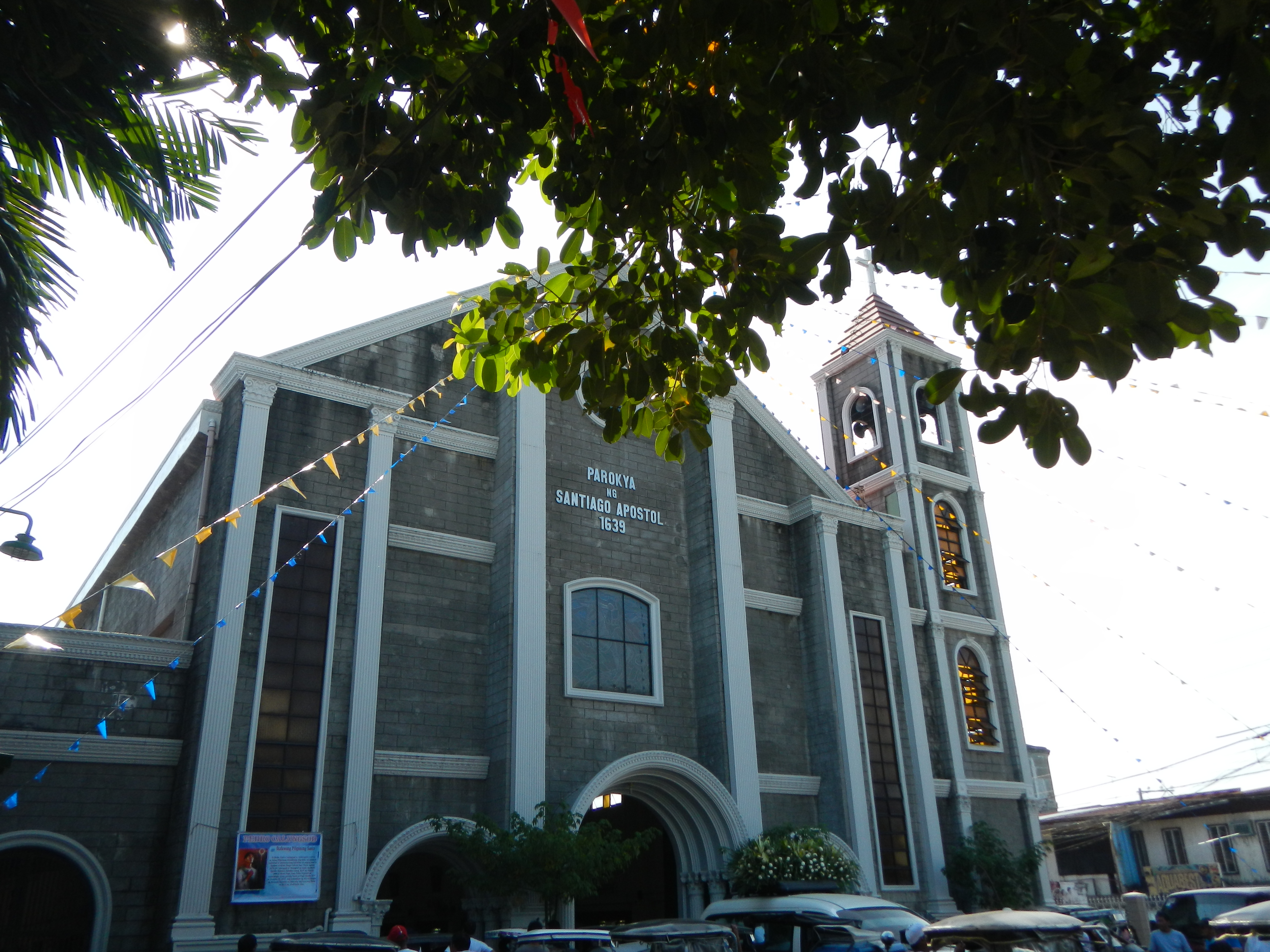
St. James the Apostle Parish Church

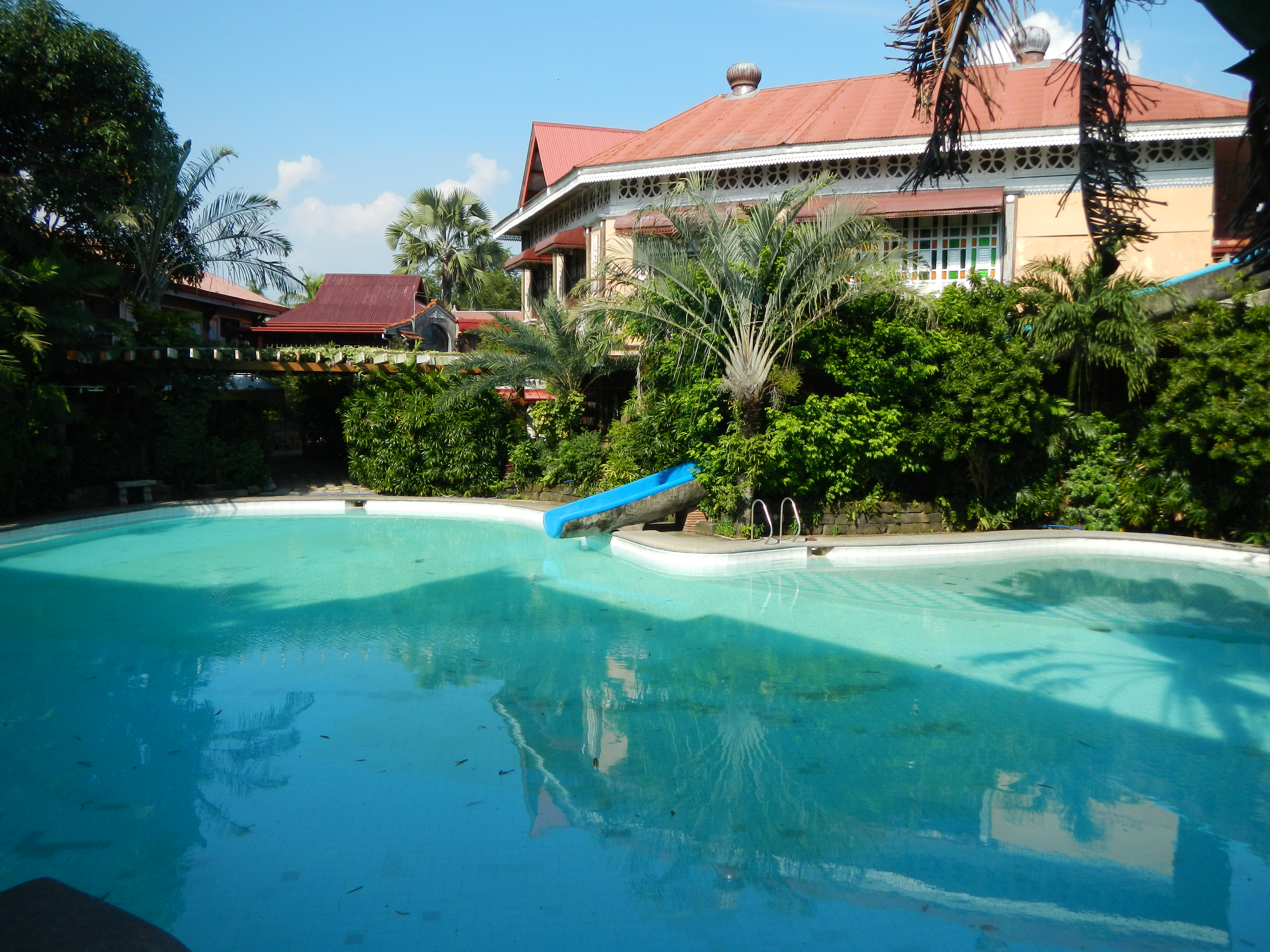
Ciudad Clementino, main pool

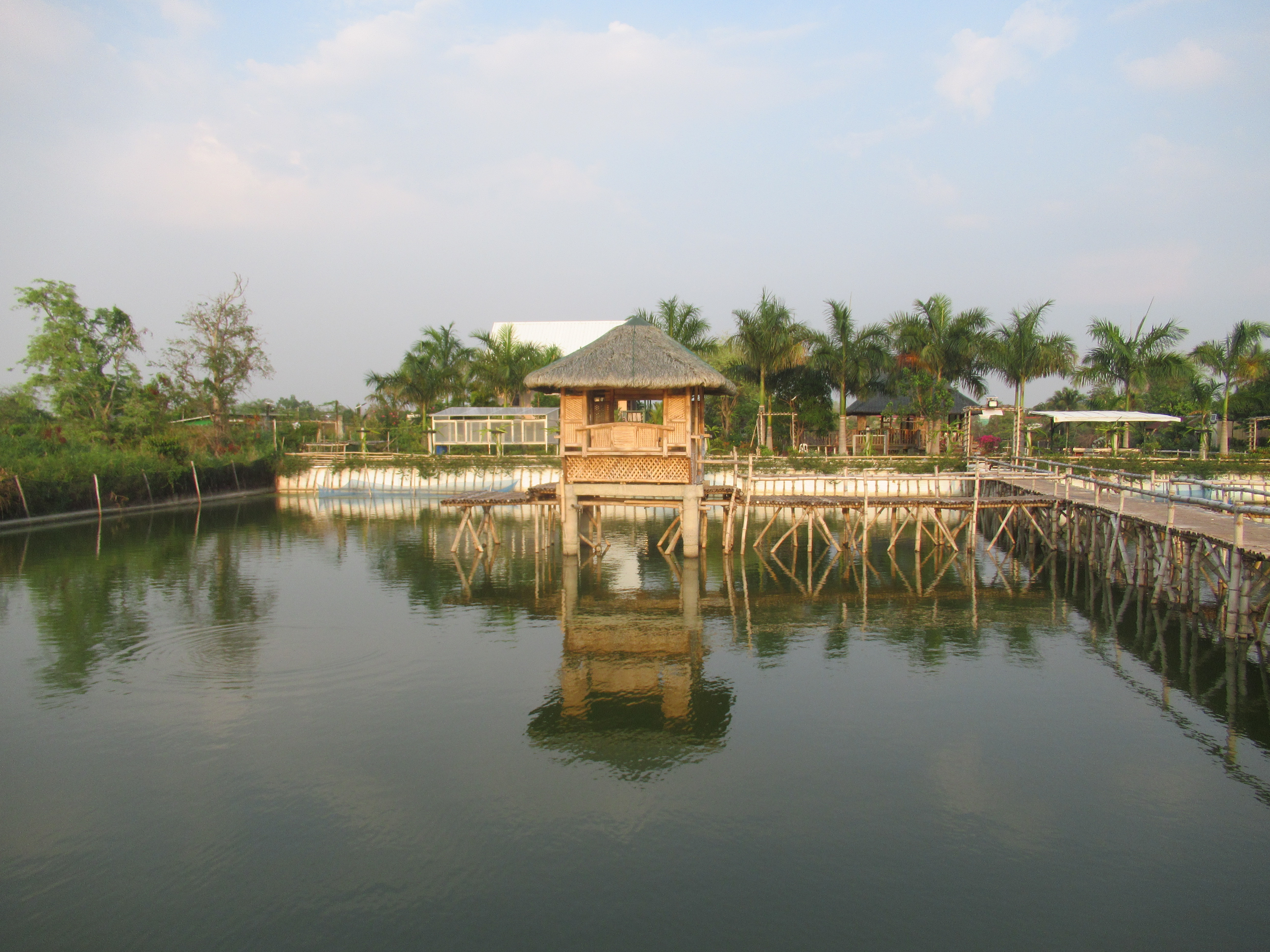
Mang Danny's Organic & Natural Farm, Sitio Sapang Camachile, Santo Rosario

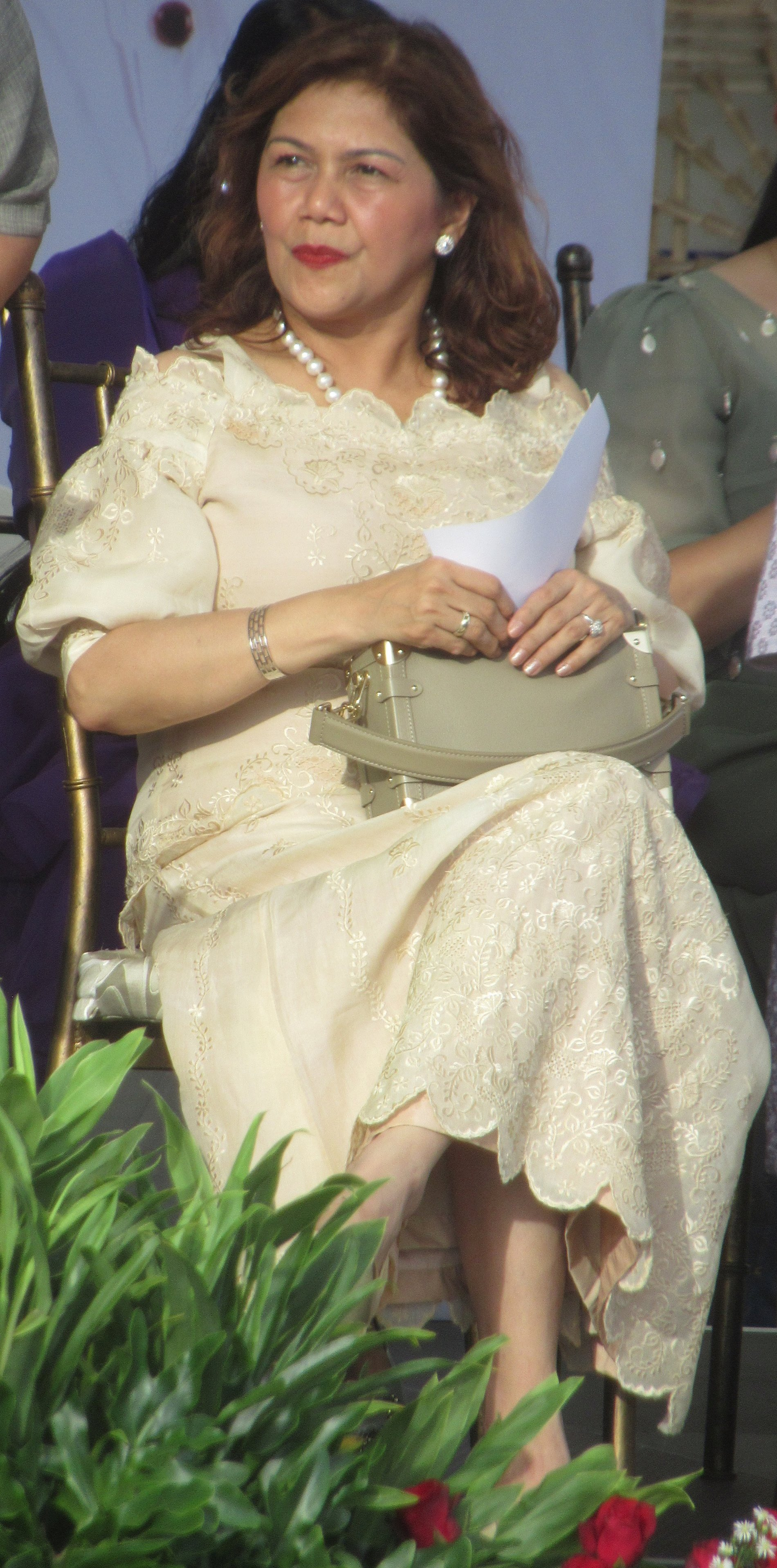
Mayor Maryanne Panganiban Marcos

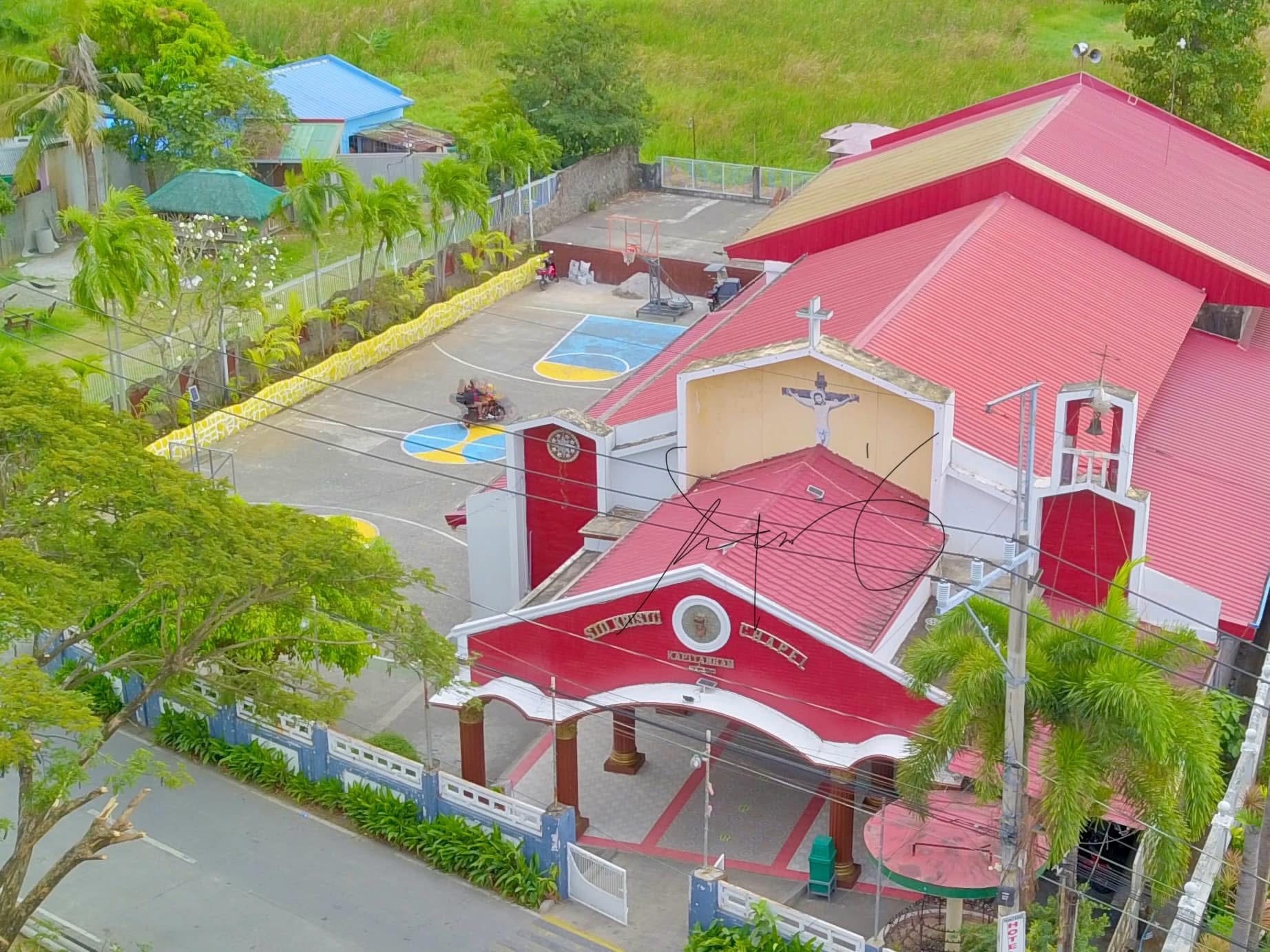
Sto Kristo Chapel Barangay Kapitangan
