= 2019 San Miguel, Bulacan, local elections =

Philippine election

2019 San Miguel, Bulacan mayoral election
← 2016	May 13, 2019	2022 →
Nominee	Roderick Tiongson	Ivy Mendez-Coronel	Jiboy Cabochan
Party	UNA	NUP	PDP–Laban
Running mate	Miguelito Dela Cruz	Mimio Dizon	Bong Alvarez
Popular vote	29,883	27,534	17,746
Percentage	39.75	36.63	23.61
Mayor before election
Ivy Mendez-Coronel
Liberal
Elected mayor
Roderick Tiongson
UNA

Local elections were held in San Miguel, Bulacan on May 13, 2019 within the Philippine general election. The voters will elect candidates for the elective local posts in the municipality: the mayor, vice mayor, and eight councilors.

== Background ==
List of certified candidates running for seats in San Miguel.

Incumbent Mayor Marivee "Ivy" M. Coronel is running for reelection as Mayor under the National Unity Party (Philippines). Her opponent are Jiboy Cabochan, 2007 Mayoralty aspirant he is running under the Partido Demokratiko Pilipino-Lakas ng Bayan and former mayor Roderick DG. Tiongson running under the United Nationalist Alliance.

== Results ==
=== Mayor ===
San Miguel, Bulacan Mayoralty Election
Party	Candidate	Votes	%
UNA	Roderick Tiongson	29,883	39.75
NUP	Ivy Mendez-Coronel	27,534	36.63
PDP–Laban	Jose Francisco Cabochan	17,746	23.61
Total votes		75,163	100.00
UNA gain from NUP			

=== Vice Mayor ===
San Miguel, Bulacan Vice Mayoralty Election
Party	Candidate	Votes	%
PDP–Laban	Bong Alvarez	37,953	54.20
NUP	Mimio Dizon	24,916	35.58
UNA	Miguelito Dela Cruz	7,146	10.20
Total votes		70,015	100.00
PDP–Laban hold			

=== Sangguniang Bayan ===
San Miguel, Bulacan Sangguniang Bayan election
Party	Candidate	Votes	%
PDP–Laban	Bunso Beltran	33,085	7.21
NUP	Kap Melvin Santos	32,437	7.07
PDP–Laban	Jhong Reyes	29,440	6.42
PDP–Laban	Emil Magtalas	28,967	6.31
PDP–Laban	Richie Dela Cruz	28,772	6.27
NUP	Jayvee Lacsina	22,584	4.92
NUP	Mark David Maon	21,109	4.60
NUP	Nika Santiago-Tan	20,337	4.43
NUP	Tony Macasu	18,862	4.11
PDP–Laban	Egoy Calderon	17,918	3.90
UNA	OJ Andres	17,448	3.80
PDP–Laban	Myca Bonoan	17,054	3.72
NUP	Terence Rivera	16,668	3.63
Independent	Pop Buencamino	16,439	3.58
NUP	CJ Cayetano-Ballesteros	16,075	3.50
UNA	Charlie Viudez	16,067	3.50
UNA	Excelite Reyes	14,746	3.21
UNA	Bayani Tecson	12,882	2.81
UNA	Brian Pascual	12,651	2.75
UNA	Raymond Francis Santos	10,945	2.38
Independent	Jeffrey Violago	10,755	2.34
PDP–Laban	Avie Pagala	10,341	2.25
UNA	Aspog Astley Apolinario	9,423	2.05
PDP–Laban	Ervin Timoteo	8,217	1.79
UNA	Albert Silva	7,598	1.65
NUP	SK Lovely Francisco	7,575	1.65
Total votes		458,395	100.00
