= Luz Ocampo =

Filipino artisan (1922–2016)

- Born: Luz Villaseñor Mendoza; August 6, 1922; San Miguel de Mayumo, Bulacan, Philippine Islands
- Died: February 21, 2016 (aged 93); Malolos, Bulacan, Philippines
- Known for: Pabalat making
- Spouse: Oscar Ocampo (died 1970s)
- Children: 4
- Patrons: Department of Tourism

Luz "Nene" Villaseñor Mendoza-Ocampo (August 6, 1922 – February 21, 2016) was a Filipino papercutting artisan known for promoting the Bulacan craft of making pabalat, an intricate wrapper for pastillas.

== Early life ==
Ocampo was born on August 6, 1922, in San Miguel de Mayumo in Bulacan as the only daughter Isidro Mendoza of San Isidro, Nueva Ecija, and San Miguel local Adelaida Payawal Villaseñor from the village of San Vicente.

Her hometown of San Miguel is known for producing pastillas, a type of carabao milk candy. Her mother, Adelaida is a pastry maker from the village of San Vicente known for her pastillas and other food products.

She attended the San Miguel Elementary School before entering the Biak-na-Bato High School. However, World War II broke out when she was a fourth year highschooler and did not pursue college studies.

== Career ==
=== Learning pabalat ===
Luz Ocampo learned about the art of making traditional pastillas wrappers or pabalat when she was a fifth grader sometime in 1934. She honed her craft by helping her mother in cutting wrappers during her spare time outside school.

=== Style ===
Her pabalat design is associated with the San Miguel method which is more intricated compared to the Malolos variant. Ocampo created more than 50 designs, inspired from rural elements of her hometown of San Miguel. 25 designs are patented. She uses Japanese paper for pabalat due to its softness and thinness.

=== Pabalat as livelihood ===
After World War II, Ocampo set up a gift shop in San Miguel. Upon marriage, she began taking pabalat orders from her residence. After she became a widow in the 1970s, she committed to making pabalat as a means to support her family. Ocampo moved to Malolos to live with her daughter in 1993.

In 1994, Ocampo reportedly is able to produce 102 individual pabalat wrappers per day. Ocampo names the Department of Tourism and high-end hotels as her frequent customers. She held demonstrations of the craft at the University of the Philippines and Miriam College and various high schools in Bulacan.

She retired as a pabalat maker in 2010 at age 88.

== Personal life ==
Luz was married to an Oscar Ocampo with whom she had four children. Her husband died in the 1970s. Her daughter Naty Ocampo-Castro, took up the papercutting craft in 2010.

== Death and legacy ==
Ocampo died in her residence in Barangay Caniogan in Malolos on February 21, 2016, at age 93 due to a lingering illness. She is recognized for preserving the tradition of pabalat making by the local governments of the province of Bulacan and towns of Malolos and San Miguel since 2000. In September 2015, the Bulacan government gave her the Dangal ng Lipi award for excelling in her field. The National Historical Commission of the Philippines gave her the Gawad Pamanang Sining.
