= 2022 San Miguel, Bulacan local elections =

2022 San Miguel, Bulacan mayoral election
- May 9, 2022
- Registered: 100,163
- Turnout: 87.78%
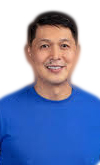

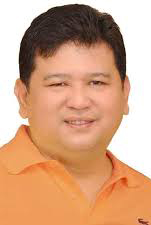
Nominee	Pop Buencamino	Kuya Jiboy Cabochan	Mona Labitoria-Visperas
Party	KBL	Aksyon	Independent
Popular vote	942	31,762	275
Percentage	1.07	36.12	0.31
Nominee	Roderick "Erick" Tiongson
Party	NUP
Running mate	John "Bong" Alvarez
Popular vote	51,453
Percentage	58.52
Mayor before election
Roderick Tiongson
NUP
Elected mayor
Roderick Tiongson
NUP

Local elections was held in San Miguel, Bulacan on May 9, 2022, within the Philippine general election. The voters will elect candidates for the elective local posts in the municipality: the mayor, vice mayor, and eight councilors.

== Background ==
After winning the mayoral race in 2019, Roderick "Erick" Tiongson sought re-election in the 2022 national elections. He ran under the NUP. His main challenger was former mayor Edmundo Jose "Pop" Buencamino, who previously served as mayor of San Miguel but was unable to finish his term due to a case filed with the Ombudsman. Although he was initially found guilty, the decision was later overturned by the Supreme Court.

Also joining the mayoral race were Atty. Jiboy Cabochan, running for the fifth time under Aksyon Demokratiko, and independent candidate Mona Labitoria-Visperas, a known advocate for persons with disabilities.

== Results ==
=== Mayor ===
Incumbent Mayor Roderick "Erick" Tiongson was re-elected, securing 51,453 votes. His closest competitor, Atty. Jiboy Cabochan of Aksyon Demokratiko, received 31,762 votes. Former mayor Edmundo Jose "Pop" Buencamino, running under the Kilusang Bagong Lipunan (KBL), garnered 942 votes, while independent candidate Mona Labitoria-Visperas obtained 275 votes.

San Miguel, Bulacan Mayoralty Election
Party	Candidate	Votes	%
NUP	Roderick "Erick" De Guzman Tiongson	51,453	58.52
Aksyon	Jose Francisco "Kuya Jiboy" Santos Cabochan	31,762	36.12
KBL	Edmundo Jose "Pop" Tecson Buencamino	942	1.07
Independent	Mona Liza "Mona" Jacinto Labitoria - Visperas	275	0.31
Total votes		87,920	100
NUP hold			

=== Vice Mayor ===
San Miguel, Bulacan Vice Mayoralty Election
Party	Candidate	Votes	%
NUP	John "Bong" Angeles Alvarez	42,887	48.78
RP	Melvin "KapKonsi" Bautista Santos	34,223	38.93
Total votes		87,920	100
NUP hold			

== Sangguniang Bayan ==
San Miguel, Bulacan Sangguniang Bayan election
Party	Candidate	Votes	%
NUP	REYES, GEROME DE CASTRO	45,704	9.02%
Reform PH–People's Party	DIZON, ROMEO CAYETANO	40,565	8.01%
Reform PH–People's Party	CHICO, MARY JOY ANN SALIMBAO	40,435	7.98%
NUP	MAGTALAS, EMMANUEL DELA CRUZ	38,618	7.62%
NUP	SANTIAGO-TAN, ANIKA CORINNE DELOS SANTOS	37,710	7.44%
Reform PH–People's Party	DE GUZMAN, JOSEPH NOEL PEREZ	36,741	7.25%
NUP	MAON, MARK DAVID CABUHAT	36,471	7.20%
NUP	DELA CRUZ, RICHARD PELAYO	35,847	7.07%
NUP	LACSINA, JAYVEE CAPUYON	35,791	7.06%
NUP	MENDEZ, JOHN HONGYONGCO	33,410	6.59%
NUP	VIUDEZ, CHARLIE HERRERA	33,405	6.59%
Independent	LOPEZ, GLEN HERBERT GARCIA	30,928	6.10%
Nacionalista Party (Philippines)	CALDERON, RAYMOND SANTOS	27,970	5.52%
Independent	PACULBA, MARY TEMPLE BLAIZE GABUTERO	3,245	0.64%
Total votes		703,360	100
