= Pabalat =

External videos
- Video on pabalat in Bulacan

An assortment of pabalat.

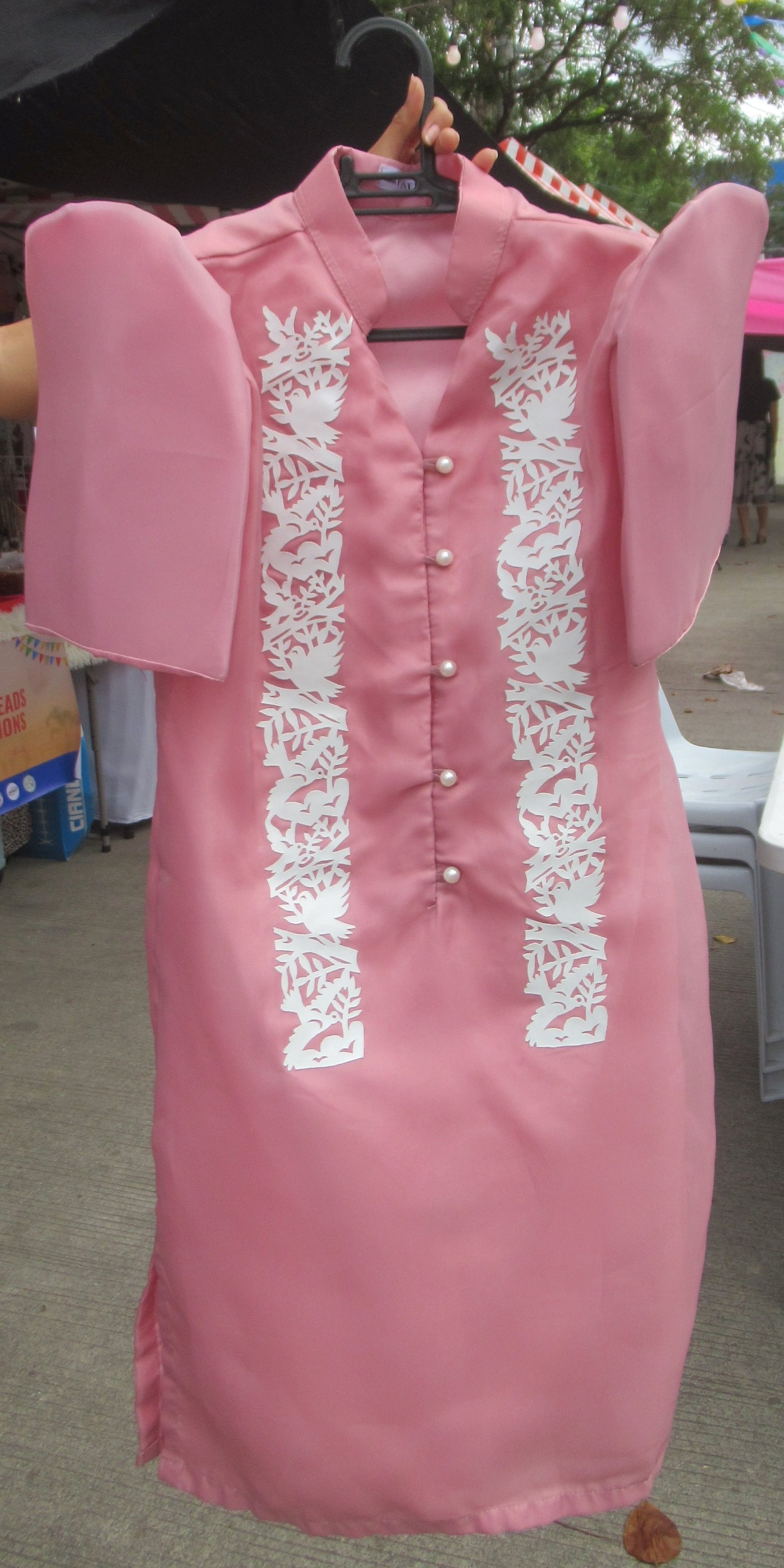
Malolos pabalat on a Baro't saya .

Pabalat, or borlas de pastillas, is a form of papercutting originating in the province of Bulacan in the Philippines.

== Background ==
The name of the craft is pabalat which is derived from the Tagalog word for skin ('balat') or borlas de pastillas (lit. 'tassels of pastillas').

The creation of pabalat involves making intricate papercut designs from wrappers used in pastillas and laminated as bookmarks, and usually made from papel de japon (Japanese paper).

Pabalat has been primarily associated with the town of San Miguel, Bulacan although there is a lack of documentation on when the craft began to be practiced in the town. It is noted to be already popular in the town in the 1900s as a fixture in fiestas. According to Luz Ocampo, the art form may have "probably" been from China.

== Tradition per town ==
There are variations in pabalat making in Bulacan. In San Miguel, a stencil is used in tracing a pattern on the paper for pabalat-making, while in Malolos, a stencil is not used, preferring to create the design in a "free-form" and impromptu fashion.

== Notable artisans ==
Among the well-known practitioners of the craft are San Miguel residents Luz Ocampo and her daughter, Naty Ocampo-Castro.
