= Pastillas =

Philippine milk-based confectionery

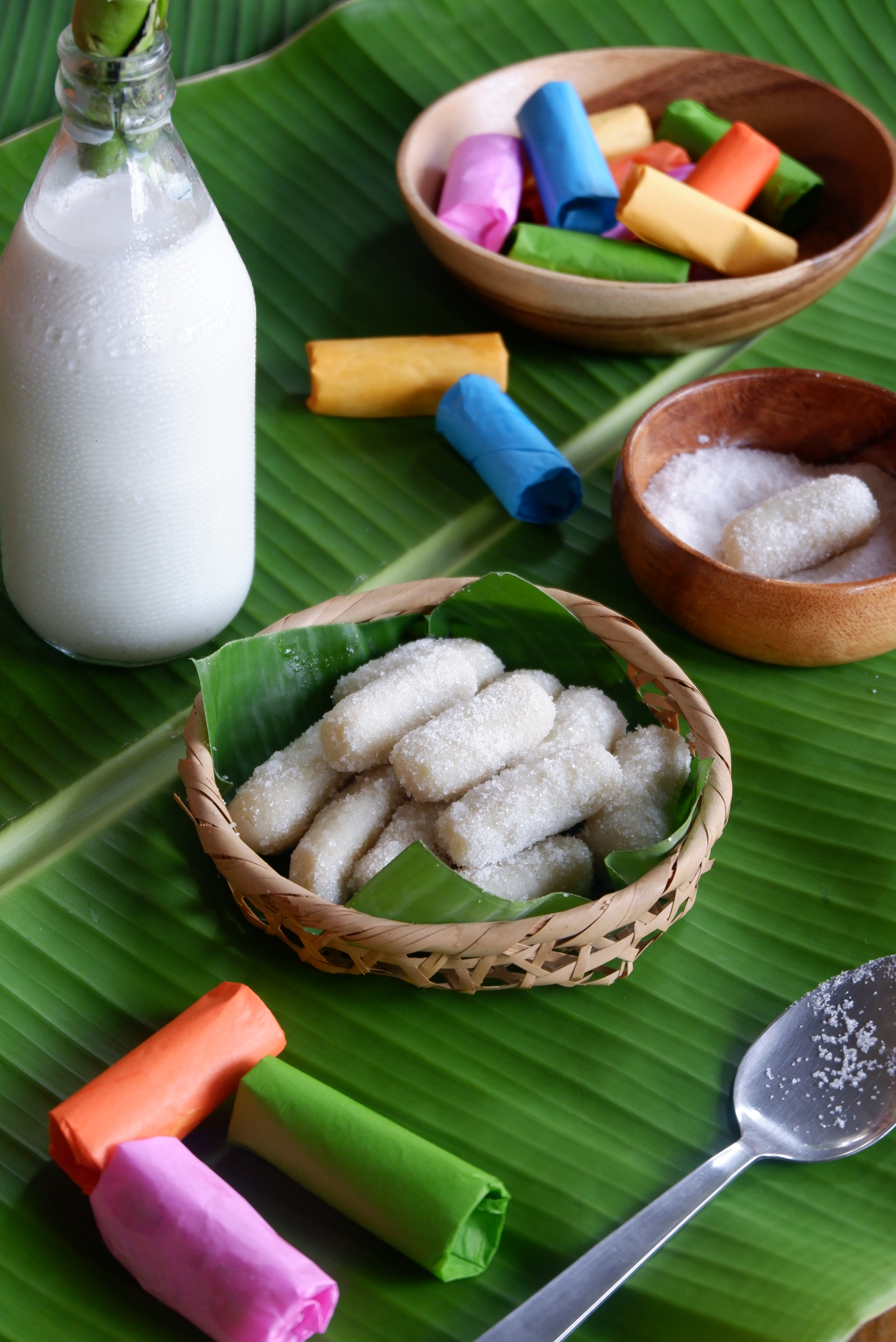
- Traditional pastillas made from carabao's milk
- Type: Sweets
- Place of origin: Philippines
- Region or state: San Miguel, Bulacan, San Pedro, Laguna
- Main ingredients: Carabao or cow milk
- Variations: Yema

Pastillas, also known as pastillas de leche (literally "milk pills"), refer to a type of milk-based confections that originated in the town of San Miguel in Bulacan, Philippines. From San Miguel, pastillas-making spread to other Philippine provinces such as Cagayan and Masbate.

== Description ==
Initially, pastillas de leche were primarily home-made by carabao-rearing farmers. A small-scale industry on the food product soon grew, with the pastillas made from either carabao or cow milk or both. Refined sugar and calamansi juice are also added during the pastillas-making process.

In San Miguel, Bulacan, a Pastillas Festival has been celebrated every May since 2006. The pabalat tradition is also included in the festival, which involves the display of elaborate paper-cut designs using the pastillas' wrapper material.

== Variants ==
There are three main categories of pastillas based on consistency: soft pastillas, hard pastillas, and toasted pastillas. Soft pastillas has a soft creamy texture. Hard pastillas is a denser version that crumbles when eaten. Toasted pastillas is lightly baked in an oven so that the exterior is browned - giving it the texture of hard pastillas on the outside and soft pastillas on the inside. Another category is the filled pastillas, which are basically just pastillas with a different-flavored filling.

Pastillas has numerous variants based on the ingredients used. One of the most common variants is the pastillas de yema (also called yema pastillas or pastiyema). It is a type of filled pastillas with a filling of yema, a very sweet traditional Filipino custard confectionary.

Other variants also use other flavors and ingredients, like pastillas de mani (peanuts), pastillas de pili (pili nuts), pastillas de ube (purple yam), pastillas de mangga (mango), and so on. In the Davao region of southern Mindanao, a popular variant is the pastillas de durian (also called "durian candy").

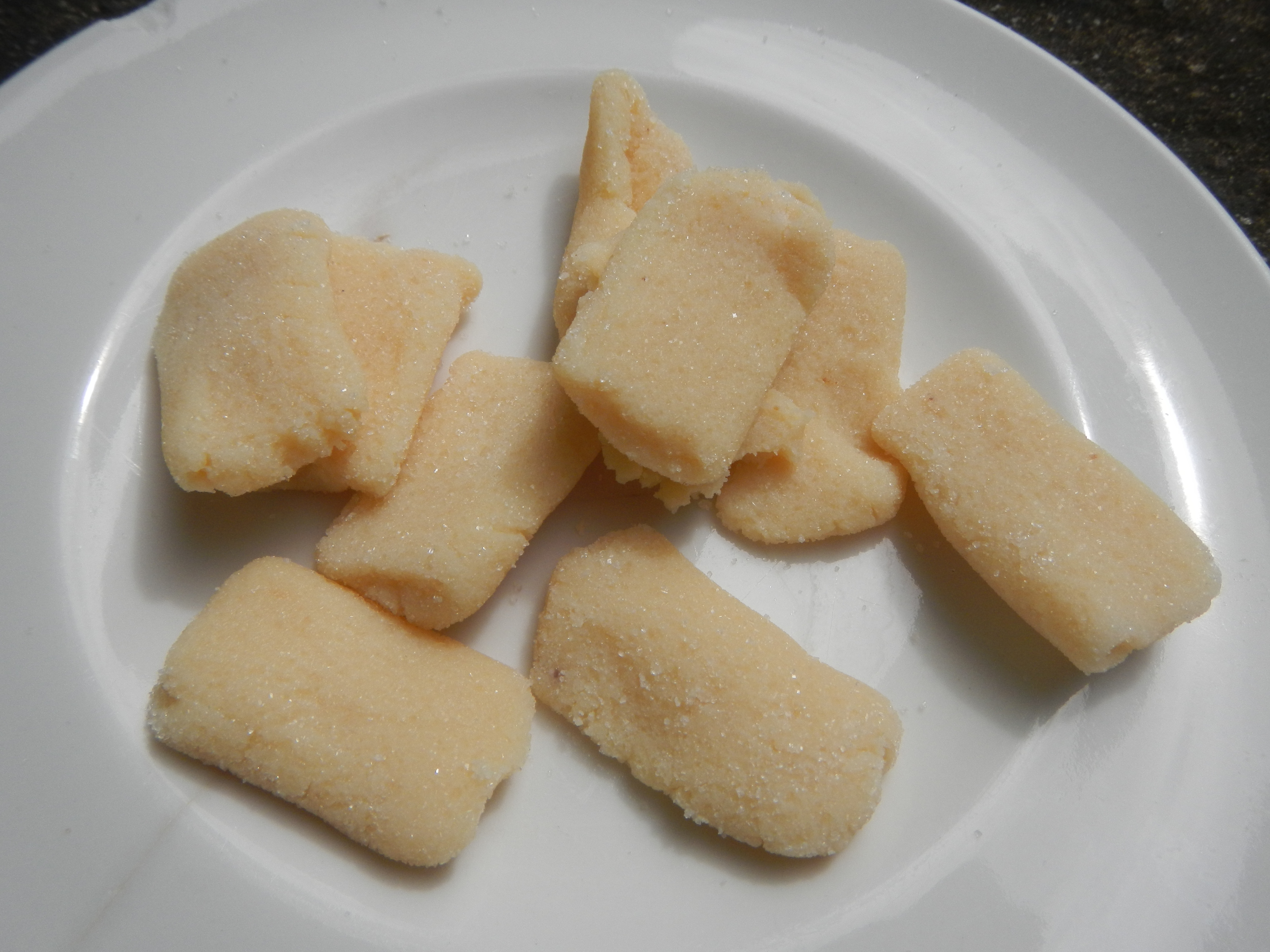
Soft pastillas

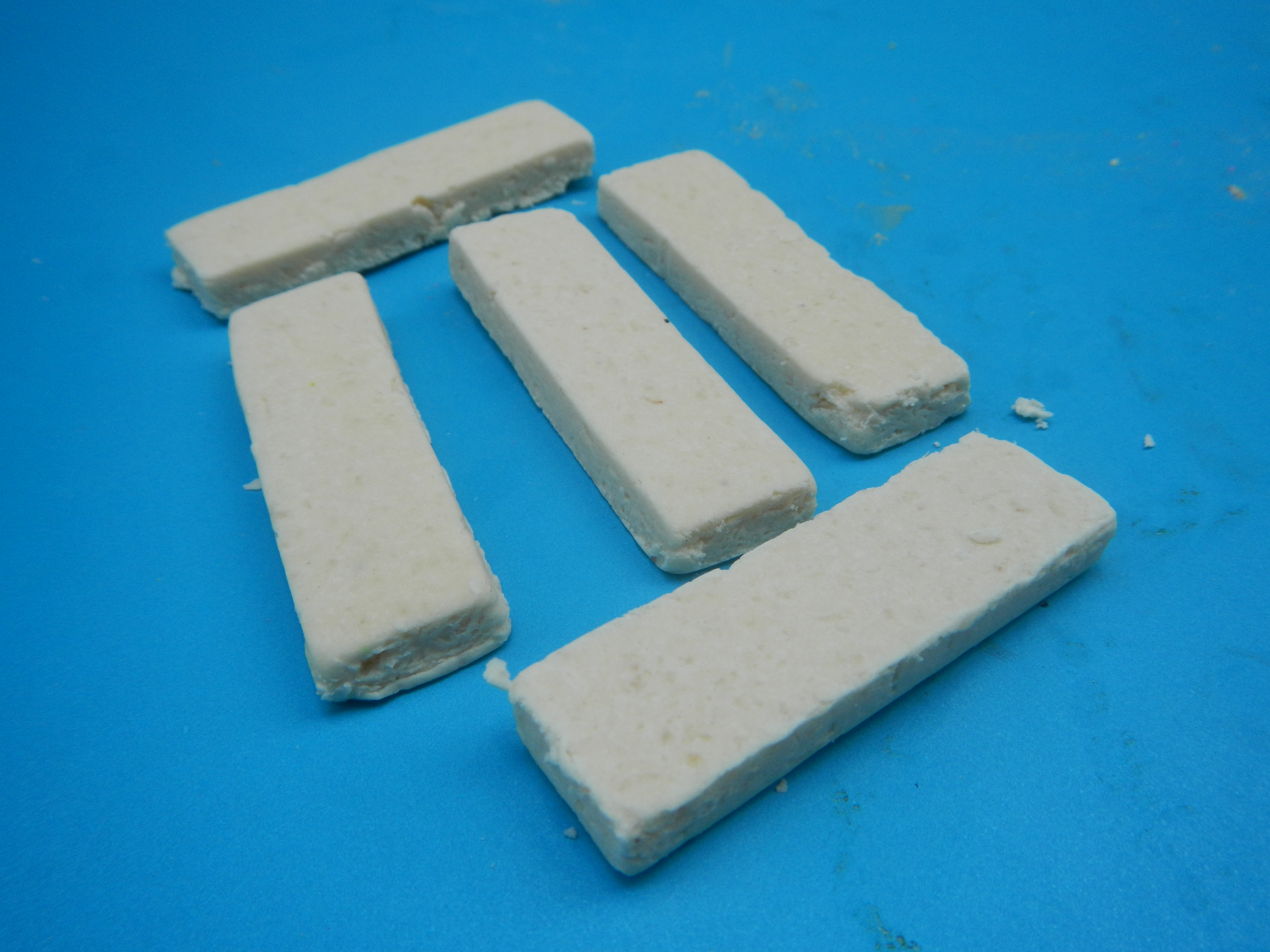
Hard pastillas

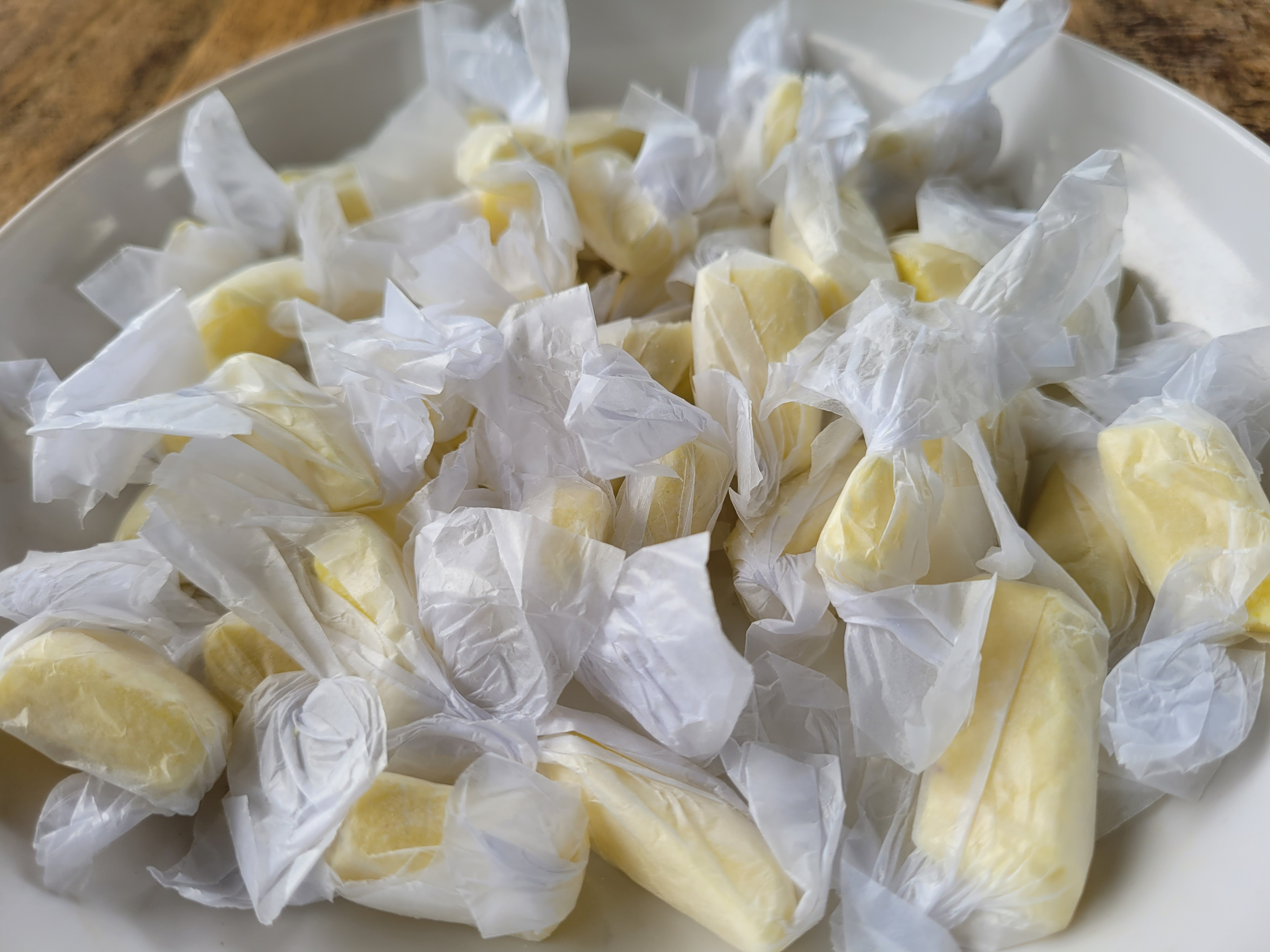
Durian pastillas from the Davao region of southern Mindanao

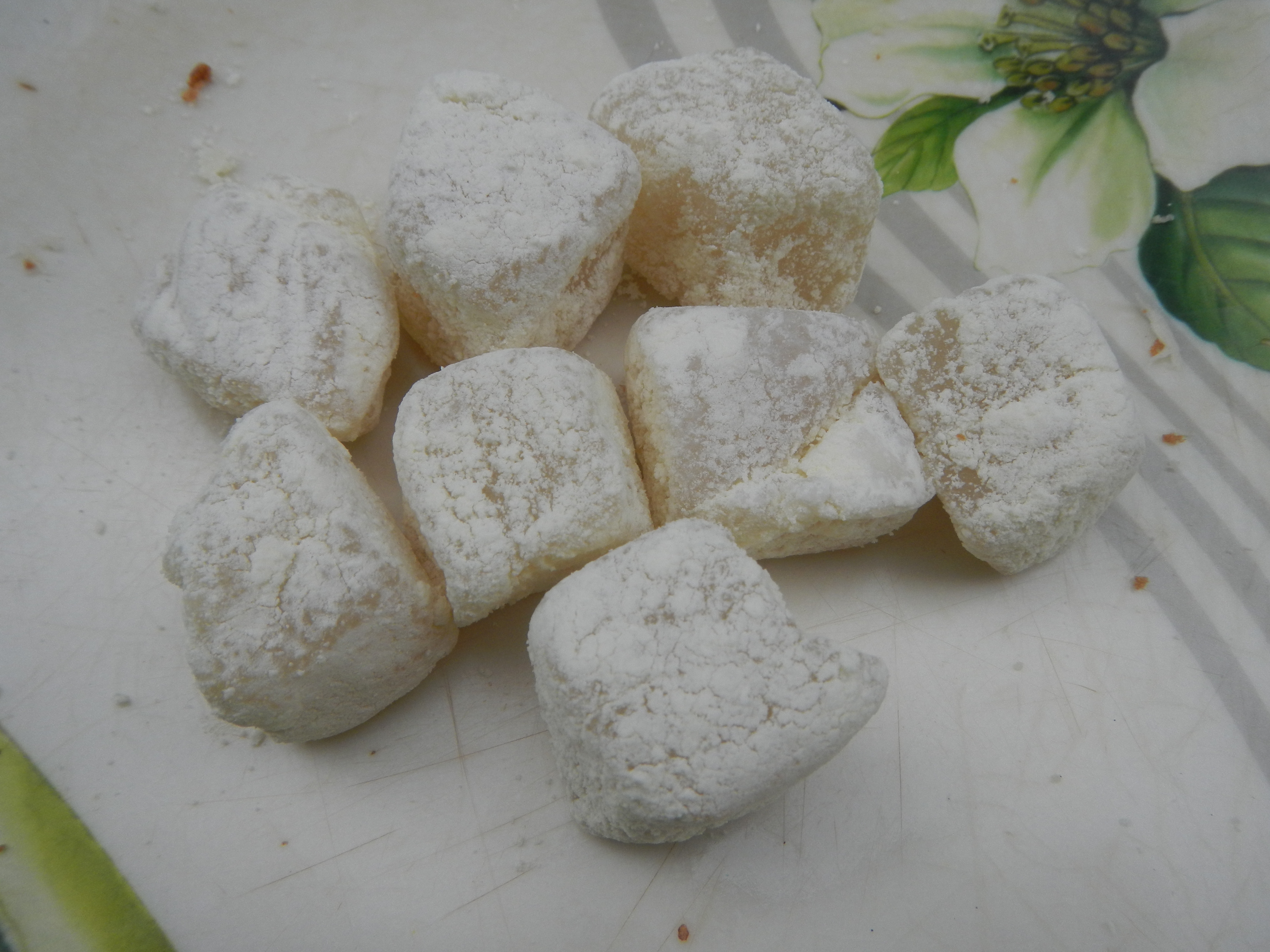
Macapuno pastillas from Bulacan

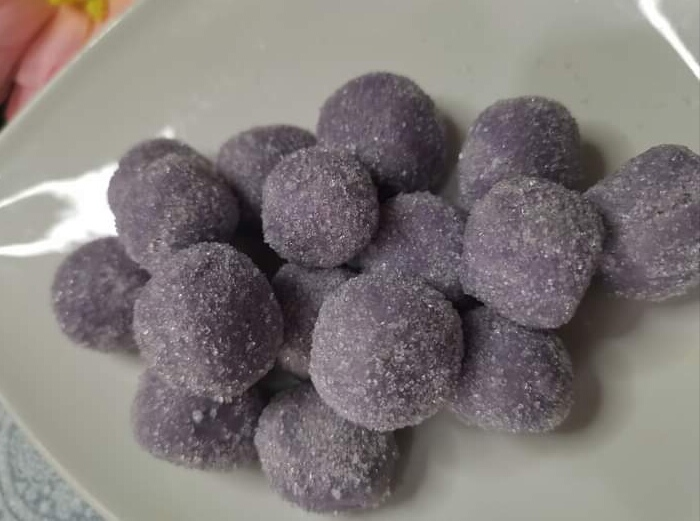
Ube pastillas

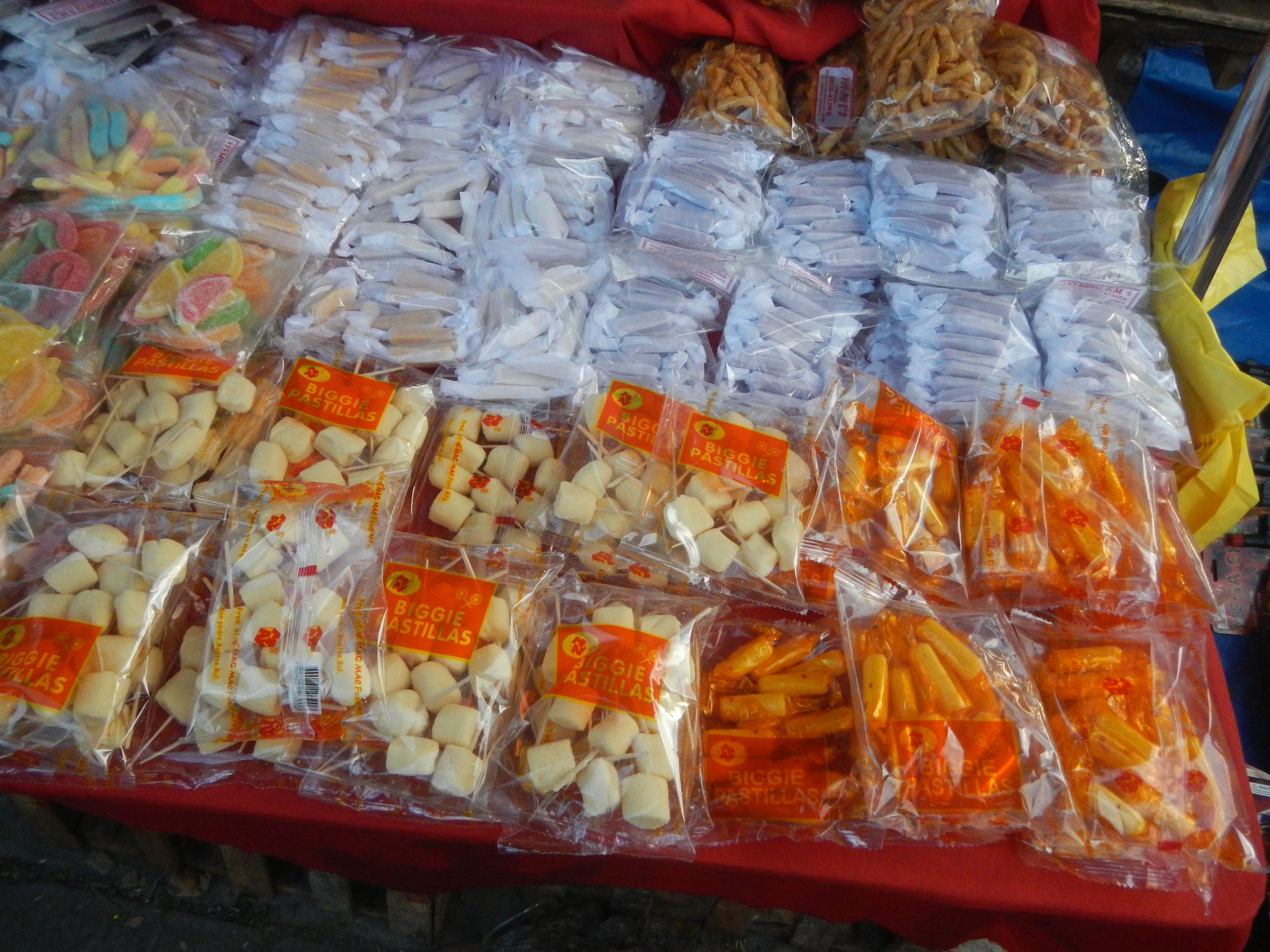
Various types of pastillas from Bulacan

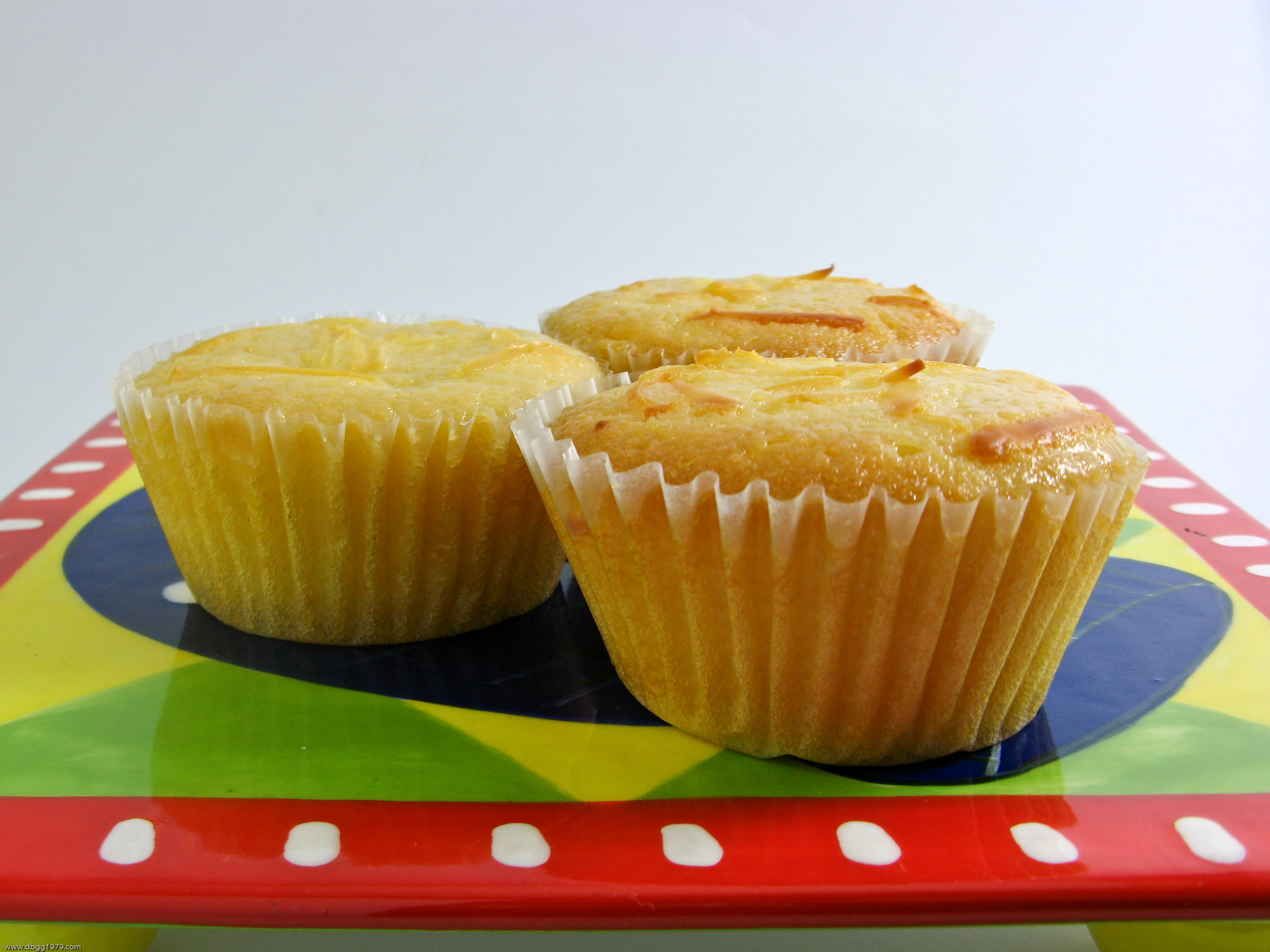
Pastillas cupcake with shredded cheese

== Similar dishes ==
Dulce gatas is another type of confection from Negros Island, which is sometimes considered a type of pastillas since it uses the same ingredients of carabao milk and sugar (in this case, muscovado sugar). Unlike pastillas, however, it is a liquid, and isn't eaten as a candy, but rather as a spread for bread or crackers.

== See also ==
- List of Philippine desserts
