= Yema (candy) =

Filipino candy

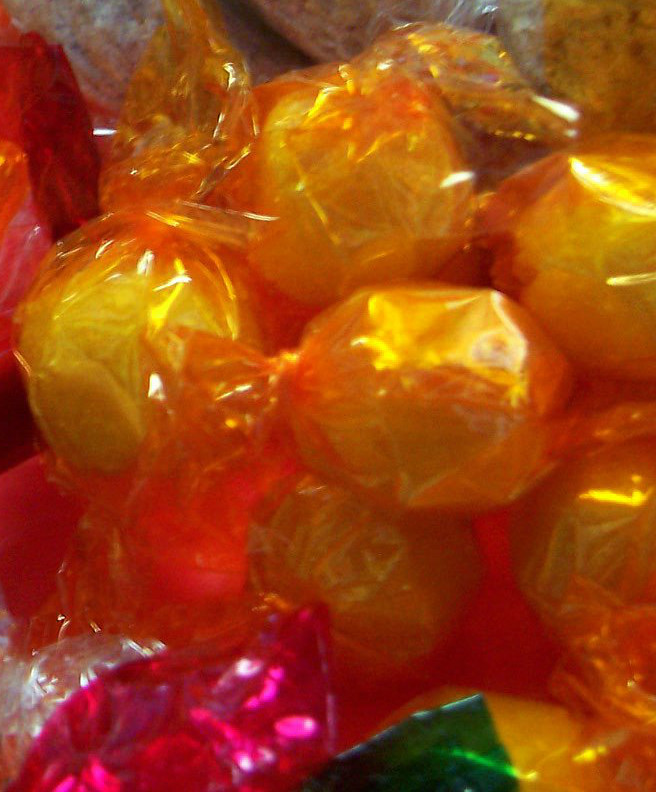
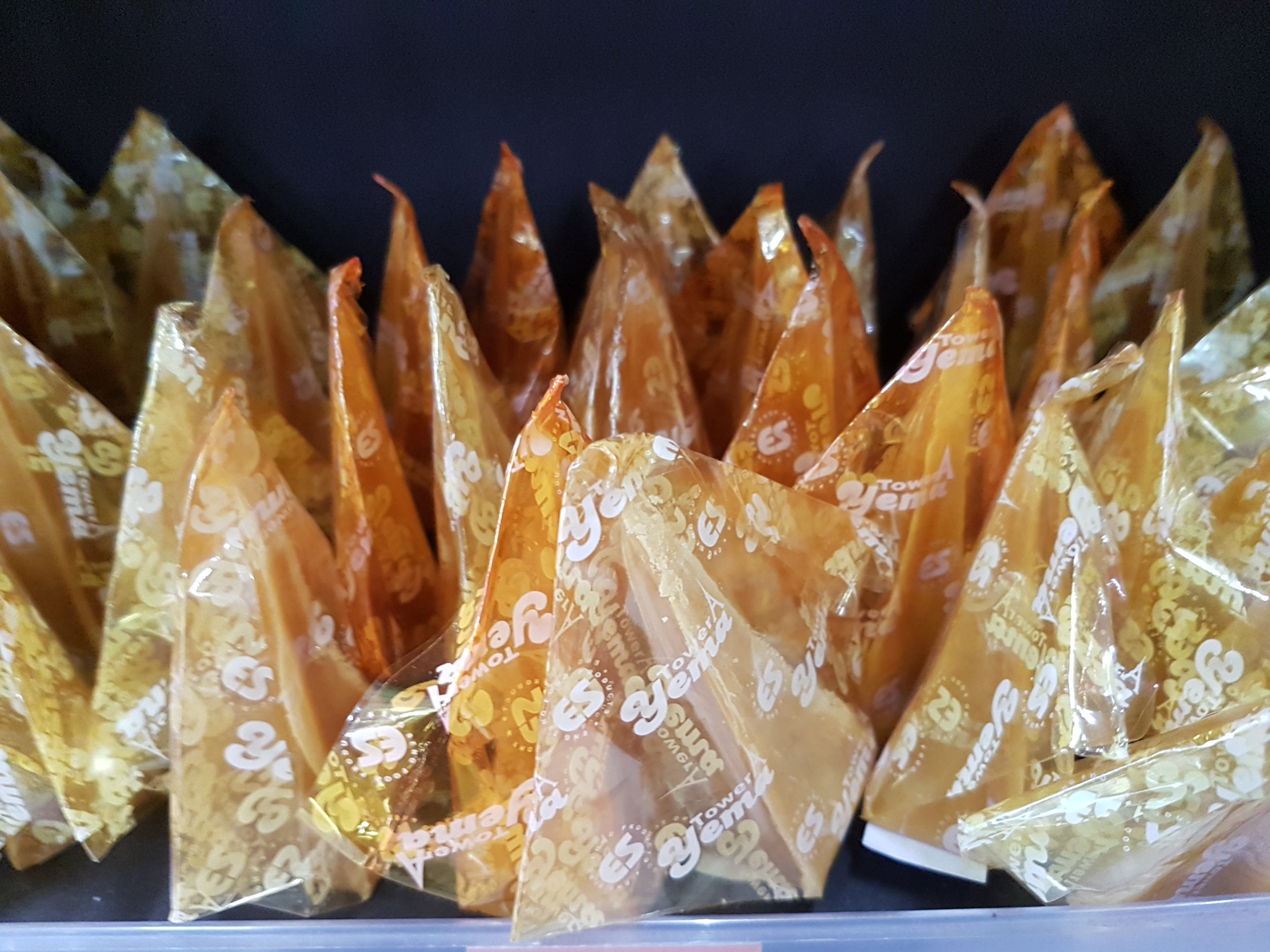
- Top: yema balls Bottom: pyramid-shaped yema
- Type: Sweets
- Place of origin: Philippines
- Region or state: Bulacan
- Main ingredients: egg yolks, sugar, milk

Yema is a sweet custard confectionery from the Philippines. It is made with egg yolks, milk, and sugar.

The name yema is from Spanish for "egg yolk". Like other egg yolk-based Filipino desserts, it is believed that yema originated from early Spanish construction materials. During the Spanish colonization of the Philippines, egg whites mixed with quicklime and eggshells were used as a type of mortar to hold stone walls together. Filipinos reused the discarded egg yolks into various dishes. Among them is yema, which is possibly based on the Spanish pastry Yemas de Santa Teresa.

Modern variations also usually include chopped nuts.

Yema has also evolved into a Filipino custard flavor or Filipino caramel filling for other pastries and sweets like cakes, breads, and bars.

== See also ==
- Yema cake
- Pastel de Camiguín
- Pastillas
- Leche flan
