= San Miguel Arcangel Church (San Miguel, Bulacan) =

Roman Catholic church in Bulacan, Philippines

Diocesan Shrine of San Miguel Arcangel
- Diocesan Shrine and Parish of San Miguel Arcangel
- Parish of Saint Michael the Archangel
- Pandiyosesis na Dambana at Parokya ni San Miguel Arcangel (Filipino); Santuario Diocesano y Parroquia de San Miguel Arcangel (Spanish)
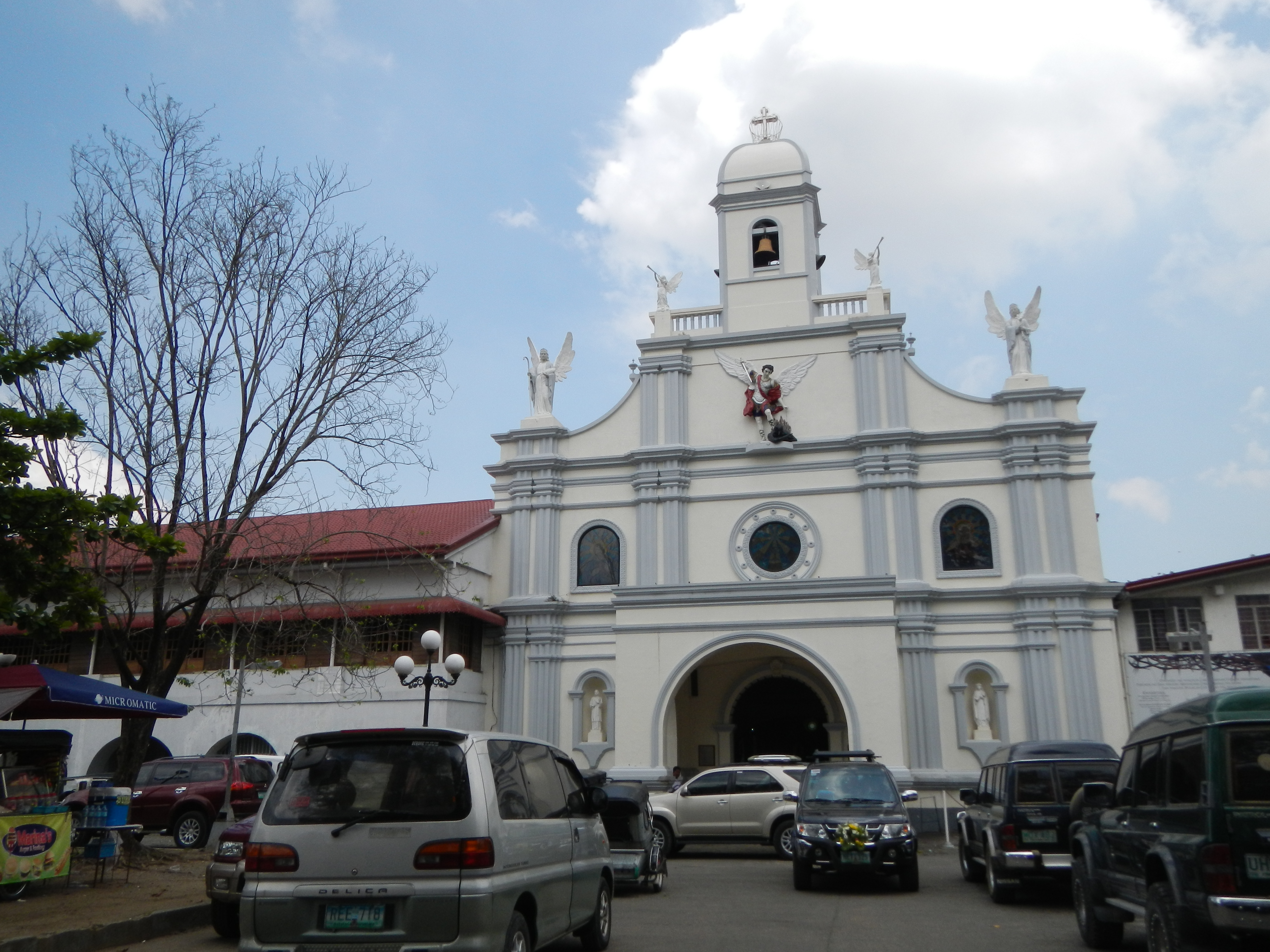
- Church facade in 2014

- Location in Bulacan Location in Luzon Location in the Philippines
- 15°08′27″N 120°58′35″E
- Location: Poblacion, San Miguel, Bulacan
- Country: Philippines
- Denomination: Roman Catholic

History
- Status: Parish church
- Founded: 1725
- Dedication: Saint Michael, the Archangel

Architecture
- Functional status: Active
- Architectural type: Church building
- Style: Baroque
- Completed: 1869

Specifications
- Materials: Stone, Sand, Gravel, Cement, Steel

Administration
- Archdiocese: Manila
- Diocese: Malolos

Clergy
- Archbishop: His Eminence José F. Advincula Jr., D.D.
- Bishop(s): Most Rev. Dennis C. Villarojo, D.D., Ph.D.
- Priest: Rev. Fr. Avelino A. Sampana

The Diocesan Shrine and Parish of San Miguel Arcangel, is a 19th-century, Baroque Roman Catholic church located along De Leon St., Brgy. Poblacion, San Miguel, Bulacan, Philippines. The parish church, with Saint Michael, the Archangel as patron saint, is under the jurisdiction of the Diocese of Malolos.

== History ==
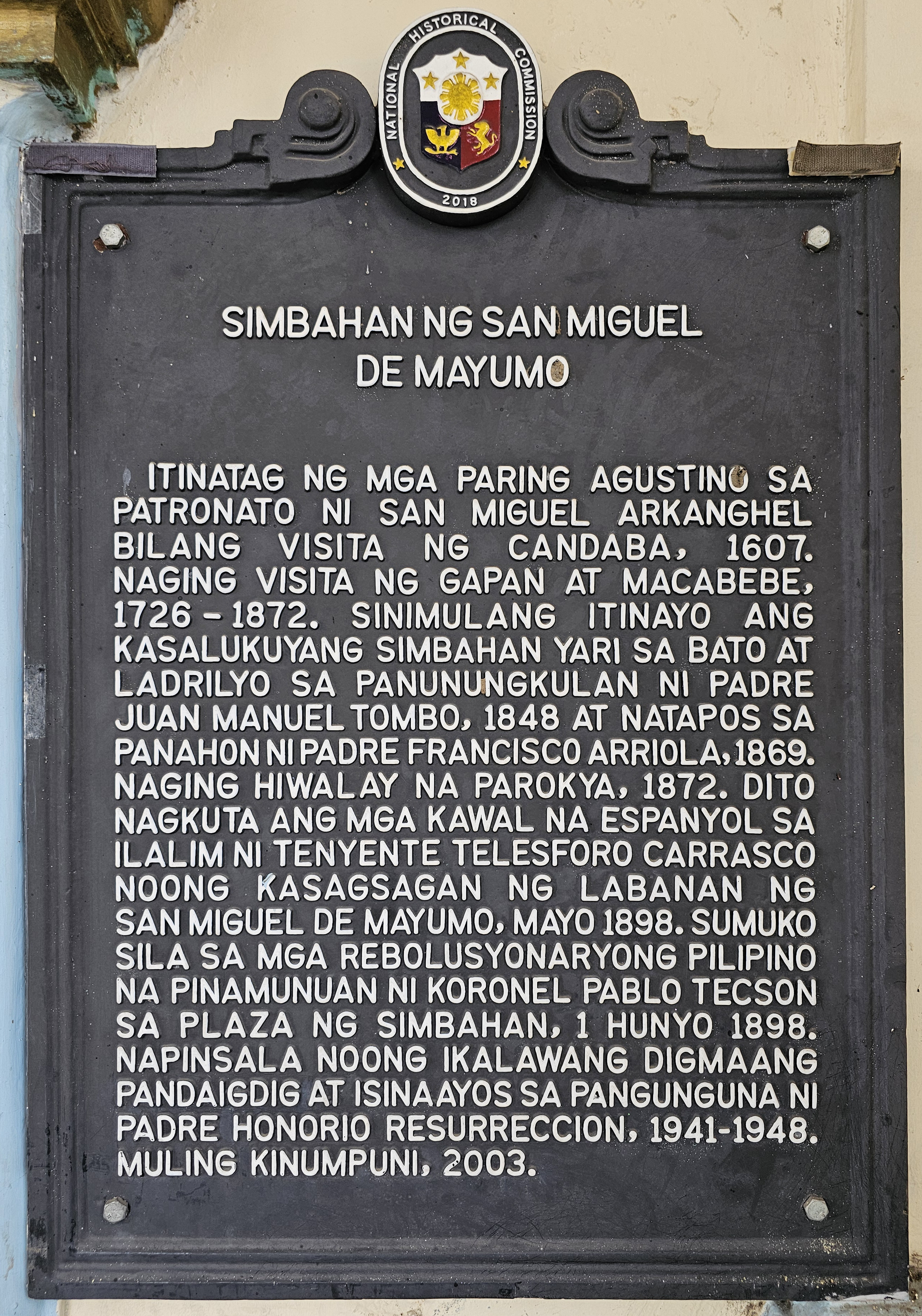
Church NHC historical marker installed in 2018

=== Parish history ===
It is believed that the town of San Miguel was initially established as a town under the province of Pampanga. The parish of San Miguel de Mayumo was founded years before 1607 as a visita of Candaba and was said to be declared an independent parish in 1725. However, some records tell that the parish of San Miguel was later annexed to Gapan in 1726 as a visita. It was also recorded that San Miguel de Mayumo was once annexed to Macabebe, also as a visita.

=== Architectural history ===
There are no records as to who built the first parochial structures in San Miguel. Sources are also not clear as to whether Father Juan Tombo built or simply rebuilt the current church and convent. Father Francisco Arriola continued with the construction until it was complete in 1869. The Catholic cemetery is attributed to Father Arriola while the convent was constructed under Fathers Arriola, Tombo and Ortiz during their respective periods as minister of San Miguel. During World War II in 1941, the roof of the church nave collapsed.

== Architecture ==
The church of San Miguel is the only Spanish-era church in Bulacan with the belfry attached atop the façade pediment. The church, with its predominantly Baroque features, has a two-level façade and a curved pediment surmounted by the rectangular belfry with a bulbous dome. The façade is primarily adorned by the paired pilasters and multi-edged cornices dividing the front into several sections. The base of the façade has two saint’s niches and a concrete porte-cochere that was a late addition into the structure and has replaced a previous one with Corinthian columns. The second level is pierced with an oculus flanked by two semicircular windows. A tableau depicting Saint Michael slaying the dragon adorns the central portion of the pediment.

== Gallery ==
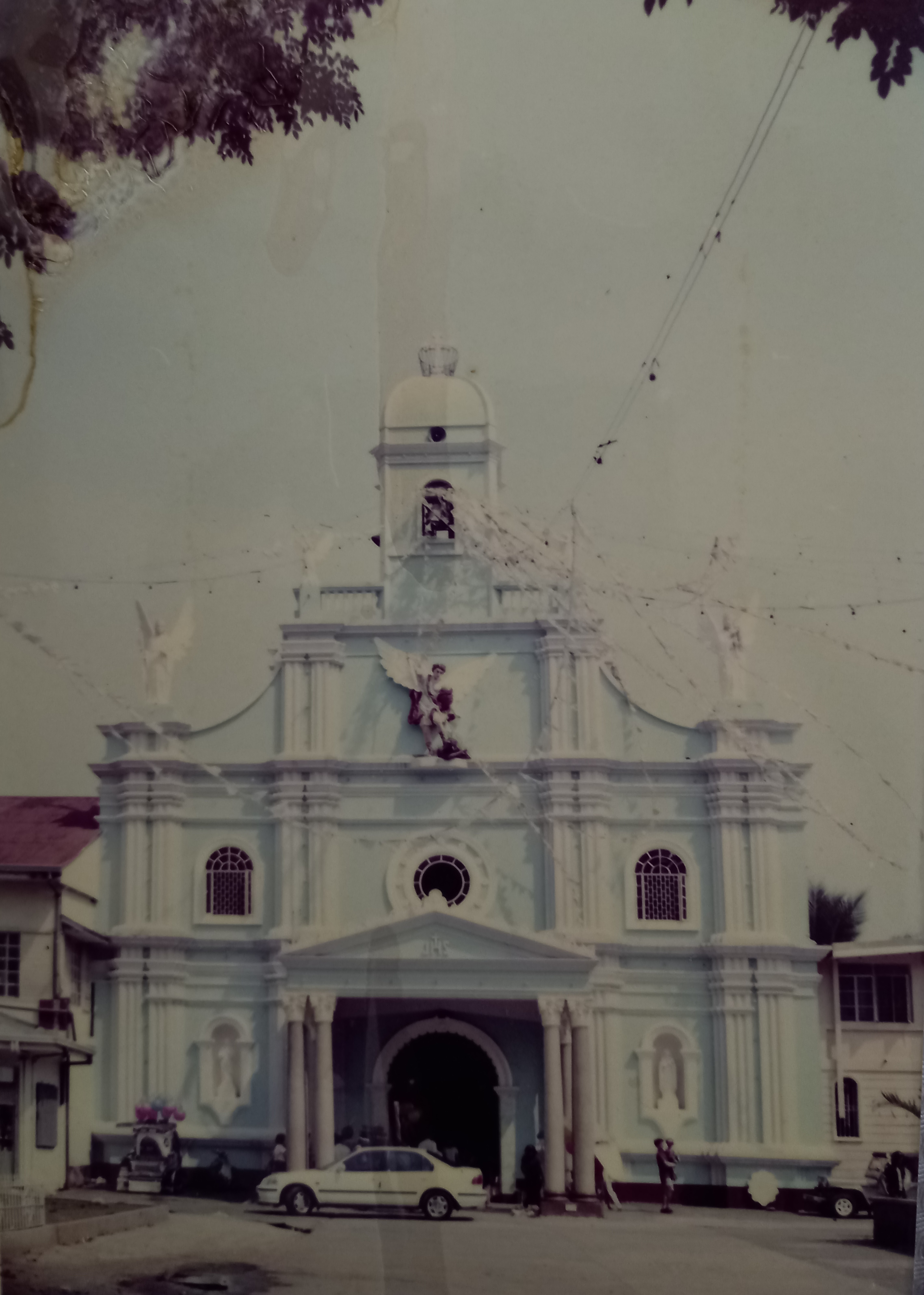
Church exterior, c. 1997

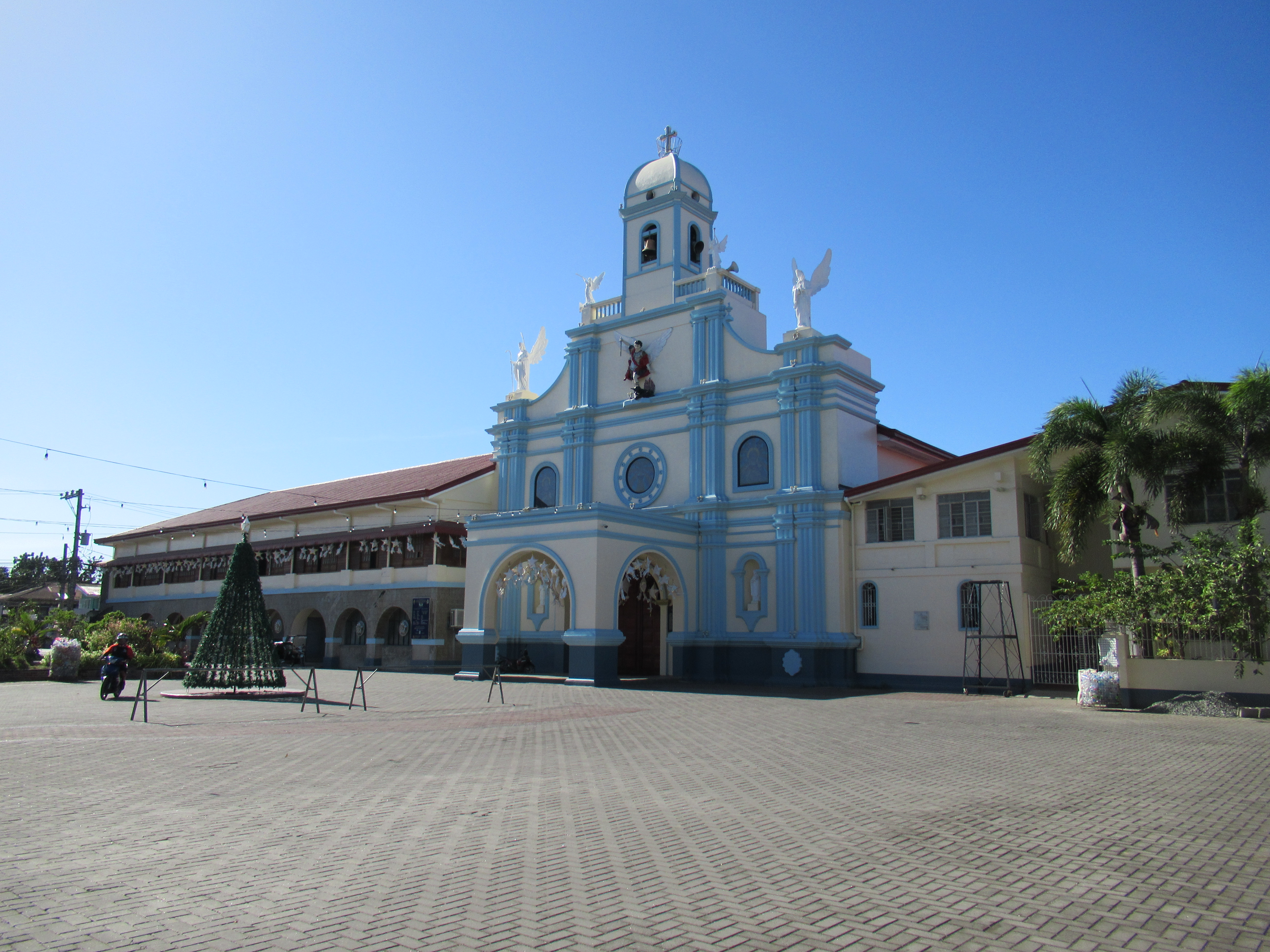
Church exterior, c. 2021

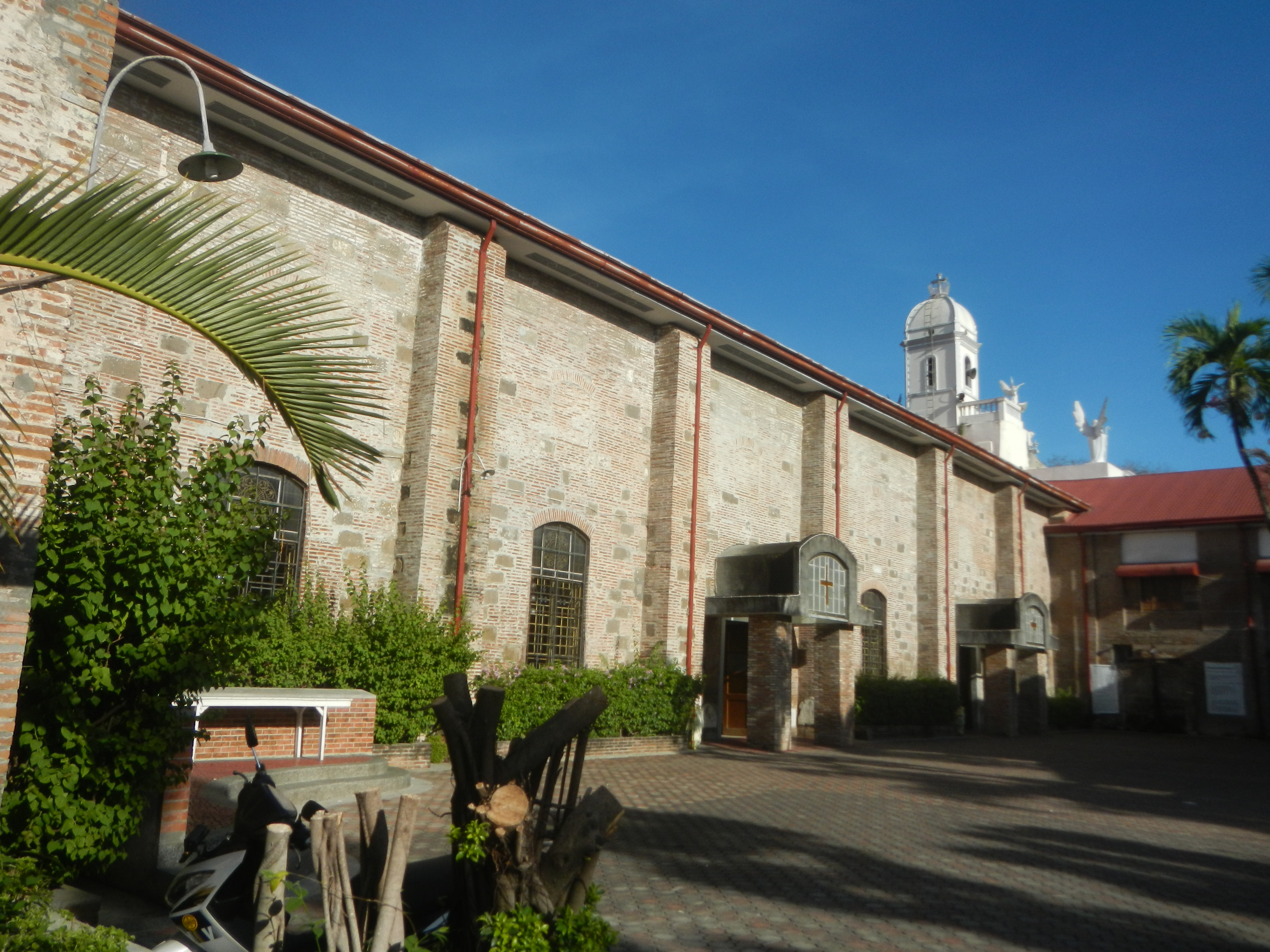
Exterior wall featuring buttresses

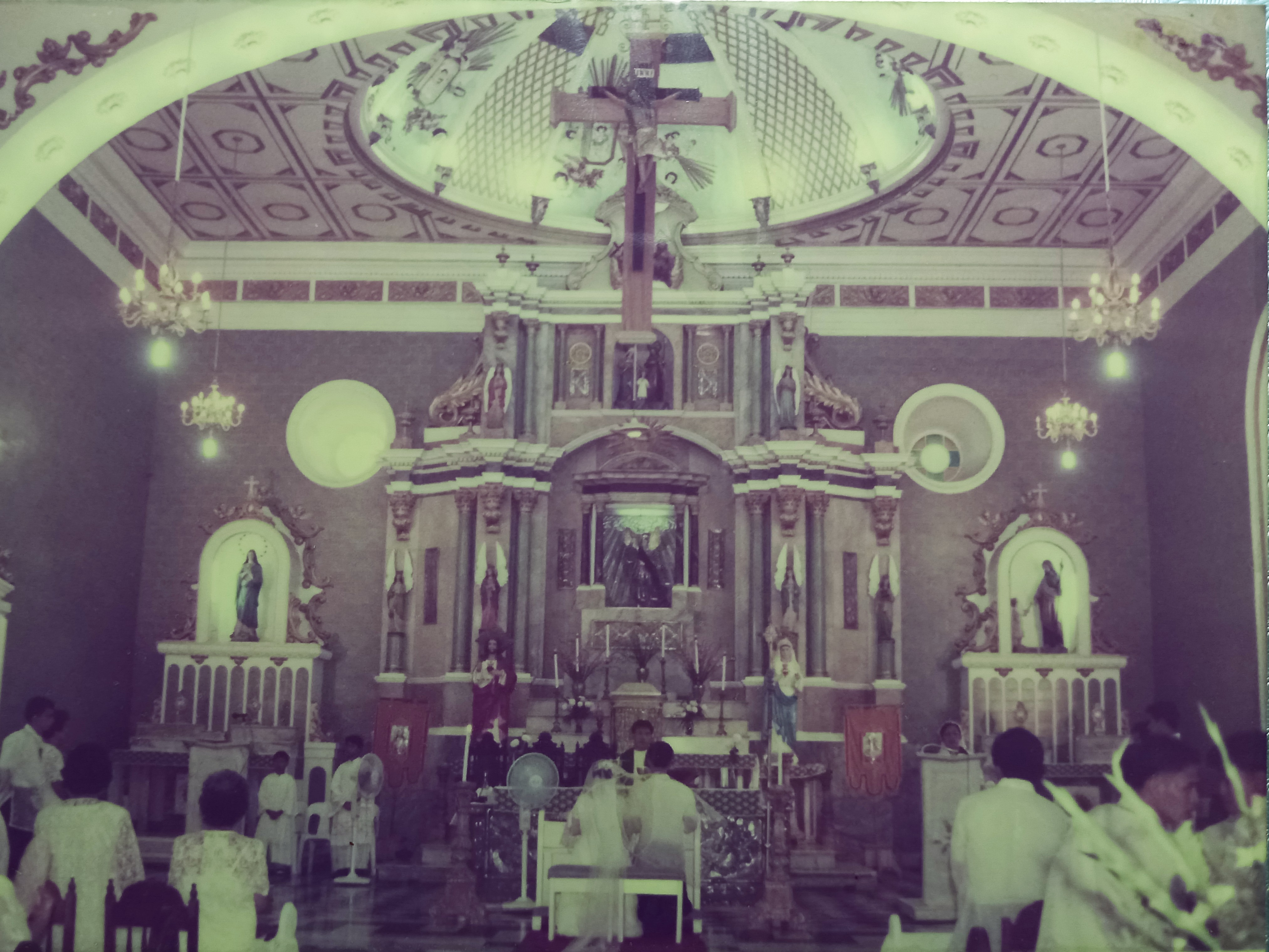
Church interior, c. 1997

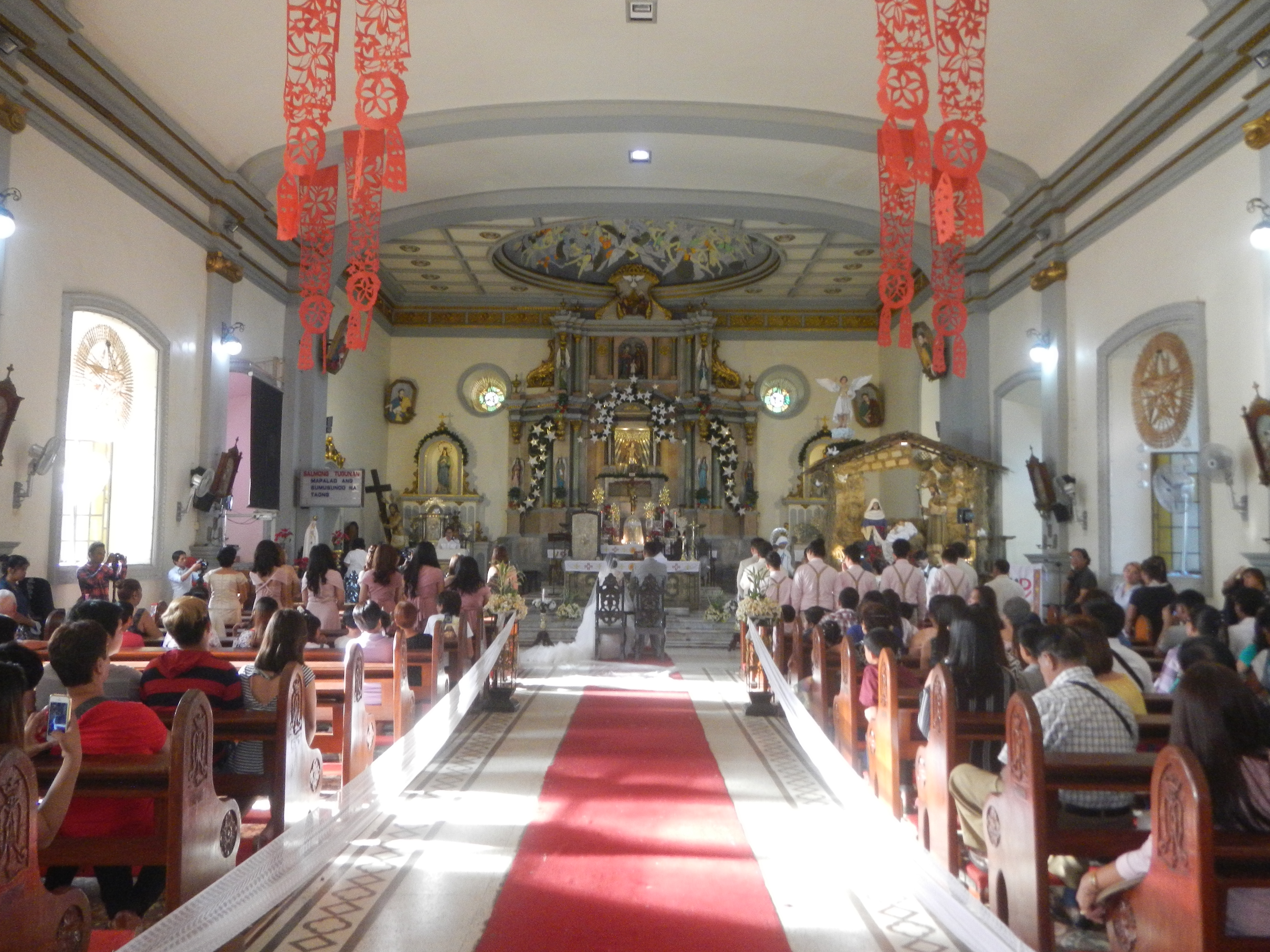
Church interior, c. 2016

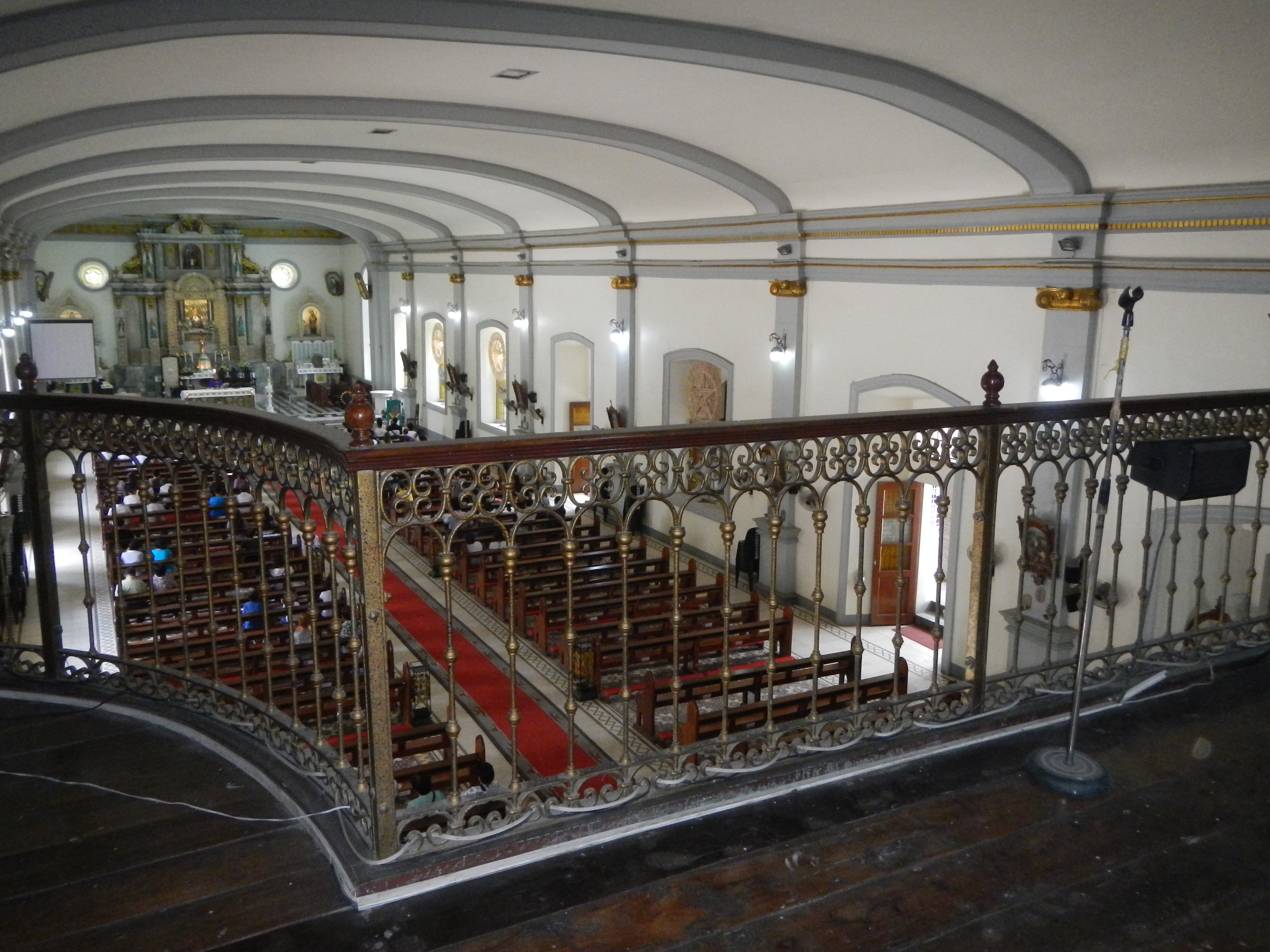
Church interior from the choir loft
