= San Miguel, Bulacan =

Municipality in the Philippines

San Miguel San Miguel de Mayumo
- Municipality
- Municipality of San Miguel
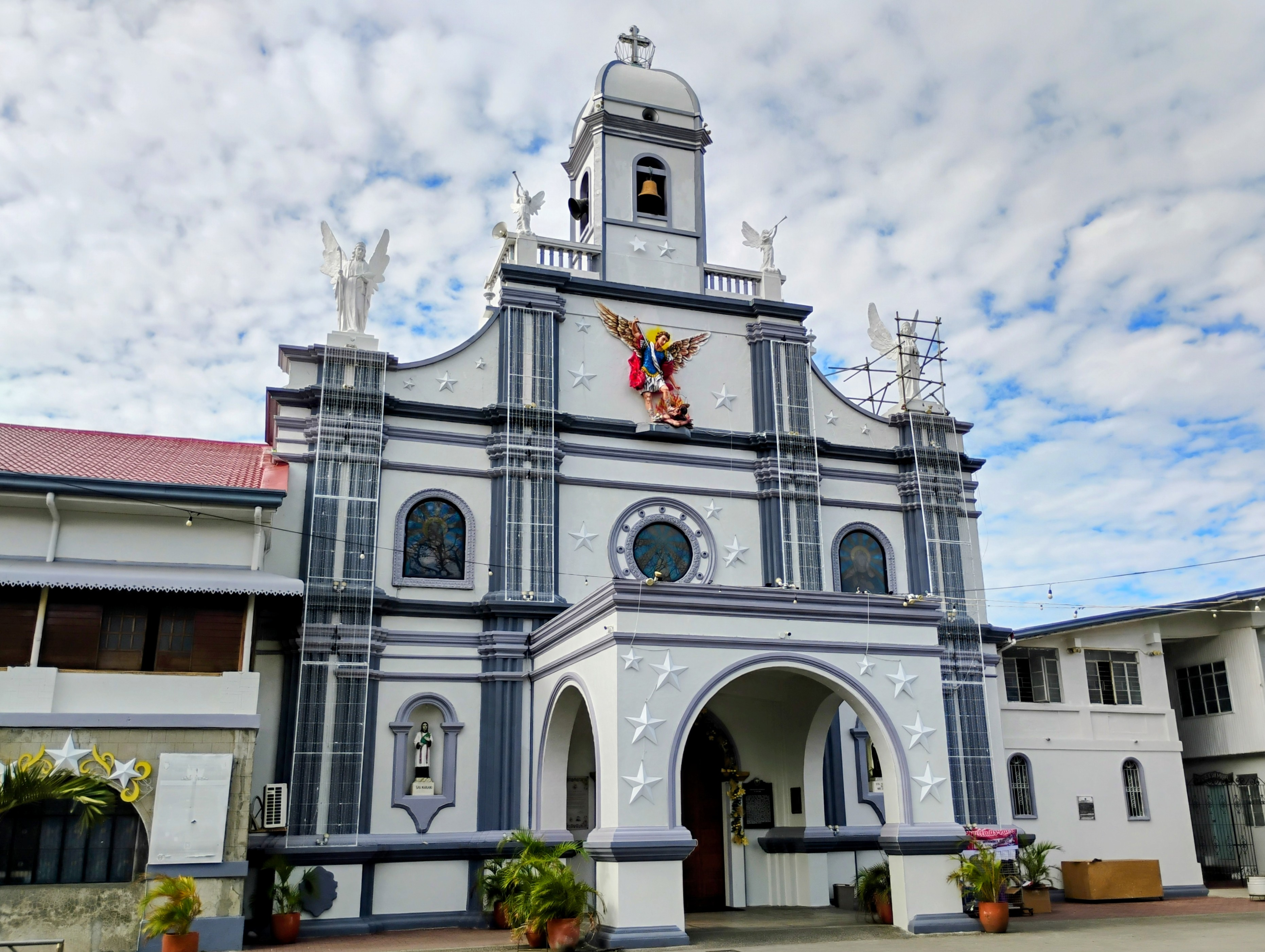
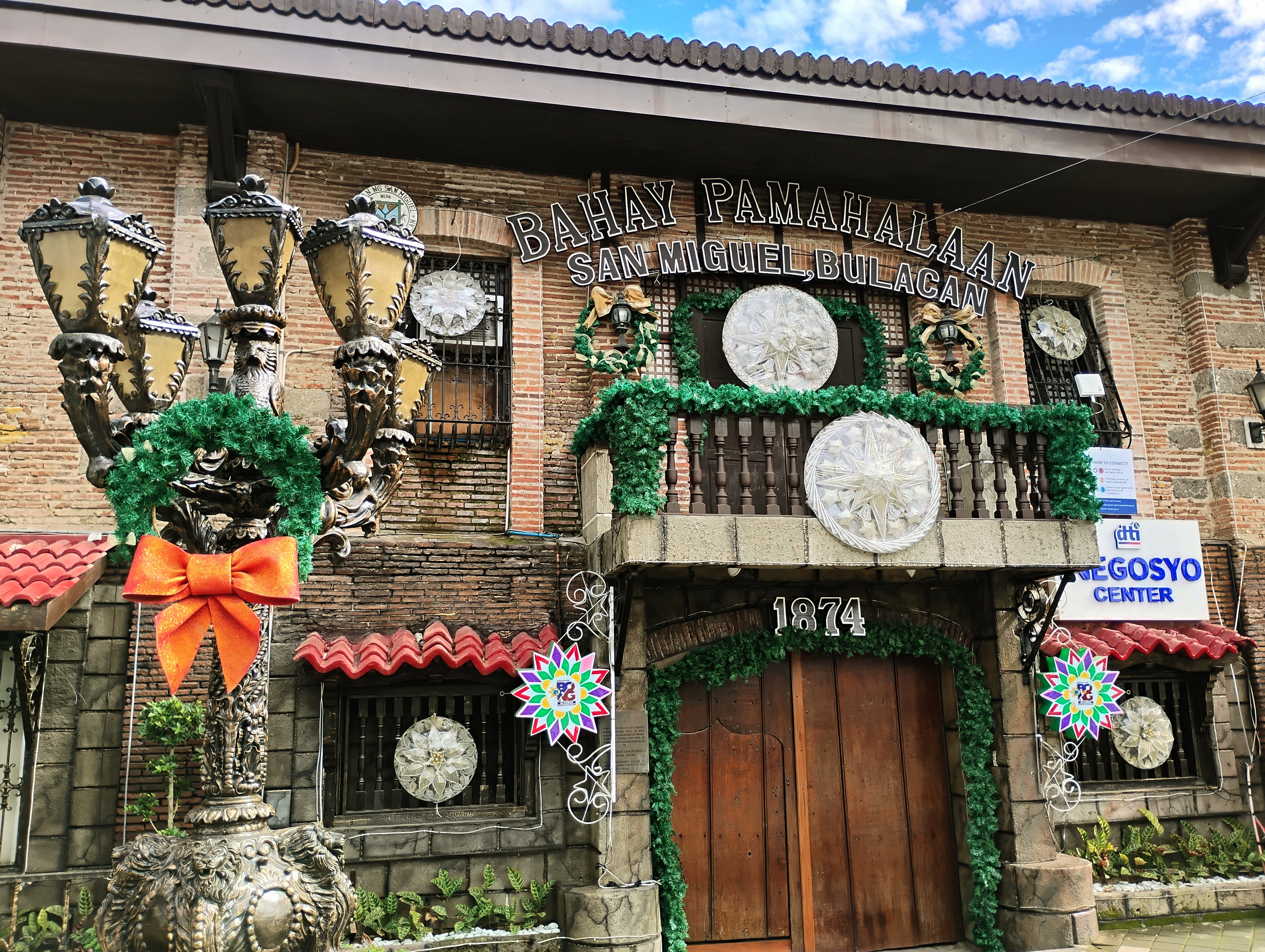
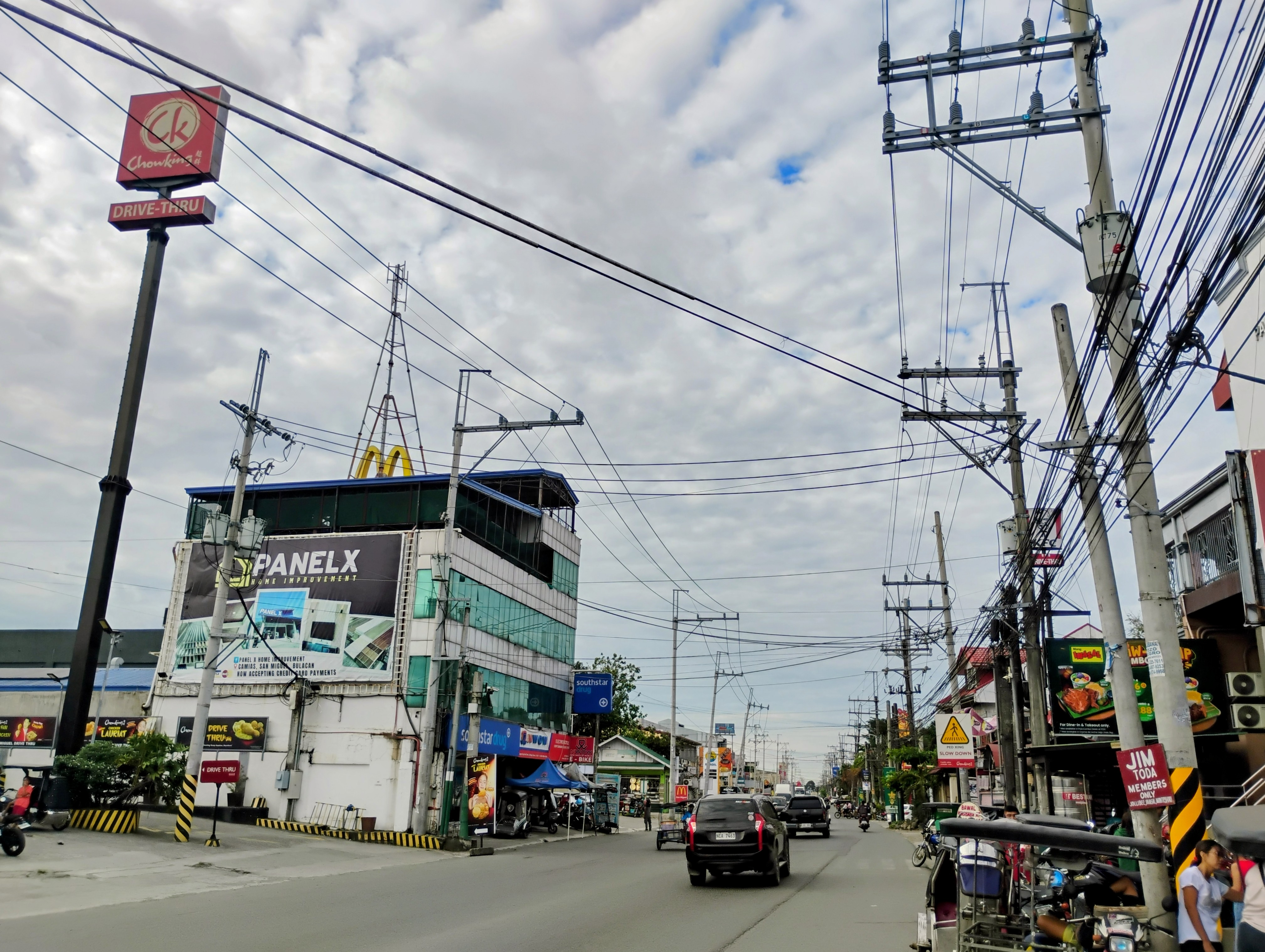
- San Miguel de Mayumo Church San Miguel Municipal Hall Maharlika Highway along San Miguel

- Flag Seal

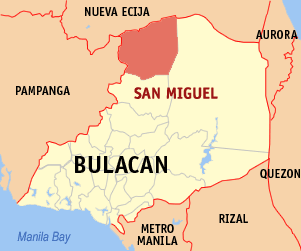
- Map of Bulacan with San Miguel highlighted
- Interactive map of San Miguel
- Location within the Philippines
- Coordinates: 15°08′45″N 120°58′42″E
- Country: Philippines
- Region: Central Luzon
- Province: Bulacan
- District: 3rd district
- Founded: September 29, 1725
- Chartered: 1874
- Named for: St. Michael the Archangel
- Barangays: 49 (see Barangays)

Government
  - Type: Sangguniang Bayan
  - Mayor: John "Bong" A. Alvarez (Lakas-CMD)
  - Vice Mayor: Gerome "Jhong" DC. Reyes (NUP)
  - Representative: Mark Cholo I. Violago
  - Municipal Council: Members: Christopher T. Beltran; Pol David R. Buencamino; Sarah Jane D. Gatchalian; Joseph Noel P. de Guzman; Mary Joy Ann S. Chico; Emmanuel DC. Magtalas; Romeo C. Magat; Wilfredo DL. Dela Cruz
  - Electorate: 105,167 voters (2025)

Area
  - Total: 231.40 km^{2} (89.34 sq mi)
- Elevation: 20 m (66 ft)
- Highest elevation: 54 m (177 ft)
- Lowest elevation: 9 m (30 ft)

Population (2024 census)
  - Total: 179,792
  - Rank: 16 out of 1,489 Municipalities
  - Density: 776.97/km^{2} (2,012.4/sq mi)
  - Households: 40,269

Economy
  - Income class: 1st municipal income class
  - Poverty incidence: 16.33% (2023)
  - Revenue: ₱ 619.7 million (2024)
  - Assets: ₱ 1,317 million (2024)
  - Expenditure: ₱ 497.2 million (2024)
  - Liabilities: ₱ 545.1 million (2024)

Utilities
  - Electricity: Meralco
  - Water: Pamana Water
- Time zone: UTC+8 (PST)
- ZIP code: 3011
- PSGC: 0301421000
- IDD : area code: +63 (0)44
- Native languages: Tagalog; Kapampangan
- Major religions: Catholic
- Feast date: September 29
- Catholic diocese: Diocese of Malolos
- Patron saint: St. Michael the Archangel

San Miguel, officially the Municipality of San Miguel (Tagalog: Bayan ng San Miguel, Kapampangan: Balen ning San Miguel), is a municipality in the province of Bulacan, Philippines. According to the 2024 census, it has a population of 179,792 people.

== Etymology ==
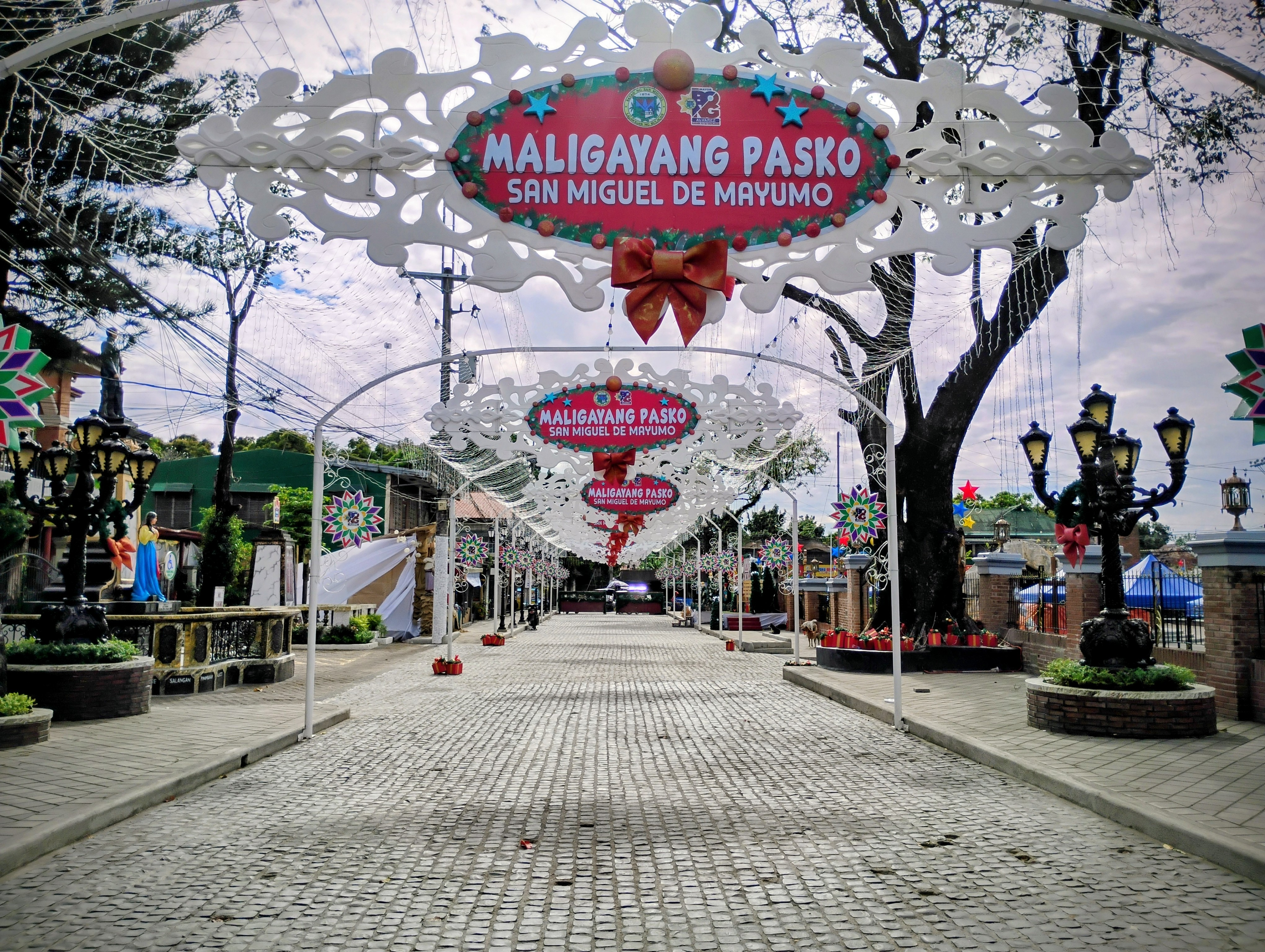
Christmas archways bearing the town's old name, San Miguel de Mayumo

There are two accounts on the origin of the town's name:

- According to the 1953 journal History of Bulacan, the town was originally named Mayumo from the Kapampangan term for "sweets". The Spanish name San Miguel was added by the Augustinian missionaries who selected Michael the Archangel as the patron saint of the town.
- An account tells that the two leaders decided to form a town named Miguel De Mayumo after the name of Miguel Pineda (the town's first gobernadorcillo) and Mayumo, from the Kapampangan term and for the goodwill and generosity of Mariano Puno.

== History ==
=== Spanish colonial era ===
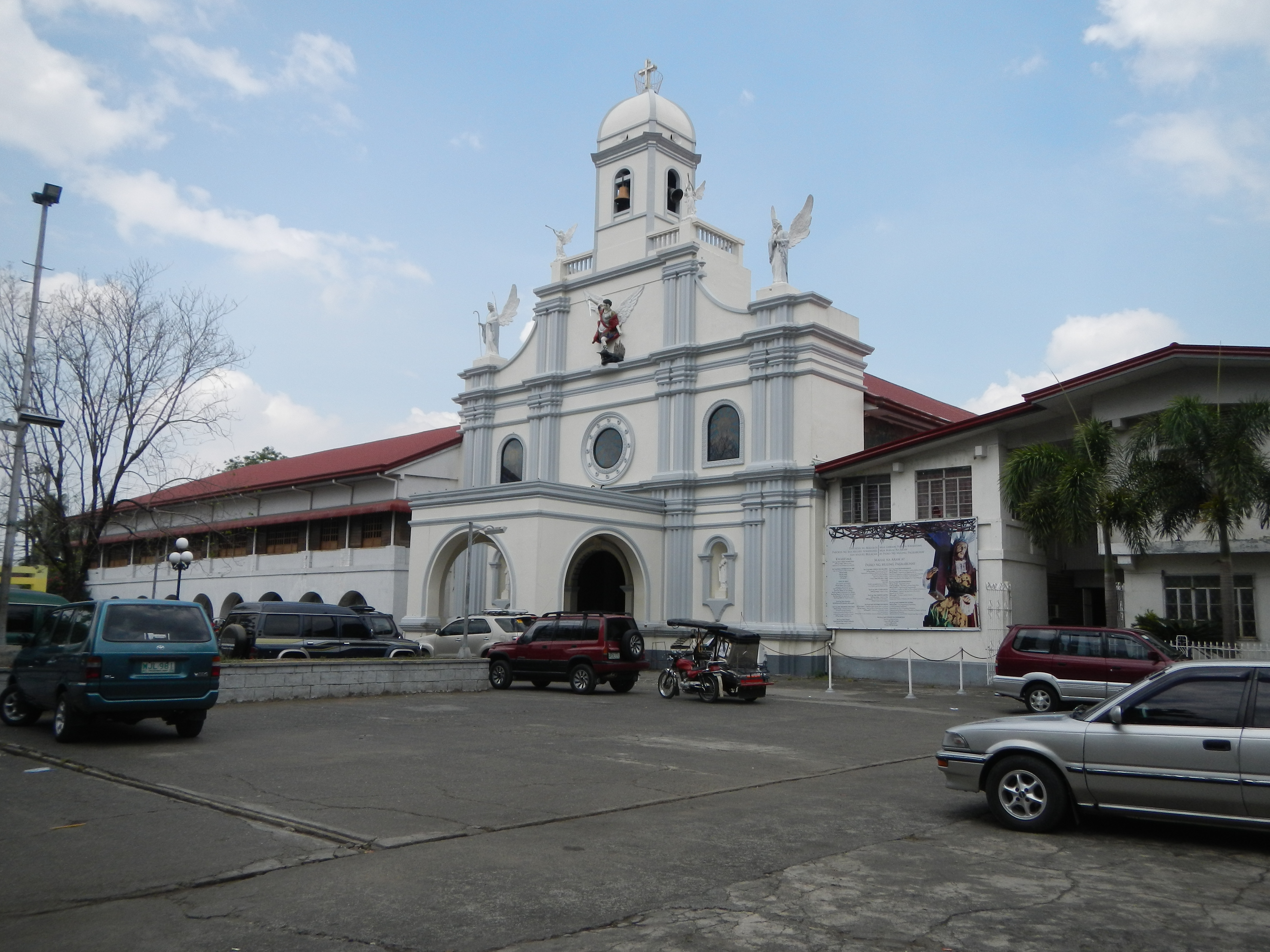
San Miguel Arkanghel Parish Church built by Augustinian missionaries during the Spanish Occupation

The municipality of San Miguel de Mayumo was established in 1763 by Carlos Agustin Maniquiz, his wife Maria Juana Puno, and Miguel Pineda, with Pineda as the first town mayor of San Miguel. Miguel Pineda was a native of Angat, Bulacan who decided to settle permanently in the barrio of San Bartolome (now named Barangay Tartaro). He found the place ideal for hunting and was later chosen as the leader of other settlers. He formed an alliance with Mariano Puno, the recognized leader of the adjacent prosperous village called Santo Rosario (now named Barangay Mandile).

The town was previously part of Pampanga, hence San Miguel's culture having Kapampangan influence; it was separated from Candaba. In 1848, the town and the neighboring barrios, which were then part of Pampanga, were added to the territory of the Province of Bulacan.

==== The Pact of Biak-Na-Bato ====
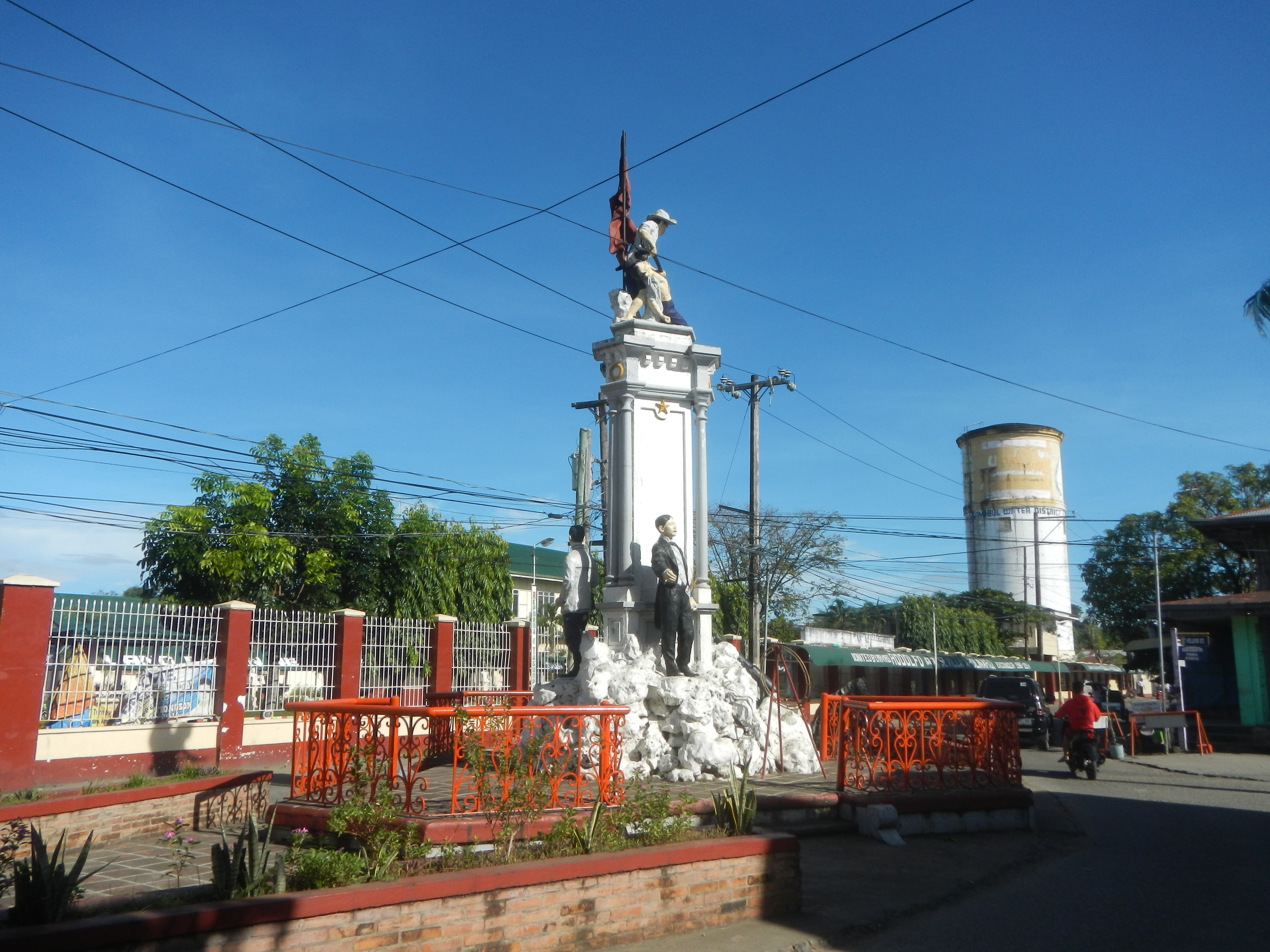
Biak-na-Bato Heroes and San Miguel Martyrs Monument (foreground) and the old American-era water district tower (background)

During the Philippine Revolution in 1897, newly appointed Governor-General Fernando Primo de Rivera decided to crush Emilio Aguinaldo and his troops in Cavite, but Aguinaldo fled to Batangas and joined forces with Gen. Miguel Malvar. The Spaniards continue their pursuit but the troops outwitted them by going to the district of Morong (now Rizal) and finally to Biak-na-Bato in San Miguel, Bulacan. Aguinaldo made the mountain caves into his headquarters.

Biak-na-Bato (21.17 km^{2} (8.17 sq mi) in the villages of Kalawakan and Talbak in Doña Remedios Trinidad town and the villages of Biak-na-Bato and Sibul) served as one of the camps of the revolutionary Katipunan forces during the Philippine Revolution. It was declared a national park by Manuel L. Quezon on November 16, 1937, through Proclamation No. 223.

=== American occupation ===
Between 1903 and 1906, the adjacent town of San Ildefonso was consolidated with San Miguel due to the former's low income and inability to finance its expenditures in operating the local government. It was later separated from the town to become an independent town of its own when it became capable of meeting its expenses.

=== Japanese occupation ===
During World War II, Japanese Imperial ground troops entered and occupied the town municipality of San Miguel on 1942. Soldiers of the Philippine Commonwealth Army and Philippine Constabulary units retreated into the nearby mountains to become the Bulakeño guerrilla resistance against the Japanese occupation forces until the province's liberation.

=== Philippine independence ===
San Miguel was the largest town in the province of Bulacan until September 13, 1977, when Doña Remedios Trinidad, currently the largest municipality of Bulacan, was established under Presidential Decree No. 1196 during the term of President Ferdinand Marcos. Barangays Camachin, Kalawakan, and Talbac were ceded to the new municipality.

=== Contemporary ===
On August 26, 2007, residents at the foot of the Biak-na-Bato mountains petitioned president Gloria Macapagal Arroyo to declare the mountains protected areas to stop marble quarrying and mining in the area.

In August 2014 during a field trip to the Madlum Cave, seven students of Bulacan State University died after they were swept away following heavy rains which triggered a flash flood while crossing the Madlum river.

== Geography ==
The town of San Miguel is bounded by Nueva Ecija Province to the north and Pampanga Province to the west. The town of San Ildefonso, Bulacan lies next to San Miguel to the south; and, Doña Remedios Trinidad, San Rafael, and Angat to the east.

San Miguel then was the biggest municipality in the province of Bulacan before some areas were taken and annexed to Doña Remedios Trinidad during the term of Ferdinand Marcos. The geographic nature of the town is diversified and multi-faceted, rich in nature's beauty like waterfall, rivers, caves, few mountains, hilly areas and springs. The mainland are plain agricultural lands, some part of which was substantially eroded due to commercialization and urbanization.

San Miguel is the third largest municipality by area in the province after Doña Remedios Trinidad and Norzagaray. It is 53 kilometers (33 mi) from Malolos and 76 kilometers (47 mi) from Manila.

=== Climate ===
The prevailing climatic conditions in the municipality is categorized into two types: Wet season and dry season.

- Wet Season - (Rainy season or Monsoon season)
- Dry Season - (Summer season)

Climate data for San Miguel, Bulacan
Month	Jan	Feb	Mar	Apr	May	Jun	Jul	Aug	Sep	Oct	Nov	Dec	Year
Mean daily maximum °C (°F)	28 (82)	29 (84)	31 (88)	33 (91)	32 (90)	31 (88)	30 (86)	29 (84)	29 (84)	30 (86)	30 (86)	28 (82)	30 (86)
Mean daily minimum °C (°F)	20 (68)	20 (68)	21 (70)	22 (72)	24 (75)	24 (75)	24 (75)	24 (75)	24 (75)	23 (73)	22 (72)	21 (70)	22 (72)
Average precipitation mm (inches)	6 (0.2)	4 (0.2)	6 (0.2)	17 (0.7)	82 (3.2)	122 (4.8)	151 (5.9)	123 (4.8)	124 (4.9)	99 (3.9)	37 (1.5)	21 (0.8)	792 (31.1)
Average rainy days	3.3	2.5	11.7	6.6	17.7	22.2	25.2	23.7	23.2	17.9	9.2	5.2	168.4
Source: Meteoblue

=== Barangays ===
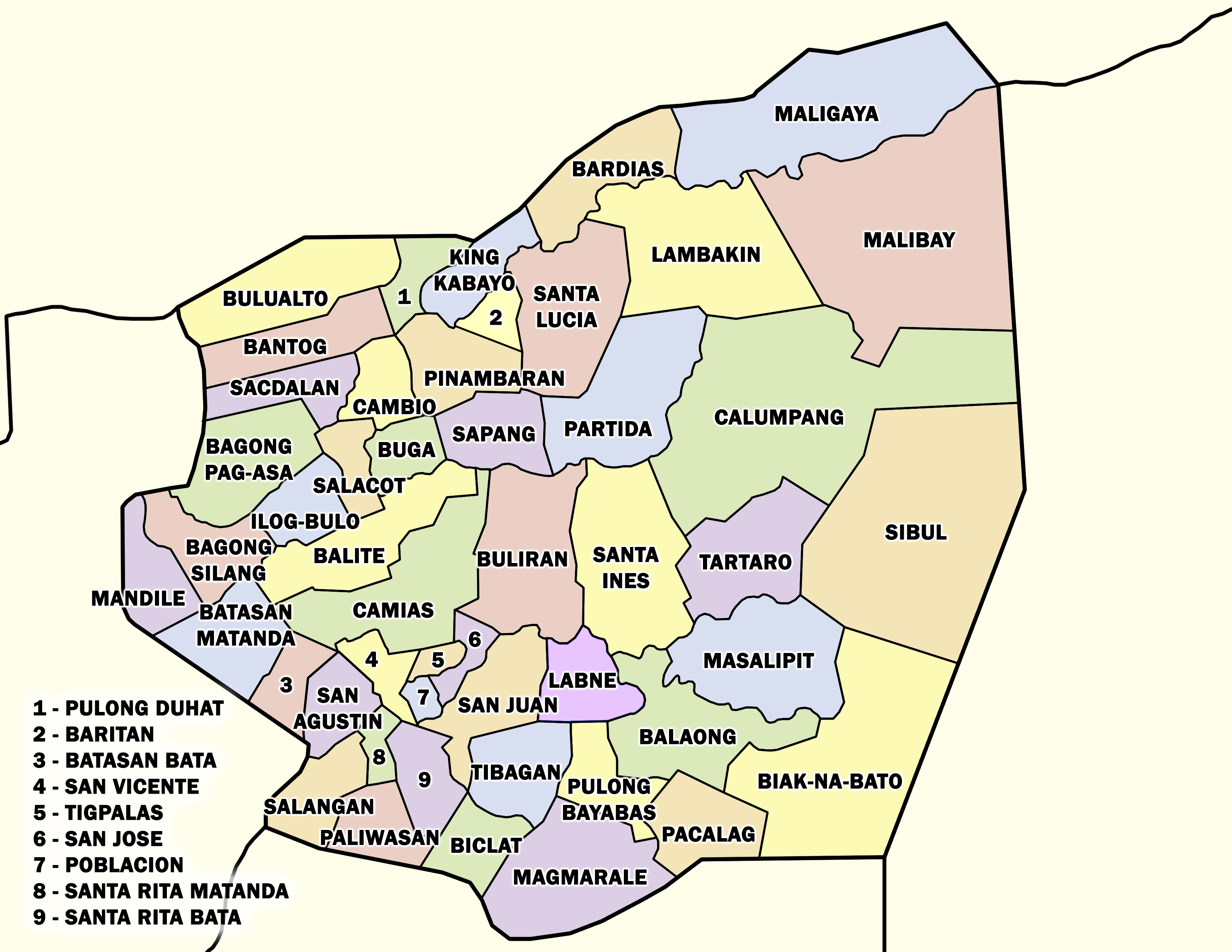
Political map of San Miguel

San Miguel is politically subdivided into 49 barangays, as shown in the matrix below. Each barangay consists of puroks and some have sitios

There are 11 urban and the rest rural barangays in the town.

PSGC	Barangay	Population			±% p.a.	
		2024		2010		
031421001	Bagong Silang	1.0%	1,876	1,625	▴	0.99%
031421002	Balaong	1.5%	2,670	2,678	▾	−0.02%
031421003	Balite	1.4%	2,598	2,365	▴	0.65%
031421004	Bantog	2.1%	3,695	3,129	▴	1.15%
031421006	Bardias	0.9%	1,636	1,590	▴	0.20%
031421007	Baritan	0.9%	1,553	1,351	▴	0.96%
031421008	Batasan Bata	1.1%	2,037	2,014	▴	0.08%
031421009	Batasan Matanda	1.7%	3,003	2,839	▴	0.39%
031421011	Biak‑na‑Bato	1.0%	1,737	1,631	▴	0.43%
031421012	Biclat	1.0%	1,870	1,594	▴	1.10%
031421013	Buga	0.8%	1,512	1,476	▴	0.17%
031421014	Buliran	2.7%	4,862	4,753	▴	0.16%
031421015	Bulualto	1.6%	2,873	2,642	▴	0.58%
031421016	Calumpang	2.2%	3,980	3,859	▴	0.21%
031421019	Cambio	1.0%	1,886	1,902	▾	−0.06%
031421020	Camias	4.2%	7,560	7,426	▴	0.12%
031421021	Ilog‑Bulo	0.9%	1,604	1,554	▴	0.22%
031421023	King Kabayo	0.9%	1,662	1,533	▴	0.56%
031421024	Labne	0.8%	1,431	1,416	▴	0.07%
031421025	Lambakin	1.6%	2,805	2,686	▴	0.30%
031421027	Magmarale	1.2%	2,163	2,059	▴	0.34%
031421028	Malibay	1.1%	1,935	1,906	▴	0.10%
031421030	Mandile	1.0%	1,878	1,752	▴	0.48%
031421031	Masalipit	1.6%	2,883	2,583	▴	0.76%
031421032	Pacalag	0.6%	1,165	999	▴	1.06%
031421033	Paliwasan	1.6%	2,849	2,633	▴	0.54%
031421035	Partida	1.8%	3,205	3,164	▴	0.09%
031421036	Pinambaran	2.1%	3,860	4,100	▾	−0.41%
031421037	Poblacion	1.7%	3,127	3,115	▴	0.03%
031421038	Pulong Bayabas	1.1%	2,030	1,438	▴	2.40%
031421039	Sacdalan	1.2%	2,216	2,160	▴	0.18%
031421040	Salacot	1.7%	3,127	3,140	▾	−0.03%
031421041	Salangan	2.8%	5,056	4,610	▴	0.64%
031421043	San Agustin	2.1%	3,755	3,673	▴	0.15%
031421044	San Jose	2.8%	4,951	4,805	▴	0.21%
031421045	San Juan	4.8%	8,602	6,854	▴	1.57%
031421046	San Vicente	1.6%	2,860	3,083	▾	−0.52%
031421047	Santa Ines	3.3%	6,000	5,572	▴	0.51%
031421048	Santa Lucia	1.9%	3,335	3,145	▴	0.40%
031421049	Santa Rita Bata	1.6%	2,945	2,853	▴	0.22%
031421050	Santa Rita Matanda	1.6%	2,829	2,656	▴	0.43%
031421051	Sapang	0.9%	1,632	1,324	▴	1.45%
031421052	Sibul	5.7%	10,161	9,322	▴	0.59%
031421054	Tartaro	3.3%	6,001	4,506	▴	1.99%
031421055	Tibagan	2.0%	3,678	3,249	▴	0.86%
031421056	Bagong Pag‑asa	0.7%	1,314	1,226	▴	0.48%
031421057	Pulong Duhat	0.8%	1,389	1,030	▴	2.08%
031421058	Maligaya	1.2%	2,092	1,847	▴	0.86%
031421059	Tigpalas	2.2%	3,994	3,987	▴	0.01%
	Total		179,792	142,854	▴	1.59%

== Demographics ==
Population census of San Miguel
Year	Pop.	±% p.a.
1903	14,919	—
1918	17,988	+1.25%
1939	26,759	+1.91%
1948	38,093	+4.00%
1960	43,195	+1.05%
1970	58,712	+3.11%
1975	66,870	+2.64%
1980	73,113	+1.80%
1990	91,124	+2.23%
1995	108,147	+3.26%
2000	123,824	+2.94%
2007	138,839	+1.59%
2010	142,854	+1.04%
2015	153,882	+1.43%
2020	172,073	+2.38%
2024	179,792	+1.06%
Source: Philippine Statistics Authority

In the 2020 census, the population of San Miguel, Bulacan, was 172,073 people, with a density of 740 inhabitants per square kilometer or 1,900 inhabitants per square mile.

=== Languages ===
The municipality, along with two other municipalities (Remedios Trinidad and Norzagaray) and one city (San Jose del Monte) of Bulacan, is the homeland of the Alta Kabulowan, the first inhabitants of Bulacan, whose language is also called Alta Kabulowan. Their language is currently endangered and is in dire need of local government intervention. The majority of residents in the town are native speakers of the Tagalog language. Due to its proximity with Pampanga towns and it was part of Pampanga, some residents also speak the Kapampangan language.

=== Religion and Traditions ===
Currently, San Miguel is divided into four parishes and a large number of visitas, all of which are under the jurisdiction of the Diocese of Malolos. These are Diocesan Shrine and Parish of San Miguel Arcangel located in Brgy. Poblacion; San Jose Esposo de Maria Parish located in Brgy. San Jose; Nuestra Señora delos Remedios Parish located in Brgy. Sibul Springs; and Sacred Heart of Jesus Parish located in Brgy. Salacot.

The traditions are well-preserved in San Miguel, as shown by the Holy Week processions in the mother church, which include about 60 carrozas. Numerous images of our Lord, the Blessed Mother, and saints, visited this church, such as the Nuestro Padre Jesus Nazareno of Quiapo and La Purisima Concepcion de Santa Maria. Every May 8, San Miguel holds its town fiesta, and every September 29, it celebrates its Pistang Patron celebration.

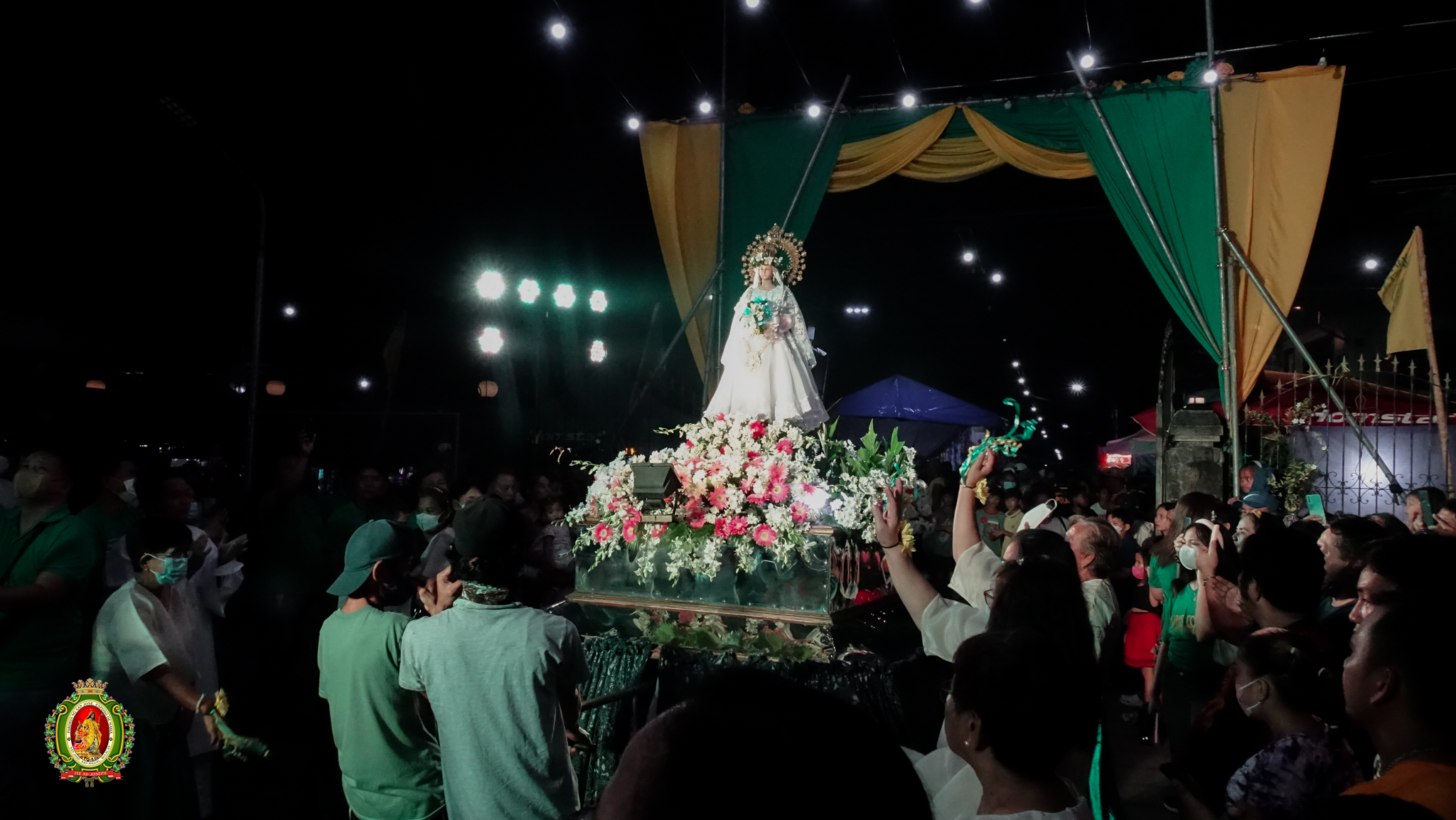
Procession de los Desposorios

The tradition of Los Desposorios or the Betrothal of Mary and Joseph continues at San Jose Esposo de Maria Parish in Brgy. San Jose. The said parish celebrates its fiesta every 26 November, the traditional date which the Augustinians celebrates the feast of the Betrothal. It starts with the Procesion de los Desposorios, after which the antique image of Saint Joseph and Our Lady meet at the patio of the parish and the rite of the Renewal of Vows is conducted.

== Economy ==
Poverty incidence of San Miguel (%)

Source: Philippine Statistics Authority

== Local Government ==
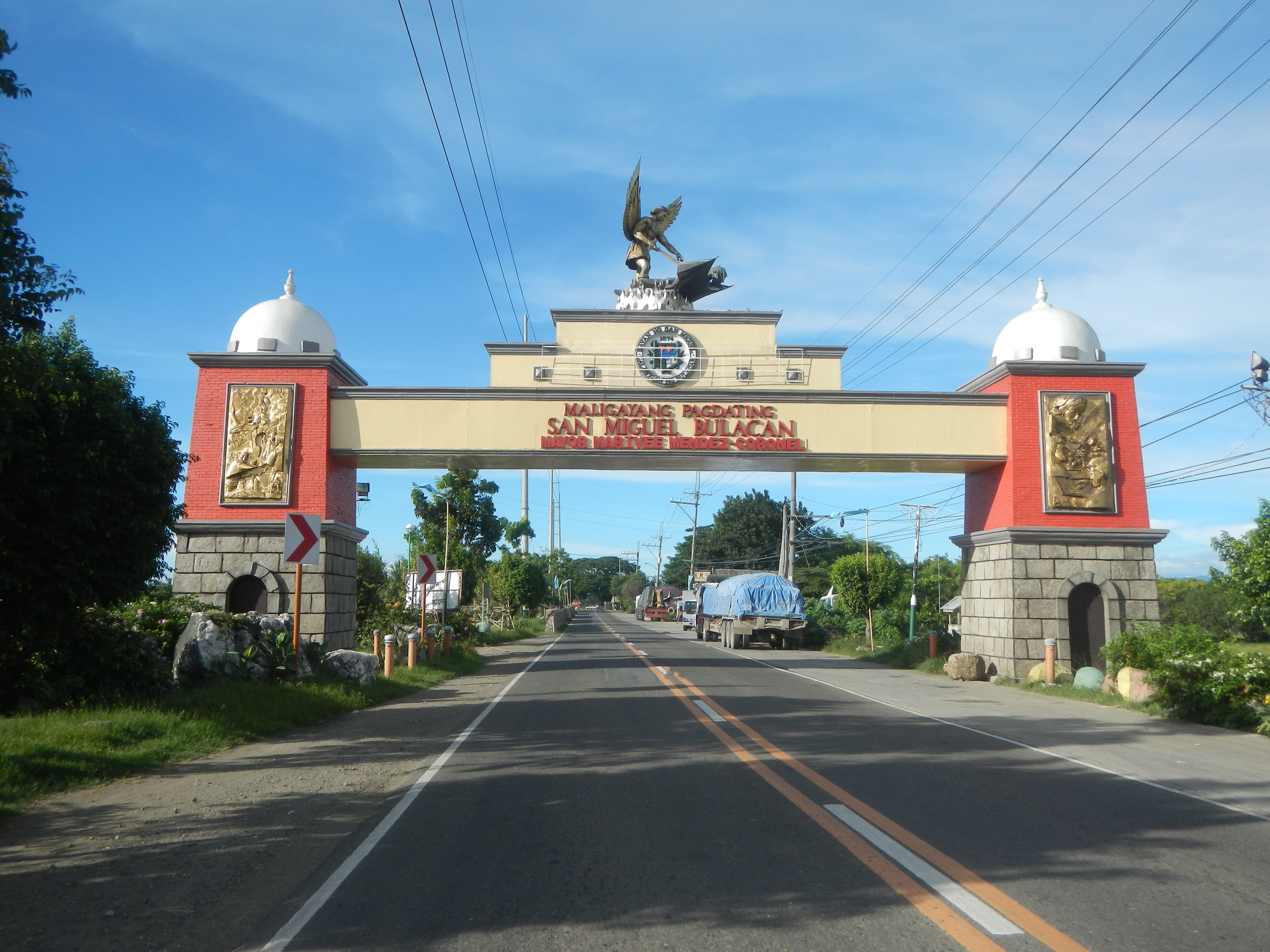
San Miguel Welcome Arch from San Ildefonso, Bulacan

2025-2028 San Miguel, Bulacan Officials
Position	Name	Party
Mayor	John "Bong" A. Alvarez	Lakas
Vice Mayor	Gerome D. Reyes	NUP
Councilors	Christopher T. Beltran	Lakas
Councilors	Pol David R. Buencamino	PFP
Councilors	Sarah Jane D. Gatchalian	Lakas
Councilors	Joseph Noel P. De Guzman	Lakas
Councilors	Mary Joy Ann S. Chico	PFP
Councilors	Emmanuel D. Magtalas	Lakas
Councilors	Romeo C. Magat	PFP
Councilors	Wilfredo D. Dela Cruz	PFP
Ex Officio Municipal Council Members
ABC President	TBD	Nonpartisan
SK Federation President	TBD	Nonpartisan

=== List of Gobernadorcillo ===
Name	Term		Name	Term	Name	Term	Name	Term	
Miguel Pineda	1763		Ignacio Sandulan	1796	Agapito Santa Ana	1827	Victor Buencamino	1858	
Jose Malapandan	1764		Agustin Payawal	1797	Carlos Morales	1828	Norberto Maniquis	1859	
Miguel Ligon	1765	1766	Santiago Maniquis	1798	Jacinto Ligon	1829	Eugenio Dantis	1860	
Miguel Tecson	1767		Marcos Bondoc	1799	Mariano Tecson	1830	Pedro Santiago	1861	
Miguel Bantog	1768		Nicolas Bacaui	1800	Augustin Santiago	1831	Mariano Macapagal	1862	
Miguel Ligon	1769		Eusebio Santiago	1801	Isidro Gonzales	1832	Jose Santiago	1863	1864
Esteban Bantog	1770		Francisco Bernabe	1802	Eustaquio Ligon	1833	Bonifacio Pengson	1865	1866
Miguel Ligon	1771		Calixto Yambot	1803	Vicente Ventura	1834	Tomas Tecson	1867	1868
Esteban Sayson	1772		Jose Tuazon	1804	Apolonio Fernando	1835	Antonio David	1869	1870
Eulogio Payawal	1773		Baltazar Pangilinan	1805	Severino Payawal	1836	Pelagio de Leon	1871	1872
Dionisio Maniquiz	1774		Jose Payawal	1806	Andres de la Cruz	1837	Marcelo Velayo Bernardo	1873	1874
Antonio Bacual	1775		Francisco Libunao	1807	Vicente Felix	1838	Flaviano Esguerra	1875	1876
Miguel Ligon	1776	1777	Vicente Sayson	1808	Eusebio Dantis	1839	Juan Buencamino	1877	1878
Dionisio Maniquis	1778		Augustin Maniquis	1809	Atanacio Libunao	1840	Calixto Limpingco	1879	
Andres Bondoc	1779		Lorenzo Ligon	1810	Pedro Ligon	1841	Juan de Guzman	1880	
Pablo Bondoc	1780		Baltazar Pangilinan	1811	Domingo Pangilinan	1842	Francisco Villarica	1881	1882
Alejandro Dantis	1781		Canuto Dantis	1812	Nicolas Libunao	1843	Potenciano Buencamino	1883	1885
Juan Fernando	1782		Lorenzo Yambot	1813	Tomas Tecson	1844	Valentin Viola	1886	
Alejandro Maniquis	1783		Clemente Ligon	1814	Juan Siojo	1845	Jose Santiago	1887	
Miguel Ventura	1784		Vicente Tecson	1815	Felipe Gonzales	1846	Evaristo Siojo	1888	
Andres Patiag	1785		Pablo Ventura	1816	Mariano P. Joson	1847	Bartolome Viola	1889	
Miguel Maniquis	1786		Pantaleon Ligon	1817	Victor Buencamino	1848	Simon Tecson	1890	
Domingo Libunao	1787		Vicente Dasig	1818	Fulgencio Santiago	1849	Simon Santiago	1891	
Domingo Santa MAria	1788		Blas Maniquis	1819	Vicente Felix	1850	Jose de Leon	1892	
Francisco Tecson	1789		Dionisio Fernando	1820	Rufino San Gabriel	1851	Bartolome Viola	1893	
Marcos Zapala	1790		Jacinto Santiago	1821	Eugenio Dantis	1852	Lucio Maniquis	1894	
Miguel Quiambao	1791		Manuel Bantog	1822	Tranquilino Gabriel	1853	Ciriaco Libunao	1895	
Andres Bantog	1792		Narciso Macapagal	1823	Victor Buencamino	1854	Simon T. Libunao	1896	
Teodoro Tuazon	1793		Mariano delos Santos	1824	Catalino Ligon	1855	Gregorio Marquez	1897	
Miguel Morales	1794		Lorenzo Tecson	1825	Juan Siojo	1856	Simon Tecson	1898	1899
Tibursio Sayson	1795		Lorenzo Ligon	1826	Tibursio Tecson	1857	Jose Buencamino	1900	
							Teodoro Lim	1900	

=== List of chief executives ===
Name	Term		Notes
Municipal President
Meliton Carlos	1901	1903	
Damaso Sempio	1903	1905	
Mariano Tecson	1906	1908	
Miguel Siojo	1908	1912	
Serafin Tecson	1912	1916	
Catalino Sevilla	1916	1919	
Juan Buencamino Sr.	1919	1922	
Jose Ligon	1922	1925	
Eugenio Tecson	1925	1928	
Regino Sevilla	1928	1931	
Moises V. Ligon	1931	1934	
Municipal Mayor
Florentino C. Viola	1934	1938	
Regino Sevilla	1938	1940	
Eugenio Tecson	1941	1944	
Rafael Roura Luis Santa Maria Eugenio Tecson Manuel V. Fernando	1945		Appointed as Alcalde during Philippine Liberation
Eugenio Tecson	1945	1951	Remained in position after World War II
Conrado S. Pascual	1952	1955	
Felipe V. Buencamino	1956	1963	
Benjamin S. Payawal	1963	1967	
Felix M. Tayag	1964	1967	
Marcelo Aure	1968	1979	Appointed as Municipal Mayor during Martial Law (Bagong Lipunan) era from 1976 - 1979
Juan F. Dela Cruz	1979	1986	Municipal Mayor during Martial Law (Bagong Lipunan) era
Manuel Lipana	1986	1987	Transitional Municipal Government during 1987 Referendum
Fernando B. Mendez Sr.	1988	1995	
Santiago C. Sevilla	1995	2004	
Edmundo Jose "Pop" T. Buencamino	2004	2006	Term not finished; suspended due to his case in Sandiganbayan.
Roderick DG. Tiongson	2006	2016	Vice Mayor during "Pop" Buencamino's term; sworn into office as Acting Mayor from 2006 - 2007
Marivee Mendez - Coronel	2016	2019	First Female Mayor of San Miguel, Bulacan
Roderick DG. Tiongson	2019	2025	Roderick Tiongson's 2nd Run as Municipal Mayor

== Education ==
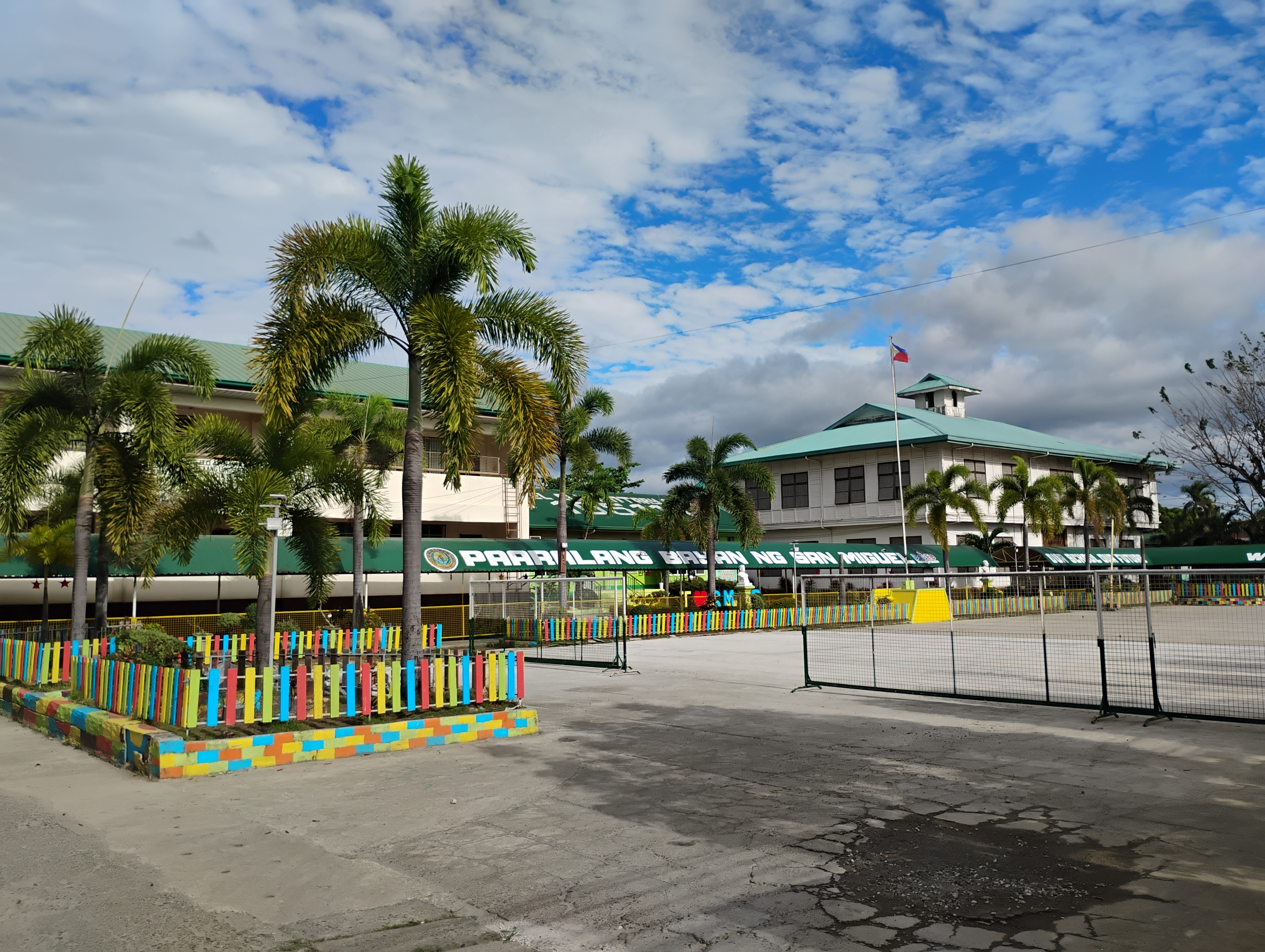
San Miguel Elementary School

San Miguel is served by an extensive network of educational institutions at the elementary, secondary, and tertiary levels. The municipality is home to numerous public and private schools, along with institutions for technical and higher education.

There are two schools district offices which govern all educational institutions within the municipality. They oversee the management and operations of all private and public, from primary to secondary schools. These are San Miguel North District Office, and San Miguel South District Office.

=== Primary and elementary schools ===
- Bagong Pag-Asa Elementary School
- Bagong Silang Elementary School
- Balaong Elementary School
- Balite Elementary School
- Bantog Elementary School
- Bardias Elementary School
- Batasan Elementary School
- Biak Na Bato Elementary School
- Biclat Elementary School
- Buga Elementary School
- Buliran Elementary School
- Bulualto Elementary School
- Calumpang Elementary School
- D. C. Nicolas Sr. School
- Don Felix De Leon Memorial School
- Doña Narcisa B. Vda. De Leon Elementary School
- Dr. Juan F. Pascual Memorial School
- God's Love Children's Advancement Center
- Ilog Bulo Primary School
- Kng. Kabayo Elementary School
- Labne Elementary School
- Lambakin Elementary School
- Magmarale Elementary School
- Malibay Elementary School
- Maligaya Elementary School
- Malinao Elementary School
- Mandile Elementary School
- Masalipit Elementary School
- Pacalag Elementary School
- Paliwasan Elementary School
- Pangarayuman Elementary School
- Park Ridge School of Montesori
- Partida Elementary School
- Pinambaran Elementary School
- Pulong Bayabas Elementary School
- Pulong Duhat Primary School
- Sacdalan Elementary School
- Salacot Elementary School
- San Jose Elementary School
- San Juan Elementary School
- San Miguel Elementary School
- San Miguel North Central School
- San Vicente Elementary School
- Sapang Elementary School
- School of Mount St. Mary
- Sibul Elementary School
- Sta. Ines Elementary School
- Sta. Lucia Elementary School
- Sta. Rita Elementary School
- Tartaro Elementary School
- Tibagan Elementary School
- VOJ Eastgate Christian Academy of Bulacan
- Waminal Achievers Academy

=== Secondary schools ===
- Emilia Perez Ligon High School
- John J. Russell Memorial High School
- Partida High School
- San Miguel National High School
- Vedasto R. Santiago High School

=== Higher educational institutions ===
- Bulacan Polytechnic College
- Microlink Institute of Science and Technology
- St. Paul University

== Notable people ==
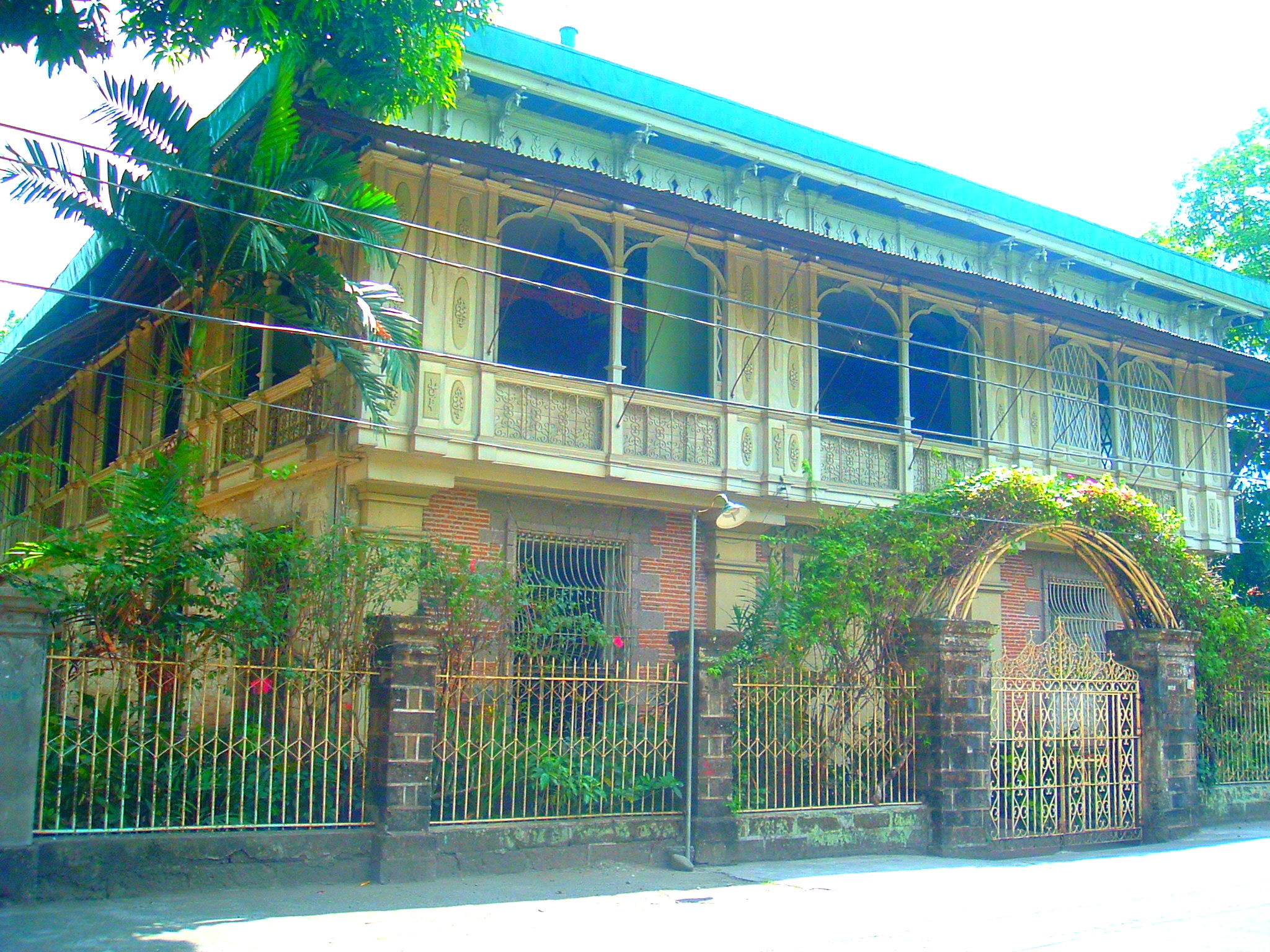
Tecson House - The house where Emilio Aguinaldo slept before he departed to Pangasinan. The house of Simon Tecson

- Nicanor Abelardo - Kundiman composer.
- Virgilio S. Almario - National Artist for Literature. Poet, critic, translator, editor, teacher, cultural manager, and the founder of Adarna House.
- Felipe Buencamino - Former Secretary of Foreign Affairs and one of the founders of Iglesia Filipina Independiente. One of the authors of the Malolos Constitution
- Alfredo Lim – Former Philippine Senator, then Mayor of Manila and former Director of the National Bureau of Investigation.
- Pablo Tecson – Former Governor General of Bulacan and later served as Insular Secretary of the Philippine Bureau of Agriculture.
- Trinidad Tecson – One of the renowned female revolutionaries of the Philippine Revolution. Known as the Mother of Biak-na-Bato. Also known as 'The Mother of Philippine Red Cross' and 'Mother of Mercy'.
- Maximo Viola - Doctor, revolutionary, and initial financier of the publication of Jose Rizal's novel Noli me tangere (novel)
- Carlos A. Santos-Viola – Filipino architect. Best known for designing and building churches for the Iglesia ni Cristo religious group.
- Narcisa de Leon - One of the founders of LVN Pictures, one of the biggest film studios in the history of Philippine Cinema
- Magtanggol C. Gunigundo - chairman, Presidential Commission on Good Government (PCGG) from 1992 to 1998; and Constitutional Convention Delegate representing the 2nd District of Bulacan, 1971 Constitutional Convention
- Luz Ocampo - pabalat artisan
