= Advertising and marketing controversies in the Philippines =

This article lists advertising and marketing controversies in the Philippines. It includes media such as television commercials, print media, and branding that have been the subject of controversy as well as controversies arising from relevant methods such as sales promotions.

== List ==
Campaign	Year	Type	Brand	Advertising agency	Description	Controversy summary	Ref.
Pepsi Number Fever	1992	Consumer sales promotion	PepsiCo products		PepsiCo encouraged sales of its soda products through a sales promotion. In 1992, it announced that it would print numbers ranging from 001 to 999 inside the caps of its bottled soda products. Certain numbers, announced through television, could be redeemed for prizes, ranging from ₱100 to ₱1 million.	On May 25, 1992, the winning number for the grand prize of ₱1 million was announced to be 349. 800,000 regular bottle caps instead of two were mistakenly printed with the 349 number. However, PepsiCo refused to dispense the full prize to all holders of the 349 cap. This led to riots and lawsuits against the company.	
Dada	2002	Television advertisement	McDonald's	Leo Burnett Manila	A little girl is asked by her father who her favorite parent is. She says that her favorite parent is her father, in exchange for French fries given to her by her father.	There were protests in the Senate of the Philippines against the ad as it promoted a culture of corruption which was against Filipino values. McDonald's later withdrew the airing of the said advertisement.	
Nakatikim ka na ba ng kinse años	2004	Billboard	Napoleon Quince (Destileria Limtuaco)	Singson Lascano Group	An advertisement with an image of the alcoholic beverage Napoleon Quince accompanied by the copy "Nakatikim ka na ba ng kinse años" (lit. 'Have you tasted a 15 year old')	The advertisement was criticized for the perceived double entendre of its tagline suggesting child abuse. "Kinse años" was perceived to be a reference to the body of a fifteen year old minor and the tagline as a whole as encouraging child sexual abuse. Gabriela campaigned for the removal of the ad while a group of child activists and lawyers filed a lawsuit against Destileria Limtuaco, which also filed an earlier lawsuit against the Advertising Board of the Philippines for its order to pull out materials for the kinse años campaign.	
Spelling Bee	2009	Television advertisement	LBC Remittance Service (LBC Express)	Aspac	A child participates in a spelling bee competition. The contestant host, portrayed by Edu Manzano, asked for the correct spelling for "remittance" and the child answered "L-B-C" after the initials of the courier company LBC Express. The answer was declared to be "correct".	Department of Education Secretary Jesli Lapus took notice of the advertisement and was critical to the approach made for the material. He believed that ad causes confusion to children and that the material mitigates the efforts of his department to "improve the quality of education". The Congressional Spouses Foundation, Inc. also requested the Advertising Board of the Philippines and the Movie and Television Review and Classification Board to stop broadcast of the television commercial. LBC Express pulled out the ad but insisted that it met standards set by the Ad Standards Council.	
Pilipinas Kay Ganda	2010	Tagline/Logo	Philippine Tourism (Department of Tourism)	Campaigns & Grey	Tagline for a tourism campaign to promote the Philippines that contains a "cartoony" logo	The tagline's logo was alleged to be plagiarized from Poland's Polska tourism campaign. Campaigns & Grey said that the campaign and logo were released prematurely.	
BF-GF	2011	Television advertisement	McDonald's	Leo Burnett Manila	An adopted McDonald's campaign for India in which its commercial features two children. A girl asks a boy if she is already his girlfriend. The boy says that he is not yet ready to be in such kind of a relationship. The girl clarifies that what she really wants is french fries.	The Catholic Bishops' Conference of the Philippines criticized the advertisement's portrayal of courtship. The religious organization believed that the advertisement wanted to send a message that McDonald's french fries are cheap, consequentially equating french fries as having the same value as that of a human relationship. McDonald's stopped further broadcast of the commercial in television but it remained available online. The advertisement became one of the most shared videos in 2011 according to Unruly Media's Viral Video Chart with 750,000 shares by the end of November of that year.	
Lapu-Lapu	2013	Television advertisement	EQ Plus	McCann Philippines	A 30-second commercial that spoofs Portuguese explorer Ferdinand Magellan offering a box of baby diapers as a gift to the ruler of Mactan, Lapulapu and his wife as a token of friendship. However, Lapulapu's wife objected, believing that the diapers offered by Magellan were of low quality, instead presenting EQ Plus diapers. As a result, Lapulapu challenged Magellan to a fight, resulting in the Battle of Mactan.	The commercial was controversial nationwide, particularly from the local government of Lapu-Lapu City, with its then-mayor Paz Radaza demanding that the commercial be pulled out as a "grave insult" to their residents and to Filipinos "in general". Radaza also claimed that she had heard of children considering the commercial as "a true reflection of history". Several online petitions were also started, requesting the commercial to be taken down. Within the month, a cease and desist order was issued by the National Historical Commission of the Philippines, resulting in the commercial being recalled by the Ad Standards Council.	
#ChickenSad	2014	Social media post	KFC	Ogilvy Philippines	A graphic of a piece of fried chicken with a sad face accompanied by the hashtag #ChickenSad	Jollibee had to close some of its stores due to the unavailability of its menu items including its signature dish Chickenjoy due to an apparent supply shortage. It was later clarified to be due to a major systems upgrade. As a response, KFC made a social media post suggesting that Jollibee wasn't the only fast food restaurant offering fried chicken and presented itself as an alternative. The ad had mixed reception and was later pulled out.	
Love All Kinds of Love	2015	Billboard	Bench		Billboards installed at EDSA–Guadalupe featured a male same-sex couple holding hands	Bench's ad was subject to controversy after the ad was apparently defaced by black paint, covering the couple's holding hands. Bench released a statement that the ad was not vandalized and the hands were intentionally blackened to comply with the standards set by the Ad Standards Council, after the uncensored version was rejected due to being contrary to "traditional Filipino family values". Bench explained that it had earlier released a mockup with the uncensored billboard online, which it said might have caused the confusion.	
Sights	2017	Television advertisement	Philippine Tourism (Department of Tourism)	McCann Philippines	Meant to promote the Philippines as a destination for foreign retirees. The advertisement featured Japanese retiree M. Uchimura interacting with Filipinos in various tourist spots such as the Hundred Islands of Pangasinan, the rice terraces of Ifugao, the sand dunes of Paoay, and the heritage houses of Vigan. The ad concludes with a reveal that Uchimura is blind.	The ad was alleged to be plagiarized from a South African tourism campaign by Brand South Africa. McCann claimed responsibility for the ad but insisted that there was no intention to plagiarize, pointing out that the ad as was based on the experience of a real foreign retiree. The Department of Tourism stood by the ad agency and said that the ad would not be pulled out or edited.	
Pandemic Effect	2021	Television advertisement	Belo Medical Group	Gigil	The commercial featured a woman gaining weight, growing body hair, and getting acne as she watches a stream of bad news amidst the COVID-19 pandemic.	The advertisement mostly received negative reception due to its "insensitive" portrayal of the challenges women deals with during the pandemic. Gigil and the Belo Medical Group publicly apologized for the ad. Vicki Belo, her son Quark Henares and her husband Hayden Kho were hesitant to approve the advertisement expressing concern that it might convey a message of body shaming. Henares also alleged that Gigil initially wanted to keep the advertisement despite the backlash. The Association of Accredited Advertising Agencies of the Philippines (4As) also suspended Gigil's association membership for a year as a response.	
B.M.T Sandwich	2023	Online advertisement	Subway Philippines		In January 2023, Subway Philippines launched an online commercial on their Facebook page promoting their new B.M.T (Biggest, Meatiest, Tastiest) sandwiches. The digital campaign portrays social media influencer Kimpoy Feliciano as a "lover boy" who is infatuated with three women named B, M, and T. The commercial later reveals that these women are metaphors for the different flavors of the sandwiches.	The ad was strongly criticized online as "disturbing, objectifying, and misogynstic". The Gabriela Women's Party also released a statement condemning the ad as sexist and deeply offensive to victims of sexual violence and abuse. The ad was eventually taken down and Subway Philippines released a statement, which was further criticized online as a non-apology apology as the company did not acknowledge the issue and merely "reiterated the B.M.T message". The statement was also eventually taken down and followed up with a new statement apologizing for the commercial, with the company stating that the ad "did not reflect our values of dignity and respect [and] shouldn't have been produced".	
Love the Philippines	2023	Launch video	Philippine Tourism (Department of Tourism)	DDB Philippines	The Department of Tourism looked for a replacement tourism campaign for It's More Fun in the Philippines!, which was adopted in 2012. The new campaign was launched on June 27, 2023, and was accompanied by a launch video which was supposed to showcase various tourist destinations in the Philippines.	The launch video for the campaign sparked outrage from the Internet when it was discovered to include stock footage of foreign tourist destinations of Brazil, Indonesia, Switzerland, Thailand, and the United Arab Emirates. DDB Philippines apologized for the oversight. However, the DOT still canceled its contract with DDB.	
Gil Tulog	2024	Guerrilla advertising	Wellspring	Gigil	In July 2024, street signs for Gil Puyat Avenue (formerly and popularly known as Buendia Avenue) in Makati were replaced with official-looking signs that read "Gil Tulog Avenue (formerly Gil Puyat Avenue)", as a pun on the Tagalog words puyat (meaning "sleepless") and tulog (meaning "asleep"), as a marketing stunt for Wellspring sleep supplements.	The family of former senator Gil Puyat filed a complaint against Gigil, with Victor Puyat, Gil's son, calling the advertising agency's activity as "disrespect to my father Sen. Gil J. Puyat and to our family". It is also alleged that Makati mayor Abby Binay was unaware of said stunt, asking that the modified signs be taken down.	
Burger Blowout	2025	Consumer sales promotion	Jollibee / Coke Studio Philippines	—	For every purchase of select Jollibee meals customers gain a raffle entry for a chance to win various prizes including food products and concert tickets.	On Week 3, Jollibee published the list of winners which many suspected to be AI-generated. Jollibee blamed "fraudulent third parties" for the incident and organized a re-draw of the Week 3 winners.	
