= International tourism advertising =

Tourism-related marketing

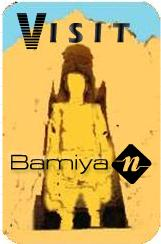
VisitBamiyan was created in August 2009 to market Bamiyan to the rest of the world.

International tourism advertising is tourism-related marketing on the part of a private or public entity directed towards audiences abroad, and might target potential travelers and non-travelers alike. Wholly private firms such as travel agencies, hotel chains, cruise agencies, non-governmental organizations (NGOs) often run their own advertising campaigns to market their existence, mission, or services and/or goods offered to the consumer, and these advertisements seldom carry intentional political messages.

On the other hand, advertising distributed by governments themselves, such as through tourism ministries or government-owned private sector enterprises, is sometimes intended to convey more than simply the value of the product, service, or experience; governments can use tourism ads as a channel for communicating directly to the public of other countries because tourism is a common and internationally encouraged industry and the advertising of it is subject to minimal content regulation.

As the global travel market continues to expand with yearly increasing flights among international destinations, advertising efforts on the part of the major actors in this market are also increasing. Advertising campaigns to promote travel to destinations abroad are particularly prevalent in western countries where the general public's expenditures on tourism tend to be consistently high, even in light of the economic recession.

Many advertisers, which include both private entities and foreign governments themselves, share the intended goal of increasing their own revenue by popularizing their service (e.g., airline or hotel chain) or destination to boost receipts from travelers; however, some travel campaigns have additional or alternative purposes, such as promoting good public sentiments or improving existing ones towards them among the target audience. Sometimes, states may use the branding of a product or service, itself, as a means of conveying a specific message without explicitly stating the message; this tactic is often used to soften the implied message itself, thus allowing the brander to sidestep or minimize controversy and/or opposition.

== Types ==
Tourism advertising can take many forms, utilize a wide array of advertising tactics, and be driven by a scope of private or public intents. Destination advertising is designed to make a location itself seem more appealing, while travel services advertising seeks to gain an audience's buy-in for the tourism-related service or product. Below are some instances of international tourism advertising overlapping with states' political, economic, and/or social interests.

=== Destination advertising ===
A great degree of ads promoting foreign countries are produced and distributed by the tourism ministries of those countries, so these ads often serve as vehicles for political statements and/or depictions of the destination country's desired foreign public perception(s). Following are only a few of the many examples of government-produced tourism destination advertising that also serve political or social functions.

==== Bahamas ====
The Bahamas are commonly considered to be a focal point of leisure and recreational travel in the Caribbean and the island nation advertises itself as such. Television ads and website produced by the government of the Bahamas specifically foster the image of the islands providing a care-free, exciting, culturally rich, and even romantic experience for travelers; a recent slogan for the marketing campaign was "It's better in the Bahamas" to reinforce the contrast between the desired perception as a low-stress getaway and the hectic nature of whatever living environment tourists would be leaving behind. The Bahamas have, however, actually traditionally seen high violent crime rates, so the tourism marketing attempts to focus the audience's attention on the azure water and beaches and draw it away from any negative elements of life there. Managing perceptions is a common part of advertising of many consumer products and services, focusing the audience's mind solely on the desirable aspects of whatever is being sold and away from any possible drawbacks or consequences.

==== India ====
The common impression of India in the West has long been either negative—including perceptions of widespread poverty, lack of sophisticated hygiene, and violent ethnic and religious clashes—or ambivalent, so the Indian government's Ministry of Tourism began a marketing campaign, "Incredible !ndia," to emphasize the country's rich culture, historic sites, tourist attractions, and general sense of excitement and dynamism to western audiences. Tourism is an extremely lucrative and growing global industry so it is no surprise that India, a developing nation, is striving to capitalize on that market to boost its economy. In addition, India is also looking to strengthen its international security and diplomatic ties while broadening and deepening its trade relationships, especially with the U.S., so it is in India's interest to promote a positive light for itself among the American and western voting populations in order to garner future international support and aid.

==== Kazakhstan ====
After the 2006 release of the Sacha Baron Cohen comedy Borat, which depicts a politically incorrect and socially oblivious fictional Kazakhi reporter who travels throughout the United States interviewing and meeting Americans from various walks of life, the government of Kazakhstan was highly offended by the depiction of its less than two-decade-old country and criticized the film and its creator as being defamatory and slanderous. The issue of preserving Kazakhstan's public image in light of the movie was of such high importance that Kazakh President Nursultan Nazarbayev had it listed as a main issue when he traveled to the U.S. in September 2006 to meet with then-President George W. Bush. Coupled with Nazarbeyev's visit, according to Kazakhstan embassy spokesman Roman Vassilenko, the Kazakh government staged a large-scale public relations "blitz," including "running four-page ads in The New York Times and U.S. News and World Report and commercials on CNN and the local ABC affiliate in Washington, D.C.", as well as launching TV ads to promote tourism to Kazakhstan. These travel ads specifically featured cultural and historical features of the country as well as views of its developed infrastructure, specifically to counter the type of impression given by the Borat character to the West that Kazakhstan is socially and physically underdeveloped.

==== Mexico ====
Recently in 2010 the Tourism Board of Mexico, a public office that aggregates the resources and interests of the federal, state, and municipal governments, launched a tourism advertising campaign in the United States and Canada—Mexico's two North American Free Trade Agreement (NAFTA) partners—geared towards renovating common public political and social perceptions of Mexico, including impressions of poverty, government and law enforcement corruption, petty and organized crime and drug trading, and illegal immigration into the U.S.; the new campaign's purpose is expressly demonstrated by its marketing slogan, "Mexico, the place you thought you knew." The print and television ads feature views of Mexico's beaches, natural wonders, cultural festivities, and historical artifacts like Mayan pyramids and Spanish churches in order to provide a counterbalance to the less preferable popular preconceptions. The Tourism Board's stated goal of the advertising surge is to "generat[e] more than three [positive] impressions per person" among the North American audience. The eventual goal is likely to increase tourism revenue for the country, but, for now, the Tourism Board is focusing on managing perceptions among the general populations of Mexico's two major neighboring trade partners.

==== Destination slogans ====
Many countries use slogans in their international tourism advertising. Destination slogans aim to promote a positive identity for the country. Academic studies of these slogans have identified several common themes such as the physical beauty of the location or the positive experiences travellers can expect to have there.

Country	Slogan
Albania	Go your own way!
Algeria	Tourism for everybody
Andorra	The Pyrenean Country
Antigua and Barbuda	The beach is just the beginning
Argentina	Beats to your rhythm
Armenia	Visit Armenia, It is Beautiful
Australia	There's NOTHING like Australia
Austria	Arrive and revive
Bahamas	Life Is Grand
Bahrain	Ours. Yours. Bahrain
Bangladesh	Beautiful Bangladesh
Barbados	Brilliant Barbados
Belarus	Hospitality Beyond Borders
Belgium	The place to be
Belize	Mother Nature's Best-Kept Secret
Bhutan	Happiness is a place
Bolivia	Bolivia awaits you
Bosnia and Herzegovina	The heart shaped land
Botswana	Our pride, your destination
Brazil	Brasil – sensational!
Brunei Darussalam	A kingdom of unexpected treasures
Bulgaria	A discovery to share
Burundi	Beautiful Burundi
Cabo Verde	No stress
Cambodia	Kingdom of Wonder
Cameroon	All of Africa in one country
Canada	Keep exploring
Chad	Oasis of the Sahel
Chile	All are welcome
China	China Like Never Before
Colombia	The Only Risk Is Wanting To Stay (2008) Colombia is magical realism (2016)
Costa Rica	Essential Costa Rica
Croatia	Full of life
Cuba	Autentica Cuba (2010)
Cyprus	Cyprus in your heart
Czech Republic	Land of stories
Denmark	Happiest place on Earth!
Djibouti	Djibeauty
Dominica	The nature island
Dominican Republic	Dominican Republic has it all
Ecuador	All you need is Ecuador
Egypt	Where it all begins
El Salvador	The 45 Minute Country
Estonia	Epic Estonia
Eswatini	A royal experience
Ethiopia	Land of origins
Fiji	Where Happiness Finds You
Finland	I wish I was in Finland
France	Rendez vous en France
Gambia	The smiling coast of Africa
Georgia	For the best moments of your life
Germany	Simply inspiring
Greece	All Time Classic
Grenada	Pure Grenada
Guatemala	Heart of the Mayan World (2011)
Guyana	South America Undiscovered
Haiti	Experience It!
Honduras	Everything is here (2008)
Hungary	Think Hungary more than expected
Iceland	Inspired by Iceland
India	Incredible !ndia (2002)
Indonesia	Wonderful Indonesia
Iran	You Are Invited
Iraq	The Other Iraq (Kurdistan)
Ireland	Jump into Ireland (2012)
Israel	Land of Creation
Italy	Made in Italy
Jamaica	Get All Right
Japan	Endless discovery
Jordan	Yes, it's Jordan
Kazakhstan	The land of wonders
Kenya	Magical Kenya
Kiribati	For travellers
Kyrgyzstan	Oasis on the Great Silk Road
Laos	Simply Beautiful
Latvia	Best enjoyed slowly Magnetic Latvia
Lebanon	Lebanon Passion for Living
Lesotho	The Kingdom In The Sky
Liechtenstein	Experience princely moments
Lithuania	See it! Feel it! Love it! Real is Beautiful (2017)
Luxembourg	Live your unexpected Luxembourg
Madagascar	A genuine island, a world apart
Malawi	The warm heart of Africa
Malaysia	Malaysia Truly Asia
Maldives	The sunny side of life
Malta	Truly Mediterranean
Mauritius	It's a pleasure
Mexico	Live It to Believe It
Micronesia (Federated States of)	Experience the warmth
Monaco	Easy going Monaco
Moldova	Discover the routes of life
Mongolia	“Go Nomadic, Experience Mongolia (2013) Mongolia - Nomadic by Nature (2014)
Montenegro	Wild Beauty
Morocco	Much mor
Mozambique	Come to where it all started
Myanmar	Let the journey begin
Namibia	Endless horizons
Nepal	Once is not enough
Netherlands	The original cool (2013)
New Zealand	100% Pure
Nicaragua	Unica. Original!
Nigeria	Good people, great nation
North Macedonia	North Macedonia Timeless
Norway	Powered by nature
Oman	Beauty has an address (2010)
Pakistan	It's beautiful, it's Pakistan
Palau	Pristime Paradise Palau
Panama	Panama Surprises
Papua New Guinea	A million different journeys
Paraguay	You have to feel it!
Peru	Land of the Incas
Philippines	Wow Philippines (2002–2010); It's more fun in the Philippines (2012–2023); Love the Philippines (2023–present)
Poland	Move your imagination
Portugal	Europe's West Coast
Qatar	Where dreams come to life
Romania	Explore the Carpathian garden
Russian Federation	Reveal your own Russia
Rwanda	Remarkable Rwanda (2014)
Saint Kitts and Nevis	Follow your heart
Saint Lucia	Simply beautiful
Saint Vincent and the Grenadines	Discover SVG
Samoa	Beautiful Samoa
San Marino	San Marino For All
Saudi Arabia	Experience to discover
Serbia	My Serbia
Seychelles	Another world
Sierra Leone	The freedom to explore
Singapore	Your Singapore
Slovakia	Travel in Slovakia - Good idea
Slovenia	I feel SLOVEnia
Solomon Islands	Seek the unexplored
South Africa	Inspiring new ways
South Korea	Imagine your Korea
Spain	#spainindetail
Sri Lanka	Sri Lanka Small Miracle (2009) Refreshingly Sri Lanka... the Wonder of Asia (2011) Wonder of Asia (2014)
Suriname	A Colorful Experience... Exotic beyond words
Switzerland	Get natural
Syrian Arab Republic	Always Beautiful
Tajikistan	Feel the friendship
Tanzania	The land of Kilimanjaro, Zanzibar and the Serengeti
Thailand	Amazing Thailand
Timor-Leste	Being first has its rewards
Tonga	The true South Pacific
Trinidad and Tobago	The true Caribbean
Tunisia	I feel like Tunisia
Turkey	Be our guest
Tuvalu	Timeless Tuvalu
Uganda	You're welcome
Ukraine	It's all about U
United Arab Emirates	Discover all that's possible
United Kingdom	UKOK (2002) GREAT Britain - Home of amazing moments (2016-)
United States of America	All within your reach
Uruguay	Uruguay natural
Uzbekistan	Naturally Irresistible!
Vanuatu	Discover what matters
Venezuela	Venezuela is your destination!
Vietnam	Timeless charm
Zambia	Let's explore
Zimbabwe	A world of wonders

=== Travel services advertising ===
Additionally, a wide range of foreign airlines and travel-related services which also advertise separately from the destinations, themselves, are owned by their respective governments, such as the Emirates airline (Dubai) and Qatar Airways (Qatar).

==== Emirates ====
Through advertising for the Emirates airline, one of the major themes that Dubai promotes is its evolving status as a geographic and economic player in the Middle East. Emirates advertising describes Dubai as "the perfect hub for an expanding global network" and illustrates this claim in the airline's "Centre of the World" television ad. On the other hand, Dubai subtly promotes an official stance of multinationalism and a stated intent to cater to the comfort of travelers from abroad in the Emirates' "Multinational Cabin Crew" television ad. These positions, among others, are portrayed via visually and audibly appealing commercials which are designed to relate to the target audience(s) and make the ads' messages maximally amenable to global viewers. Emirates additionally adds to its effort to appeal to the West through its sponsorship of the Arsenal Football Club, including constructing the team's new venue, Emirates Stadium, which opened in July 2006 and prominently displays the Emirates branding on the exterior; in this way, any depictions of the stadium will result in de facto advertising and reinforce the public recognition of the Emirates company as one that is associated with western sports and culture. In May 2013 three Arsenal players, Kieran Gibbs, Alex Oxlade-Chamberlain and Carl Jenkinson took an A380 flight simulator challenge. Swapping their usual airline passenger seats and stepping into the cockpit, the players attempted to land an A380 in Dubai.

Emirates, along with the aviation services company Dnata, is owned by the parent company The Emirates Group which, in turn, is wholly owned by the Government of Dubai. The chairman and CEO of The Emirates Group, Sheikh Ahmed Bin Saeed Al Maktoum, is the younger brother of the former ruler of Dubai, Sheikh Rashid Bin Saeed Al Maktoum, and uncle of the current ruler, Sheikh Mohammed Bin Rashid Al Maktoum. In 1985, Sheikh Ahmed was appointed President of the Dubai Department of Civil Aviation (DCA), the governing body for airline regulation and airport control and operation. The DCA was restructured and expanded in 2007, thus creating the Dubai Civil Aviation Authority (DCAA) which has since been the airline regulatory authority in the Emirate and the Dubai Airports company which owns and operates Dubai's airports, Dubai International and the currently under-construction Dubai World Central – Al Maktoum International. Dubai International (IATA: DXB) is a primary international hub in the Middle East, offering flights to every continent except Antarctica. As of November 2010, DXB is the 6th busiest airport in the world for cargo traffic, and the 14th highest passenger throughput of all international airports.

Sheikh Ahmed currently simultaneously holds the positions of chairman and CEO of Emirates Airline & Group, which includes the Emirates airline and Dnata air services company, Chairman of the Dubai Airports company, and President of the Dubai Civil Aviation Authority. Because Dubai's government leadership is directly involved and intertwined with private-sector enterprises, including the Emirates airline and many other facets of the tourism industry, the government there necessarily has a vested interest in the public perception of Dubai.
