= Comparative advertising =

Type of advertising

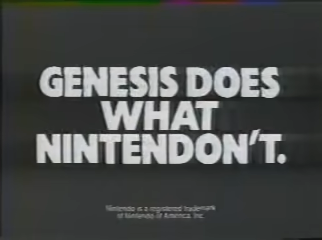
Screenshot from a late 1980s Sega Genesis commercial directly attacking video game industry competitor Nintendo by name with a mocking, pun-based slogan.

Comparative advertising, or combative advertising, is an advertisement in which a particular product, or service, specifically mentions a competitor by name for the express purpose of showing why the competitor is inferior to the product naming it. Also referred to as "knocking copy", it is loosely defined as advertising where "the advertised brand is explicitly compared with one or more competing brands and the comparison is obvious to the audience". An advertising war is said to be occurring when competing products or services exchange comparative or combative advertisements mentioning each other.

This should not be confused with parody advertisements, where a fictional product is being advertised for the purpose of poking fun at the particular advertisement, nor should it be confused with the use of a coined brand name for the purpose of comparing the product without actually naming an actual competitor. ("Wikipedia tastes better and is less filling than the Encyclopedia Galactica.")

In the United States, the Federal Trade Commission (FTC) defined comparative advertising as "advertisement that compares alternative brands on objectively measurable attributes or price, and identifies the alternative brand by name, illustration or other distinctive information". This definition was used in the case Gillette Australia Pty Ltd v Energizer Australia Pty Ltd. Similarly, the Law Council of Australia recently suggested that comparative advertising refers to "advertising which include reference to a competitor's trademark in a way which does not impute proprietorship in the mark to the advertiser".

Comparative advertisements could be either indirectly or directly comparative, positive or negative, and seeks "to associate or differentiate the two competing brands". Different countries apply differing views regarding the laws on comparative advertising.

== History ==
The earliest court case concerning comparative advertising dates back to 1910 in the United States – Saxlehner v Wagner. Prior to the 1970s, comparative advertising was deemed unfeasible due to related risks. For instance, comparative advertising could invite misidentification of products, potential legal issues, and might even win public sympathy for their competitors as victims.

In 1972, the FTC began to encourage advertisers to make comparison with named competitors, with the broad, public welfare objective of creating more informative advertising. The FTC argued that this form of advertising could also stimulate comparison shopping, encourage product improvement and innovation, and foster a positive competitive environment. However, studies have shown that while comparative advertisements had increased since 1960, the relative amount of comparative advertising is still small.

== Legal issues ==
=== Argentina ===
In Argentina, there is no specific statute dealing with comparative advertising (so it is not forbidden), but there are clear jurisprudential rules based on unfair competition law. If in some manner an advertisement is proven to be unfair or exceeds ethical standards by hiding the truth or omitting some essential aspect of the comparison, it is probable that an injunction will be granted and that the plaintiff will be able to obtain a final decision declaring the advertising illegal.

Numerous cases follow international precedent in referring to the requirements of the European Union Directive on comparative advertising. By following these criteria, Argentine courts have developed standards very similar to European regulation. It is as if the judges wanted to validate the law created by the Courts with an external source. Similar conclusions reached elsewhere indicate the existence of universally accepted principles that accept that comparing products in commercial advertisements should be lawful.

=== Australia ===
In Australia, no specific law governs comparative advertising although certain cases regarding this matter have occurred. Comparative advertising that is truthful, and does not lead to confusion is permitted.

Generally, Australian advertisers should make sure that the following are complied when exercising comparative advertising to avoid breaches regarding misleading advertising under Australia Consumer Law:

1. Product compared should be like products as per HCF Australia Ltd v Switzerland Australia Health Fund Pty Ltd, or else comparison must be made clearly to consumers as per Gillette Australia Pty Ltd v Energizer Australia Pty Ltd;
2. Test results are presented as it is as per Makita v Black & Decker;
3. Test used are appropriate and conducted according to industry guidelines as per Duracell Australia Pty Ltd v Union Carbide Australia Ltd; and
4. Mock up test results truly reflects how is product functioning in real life as per Hoover (Australia) Pty Ltd v Email Ltd.

=== Brazil ===
In Brazil, the Brazilian Advertising Self-Regulation Code allow comparative advertising with certain restrictions. Its primary purpose shall be the clarification or consumer's protection; it shall have as basic principle the objectiveness of the comparison since subjective data, psychological or emotionally based data does not constitute a valid comparison basis for consumers; the purposed or implemented comparison shall be capable of being supported by evidence; in the case of consumption goods, the comparison shall be made with models manufactured in the same year and no comparison shall be made between products manufactured in different years, unless it is only a reference to show evolution, in which case the evolution shall be clearly demonstrated; there shall be no confusion between the products and competitor's brands; there shall be no unfair competition, denigration of the product's image or another company's product; and there shall be no unreasonable use of the corporate image or goodwill of third parties.

Likewise, the majority of the Brazilian authors is inclined to say that its legitimacy depends to meet certain requirements, which, in general, would be stipulated by Article 3a of Directive 84/450/EEC

In an early Mercosur's rules through Resolution 126/96.

=== European Union ===
Prior to 1997, many European countries severely limited comparative claims as an advertising practice. For example, in Germany comparisons in advertising had since the 1930s been largely prohibited as an anti-competitive practice, with very limited exceptions for cases where the advertiser had a good reason for presenting a critical claim, and reference to a competitor was necessary in order to present that claim. Importantly, this only applied to critical claims - claims of equivalence were completely prohibited. A similar approach had been adopted in France, where comparative advertising was commonly seen as disparaging of competitors. However, the legalisation of comparative advertising in France in 1992, opened the door to a general legalisation of comparative advertising through EU law, which had first been proposed by the European Commission in 1978. The result was the adoption of Directive 97/55/EC, which came into force in the year 2000. The relevant provisions are now contained in Directive 2006/114/EC.

This Directive sets out rules that comparative advertising must comply with in order to be considered permissible. These include the requirements that the comparison concern goods and services that meet the same purpose, that it objectively compare the relevant characteristics of the products concerned and that it not cause confusion or denigrate the trademarks and other distinguishing signs of competitors. The Directive prohibits comparisons that take unfair advantage of the reputation of a competitor's distinguishing marks, or present goods or services as imitations of products covered by a protected trade mark or trade name. Additionally, any comparison aimed at promoting goods bearing a protected designation of origin must refer exclusively to other goods bearing the same designation. Directive 2006/114/EC constitutes a total harmonisation of the rules on comparative advertising, meaning that the Member States are neither allowed to permit comparisons that breach the requirements of the Directive, nor prohibit ones that do.

Further, while trademark rights can in principle be used to prevent comparative advertising that makes unauthorised use of a competitor's trademark, this is not the case where the comparative advertisement complies with all the requirements of Directive 2006/114/EC. Legitimate comparative advertising must therefore be seen as an exception to the exclusive rights of the trademark proprietor. However, the trademark proprietor can, thanks to the prohibition on taking unfair advantage of a trademark's reputation, oppose the use of their trademark where it is not aimed at distinguishing the products of the advertiser and trademark proprietor and to highlight their differences objectively, but rather at riding on the coat-tails of that mark in order to benefit from its reputation.

The requirements set out by the Directive have resulted in some controversy. This is particularly true of the per se prohibition on comparisons presenting goods and services as imitations of trademarked products. In this regard, EU law contrasts starkly with the US approach; the US courts have long held that traders are allowed to the trademarked names of products they have imitated in advertising. In contrast, in L'Oréal and others v. Bellure, the Court of Justice held that smell-alike perfumes marketed through comparison lists breached this condition. This decision was criticised both by the English courts and by scholars, who have considered that this places unjustified limits on advertising acts that are otherwise fully legal, such as copying that does not infringe intellectual property rights.

=== Hong Kong ===
The law in Hong Kong regarding comparative advertising is the law that existed in the UK prior to the enactment of the UK Act 1994. Hong Kong has no legislation exclusively intended at limiting false or misleading advertisements. Still, the Trade Descriptions Ordinance (Cap 362) bans the use of false trade descriptions in advertisements. The tort of trade libel also exists to deal with false or misleading advertisements designed to injure the competitor. Consumer Council may have the authority to publish information with a perspective to amending false or misleading advertisements, while the Association of Accredited Advertising Agencies of Hong Kong have the authority to take action against members who organize advertisements that are inaccurate.

=== Philippines ===
The industry self-regulatory body Ad Standards Council permits comparative advertising on certain industries such as automobile but not automotive products, mobile phones (excluding services), laptops, consumer durables, airline and shipping lines, musical instruments and entertainment. The ASC notes that advertisers of fast-moving consumer goods have a consensus not to devise comparative advertising. Despite this, local advertisements do not mention the brand directly, preferring to refer competitors by "Brand X" or "the leading brand", as is practiced in the United States.

Prior to this, a local Mirinda Orange campaign around 1976 claimed that people who preferred Royal Tru Orange actually preferred the taste of Mirinda by 45% in a taste test done in Metro Manila according to a survey commissioned by Mirinda, Ace Compton (now operating as Ace Saatchi & Saatchi following a 1982 merger) and Consumer Pulse (the firm Mirinda hired for the taste test). San Miguel Corporation, then the manufacturer and marketer for Royal Tru Orange and the Philippine Board of Advertising (later known as the Advertising Board of the Philippines) asked Mirinda for the raw data for the survey - which Consumer Pulse accepted only if the data were done in closed doors. During this dispute a response by Royal Tru Orange was published on periodicals to encourage people to do the taste test themselves. Ace Compton argued that a butter commercial (brand not mentioned) was allowed prior that directly mentioned its competitor and it didn't make sense for the Philippine Board of Advertising to only specifically target the Mirinda campaign. The Philippine Board of Advertising resisted, and blocked any future advertisement material that directly mentioned any competitors. Mirinda later released an ad that claimed that Mirinda is superior to "the leading orange soft drink", dropping any mention of Royal Tru Orange.

=== United Kingdom ===
In the UK, most of the use of competitor's registered trademark in a comparative advertisement was an infringement of the registration up till the end of 1994. However, the laws on comparative advertising were harmonized in 2000. The current rules on comparative advertising are regulated by a series of EU Directives. Regulation 4 of The Business Protection from Misleading Marketing Regulations 2008 implements the provisions of Directive (EC) 2006/114 in the UK, setting out the conditions under which the comparative element of comparative advertising is permitted, including a requirement for objectivity.

One of the classic cases of comparative advertising in the UK was the O2 v Hutchison case. The European Court of Justice (ECJ) held that there could have been a trademark infringement when a comparative advertiser used the registered trademark for the advertiser's own goods and services. It was also held that a trademark proprietor could not prevent a competitor's use of a sign similar or identical to his mark in a comparative advertisement, which satisfies all the conditions of the Comparative Advertising Directive. If the Advocate General's decision in the O2 case were followed by the ECJ, competitors will not be able to use trademark legislation either to prevent a comparative advertisement through an injunction or to charge in respect of its use. Conversely, in British Airways plc v Ryanair Ltd. a lenient approach was adopted by the UK courts. The use of competitors' trademarks was no longer restricted for businesses competing within an industry, provided that compliance of the conditions set out in the legislation were performed. This meant that businesses are able to use the trademarks of other companies and trade names to distinguish the relative merits of their own products and services over those of their competitors.

=== United States ===
The FTC and BBB National Programs' National Advertising Division (NAD) govern the laws of comparative advertising in the United States including the treatment of comparative advertising claims. FTC stated that comparative advertising could benefit consumers and encourages comparative advertising, provided that the comparisons are "clearly identified, truthful, and non-deceptive". Although comparative advertising is encouraged, NAD has stated "claims that expressly or implicitly disparage a competing product should be held to the highest level of scrutiny in order to ensure that they are truthful, accurate, and narrowly drawn". Another major law is the trademark protective Lanham Act, which states that one could incur liability when the message of the comparative advertisement is untrue or uncertain, but has the intention to deceive consumers through the implied message conveyed.

== Effectiveness ==
Comparative advertising has been increasingly implemented through the years, and the types of comparative advertising range from comparing a single attribute dimension, comparing an attribute unique to the target and absent in the referent and comparisons involving attributes unique to both brands. The contributing factors to the effectiveness of comparative advertising include believability, which refers to the extent a consumer can rely on the information provided in comparative advertisements, the level of involvement, and the convenience in evaluation, provided by spoon-feeding the consumer with information that does not require extra effort in recall.

Comparative advertising is generally coupled with negativity, as evidenced by early industry condemnation. Stating reasons such as participation in comparative advertising damaged the honour and credibility of advertising. Studies have suggested that negative information can be stored more effectively, thus generating the impact that any advertisement is purposed for, and more importantly, strong recall. On the contrary, such negativity can either be transferred directly to the brand and the consumer's impression of the brand, various studies through the years have proven that comparative advertising has been responded to negatively.

== Examples ==
Comparative advertising has been used effectively by companies like The National Australia Bank (NAB). Its "break up" campaign made a large impact, winning an award from Cannes, and a substantial increase in its consumer interest.

Apple Inc. has effectively used its Mac vs PC advertisements, by way of the "Get a Mac" campaign, as part of its marketing efforts to increase its market share over the years.

Such companies prove the academic view that comparative advertising is more successful when used by established brands, justified by the credibility and attention an established brand brings. Other famous examples include L'Oreal SA v Bellure NV and Coca-Cola v Pepsi. Comparative advertising has to be executed with caution and deep consideration for the targeted markets as the novelty of the concept affects the effectiveness of the stipulated campaigns.

In the 1980s, during what has been referred to as the cola wars, soft-drink manufacturer Pepsi ran a series of advertisements where people, caught on hidden camera, in a blind taste test, chose Pepsi over rival Coca-Cola. Recently, Verizon and AT&T filed lawsuits against each other due to comparative ads which tried to represent superiority over each other. Similarly, McDonald's and Burger King have done similar evidence between the two burger chains, in which Burger King "flame-broils" burgers compared to McDonald's which "fries" their burgers, an evidence known as the burger wars. Wendy's tried to further follow suit with their famous "Where's the beef?" campaign in 1984, in which three elderly ladies poke fun of a huge bun sandwiched with a small burger patty, in which one (played by Clara Peller) asks the famous question. The campaign faced reality that its Wendy's Single had more beef than the Burger King Whopper or McDonald's Big Mac.

"Daisy" advertisement

The use of comparative advertising has been well established in political campaigns, where typically one candidate will run ads where the record of the other candidate is displayed, for the purpose of disparaging the other candidate. The most famous of these type ads, which only ran once on TV, consisted of a child picking daisies in a field, while a voice which sounded like Barry Goldwater performed a countdown to zero before the launch of a nuclear weapon which explodes in a mushroom cloud. The ad, "Daisy", was produced by Lyndon B. Johnson's campaign in an attempt to prevent Goldwater from either winning the nomination of his party or being selected.

Another example took place throughout the late 1980s between the rivaling video game companies Nintendo and Sega. The US advertising slogan "Genesis does what Nintendon't" immediately became a catchphrase following the release of the Sega Genesis (known as Mega Drive outside of North America).

A 30-second commercial promoting sustainability, showing soda bottles exploding each time a person makes a drink using his Sodastream machine, was banned in the United Kingdom in 2012. Clearcast, the organization that preapproves TV advertising in the U.K., explained that they "thought it was a denigration of the bottled drinks market." The same ad, crafted by Alex Bogusky, ran in the United States, Sweden, Australia, and other countries. An appeal by Sodastream to reverse Clearcast's decision to censor the commercial was rejected. A similar ad was expected to air during Super Bowl XLVII in February 2013 but was banned by CBS for jabbing at Coke and Pepsi (two of CBS's largest sponsors).

In 2012, Microsoft's Bing (formerly MSN Search) began to run a campaign about which search engine they prefer as it compared Bing to Google, and that more people preferred Bing over Google. The campaign was titled "Bing It On".
