= Ramon Jimenez =

Ramon Jimenez may refer to:

- Ramon Jimenez Jr. (1955–2020), Filipino executive, Secretary of Tourism
- Ramon T. Jimenez (1924–2013), Filipino attorney

Ramón Jiménez may refer to:

- Ramón Jiménez Coe (1915–1980), Chilean politician
- Ramón Jiménez Fuentes (born 1955), Mexican politician
- Ramón Jiménez López (born 1951), Mexican politician
- Ramón Jiménez Gaona (born 1969), Paraguayan athlete and politician
- Ramón Jiménez y Robredo (fl. early 19th century), Costa Rican politician
- Ramón Jiménez (athlete), competed in the 1988 South American Junior Championships in Athletics

== See also ==
- Juan Ramón Jiménez (1881–1958), Spanish poet and writer, Nobel laureate
