= Fehérvár =

The Hungarian placename Fehérvár ("white castle") may refer to:

- Székesfehérvár, city located in central Hungary,
- Dnyeszterfehérvár, city and port of Bilhorod-Dnistrovskyi in Odesa Oblast, Ukraine
- Gyulafehérvár, city located in Transylvania, Romania
- Nándorfehérvár, the old Hungarian name of Belgrade, Serbia
- Tengerfehérvár, city and municipality of Biograd na Moru in northern Dalmatia, Croatia
- Videoton FC Fehérvár, football club from Székesfehérvár, Hungary
