= We Give the World Our Best =

We Give the World Our Best – The Philippines
- Agency: N/A (in house)
- Market: Worldwide
- Language: English
- Media: Billboard, video, bus advertising
- Running time: 30–60 seconds
- Product: Overseas Filipino Workers
- Country: Philippines

We Give the World Our Best – The Philippines was a marketing campaign by the Philippines Office of the Presidential Adviser on Creative Communications (OPACC).

== Background ==
The We Give the World Our Best campaign was launched by the OPACC, which is headed by Paul Soriano. The campaign was described as a "country branding campaign" meant to uplift and honor Filipino migrant workers, the Overseas Filipino Workers (OFWs).

Stories of various overseas Filipino were featured in the campaign meant to cover various countries. This include May Parsons, a nurse in the United Kingdom, Charm, a caregiver in the same country, and DJ, a barista in Italy.

=== London nurse bus advertisement ===
We Give the World Our Best's London advertisement featuring Filipino-British nurse May Parsons received wider public attention in the Philippines. The advertisement featured Parsons holding up a syringe with the tagline, "We give the world our best. The Philippines." It recognized Parson's feat of administering the very first COVID-19 vaccine, a milestone in COVID-19 pandemic response. The advertisement received placements on London's double decker buses. To maximize the reach of the bus ads, it was rolled out in time of King Charles III's coronation.

=== Videos ===
Three videos featuring three overseas Filipinos were released on YouTube on May 19, 2023.

Name	Featuring	Duration
Nurse: We Give The World Our Best. The Philippines	May Parsons (United Kingdom)	0:30
Barista: We Give The World Our Best. The Philippines	Dan Johnson Nobleza (Italy)	1:00
Caregiver: We Give The World Our Best. The Philippines	Charmaine Espinoza (United Kingdom)	1:00

The videos were played at Times Square in New York City and billboards in Inglewood, Los Angeles from June 12 to 13 in time for Philippine Independence Day. It was also previously featured at the La Mer City Walk in Dubai.

== Reception ==
The campaign was misconstrued as a tourism marketing campaign. The Department of Tourism (DOT) on May 11, 2023, clarified that We Give the World Our Best is not the country's tourism campaign. The OPACC released a statement on May 13 clarifying the campaign's goals. In June 2023, the DOT would launch the Love the Philippines tourism marketing campaign.

The London advertisement featuring nurse Parson received criticism. Speaking as chair of the Senate committee on tourism, Senator Nancy Binay expressed concern and was bothered that the advertisement was promoting the country as a labor exporting nation and was against the idea of commodifying OFWs. Labor group Migrante tagged the advertisement as glorifying brain drain.

The campaign received support from the Philippine Tour Operators Association. Parsons through a Twitter post accompanied by a photo of the bus ad expressed hope that Filipino nurses around the world "feel seen" through the advertisement.
