= Erwin Mallari =

Filipino watercolor artist

- Born: November 3, 1979 (age 46); Manila, Philippines
- Known for: Watercolor Painting
- Spouse: Alice David Mallari
- Children: Kalijah David Mallari, Rando David Mallari (TG)

Erwin Mallari (born November 3, 1979) is a Filipino artist best known for his watercolor art. Born in Malabon, Metro Manila, Erwin studied at the University of the East College of Fine Arts from 1997 to 2002 in Caloocan.

While pursuing his degree, Erwin decided to work as well, and became a newspaper handler at The Philippine Star in 2000 while schooling as a “free section” student. He was a cleanup artist in an animation studio in the city for less than a year. Erwin eventually decided to work full-time and was hired as a propsman in Ever Gotesco, a local shopping mall. Among his other jobs included being a Minilab operator at Columbia Global Photo Sales Corp. (2003-2006), a graphic designer at Destileria Limtuaco (2006), a graphic/product photographer at Chris Sports (2007-2009), a proof reader at Papercon (2009-2011), and a senior graphic operator at Basic Elements Inc. (2011-2014).

Erwin prefers choosing his own subjects. He prefers the freedom of selecting his own composition and own timelines. Erwin captures different places in Metro Manila with his camera or goes to locations and paints there. He has a personal experience with every piece he creates. He likes to paint sceneries of the daily life in the city.

== Career ==
In 2011, Erwin decided to pursue a career in painting using oil and water color as his preferred medium. In 2012, he decided to concentrate on using watercolor as his main medium when working on his pieces.

Using photography and watercolor, Erwin captures scenes of daily life in Manila. He then translates these images onto paper, creating watercolor images as big as 44in x 83in (3.8 ft x 6.11 ft).

== Exhibits ==
Art Circle Gallery is staging a two-man exhibition featuring the seminal works of Erwin Mallari and Alwinder Sarmiento, in celebration of their artistic documentaries of realism through the ages. Entitled, Now and Then: Retrospection and Introspection, this exhibit allows visitors a glimpse of two sides of Manila at the edge of its past and at the start of its future. In Metro Manila Art Circle Gallery, Mandaluyong. November 22, 2014.

== Awards ==
- 2nd place UECFA 37 the Foundation on the spot competition in watercolor category
- 1st place in Manila Bulletin Sketch Fest 2011
- 2nd place in Manila Bulletin Sketch Fest 2012
- Semifinalist in Metrobank Art & Design Excellency (MADE) 2012
- 2013 art of watercolor (world watercolor competition) semifinalist
- 2014 kulay sa tubig watercolor competition grand prize

== See also ==
- Frans Lanting
- Ram Mallari
- Alwinder Sarmiento

== Footnotes ==
• Erwin Mallari is from Malabon, Metro Manila

• He was born on November 3. 1979

• He is the eldest of two siblings

• He Studied at the University of the East College (UE) Fine Arts from 1997 to 2002
