= White Castle =

White Castle may refer to:

== Castles ==
- White Castle, Monmouthshire, Wales
- White Castle, Nunraw, East Lothian, Scotland
- White House of Choghtu Khong Tayiji, or White Castle, Bulgan Aimag, Mongolia

== Other uses ==
- White Castle, Louisiana, U.S.
- White Castle (film), a 2013 Burmese drama film
- White Castle (restaurant), an American hamburger restaurant chain
- The White Castle, a 1985 novel by Orhan Pamuk
- The White Castle (radio drama), a 2008 installment in the Jack Flanders adventure series
- Whitecastle (community) a community in Wales
- Bilhorod-Dnistrovskyi, Ukraine
- White Castle Whisky, well-known product of Destileria Limtuaco

== See also ==
- Harold & Kumar Go to White Castle, a 2004 American comedy film
- White's Castle, Athy, Ireland
