= It's More Fun in the Philippines! =

Tourism marketing campaign of the Philippines

- 2019 campaign logo and slogan
- Agency: BBDO Guerrero
- Client: Department of Tourism
- Market: Worldwide
- Language: English
- Media: Various (marketing campaign)
- Product: Tourism in the Philippines
- Release date: January 6, 2012
- Country: Philippines
- Preceded by: Pilipinas Kay Ganda (scrapped); Wow Philippines
- Followed by: Love the Philippines
- Official website: www.itsmorefuninthephilippines.com

It's More Fun in the Philippines! was the tourism marketing campaign of the Philippines from 2012 to 2023.

== History ==
=== Conceptualization ===
It's More Fun in the Philippines! was conceptualized in 2011 as the Philippines' tourism marketing campaign. It was finalized during the administration of Department of Tourism (DOT) Secretary Ramon Jimenez. This was the second attempt under the administration of Philippine President Benigno Aquino III to come up with a replacement campaign for Wow Philippines, after the negatively received Pilipinas Kay Ganda campaign under Tourism Secretary Alberto Lim.

Eight advertisement agencies; Aspac, BBDO Guerrero, DDB, Dentsu, J.Romero, JWT, Lowe and Y&R. made their pitch. BBDO's campaign was selected by the DOT. The campaign name, which is also its slogan was coined by BBDO chairman David Guerrero after a snorkeling trip. His proposition that various activities could be "more fun" to do in the Philippines than to do the same in another country.

=== Launch ===
The campaign was officially launched on January 6, 2012.

=== 2019 relaunch ===
In January 2019, the DOT announced that it would relaunch the campaign. The tourism agency selected BBDO Guerrero once again over three other agencies for the brand refresh. BBDO Guerero unveiled a new logo for the campaign. The campaign relied heavily on the use of social media.

The campaign was replaced by "Love the Philippines" campaign in June 2023.

== Reception ==
The DOT made a target of 7.4 million tourist arrivals to the Philippines in 2018. The target was not met, with only 7.1 million arrivals recorded. The DOT however remarked that the figure is already the "highest ever" in the Philippine tourism industry compared to records in the previous years. It named the Boracay closure as one of the causes for not meeting its target.
