= Pilipinas Kay Ganda =

Tourism marketing campaign of the Philippines

The controversial logo for the advertisement campaign (left). Logo of the Polish tourism campaign, Polska. The Pilipinas Kay Ganda's logo was allegedly lifted from its Polish equivalent.

Pilipinas Kay Ganda (lit. 'Philippines, So Beautiful') was a short-lived advertising campaign made by the Department of Tourism to promote tourism in the Philippines. Launched in 2010, it replaced the WOW Philippines campaign that was launched in 2002.

The tourism slogan and the associated logo used for the campaign were controversial and received mostly negative reception from the Filipino public, even leading to the resignation of the country's then-Tourism Secretary, Alberto Lim. Pilipinas Kay Ganda was eventually replaced, in 2012, with "It's More Fun in the Philippines!".

== Conception ==
The advertising agency Campaigns & Grey had advisory capacity over the Pilipinas Kay Ganda campaign, designing the campaign's logo and theme. The agency designed the campaign materials free of charge in support of President Benigno Aquino III's administration. The agency claimed that the released logo was just a study and was released prematurely by the Department of Tourism.

== Plagiarism controversy ==
The Pilipinas Kay Ganda campaign logo design was criticized for alleged plagiarism. Discussions on social media pointed out and suspected that the campaign logo was plagiarized from Poland's tourism campaign, "Polska" (lit. 'Poland'). The logos of Polska and Pilipinas Kay Ganda's font were similar. Both the letter "L" of the campaign slogans were stylized into trees. The difference is that Pilipinas Kay Ganda's letter "L" was stylized into a coconut tree with a smiley face as opposed to Polska's "L" which was stylized into a generic tree.

Tourism Secretary Alberto Lim acknowledged that the Philippine campaign slogan is similar to the Polska logo and commented that the Philippine campaign logo was more colourful. Tourism Undersecretary Enteng Romano, in a text message forwarded by Palace Spokesperson Abi Valte, denied that the Philippine campaign logo was plagiarized and that the logo has enough elements to be distinct from Poland's campaign logo.

== See also ==
- Advertising and marketing controversies in the Philippines
