= Ramon Jimenez Jr. =

Filipino politician (1955–2020)

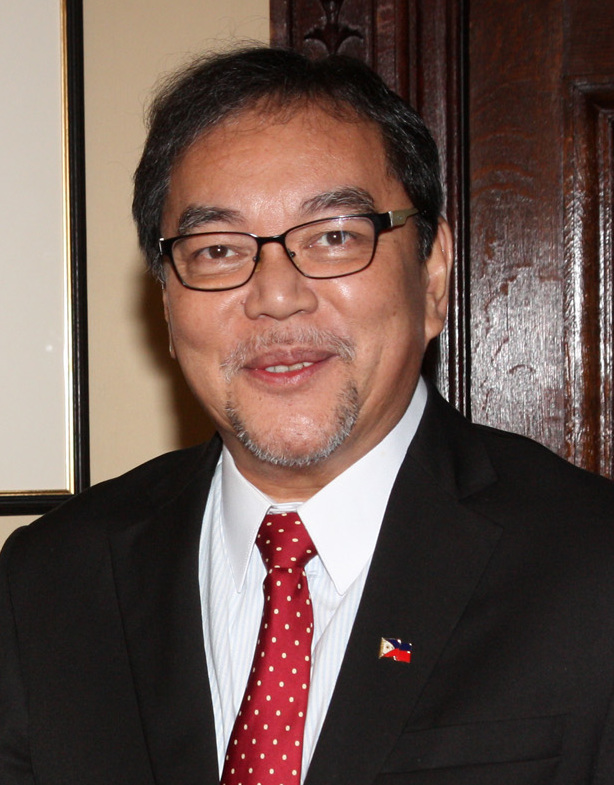

Secretary of Tourism
- In office September 1, 2011 – June 30, 2016
- President: Benigno Aquino III
- Preceded by: Alberto Lim
- Succeeded by: Wanda Corazon Teo

Personal details
- Born: Ramon Reyes Jimenez Jr. July 14, 1955
- Died: April 27, 2020 (aged 64)
- Spouse: Abby Jimenez
- Children: Sassa Jimenez
- Parent: Ramon T. Jimenez
- Education: University of the Philippines College of Fine Arts
- Occupation: Tourism secretary
- Profession: Advertising

Ramon Reyes Jimenez Jr. (July 14, 1955 – April 27, 2020) sometimes known as Monet or Mon Jimenez, was a Filipino advertising executive who previously served in the Cabinet of the Philippines as Secretary of Tourism from 2011 to 2016 during the presidency of Benigno Aquino III. He was appointed as the country's tourism chief following the resignation of Alberto Lim, and during his six-year tenure, tourist arrivals and revenues had almost doubled, and the Philippines improved 20 places in a tourism competitive index among nations. Jimenez assisted with the advertising campaign of Aquino earlier.

== Education ==
Jimenez studied at the University of the Philippines Diliman from elementary school to college. He majored in visual communications at the UP College of Fine Arts.

== Career ==
=== Advertising ===
Jimenez began his career at Saatchi & Saatchi in the creative department, and then formed a start-up boutique agency in the late 1990s called Jimenez & Partners which, after several mergers, became known in 2011 as Publicis JimenezBasic. He was the senior consultant and joint chief executive officer of WOO (Winning Over Obstacles) Consultants, and helped build JimenezBasic Advertising into the largest creative advertising agency in the country during his stint as joint CEO from 1989 to 2008 with his wife and advertising executive Abby Jimenez. His work at the agency has been closely associated with the rise of Philippine brands such as Jollibee, Selecta Ice Cream, Safeguard Soap, San Miguel Beer, Cebu Pacific and Ivory Soap, among others.

Jimenez had also been the vice-president and executive creative director at Ace-Saatchi & Saatchi Advertising from 1988 to 1989, and also a consultant for marketing of the Ninoy and Corazon Aquino Foundation. He has given numerous presentations at conferences on advertising-related topics. He was instrumental in helping his extended family write a private book on five generations of his family, entitled Generations: In Search of Family, which chronicled the Jimenez clan in the Philippines. The multi-generational book includes his father Ramon T. Jimenez, a prominent labor lawyer, and his daughter Sassa Jimenez, a fashion designer. and his late uncle Nicanor Jimenez, who was a general in the Philippine resistance forces during World War II and later the Philippine ambassador to South Korea.

=== Tourism Secretary ===
He took over the helm of the Tourism Department from Alberto Lim who resigned on August 12, 2011. Speaking to Malacañang reporters in a press conference aired live on radio and television less than 24 hours after President Benigno Aquino III announced his appointment, Jimenez said he would “galvanize the DoT [Department of Tourism] into an honest to goodness selling unit whose “ultimate goal” would be “not only to improve statistics but also ensure that the endeavor would be fulfilling and profitable for Filipinos”. He vowed to make Philippine tourism the “people’s business” and that the country with its picturesque destinations should be “as easy to sell as Chickenjoy”. According to a report in Business Week Mindanao, as head of the tourism department after September 2011, an initial challenge for Jimenez was to come up with a catchy tagline to promote travel visits to the Philippines to compete with tourism campaigns for nations such as Brazil and India and Singapore.

It's More Fun in the Philippines! was conceptualized in 2011 as the Philippines' tourism marketing campaign. It was finalized under his administration. He proposes that various activities could be "more fun" to do in the Philippines than to do the same in another country. The campaign was officially launched on January 6, 2012.

== Death ==
Jimenez died on April 27, 2020, at the age of 64, according to a statement released by Department of Tourism Secretary Bernadette Romulo-Puyat.

Political offices
Preceded by Alberto Lim	Philippine Secretary of Tourism; 2011–2016	Succeeded by Wanda Corazon Teo
