= Alberto Lim =

Filipino businessman

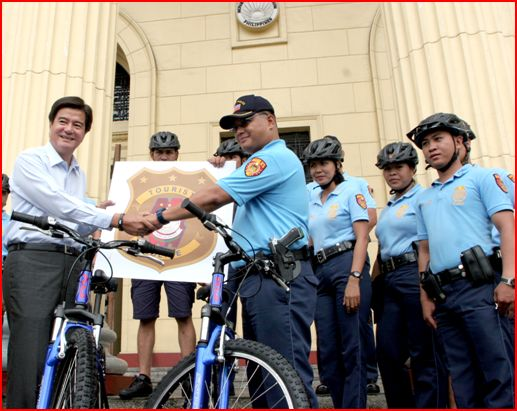
- Alberto Lim turns over to Capt. Jovan Sicat twenty bikes for the use of the Manila Police District Tourist Police (August 2011).

Secretary of Tourism
- In office June 30, 2010 – August 12, 2011
- President: Benigno Aquino III
- Preceded by: Joseph Ace Durano
- Succeeded by: Ramon Jimenez Jr.

Personal details
- Born: Alberto Aldaba Lim
- Occupation: Businessman

Alberto Lim is a Filipino businessman. He is a former Philippine Secretary of Tourism. On June 29, 2010, President Benigno Aquino III picked him as his Secretary of Tourism. He, however, quit his post on August 12, 2011, for personal reasons.

== Background ==
Before being appointed by Benigno Aquino III to the Tourism secretary post, Lim was the president of the Makati Business Club, a group known to support Aquino even before the latter's campaign started.

== Tourism Secretary ==
He took over the helm of the Tourism Department from Joseph Ace Durano. Early speculations also pointed to showbiz talk host Boy Abunda as the new head of the Department of Tourism (DOT) but Abunda declined the post. In appointing Lim, Aquino said: Tourism is seen as one of the key venues for increasing jobs in the country. We need someone who has proven competence in this field".

After 2010 Manila hostage crisis ended with the death of eight hostages on a tourist bus, Lim was appointed with Soliman by the president "to provide everything necessary for the recovery and return home of the survivors". It was the first challenge faced by Lim after his appointment.

Lim was criticized for the tourism slogan Pilipinas Kay Ganda on the basis that foreigners did not understand clearly what it meant even though they were the supposed object of the campaign message. Many notable people asked for his resignation until he finally decided to resign in August 2011.

Political offices
Preceded by Joseph Ace Durano	Philippine Secretary of Tourism; 2010 – 2011	Succeeded by Ramon Jimenez Jr.
