= University of the Philippines School of Labor and Industrial Relations =

UP Diliman School of Labor and Industrial Relations
- University campus
- Type: University of the Philippines College (officially Degree-Granting Unit)
- Established: 1954
- Dean: Melisa R. Serrano, Ph. D
- Administration: Dr. Verna Dinah Q. Viajar (College Secretary); Asst. Prof. Benjamin B. Velasco (Graduate Studies Coordinator)
- Location: Bonifacio Hall, UP Diliman, Quezon City, Philippines
- Website: solair.upd.edu.ph

The UP School of Labor and Industrial Relations (SOLAIR) is a constituent unit in the University of the Philippines Diliman, the national university of the Philippines.

== History ==
UP SOLAIR traces its origins from the Labor Education Center (LEC) which was established in 1954, to promote social justice and labor empowerment through education, research and labor empowerment. It started as a project of the UP School of Business Administration, through its Dean Jose Valmonte in 1953 in response to the new era of collective bargaining and economic unionism with the passage of the Industrial Peace Act (RA No. 875- Magna Carta of Labor) in 1953 (Sibal, 2008). Training and professional staff including labor lawyers, researchers and trainers conducted studies, training and capacity-building programs to assist labor organizations, particularly the trade unions and cooperatives.

The Center expanded its services in Asia. According to former Dean Ofreneo, this was an offshoot of the Cold War during the 1950s (Ofreneo, 2008 as cited by Sibal, 2008). The center was subsequently renamed the Asian Labor Education Center (ALEC) in 1958 and became the leading regional training institution for Asian trade union leaders.

=== Directors ===
The Directors and Deans of UP SOLAIR were:

- Cicero D. Calderon, DJS (1954–1962)
- Flerida Ruth Pineda-Romero (1962–1963)
- Ramon T. Jimenez (1963–1970)
- Manuel A. Dia, PhD (1970–1982)
- Jose C. Gatchalian, PhD(1982–1988)
- Rene E. Ofreneo, PhD (1988–1992 and 1995–1998)
- Marie E. Aganon, PhD (1992–1995)
- Maragtas S.V. Amante, PhD (1998–2002)
- Juan Amor Palafox (2002–2004)
- Jorge V. Sibal (2004–2011)
- Atty. Jonathan P. Sale, DPA (2011–2016)
- Ronahlee A. Asuncion, PhD (2016–2023)
- Melisa R. Serrano, PhD (2023–Present)

== From ALEC to SOLAIR ==
Graduate studies were subsequently offered on April 18, 1975, in addition to the center's extension and research activities. By that time, the institution's name had changed from ALEC to Institute of Industrial Relations (IIR). On March 24, 1988, it was renamed School of Labor and Industrial Relations (SOLAIR) "to adequately reflect the functions and the areas of concern of the unit, and in keeping with nomenclature of the counterpart industrial relations schools in the international academic community." It is the pioneering degree-granting unit in Labor and Industrial Relations, within a major University in the Philippines and Asia (Kaufman, 2004 as cited by Sibal, 2008). The School's research and extension programs expanded into 3 centers on December 20, 1996: Center for Labor and Grassroots Initiatives (CLGI); Center for the Administration of Labor Justice (CaLJ); and Center for Industry Productivity and Competitiveness (CIPC) (Sibal, 2008).

== UP SOLAIR today ==
The school offers graduate degree programs in Diploma in Industrial Relations and Master of Industrial Relations. With more than 400 graduate students, SOLAIR is among the biggest graduate schools in UP Diliman.

It regularly conducts seminars, symposia and training programs catering for human resource practitioners, cooperative practitioners and labor unions, among others.

The other officials of SOLAIR are:

- Dr. Ronahlee A. Asuncion, Director, Center for Labor and Grassroots Initiatives
- Dr. Melisa R. Serrano, Dean & Director, Center for the Administration of Labor Justice
- Dr. Virgel C. Binghay, Director, Center for Labor and Industry Productivity
- Rowena Melican, Administrative Officer
- Irene B. Sia, Librarian

Among the university, national and international awards received by the school are:

- Outstanding Administrator award to Dean Jose Gatchalian on UP's Foundation Day on June 18, 1986;
- Sikap-Gawa (Initiative and Work) Industrial Peace award to Prof. Jose Gatchalian by the Bishops-Businessmen's Conference (BBC) for Human Development in 1992;
- Gawad Chanselor (Chancellor's award) to Prof. Maragtas Amante as "Best Faculty Researcher" and to Ms. Cecilia Basa as "Outstanding University Extension Specialist" in 1995;
- Sikap-Gawa Industrial Peace award to Prof. Cesario Azucena Jr. by the BBC on May 3, 1995;
- Sikap-Gawa Industrial Peace award for "Training and Research" to UP SOLAIR by the BBC in 1996;
- Gawad Chanselor to UP SOLAIR for "Best in Public Service" by a UP Diliman unit in 1997;
- Quezon Medalya ng Karangalan (Medal of Honor) to Dean Rene Ofreneo for "Public Service and Industrial Relations" by the Quezon provincial government on August 19, 1998;
- Centenary Book award to Prof. Cesario Azucena Jr. by the Supreme Court of the Philippines on June 8, 2001;
- Gawad Chanselor for "Best in Extension Program" to UP SOLAIR and "Best Individual Published Research" to Dr. Rene Ofreneo in 2002;
- Gawad Chanselor for "Best in Extension Program" to UP SOLAIR in 2003;
- Labor-Management Cooperation (LMC) Partnership award to Prof. Virgel Binghay by the Philippine Association of Labor-Management Councils, Inc. in 2003;
- Top Ten Outstanding Dapitanon to Prof. Virgel Binghay in Industrial Relations by the Dapitan City Government in 2003;
- UP President's International Publication award to Prof. Rene Ofreneo for the Chapter "Philippines" in the APEC HRM Handbook in 2003;
- Natatanging (Outstanding) Alumni to Prof. Nick Barriatos for "Public Service" and Ms. Cecilia Basa for "Extension" in 2005 and to Prof. Rene Ofreneo for "Research and Public Service" in 2006 by the UP Industrial Relations Alumni Association (UP-IRAA);
- HRD Leadership award to Prof. Virgel Binghay from the World HRD Congress in Mumbai, India in 2006;
- Outstanding Alumni to Prof. Nick Barriatos by the Lyceum University of the Philippines in 2008; and
- Natatanging Alumni to Prof. Virgel Binghay for "Research" by the UP-IRAA in 2008
- UP SOLAIR Master of Industrial Relations (MIR) was included in the top 200 best Masters in Human Resources Management (HRM) in the world in 2011. The award was given by Eduniversal International Scientific Committee based in Paris, France. (Sibal, 2008).

== Student life ==
The students of the college are from diverse backgrounds. Some are human resource practitioners (consultants, trainers, labor and employment relations specialists). There are students working in the public sector, legal profession and academia.

The UP School of Labor and Industrial Relations Student Council (UP SOLAIR SC) was formally established in 2008, and is the official student representative of the School. This was previously held by the UP Industrial Relations Society (UP IRS), when the officials of the organization represented the student body in the School.
