= Sassa Jimenez =

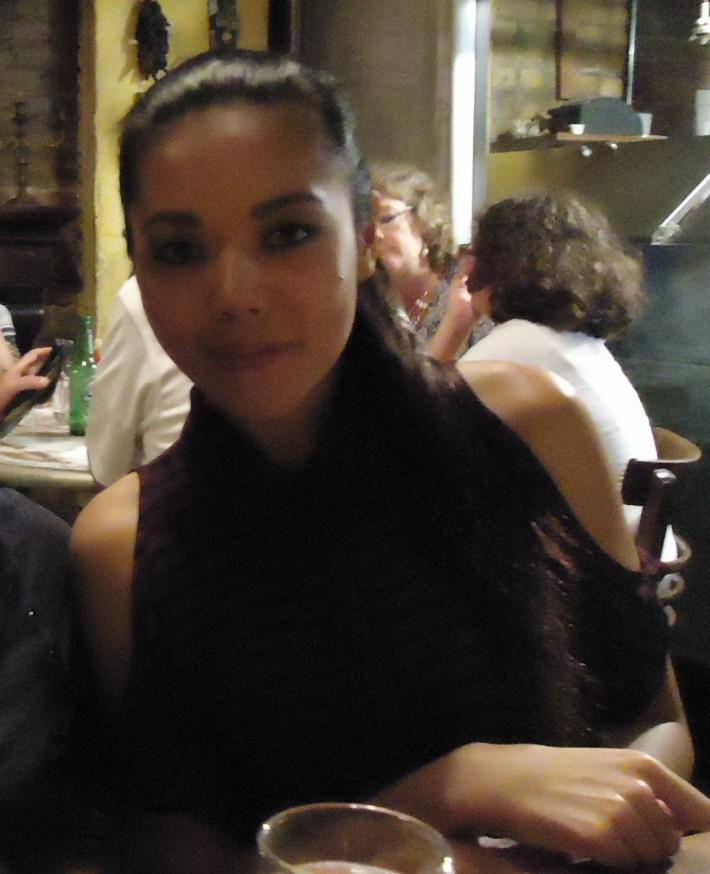
- Born: December 17, 1987 (age 38)
- Education: Fashion Institute of Design and Merchandising in Los Angeles
- Parent(s): Abby & Monet Jimenez
- Relatives: Ramon T. Jimenez (grandfather)

Sassa Jimenez (born December 17, 1987) is a Filipina fashion designer. She was selected as one of the presenters at the bi-annual Philippine Fashion Week. In 2009, she focused her "club glam" style towards "partyphiles" by using snakeskin and metallic. A report in Status Magazine suggested that she was moving away from her "signature pretty and sweet designs" and instead playing with leather, dark colors, and different silhouettes in 2012.

== Early life ==
Her father serves as a tourism secretary. She studied creative writing at the Ateneo de Manila University. Later, she studied at the Fashion Institute of Design and Merchandising in Los Angeles, California. She finished the course in a year and a half and graduated cum laude.

== Career ==
In 2008, Jimenez began showcasing her designs at the Philippine Fashion Week. Her collection was described as "refreshing and feminine, with classic, clean lines and surprising twists", "a breath of fresh air", "could have been purchased off the rack from local retail stores", "polished, sleek, and sexy", with a 1940s old-school look.
