= Ramon T. Jimenez =

Ramon Tabuena Jimenez
- Born: June 26, 1924; Philippine Islands
- Died: July 22, 2013 (aged 89); Quezon City
- Citizenship: Philippines
- Education: University of the Philippines
- Occupations: Attorney, Arbitrator
- Years active: 60
- Known for: labor relations law
- Title: Lawyer
- Spouse: Florencia Reyes Jimenez
- Children: Ramon Jimenez, Jr. Tourism secretary
- Relatives: Sassa Jimenez (granddaughter); Abby Jimenez (daughter-in-law)

Ramon Tabuena Jimenez (June 26, 1924 – July 22, 2013) was a prominent attorney in the Philippines specializing in labor law. He was notable for arbitrating high-profile labor disputes. He served as dean of the University of the Philippines School of Labor and Industrial Relations from 1963 to 1970. He was published in the International Encyclopaedia of Laws, representing Philippine labor law. He participated in decisions as an arbitrator which were cited by the Supreme Court of the Philippines. He published a textbook about employee relations. In 2003, Jimenez served as chairman of a panel of voluntary arbitrators and represented the body in cases involving labor law. He died in July 2013 aged 89.

== Publications ==
- Industrial Relations and Labor Laws in Asia, editors Deere & Mitchell, Philippines section written by Ramon T. Jimenez

== See also ==
- University of the Philippines School of Labor and Industrial Relations
