= Advertising Board of the Philippines =

Advertising Trade Association

Adboard
- Advertising Board of the Philippines
- Successor: Ad Standards Council
- Formation: May 3, 1974; 52 years ago
- Dissolved: June 2015; 11 years ago
- Purpose: Self-regulation of the advertising industry / trade association
- Website: www.adboard.com.ph (archived)

Advertising Board of the Philippines (Adboard) was an advertising trade association in the Philippines. Founded in 1974, it served as a centralized self-regulatory body for the country's advertising industry until its closure of operations in 2014.

== History ==
The Advertising Board of the Philippines (Adboard) was incorporated as the Philippine Board of Advertising on May 3, 1974. It was established after a series of meetings in 1973 by major stakeholders of advertising industry in the Philippines. Its foundation was officially supported by the government's Department of Public Information (DPI). The PBA was renamed as the Adboard in 1989. The Adboard served as the advertising self-regulation body of the Philippines until 2008, when the Ad Standards Council took over the role.

In the 2010s, the Adboard saw some of its founding member organizations filing a leave of absence. The organization underwent an unspecified internal crisis which led to the cancellation of its Advertising Congress scheduled to be hosted in Davao City in 2013 for the first time in its history. The organization ceased operations on August 15, 2014, and publicly announced that it would be dissolving on October 27, 2014. The Adboard officially became defunct in June 2015. The original role of the Adboard has been assumed by multiple advertising bodies.

== Role ==
The Adboard served as the umbrella organization of the Philippines' advertising industry. It oversees the development and practice of advertising in the country through self-regulation. It was guided by a Code of Ethics concepted by its member-organizations in consultation with the Bureau of Standards for Mass Media under the DPI in 1973. Its self-regulatory role is also guided by the Advertising Content Regulation Manual of Procedures and the Standards of Trade Practices and Conduct Manual.

== Member organizations ==
The Adboard's members included:

- Philippine Association of National Advertisers (PANA)
- Association of Accredited Advertising Agencies-Philippines (4As)
- Print Media Organization (PRIMO)
- Independent Block Timers Association of the Philippines (IBA)
- Kapisanan ng mga Brodkaster sa Pilipinas (KBP)
- Cinema Advertising Association of the Philippines (CAAP)
- Advertising Suppliers Association of the Philippines (ASAP)
- Marketing and Opinion Research Society of the Philippines (MORES)
