= Campaigns & Grey =

- Company type: Subsidiary of WPP plc
- Industry: Advertising, Marketing
- Founded: 1986 (as Campaigns, Inc.)
- Founder: Yolanda Villanueva-Ong; Marilyn Villapando; Jocelyn Mendoza; Edd Fuentes; Gil Corcuera; Bubut Noche
- Headquarters: Manila, Philippines
- Number of locations: 3 (Metro Manila, Cebu City and Davao City)
- Area served: Philippines
- Key people: John Lucas (CEO)
- Services: Brand management, Marketing strategy, Creative development, Direct marketing, Public relations, Public affairs, Digital marketing, Production
- Number of employees: 80
- Parent: WPP plc (Grey Global Group) (1994-present); Interpublic Group (1992-1994)
- Website: www.grey.com/philippines

Campaigns & Grey is a Philippine-based marketing communications company affiliated with the Grey Group. It is part of Grey's Asia-Pacific operations with offices located in Makati handling the national requirements of its major clients and coordinated services for global accounts. Its affiliates Campaigns Cebu and Campaigns Davao handle marketing communications for Visayas and Mindanao clients as well as provincial initiatives of Manila-based clients.

Aside from advertising, Campaigns & Grey offers services in various marketing communications disciplines: strategic planning and research; public relations, activation, digital marketing, communications for advocacies, graphic design and pre-press through its specialized business units – Campaigns Public Relations (CaPRi), Campaigns Social Response (CSR), Bacon, Camp Apple and Neuron.

Collectively, the list of major clients include: GlaxoSmithKline, Procter & Gamble, Sun Cellular, SM Supermalls, Universal Robina Corporation, and Wyeth Philippines.

== History ==
Campaigns (1986–1992)

Campaigns, Inc. was founded in 1986 by Yolanda Ong, Marilyn Villapando, Jocelyn Mendoza, Edd Fuentes, Gil Corcuera and Bubut Noche.

In 1991, Campaigns set up a public relations and advocacy unit, Campaigns Advocacy and Public Relations Inc. (CAPRI) to serve the Philippine Department of Health. In 2005, with a steadily increasing volume of work coming in from government and nongovernment agencies, an advocacy unit named Campaigns Social Response (CSR) was spun off from CAPRI.

Campaigns Universal, Inc. (1992–1994)

In 1992, Campaigns joined the Interpublic Group of Companies as its third parallel agency alongside McCann Erickson and Lowe Lintas. As part of the acquisition, it became Campaigns Universal, Inc.

A satellite office, Camp Cebu, was established in 1994 and focused on growing the agency's business in the Visayas region. It is today the largest Cebu-based ad agency affiliated with a Manila-based agency, averaging gross billings of approximately PhP 90M per year in 2009.

Campaigns & Grey (1994–present)

In 1994, at the prodding of key client Procter & Gamble, Grey Worldwide acquired IPG's stake in Campaigns Universal, prompting another name change to Campaigns & Grey. Campaigns moved from the IPG group of companies to Grey Worldwide's parent, the WPP Group. As part of the WPP Group, Campaigns & Grey gained access to proprietary planning tools, research studies and other marketing communications trends from all over the world.

2005 saw Campaigns & Grey move to a new office along Paseo de Roxas in the Makati Central Business District. Along with the change of address came a reorganization, with new business units being established, specifically:

- Neuron, a second, independent agency focused on serving local businesses,
- Campaigns Social Response (CSR), a unit focusing on corporate social responsibility communications,
- Bacon, a below-the-line agency focusing on activation, design and digital marketing, and
- Campaigns Davao, a full-service agency in Davao City further augmenting the group's capabilities in the Visayas and Mindanao.

== Recent history ==
Grey Group acquires a majority stake in Campaigns & Grey in the Philippines

In August 2011, WPP announced that its wholly owned operating company Grey, the global advertising network of Grey Group, agreed to acquire further shares in the capital of Campaigns and Grey Inc. Grey has held a minority stake in C&G since 1994 and on completion will hold a majority of the shares.

Yoly Ong, Group Chairperson, Campaigns & Grey, said, “This partnership comes at exactly the right time in Campaigns & Grey’s 25th year. As the industry raises the bar and the competition grows even fiercer, Grey and WPP provide enormous resources to keep us in A-one shape. We are happy to be part of Grey Group and hope to do our share of ‘Famously Effective’ work.”

Campaigns & Grey Ranks among the Top 10 Creative Agencies in the Country

In January 2011, Campaigns & Grey was ranked among the top 10 creative agencies in the Philippines for 2008-2009 by Adobo magazine, a leading publication for the country's advertising and marketing community.

Pilipinas Kay Ganda Controversy

In November 2010, the Philippine Department of Tourism unveiled a new slogan and logo intended to the aging "WOW Philippines" campaign. The new slogan, "Pilipinas Kay Ganda" (Philippines, So Beautiful!), was scored by critics as being uninteresting and unintelligible to foreigners. One blogger identified Campaigns & Grey as the agency behind the slogan.

The controversy intensified when similarities between the Pilipinas Kay Ganda logo and that of Poland's tourism campaign were pointed out. Allegations of plagiarism were leveled against the Department of Tourism and the agency. Two days after the controversy began, the agency released a statement describing the extent of their involvement with the project, specifying that the work was rushed into production without market testing despite the initial agreement that Campaigns' work was only to be preliminary in nature. Despite the statement, some Netizens continued to deride the agency while others took a less critical stance and instead focused on the Department of Tourism's role in the fiasco.

A week after the controversy began, Undersecretary Enteng Romano of the DOT turned in his irrevocable resignation, accepting all responsibility for the controversy and absolving the agency of blame.

Yoly Villanueva-Ong, Ompong Remigio Leave Campaigns & Grey

Co-founder and group chairperson Yolanda "Yoly" Villanueva-Ong retired from the advertising industry in July 2014, and handed over the reins of C&G to Boboy Consunji and Cherry Gutierrez.

Two months later, Maria Corazon Paulina "Ompong" Remigio, executive creative director (ECD) of Campaigns & Grey, stepped down to give way to the launch of her own advertising agency called Fat Free. Rizielle Tangan and Noel Orosa replaced her.

Consunji retired from the industry on 2018 while Gutierrez retired much earlier on 2016. John Lucas was appointed as CEO on 2018.

== Awards ==
Campaigns & Grey is a multi-awarded advertising agency with more than two decades of award-winning work. Recent wins include:

- Araw Awards 2009 - 4 Gold, 5 Silver, and 5 Bronze Araw Awards for various campaigns.
- Catholic Mass Media Awards 2010 - Best Print Ad, Branded (with Cemex).
- Tinta Awards 2010 – 1 Bronze and 1 Finalist (with Galderma / Cetaphil).
- PANATA Awards 2010 - 1 Silver (with Wyeth Philippines) and 1 Bronze (with Electrolux Philippines).
- 2014 New York Festivals - 1 Bronze (with the Provincial Government of Quezon)
