= Ad Standards Council of the Philippines =

Regulatory body in the Philippines

Ad Standards Council
- Abbreviation: ASC
- Predecessor: Advertising Board of the Philippines
- Formation: March 31, 2008; 18 years ago
- Type: Non-stock, Nonprofit
- Purpose: Self-regulation of the advertising industry
- Headquarters: Makati, Philippines
- Region served: Philippines
- Owner: Philippines Department of Finance
- Website: asc.com.ph

The Ad Standards Council (ASC) is a regulatory body of the advertising industry under the Philippines Department of Finance.

== History ==
The Ad Standards Council (ASC) was established by the Kapisanan ng mga Brodkaster ng Pilipinas (KBP), Philippine Association of National Advertisers (PANA), and the Association of Accredited Advertising Agencies - Philippines. It started operations on March 31, 2008 when the three organization signed an agreement with the Advertising Board of the Philippines (AdBoard). Under the deal, the ASC took over the screening function of the Adboard through its Advertising Content and Review Committee (ACRC). The Adboard would later become defunct in July 2016.

== Role ==
The ASC is a self-regulatory organization and through its screening committee reviews and approves advertising materials in the Philippines prior to its placement or broadcast. This includes television, radio, print, internet, out of home, and cinema ads. The materials are reviewed if they are compliant with the prevailing advertising code of ethics. The Code of Ethics are based on prevailing national laws such as the Consumer Protection Act and the Milk Code and international standards such as the ASEAN handbook for cosmetic products. The ASC does not regulate political ads such as one used by candidates for elections.

== See also ==
- Movie and Television Review and Classification Board
