= Love the Philippines =

Tourism marketing campaign of the Philippines

- Campaign logo
- Agency: DDB Philippines
- Client: Department of Tourism
- Market: Worldwide
- Language: English
- Media: Various (marketing campaign)
- Product: Tourism in the Philippines
- Release date: June 27, 2023
- Country: Philippines
- Budget: ₱300 million (Note: As per the terms of reference for the project bidding. ₱49 million is allocated for the launch)
- Preceded by: It's More Fun in the Philippines!
- Official website: philippines.travel

Love the Philippines is the tourism marketing campaign of the Philippines since June 2023.

== History ==
=== Replacing the old campaign ===
Before the Love the Philippines tourism campaign, the Department of Tourism (DOT) had been using the It's More Fun in the Philippines! campaign which was adopted in 2012 during the administration of President Benigno Aquino III. It continued during the administration of his successor President Rodrigo Duterte. The latest campaign was launched during the presidency of Bongbong Marcos.

In May 2023, after the DOT was caught in a controversy regarding the Office of the Presidential Adviser on Creative Communications' We Give the World Our Best campaign in London, Tourism Secretary Christina Garcia-Frasco said the DOT would come up with an "enhanced tourism slogan". It was further announced that the newer campaign would feature the country as a "treasure trove" of culture and history and that a white market study was conducted on the prevailing campaign at the time.

=== Launch ===
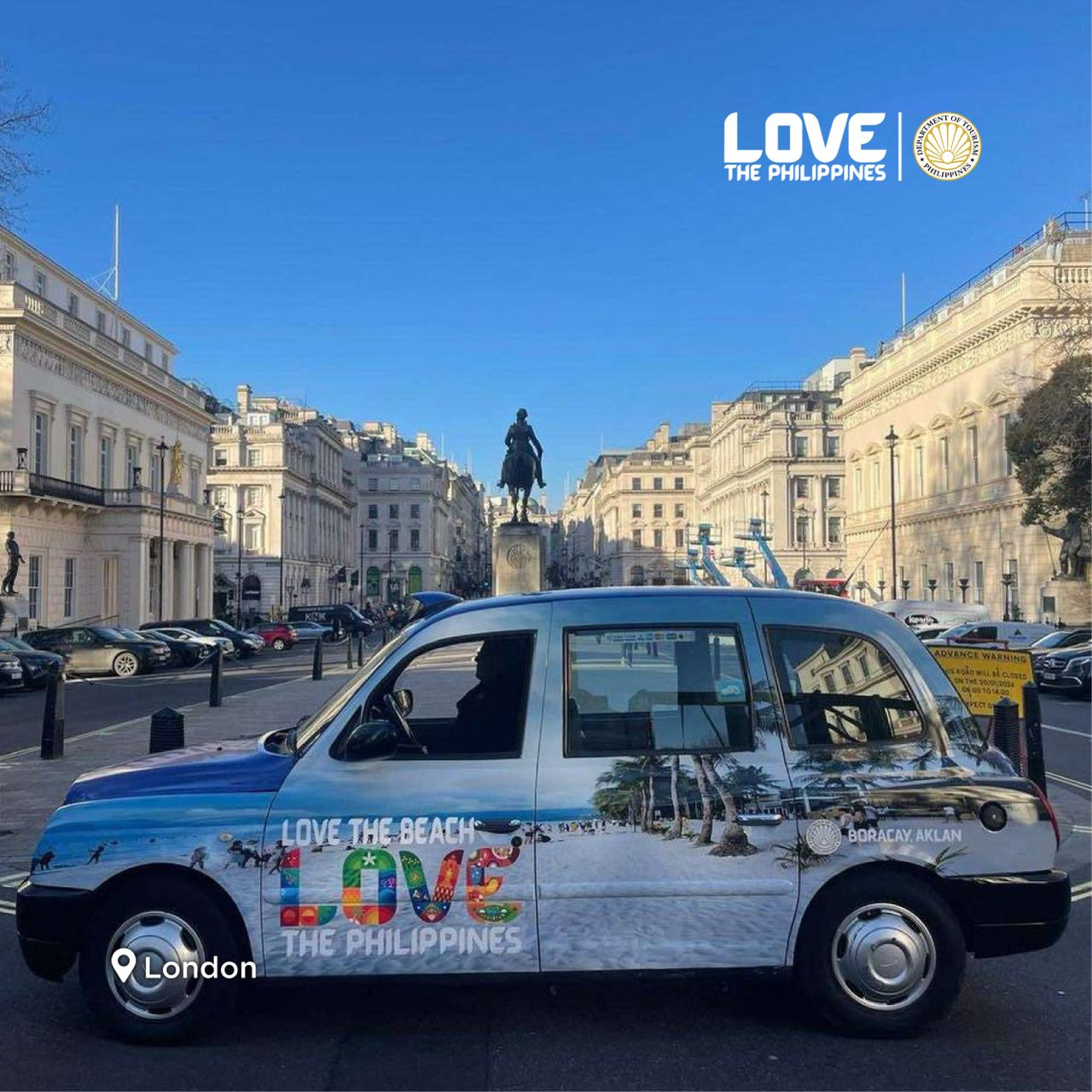
A taxi in London with a Boracay-themed wrap and the slogan Love the Beach, Love the Philippines.

The Love the Philippines campaign was launched on June 27, 2023, replacing the roughly 11-year It's More Fun campaign. The campaign was conceptualized by DDB Philippines, and was selected through bidding. The Love the Philippines campaign, including the logo and other collaterals, cost ₱49 million to conceptualize.

The launch video for the campaign sparked outrage from the internet when it was discovered to include stock footage of numerous foreign tourist destinations, including those from Brazil, Indonesia, Switzerland, Thailand, and the United Arab Emirates. DDB Philippines apologized for the oversight. However, the DOT still canceled its contract with DDB. Despite the contract termination, the DOT vowed to continue to use Love the Philippines.

== Reception ==
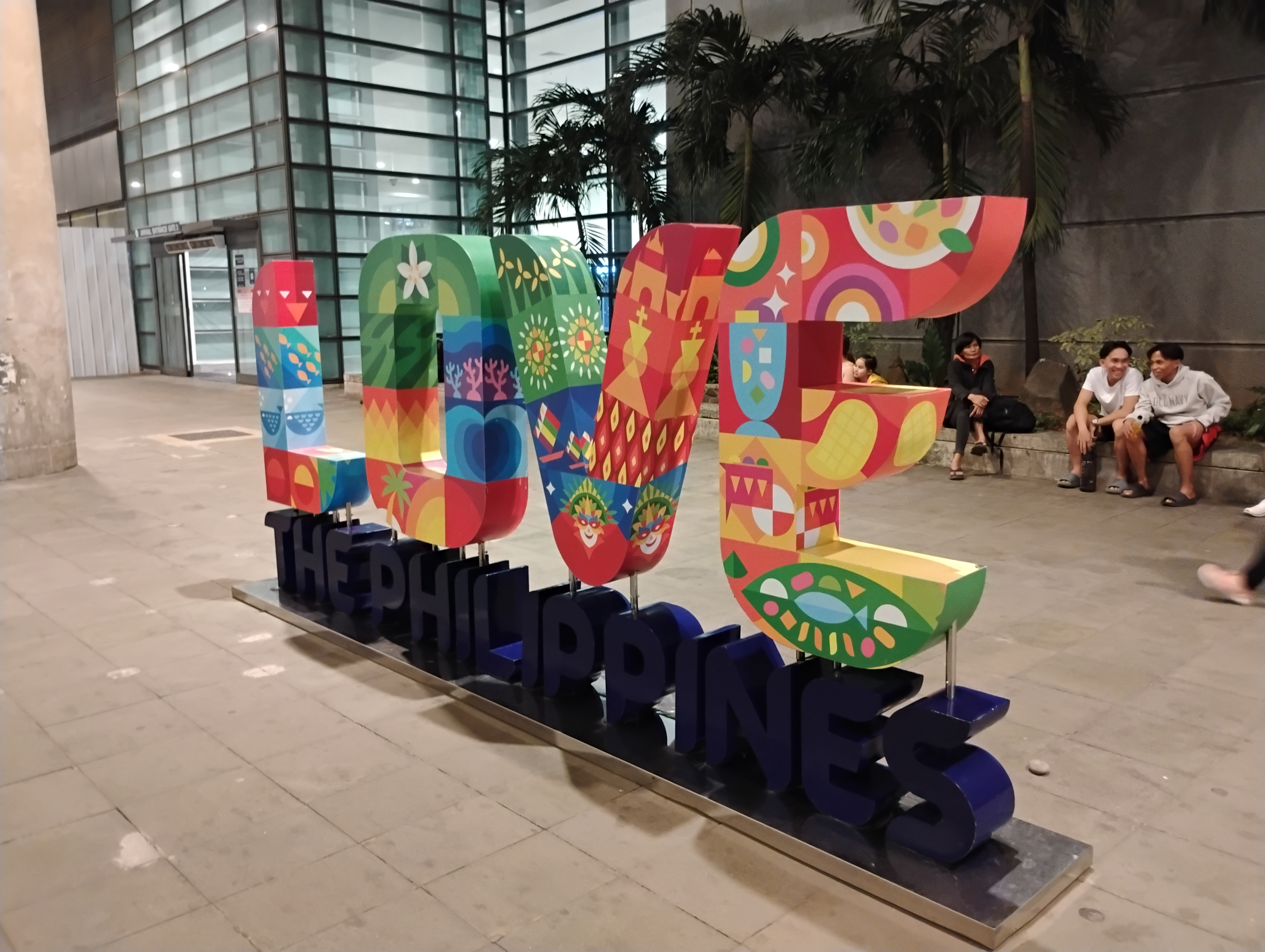
Love the Philippines marker at Ninoy Aquino International Airport Terminal 3

Former Tourism Secretary Dick Gordon, under whose tenure the tourism campaign WOW Philippines was used, praised the campaign, calling its slogan "catchy and easy to recall". The Hotel Sales and Marketing Professionals Association had a similar reception. Philippine Tour Operators Association (Philtoa) president Fe Abling-Yu called the campaign "good enough" and said that one cannot go wrong with "love" as it can cover love for country, people, beaches and cuisine. The Philtoa official said that it could still be improved for "catchier and better name recall."

House Representative for Albay Joey Salceda, however, was critical of the lack of representation of his province and the wider Bicol Region in the initial campaign materials. He remarked that the Mayon volcano was not featured and presumed that the whale sharks featured represented Oslob, Cebu's rather than Bicol's. Tourism secretary Garcia-Frasco assured Salceda that his province would have a chance to be featured.
