= Wow Philippines =

Tourism marketing campaign of the Philippines

Wow Philippines (stylized as WOW Philippines) was a tourism marketing campaign used to promote tourism in the Philippines from 2002 to 2012. The name of the campaign also served as its tagline.

== Background ==
Then Department of Tourism secretary Richard Gordon conceptualized the tagline "Wow Philippines" himself in 2002. The government agency then had a limited budget allotted for advertising. The promotional campaign was based on the 24-month Visit Philippines 2003 campaign by the World Tourism Organization which aimed to encourage the Filipino diaspora to visit tourism sites in the Philippines.

The Department of Tourism (DOT) then commissioned advertising firm BBDO Guerrero for the implementation of the campaign. This includes the coming up with promotional materials and the addition of "More than the Usual" as a sub slogan. Also the "Wow" of the campaign slogan is meant to be capitalized which doubles as an acronym. The meaning of the acronym varies depending on the usage of the slogan according to the government agency. The following are some possible meanings given by the DOT are the following:

- Wealth of Wonders - tourist attractions
- Warm Over Winter - beaches
- Wild Over Water - water-based adventures
- Wacko Over Wildlife - indigenous flora and fauna
- Wear Our Wares
- Watch Our Whales - Whalesharks
- Walk Our Walls - Intramuros

== Impact and legacy ==
From 2003 to 2005, several tourism campaigns were conceptualized which include "Biyahe Tayo" (Pfizer and Perceptions Inc.), "I Love Philippines Biyahe Na!" (Smart) and "Pilipino sa Turismo'y Aktibo" (Philippine Tourism Authority, and ABS-CBN and its recording company Star Music). The following personalities from the entertainment and political field lent their popularity to promote tourism to mainstream audiences during that time:

- Freddie Aguilar
- Sharon Cuneta
- Ogie Alcasid
- Janno Gibbs
- Joey Ayala
- Rey Valera
- APO Hiking Society
- Jolina Magdangal
- Lea Salonga
- Jessa Zaragoza
- Francis Magalona
- Rico J. Puno
- April Boy Regino
- Paolo Santos
- Nina
- John Lesaca
- Rico Blanco
- Jong Cuenco
- Mike Villegas
- Regine Velasquez-Alcasid
- Gary Valenciano
- Jamie Rivera
- Ai-Ai delas Alas
- Piolo Pascual
- Heart Evangelista
- Vhong Navarro
- Erik Santos
- Sheryn Regis
- Karel Marquez
- Frenchie Dy
- Raki Vega
- Ella May Saison
- Lito Camo
- Angelica Jones
- Sandwich
- Gloc-9
- Akafellas
- Marinel Santos
- Dianne dela Fuente
- Maoui David
- Michelle Ayalde
- Aliyah Parcs
- Josh Santana
- Divo Bayer
- King
- Jonathan Badon
- Michael Cruz
- Johann Escanan
- Jericho Rosales (speaking only)
- Jiro Manio (speaking only)
- Roderick Paulate (speaking only)
- Kris Aquino (speaking only)
- Claudine Barretto (speaking only)
- Kuh Ledesma (speaking only)
- Charo Santos-Concio (speaking only)
- Dolphy (speaking only)
- Robert Dean S. Barbers (speaking only)
- Gloria Macapagal Arroyo (speaking only)

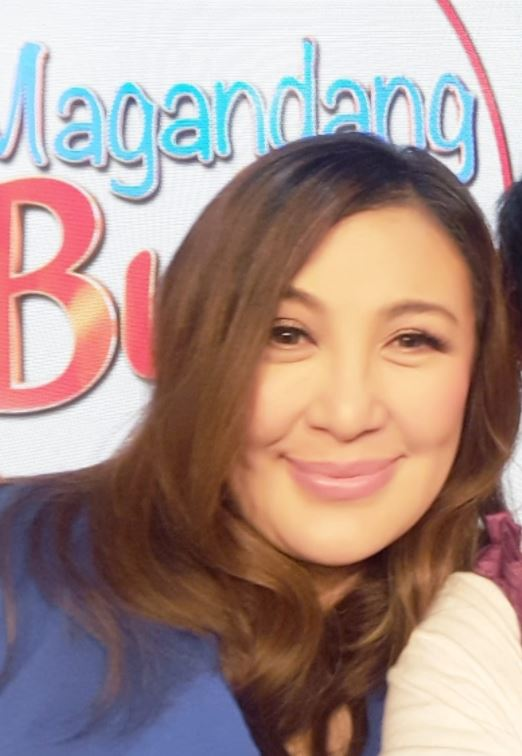
Sharon Cuneta

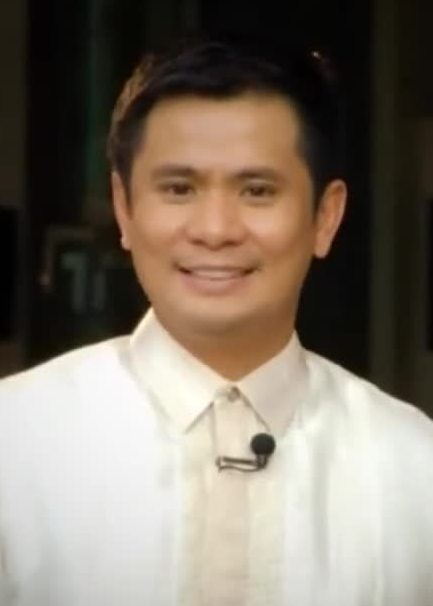
Ogie Alcasid

Rey Valera

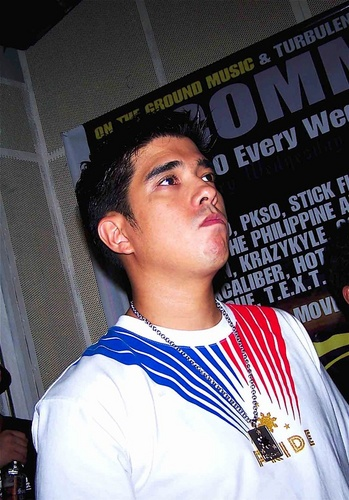
Francis Magalona

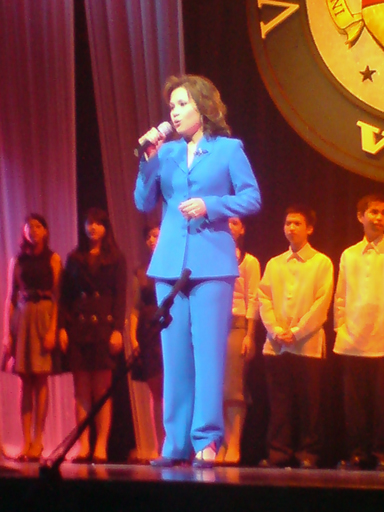
Lea Salonga

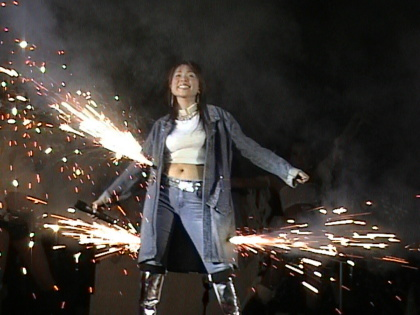
Nina

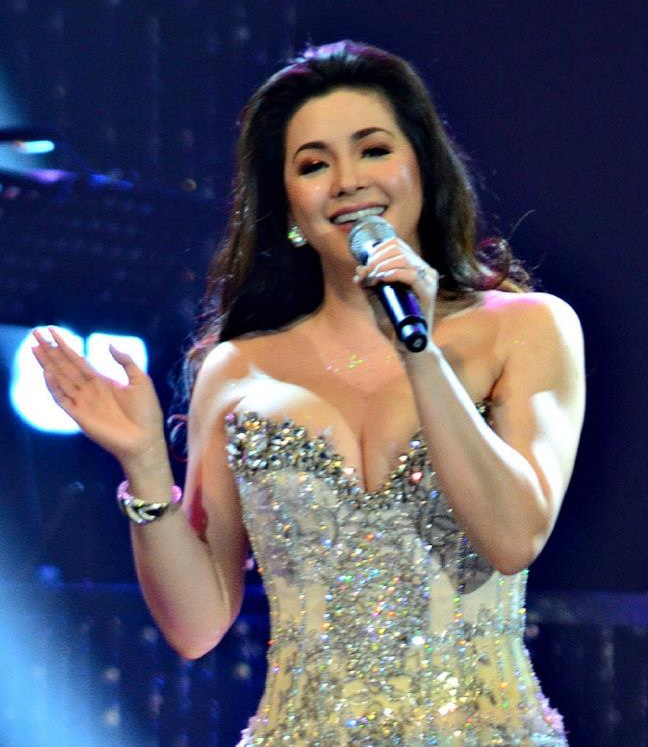
Regine Velasquez

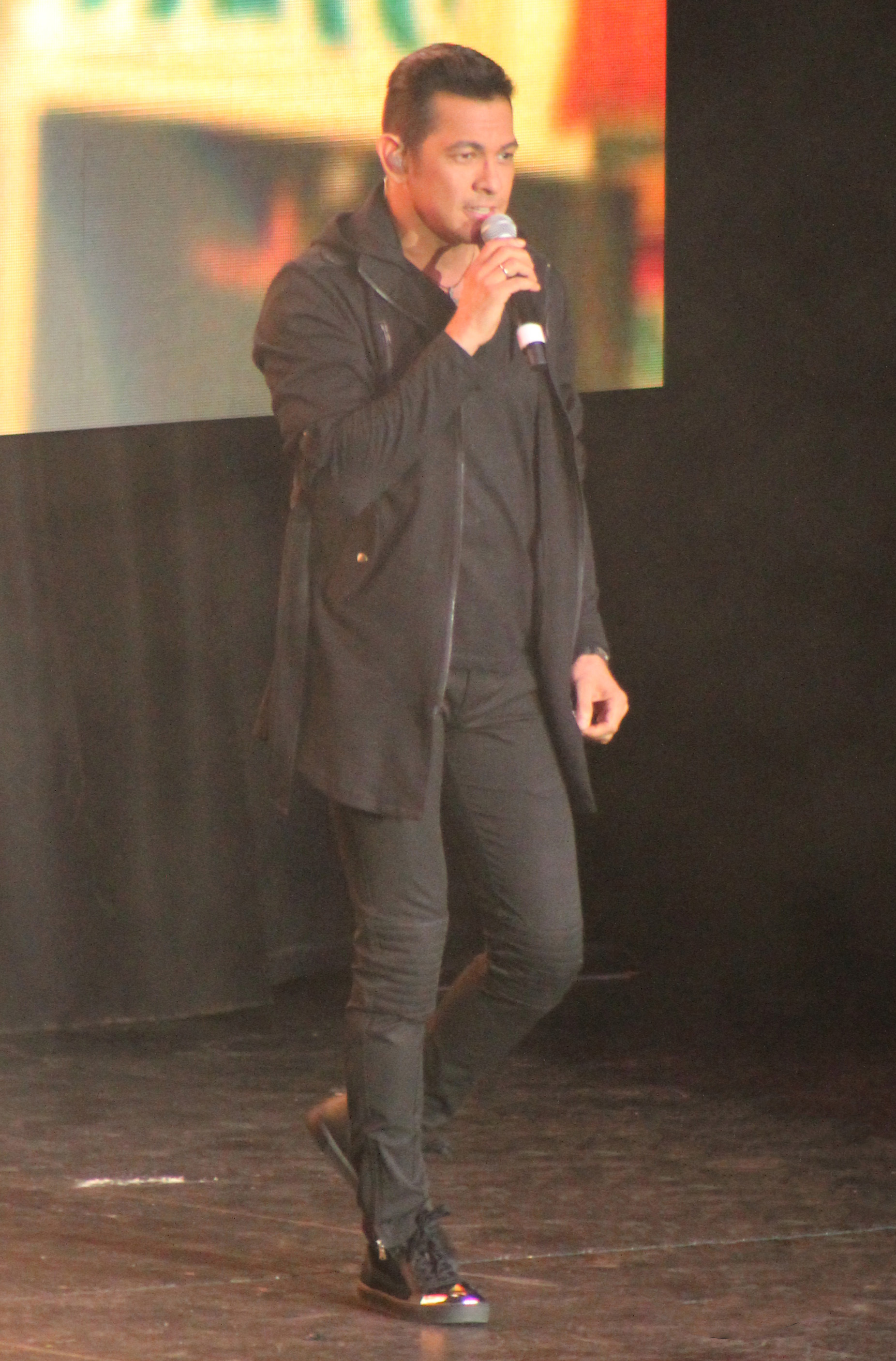
Gary Valenciano

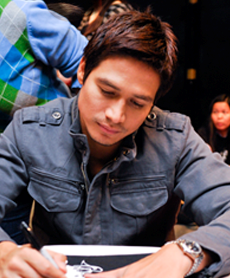
Piolo Pascual

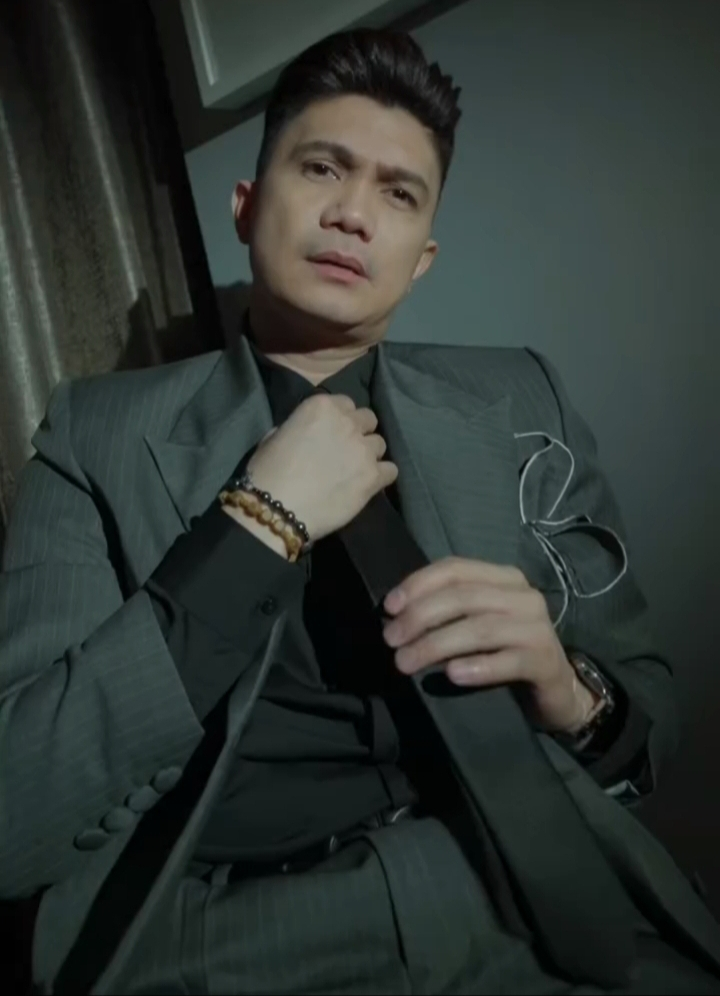
Vhong Navarro

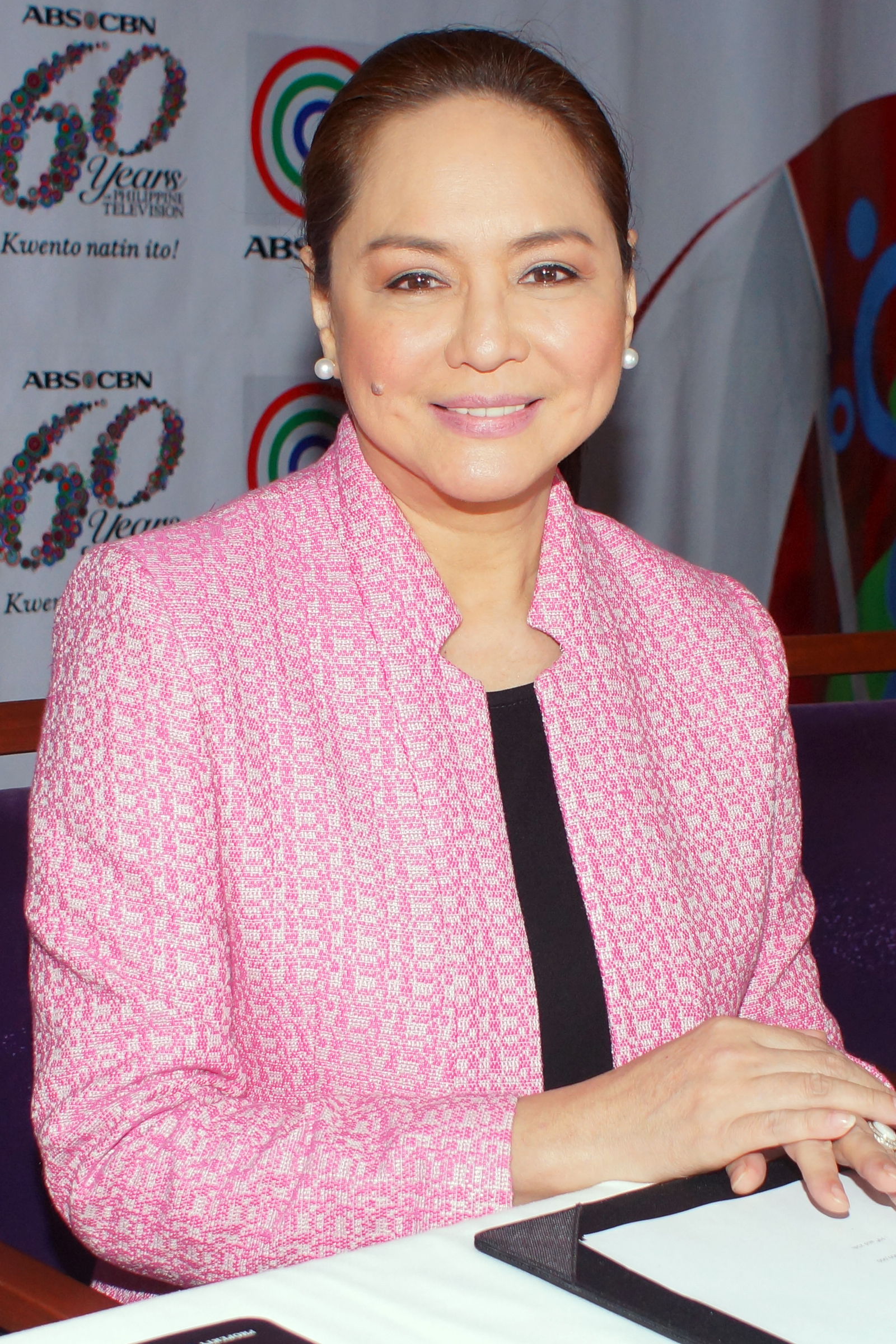
Charo Santos-Concio

Between 2007 and 2012, foreign visits in the Philippines increased from about 3 million to 4.27 million. The campaign also generated 2,800-4,000 jobs.

A remake of "Biyahe Tayo" was produced in 2011 and was re-titled as "Pilipinas, Tara Na!" and also had expanded lyrics with the addition of other artists including Pepe Smith, Zsa Zsa Padilla, Martin Nievera, Jaya, Kitchie Nadal, Kyla, Jay R, Christian Bautista, Billy Crawford, Aiza Seguerra, Nikki Gil, Yeng Constantino and Sam Concepcion among others, with additional spoken parts from Dolphy and Manny Pacquiao. A few of the artists were absorbed from the original version such as Gibbs, Alcasid, Jim Paredes and Boboy Garovillo (of the APO Hiking Society) and Villegas.

The campaign was also supported through music releases. In 2009, singer-actress Sheryl Cruz released the album There's No Place Like Home under Wow Music, a label associated with the campaign. Its lead single, "Luzviminda", was used as a theme song for the Department of Tourism's WOW Philippines campaign.

== Reception ==
In 2003, the Wow Philippines campaign was named as the Best Marketing Effort of a National Tourism Organization in the overall category in 2002 at the Internationale Tourismus Bourse.

== See also ==
- Pilipinas Kay Ganda
