= Destileria Limtuaco =

Filipino alcohol distillery and company

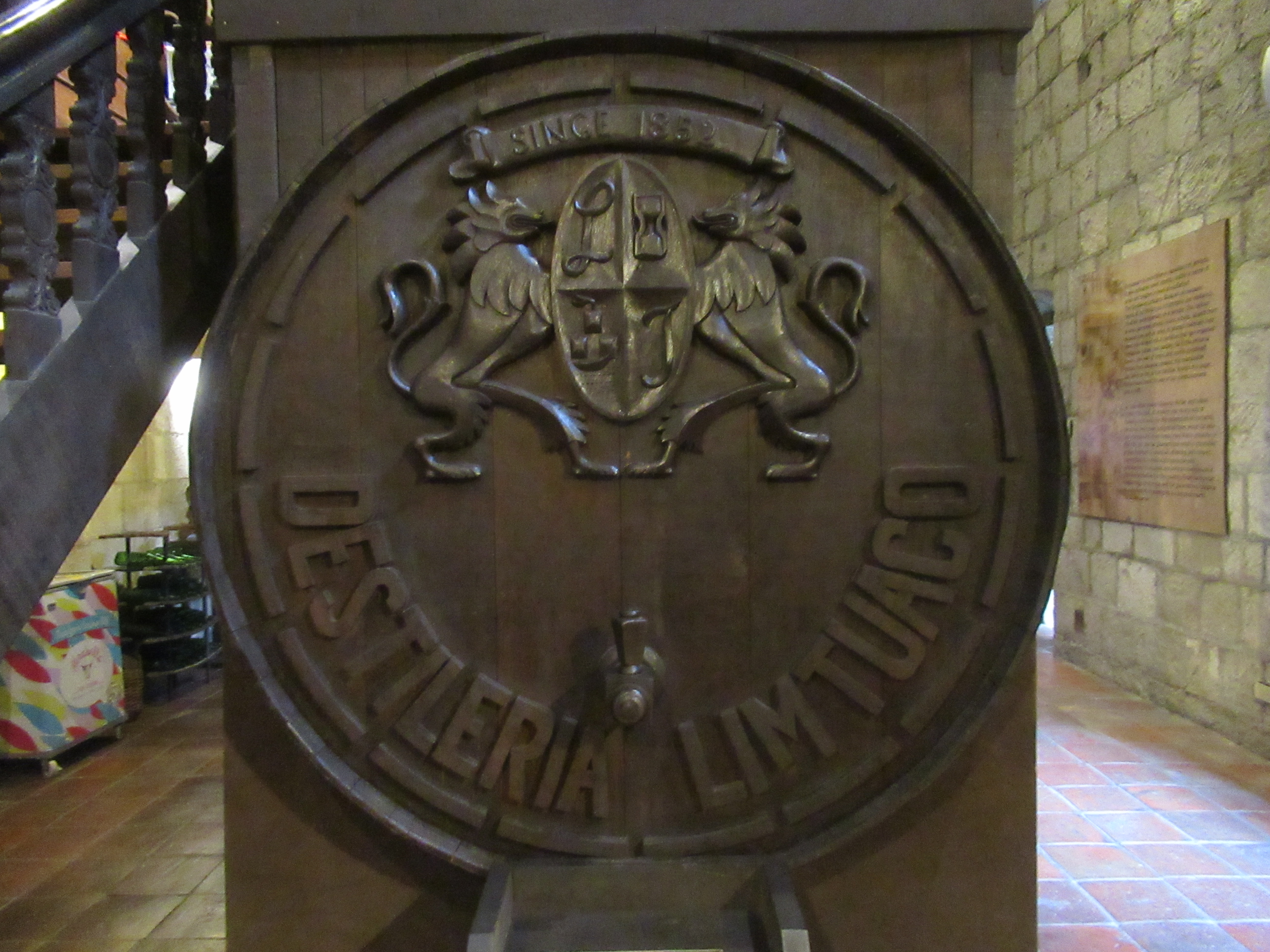
- Type: Corporation
- Industry: Alcoholic beverage
- Founded: 1852; 174 years ago
- Founder: Lim Tua Co (Bonifacio Limtuaco)
- Headquarters: Destileria Limtuaco Building, 1830 Epifanio Delos Santos Avenue, Quezon City, Philippines
- Area served: East Asia, Southeast Asia
- Key people: Olivia Limpe-Aw (Chairman, President & CEO)
- Products: Brandy, cocktails, gin, liqueur, rum, vodka, herbal wines, and disinfectant alcohol
- Website: www.limtuaco.com

Destileria Limtuaco & Co., Inc. is an alcohol distillery and company based in Manila, Philippines. It is known for being the oldest extant distillery in the Philippines.

== History ==
Destileria Limtuaco was established in 1852 during the Spanish colonial era by Chinese merchant and martial arts master Lim Tua Co, who was also known as Bonifacio Limtuaco. Lim Tua Co was an immigrant from Amoy in Qing China (modern-day Xiamen, China). He set up a small distillery along Gandara Street in Binondo, Manila, initially selling only Chinese herbal wine which later became known as sioktong.

Limtuaco was succeeded by his nephew, Lim Chay Seng. Limtuaco's son was not able to inherit the business, who died earlier while on a visit to Amoy. Under Lim Chay Seng, the distillery began introducing liquors which appealed to Americans.

Lim was succeeded by his son, James Limpe, who studied at the University of Washington in the United States. During World War II, the occupying Imperial Japanese forces seized control of the distillery for its strategic value, but not before Limpe destroyed the distillery's stocks. He was subsequently captured by the Japanese and incarcerated at Fort Bonifacio in retaliation for his actions, but was later released as part of pardons made in commemoration of Emperor Hirohito's birthday. After the war, Limpe introduced a more modern management system, and introduced vodka to the distillery's line of products.

Julius Limpe took over the family business in 1982 following the death of his father James. Julius had also studied in the United States like his father where he also learned distillery techniques. Under Julius Limpe, the distillery developed patents and built several plants. Destileria Limtuaco eventually became a major player in the alcohol beverage industry after he utilized marketing campaign to promote the distillery's products in several platforms including television. He also introduced White Castle Whisky, historically one of the distillery's well-received products.

The distillery experienced financial issues in the 1990s, following a labor strike which halted production for six months, and this negatively impacted its share in the domestic market. Revenue from exports saved the company from bankruptcy.

Julius Limpe turned over the company to his daughter Olivia Limpe-Aw in 2004 to pursue a career in visual arts. It was under Limpe-Aw's tenure that Destileria Limtuaco introduced the "Philippine Craft Spirits" line. By the 2010s, the export market of the distillery include China, Japan, South Korea, Malaysia, Thailand, and Taiwan.

The distillery gained the reputation of being the oldest in the Philippines for existing for at least a century.

Destileria Limtuaco opened a museum dedicated to its history on February 6, 2018. The museum is hosted inside a stone house in Intramuros, Manila.

In the early phase of the COVID-19 pandemic in 2020, Destileria Limtuaco introduced its own line of disinfectant alcohol in anticipation of lowered demand for alcoholic beverages. Sales of its alcoholic beverages were expectedly affected by the pandemic due to the temporary closure of bars as part of community quarantines measures.

== Products ==
Destileria Limtuaco's first product is Siok Hoc Tong, a Chinese herbal tonic. The distillery is also known for its White Castle Whisky, which was largely marketed on television in the 1970s; its advertisements are usually featuring a young lady in red bikini accompanied by a white horse.

The distillery also started developing Philippine craft spirits in the 2000s, which are meant to be souvenirs. The distillery began developing its craft spirits after company president Olivia Limpe-Aw often receives request from buyers for "something distinctly Filipino" when executives join business junkets abroad. The first of the distillery's craft spirits was the Paradise Mango Rum introduced in 2002, which initially had poor domestic reception due to expectations that locally produced alcohol should be cheap. The product eventually gained traction as a pasalubong or gift of Filipinos for their foreign friends due to its bottle design.

Other craft spirits include the Amadeo Coffee Liqueur, a coffee based alcohol named after the town of Amadeo, Cavite which is reputed to be the "Coffee Capital of the Philippines"; the Manille Liqueur de Calamansi and Manille Liqueur de Dalandan, the Very Old Captain Artisan Crafted Dark Rum, Vigan Basi (sugarcane wine) which was made in cooperation with the local government of La Union, and the San Juan Lambanog, a palm liquor sourced from San Juan, Batangas.

== Museum ==
Destileria Limtuaco hosts its own museum which opened on February 6, 2018. It is hosted inside a stone house along San Juan de Letran Street in Intramuros, Manila, and is dedicated to the company's history and liquor making. The stone house was bought by the distillery during the management of Julius Limpe in 1979. There were plans back then to convert the building to a museum but progress on the project was stalled from 1989 to 2004 until it was continued by Limpe's daughter, Olivia Limpe-Aw. The museum features exhibits featuring the liquor distillery and bottle-making processes, and a section dedicated to the distillery's flagship brand White Castle Whisky. It also hosts 120 bottles of Destileria Limtuaco's products, including its first product Siok Hoc Tong, with the oldest bottle dating back to the 1920s.

== Gallery ==
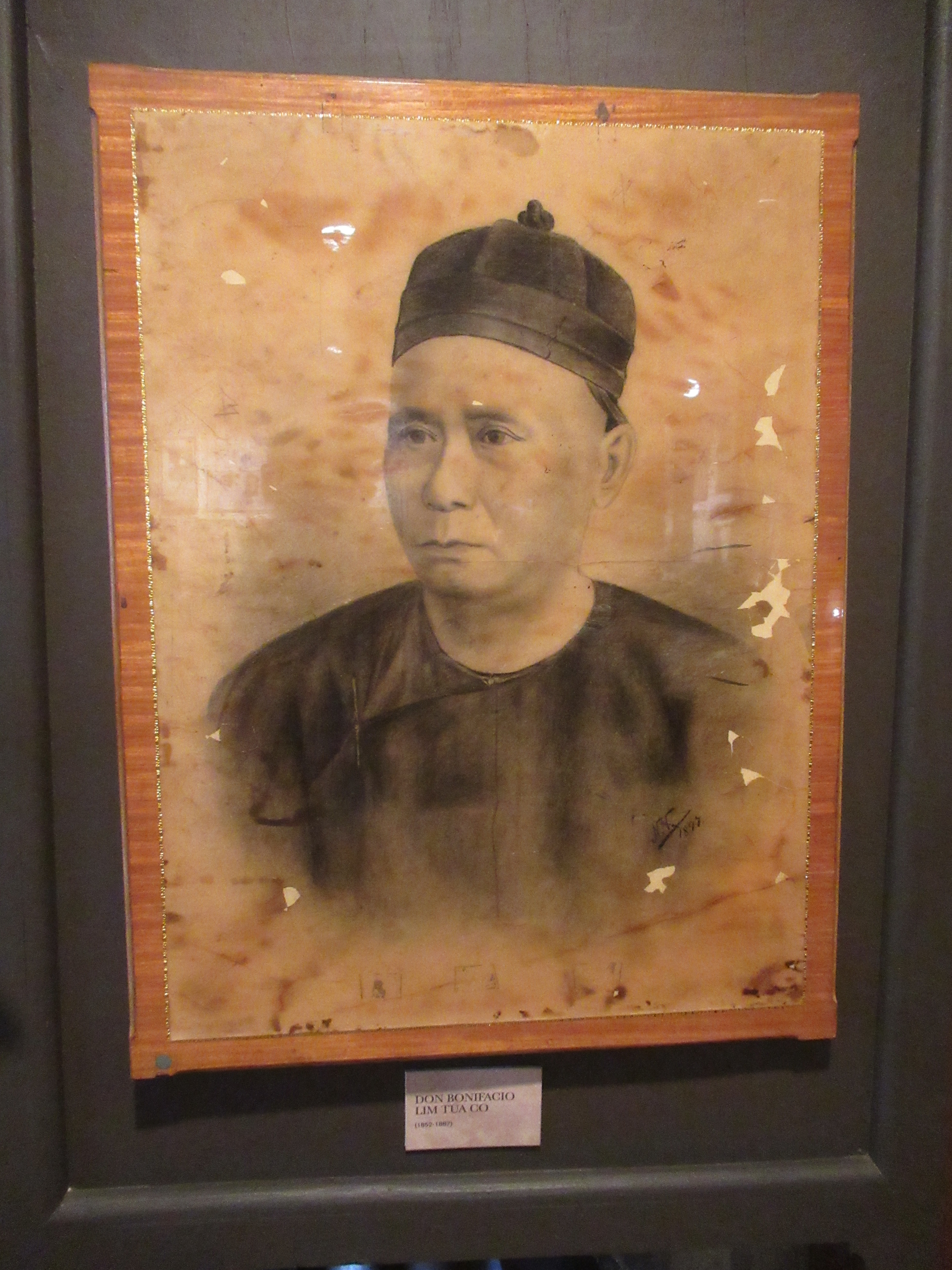
Bonifacio Limtuaco

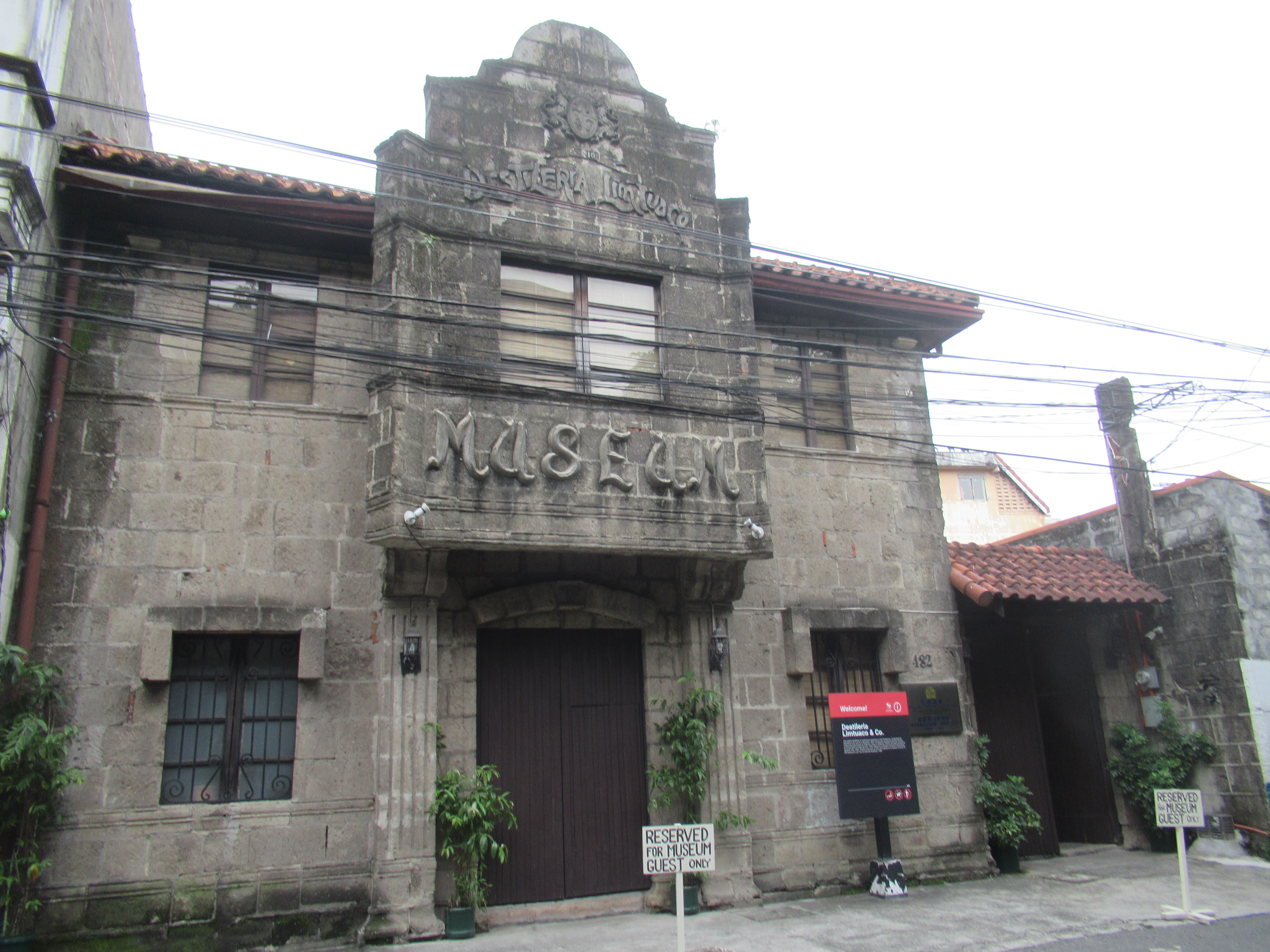
Museum in 2023

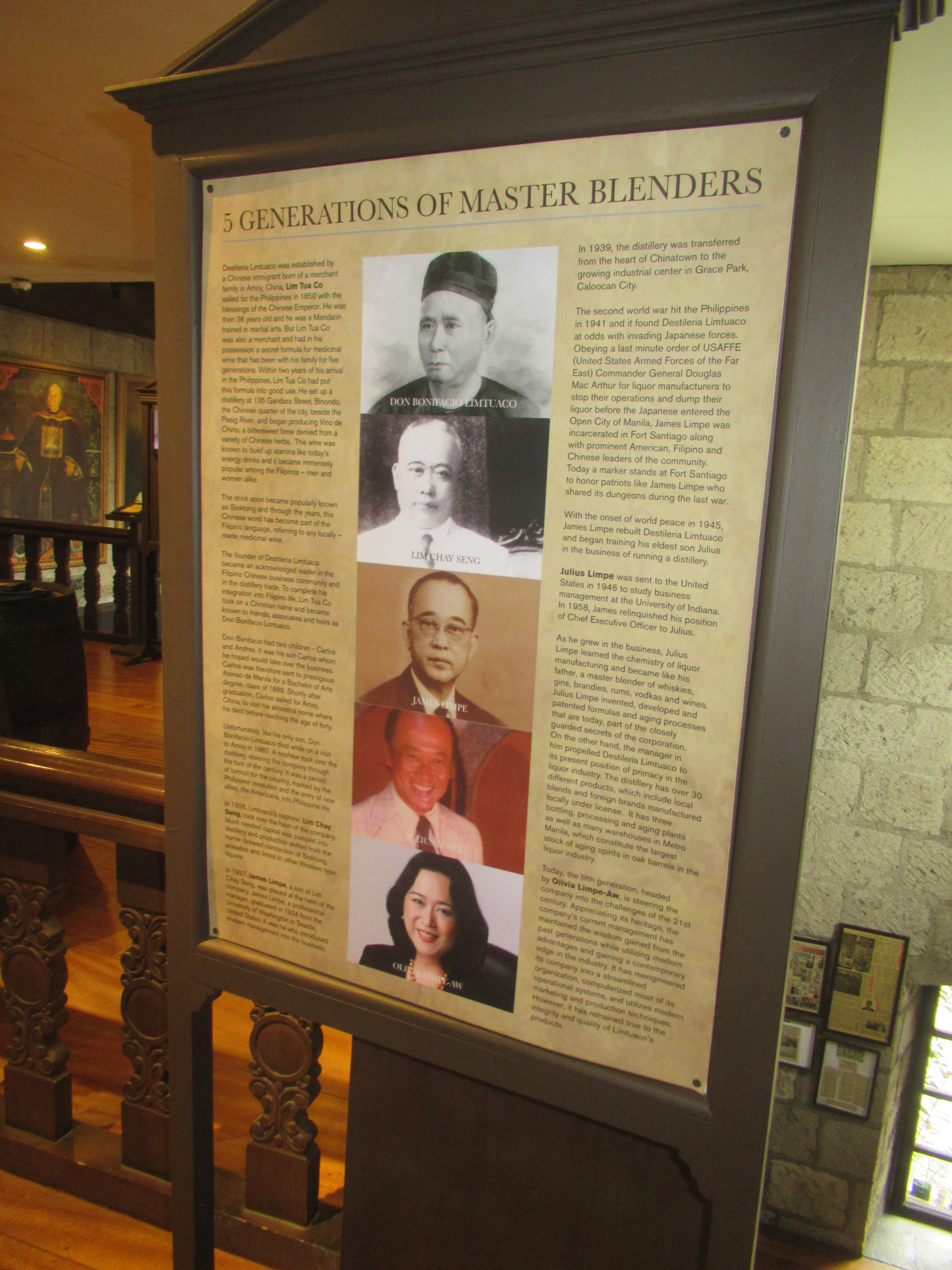
The 5 generations
