= Department of Tourism (Philippines) =

Executive department of the Philippine government

- Kagawaran ng Turismo
- Seal of the Department of Tourism

- Flag of the Department of Tourism

- DOT Building, home of the Department of Tourism headquarters

Department overview
- Formed: May 11, 1973; 53 years ago
- Headquarters: IPO Building, 351 Sen. Gil J. Puyat Avenue, Bel-Air, Makati
- Employees: 527 (2024)
- Annual budget: ₱3.08 billion (2025)
- Department executives: Dita Angara-Mathay, Secretary; Atty. Mae Elaine T. Bathan, Undersecretary for Legal and Special Concerns and Chief of Staff, Office of the Secretary; Atty. Glenn Albert M. Ocampo, Head Executive Assistant, Office of the Secretary
- Website: tourism.gov.ph

The Department of Tourism (DOT; Filipino: Kagawaran ng Turismo) is the executive department of the Philippine government responsible for the regulation of the Philippine tourism industry and the promotion of the Philippines as a tourist destination.

== History ==
Started as a private initiative to promote the Philippines as a major travel destination, the Philippine Tourist & Travel Association was organized in 1950. In 1956, the Board of Travel and Tourist Industry was created by Congress as stipulated in the Integrated Reorganization Plan. In 1972, sanctioned as law under Presidential Decree No. 2, as amended, the Department of Trade and Tourism was established, reorganizing the then Department of Commerce and Industry. A Philippine Tourism Commission was created under the unified Trade and Tourism Department to oversee the growth of the tourism industry as a source of economic benefit for the country.

In 1973, President Ferdinand Marcos created a new cabinet-level Department of Tourism (DOT) by splitting the Department of Trade and Tourism into two separate departments. Included in the new Department of Tourism were the newly created Philippine Tourism Authority (PTA) and Philippine Convention Bureau (PCB). The Department of Tourism was then renamed Ministry of Tourism as a result of the shift in the form of government pursuant to the enforcement of the 1973 Constitution.

In 1986, under Executive Orders 120 and 120-A signed by President Corazon Aquino, the Department of Tourism was reorganized and, correspondingly, the Convention Bureau was renamed the Philippine Convention and Visitors Corporation, and the Intramuros Administration was attached, previously being under the defunct Ministry of Human Settlements. In 1998, the Department of Tourism assumed a prominent role in the culmination of centennial celebration of the country's independence from the Spanish Empire in 1898.

In 2003, the Department of Tourism initiated one of its most successful tourism promotion projects, Wow Philippines, under Secretary Richard Gordon.

The latest improvements in the tourism industry in the country came about with the passage of Republic Act No. 9593 or the "Tourism Act of 2009."

== Organization structure ==
The department is headed by the secretary of tourism, with the following five undersecretaries and assistant secretaries.

- Undersecretary for Administration and Finance
- Undersecretary for Public Affairs, Communications & Special Projects
- Undersecretary for Tourism Development Planning
- Undersecretary for Tourism Promotions
- Undersecretary for Tourism Regulation Coordination & Resource Generations
- Assistant Secretary for Administration and Finance
- Assistant Secretary for Public Affairs, Communications and Special Projects
- Assistant Secretary for Product and Market Development
- Assistant Secretary for Tourism Regulation Coordination & Resource Generation for Metro Manila Cluster
- Assistant Secretary for Tourism Regulation Coordination & Resource Generation for Luzon and Visayas

== Bureaus and offices ==
- Bureau of Domestic Tourism Promotions and Information
- Bureau of International Tourism Promotions
- Office of Product Development
- Office of Tourism Coordination
- Office of Tourism Development Planning
- Office of Tourism Information
- Office of Tourism Standards

== Agencies of the Department of Tourism ==
Also known as the "DOT Family", the following agencies are attached to the DOT and shall be under the supervision of the secretary for program and policy coordination:

- Tourism Promotions Board (TPB)
- Intramuros Administration (IA)
- National Parks Development Committee (NPDC)
- Tourism Infrastructure and Enterprise Zone Authority (TIEZA), formerly Philippine Tourism Authority (PTA)
- Duty-Free Philippines Corporation (DFPC)
- Nayong Pilipino Foundation (NPF)
- Philippine Retirement Authority (PRA)
- Philippine Commission on Sports Scuba Diving (PCSSD)

== Tourism projects ==
- Visit Islands Philippines 1994
- Miss Universe 1994 (43rd Miss Universe)
- Florikultura '98 – international horticulture exhibition
- Expo Pilipino 1998 – Philippine Centennial International Exposition
- 1998 Philippine Centennial Celebrations
- World Exposition 2002 Manila (cancelled due to financial problems of the government)
- Visit Philippines 2003
- Visit the Philippines Year 2015
- Visit the Philippines Again 2016
- Miss Universe 2016 (65th Miss Universe)
- Boracay Rehabilitation 2018
- 2019 Southeast Asian Games

== Tourism slogans ==
- WOW Philippines (2002)
- Pilipinas Kay Ganda (2010)
- It's More Fun in the Philippines! (2012)
- Love the Philippines (2023)
