= Typhoon Kalmaegi =

Pacific typhoon in 2025

Typhoon Kalmaegi (Tino)
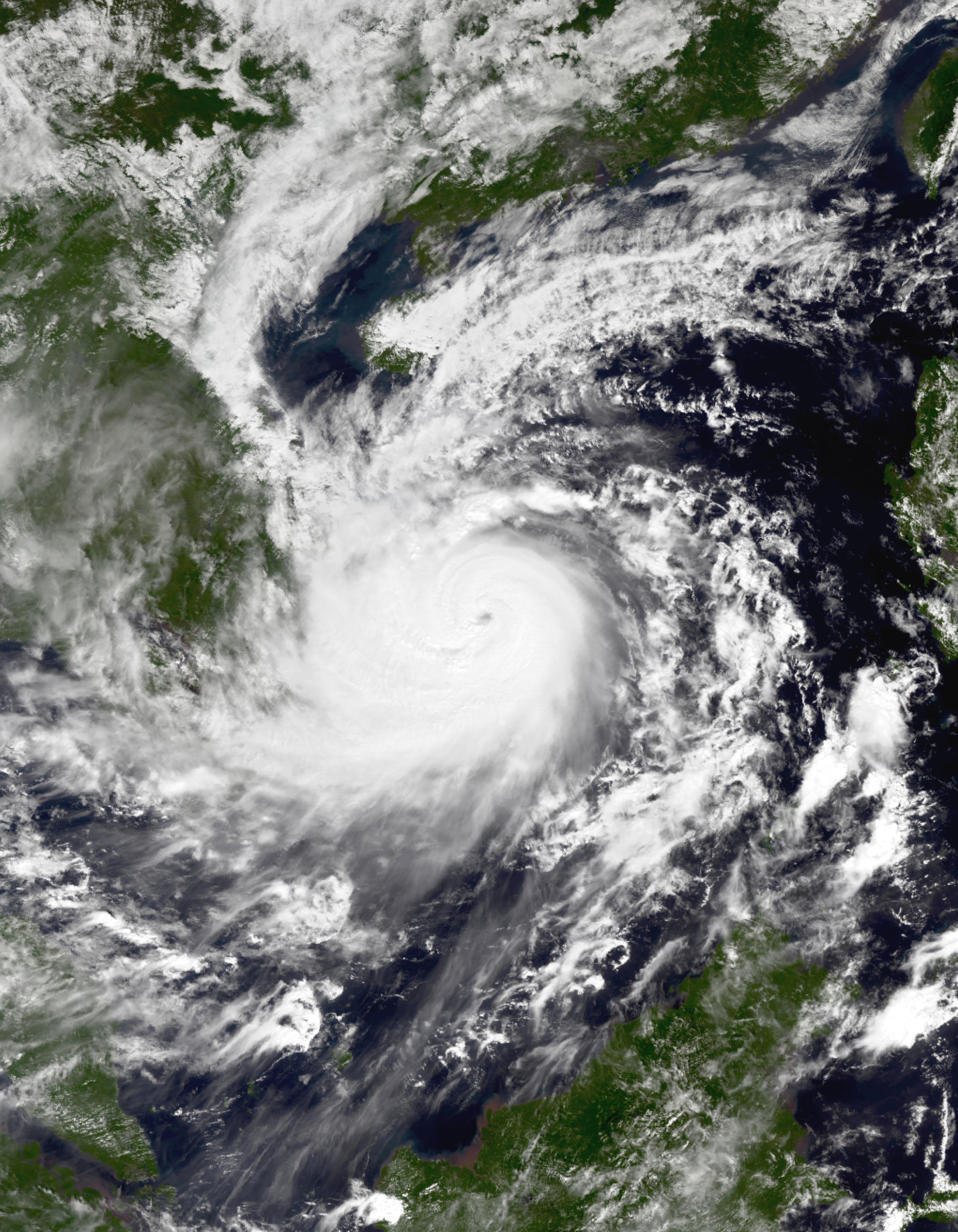
- Kalmaegi at peak intensity while approaching Vietnam on November 6

Meteorological history
- Formed: October 31, 2025
- Dissipated: November 7, 2025

Very strong typhoon
- 10-minute sustained (JMA)
- Highest winds: 165 km/h (105 mph)
- Lowest pressure: 950 hPa (mbar); 28.05 inHg

Category 4-equivalent typhoon
- 1-minute sustained (SSHWS/JTWC)
- Highest winds: 215 km/h (130 mph)
- Lowest pressure: 947 hPa (mbar); 27.96 inHg

Overall effects
- Fatalities: 288
- Injuries: 549
- Missing: 113
- Damage: ≥$588 million (2025 USD)
- Areas affected: Philippines; particularly Visayas; Vietnam; Thailand
- Part of the 2025 Pacific typhoon season

Typhoon Kalmaegi, (Note: The name Kalmaegi (Korean: 갈매기, [ka̠ɭmɛɡi]) was contributed by North Korea and means seagull in Korean.) known in the Philippines as Typhoon Tino, was a strong, deadly and extremely impactful tropical cyclone that affected portions of the central Philippines, particularly in Cebu, causing freshwater flooding due to record-breaking rains. It later struck Central Vietnam as one of the strongest typhoons on record in the area during early November 2025. The deadliest typhoon to strike the Visayas since Typhoon Rai in 2021, Kalmaegi is the twenty-fifth named storm and eleventh typhoon of the 2025 Pacific typhoon season.

Kalmaegi originated from an area of convection on October 30. The following day, it was later classified as a tropical depression as the Joint Typhoon Warning Center (JTWC) issued a Tropical Cyclone Formation Alert (TCFA) at 02:00 UTC. At 12:00 UTC, the Japan Meteorological Agency (JMA) upgraded the system to a tropical storm and assigned it the name Kalmaegi, as environmental conditions became increasingly favorable for development. The JTWC followed suit at 21:00 UTC, also designating it as a tropical storm. The system entered the Philippine Area of Responsibility (PAR) at 05:30 PHT on November 2 (21:30 UTC on the previous day) and was named Tino by the Philippine Atmospheric, Geophysical, and Astronomical Services Administration (PAGASA). At 12:00 UTC, the JMA upgraded Kalmaegi to a severe tropical storm. By 03:00 UTC on November 3, PAGASA, the JTWC, and the JMA all upgraded the system to typhoon status, citing a highly favorable environment for rapid intensification.

Tropical Cyclone Wind Signal No. 4, indicating potential winds of 118–184 km/h (73–114 mph), was raised in numerous areas. Kalmaegi generated strong winds and flooding that left at least 269 people dead, 523 injured and 113 others missing in the Philippines, mostly in Cebu, with 13 additional fatalities in Thailand and six more in Vietnam.

== Meteorological history ==
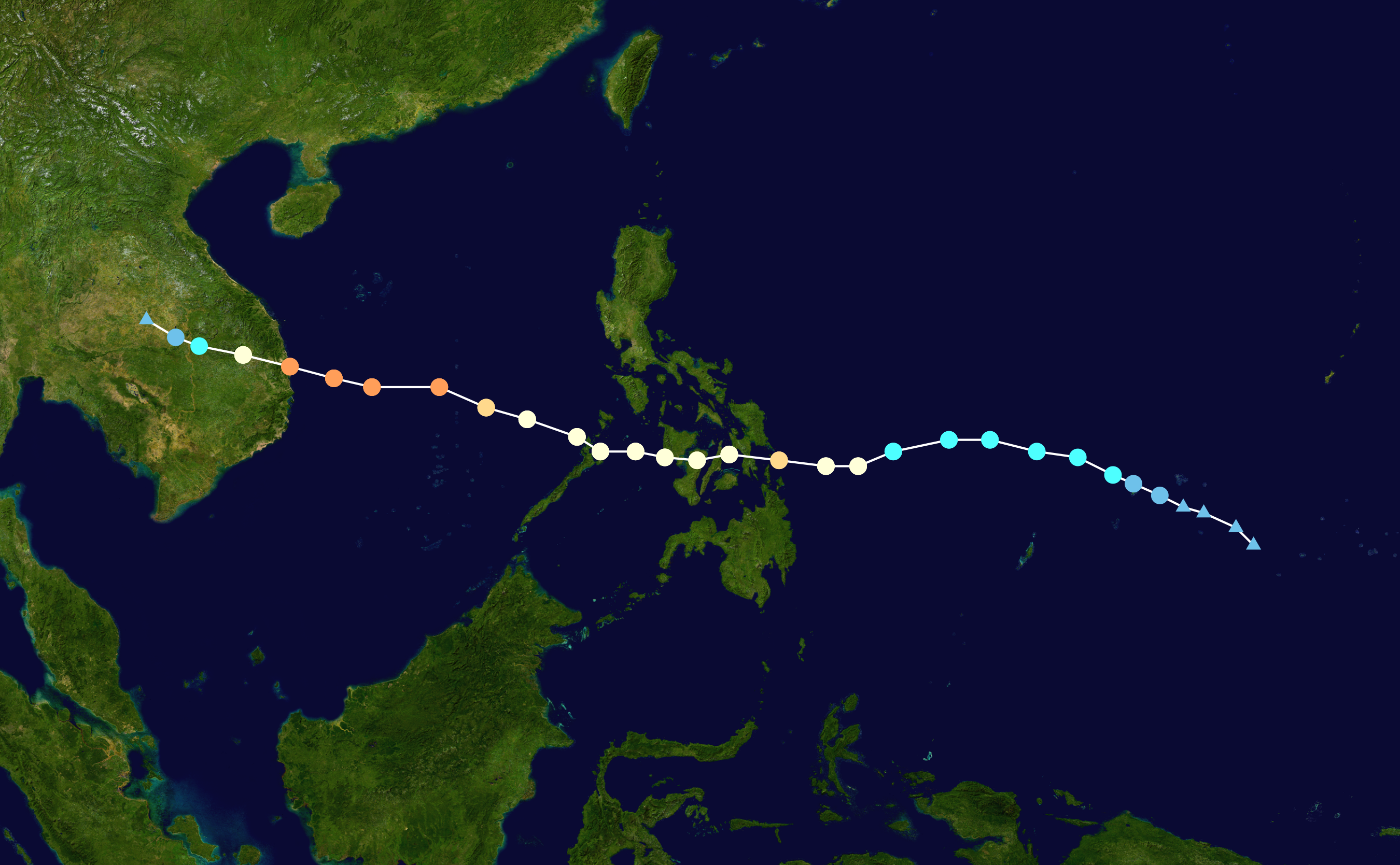
Map plotting the storm's track and intensity, according to the Saffir–Simpson scale Map key Saffir–Simpson scale Tropical depression (≤38 mph, ≤62 km/h) Tropical storm (39–73 mph, 63–118 km/h) Category 1 (74–95 mph, 119–153 km/h) Category 2 (96–110 mph, 154–177 km/h) Category 3 (111–129 mph, 178–208 km/h) Category 4 (130–156 mph, 209–251 km/h) Category 5 (≥157 mph, ≥252 km/h) Unknown Storm type Tropical cyclone Subtropical cyclone Extratropical cyclone, remnant low, tropical disturbance, or monsoon depression

Kalmaegi originated from an area of strong convection that developed on October 30, located about 313 nautical miles (580 km) east-southeast of Yap. Satellite imagery showed cycling deep convection over a poorly organized low-level circulation center (LLCC). The disturbance was embedded in a favorable environment for tropical cyclogenesis, with low wind shear and warm sea surface temperatures (SSTs). On the following day, the JMA classified the system as a tropical depression as its LLCC slowly consolidated. The JTWC noted that the depression remained in an environment conducive for further development, characterized by light vertical wind shear and warm SSTs. Around 05:00 PHT (21:00 UTC on the previous day) on November 1, PAGASA also classified the system as a tropical depression.

The JTWC issued a TCFA at around 02:00 UTC on November 1, citing a high probability of further development as the system moved west-northwestward. The JTWC noted a broad low-level circulation center (LLCC) with convection concentrated north of the center and some curved banding features. Favorable environmental conditions persisted, supported by good poleward outflow. As the LLCC gradually consolidated and convective banding wrapped around its northern semicircle, the system began tracking northwestward along the southwestern edge of a subtropical ridge. At 06:00 UTC, the JMA noted that, while the system remained in a favorable environment, the limited organization of its structure caused it to maintain its intensity for several hours. The JTWC later designated the system as 31W at 09:00 UTC. At around 12:00 UTC, the JMA upgraded 31W to a tropical storm, assigning it the name Kalmaegi. The JTWC observed a symmetric central dense overcast (CDO) enveloping the LLCC and described the system as compact as it tracked along the southern periphery of a subtropical ridge located to the northeast. By 21:00 UTC, the JTWC also classified Kalmaegi as a tropical storm, citing an expanding CDO and a highly favorable environment for further intensification. The storm later entered the PAR at 05:30 PHT on November 2 (the day before at 21:30 UTC) and was given the local name Tino. Satellite imagery showed robust radial outflow and intense central convection, with the deepest convection concentrated over the northern and western semicircles.

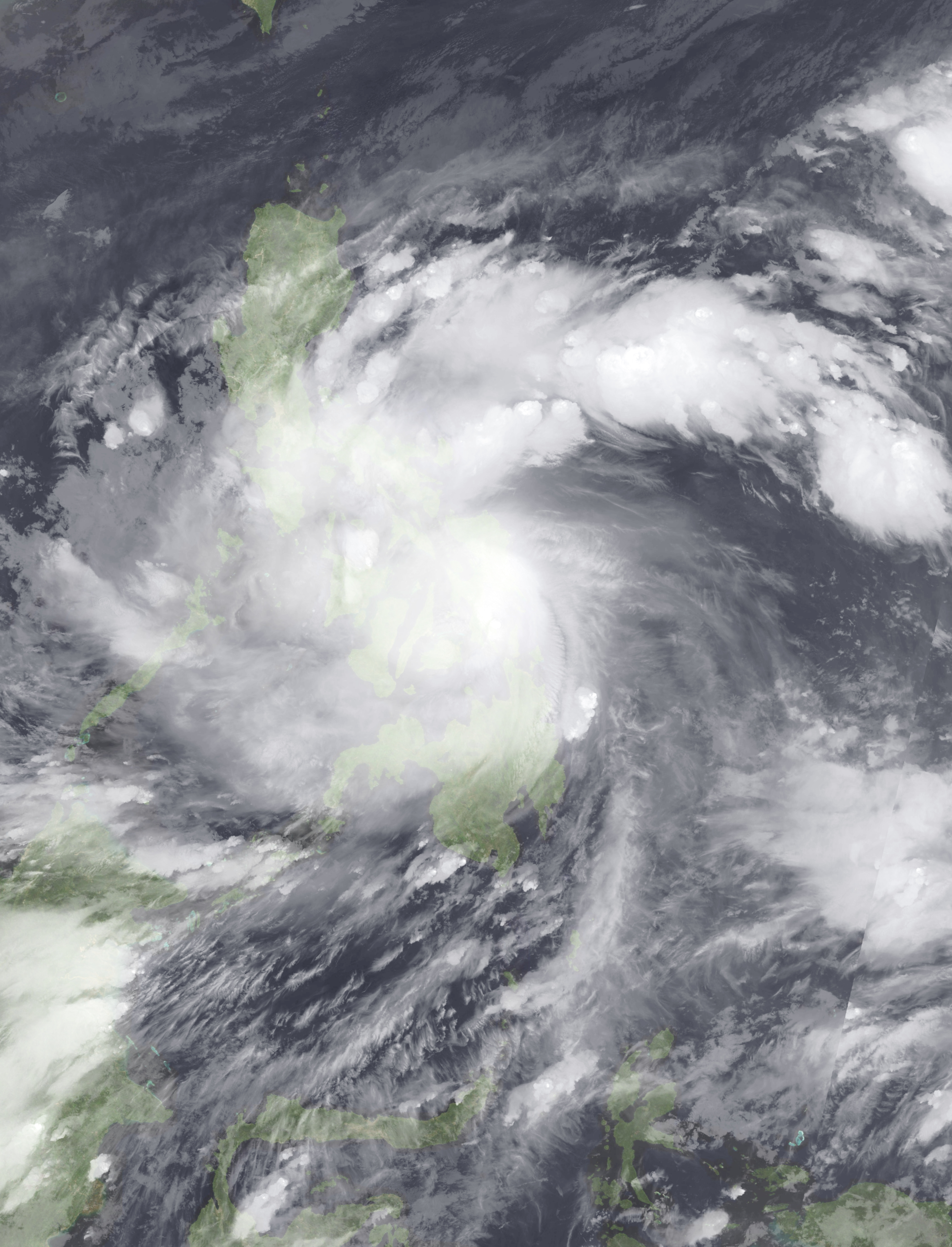
Kalmaegi approaching the Philippines on November 5

At 17:00 PHT (09:00 UTC), PAGASA upgraded Kalmaegi to a severe tropical storm. The JMA noted a brief slowdown in intensification before the system resumed strengthening. According to the JTWC, deep convective bursts developed over the center, with a banding feature forming to the north. Microwave imagery showed a small, forming eye and strong convection displaced slightly to the south, indicating increasingly favorable conditions for further intensification. Three hours later, the JMA also upgraded Kalmaegi to a severe tropical storm. The JTWC noted two distinct clusters of deep convection forming an oblong-shaped CDO. By 18:00 UTC, two lobes became apparent: the southeastern lobe was centered over the low-level circulation and served as the primary region of deep convection, while the northwestern lobe exhibited strong poleward outflow. At 03:00 UTC on November 3, the JTWC upgraded Kalmaegi to a typhoon, citing a consistently favorable environment and strong outflow supported by trade winds. Multispectral satellite imagery showed a compact core with deep convection wrapping closely around the center. At the same time, the JMA and PAGASA also upgraded the system to a typhoon when it was approximately 368 nautical miles (682 km) north-northeast of Sonsorol. The JTWC later noted that deep convection wrapped around the core but an eye failed to develop due to persistent northeasterly wind shear, despite otherwise favorable conditions.

Kalmaegi approaching Vietnam on November 6

On November 4, Kalmaegi intensified into a Category 2-equivalent typhoon before making landfall in Silago, Southern Leyte at around 00:00 PHT (16:00 UTC). It then weakened back into a Category 1 typhoon due to land interaction. The system went on to make three additional landfalls in Borbon, Cebu, Sagay, Negros Occidental, and San Lorenzo, Guimaras at 05:10 PHT (21:10 UTC), 06:40 PHT (22:40 UTC), and 11:10 PHT (03:10 UTC), respectively. The repeated landfalls caused Kalmaegi to slightly weaken and slow as it moved into the Iloilo Strait. At 13:20 PHT (05:20 UTC), Kalmaegi made its fifth landfall over Iloilo City. It then made a sixth landfall in Magsaysay in the Cuyo Archipelago at 19:30 PHT (11:30 UTC). At 04:10 PHT (20:10 UTC) on November 5, Kalmaegi made its seventh landfall over Batas Island in Taytay, Palawan, followed by an eighth landfall at 04:40 PHT (20:40 UTC) over El Nido, Palawan. Subsequently, Kalmaegi emerged over the South China Sea, where it began reorganizing under favorable oceanic and atmospheric conditions, with satellite imagery showing improved structure and strengthening convection. It rapidly intensified under favorable conditions, and the JTWC upgraded the storm into a Category 3-equivalent typhoon as a broad region of diffluent outflow developed and a ragged eye formed. The JMA soon followed suit and upgraded Kalmaegi into a very strong typhoon. The JTWC, on November 6, noted that Kalmaegi began to gradually weaken on approach to Vietnam due to northeasterly wind shear, although the environment remained marginally favorable, and satellite imagery continued to show a well-defined eye. Later that day, Kalmaegi moved inland over the provinces of Gia Lai and Đắk Lắk in southern Central Vietnam, with its center crossing near the northern part of Sông Cầu in Đắk Lắk. (Note: Prior to July 1, 2025, Sông Cầu was part of Phú Yên Province. Following the administrative reorganization under the Plan to Arrange and Merge Administrative Units during 2024–2025, Phú Yên was merged into Đắk Lắk.) Subsequent interaction with the mountainous terrain rapidly disrupted the typhoon's structure, prompting the JTWC to issue its final warning at 15:00 UTC as it moved west-northwestward. At 18:00 UTC, the JMA downgraded the system to a severe tropical storm. Three hours later, the storm was downgraded again into a tropical storm before fully dissipating on November 7.

Two stations in Vietnam recorded the lowest sea-level atmospheric pressure during Typhoon Kalmaegi's impact lower than 975 hPa. An Nhơn weather station, located in Gia Lai province, recorded 973.2 hPa, and Quy Nhon weather station, also in Gia Lai province, recorded 967 hPa.

== Preparations ==
=== Philippines ===
==== Highest Tropical Cyclone Wind Signal ====
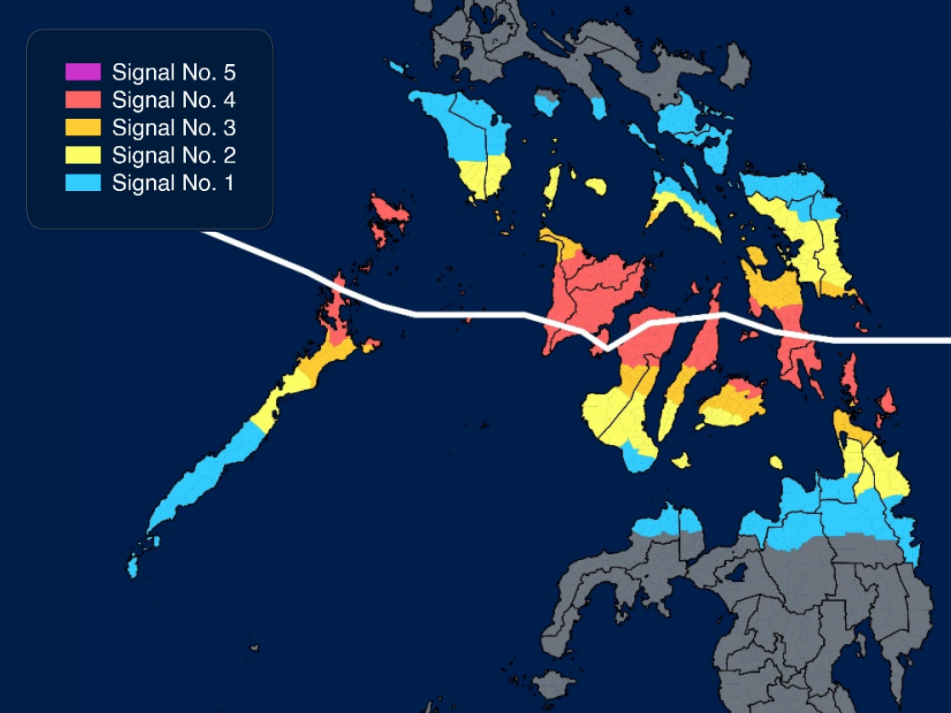
Highest Tropical Cyclone Wind Signal issued by PAGASA for Kalmaegi (Tino) in each province. The white line represents the best track.

TCWS#	Luzon	Visayas	Mindanao
4	Calamian Islands, Cuyo Islands, Extreme Northern Portion of Palawan	Capiz, Guimaras, Iloilo, Central and Southern Portions of Antique, Southern Portion of Aklan, Extreme Northern Portion of Negros Oriental, Northern Portion of Negros Occidental, Bantayan Islands, Northern Portion of Cebu, Northern Portion of Bohol, Camotes Islands, Central and Southern Portion of Leyte, Southern Leyte, Extreme Southeastern Portion of Eastern Samar	Bucas Grande Islands, Dinagat Islands, Siargao Islands
3	Northern Portion of Palawan, Southwestern Portion of Masbate	Rest of Aklan, Rest of Antique, Central Portion of Negros Occidental, Northern Portion of Negros Oriental, Central Portion of Bohol, Central Portion of Cebu, Biliran, Rest of Leyte, Southern Portion of Eastern Samar	Surigao del Norte
2	Cagayancillo Islands, Central Portion of Palawan, Romblon, Southern Portion of Occidental Mindoro, Southern Portion of Oriental Mindoro, Central Portion of Masbate	Rest of Negros Occidental, Central Portion of Negros Oriental, Rest of Bohol, Rest of Cebu, Siquijor, Central and Southern Portions of Samar, Central Portion of Eastern Samar	Northern Portion of Surigao del Sur, Northern Portion of Agusan del Norte, Northern Portion of Agusan del Sur, Camiguin
1	Lubang Islands, Rest of Occidental Mindoro, Rest of Oriental Mindoro, Rest of Palawan, Southern Portion of Marinduque, Southwestern Portion of Quezon, Albay, Burias Island, Rest of Masbate, Sorsogon, Ticao Island	Rest of Negros Oriental, Northern Samar, Rest of Eastern Samar, Rest of Samar	Rest of Surigao del Sur, Central Portion of Agusan del Sur, Rest of Agusan del Norte, Northern Portion of Bukidnon, Misamis Oriental, Northern Portion of Misamis Occidental, Northern Portion of Zamboanga del Norte,

At 11:00 PHT (03:00 UTC) on November 2, PAGASA issued Tropical Cyclone Wind Signal No. 1, indicating winds of 24 to 38 mph (39 to 61 km/h) after at least 36 hours, over Eastern Samar, Dinagat Islands, Siargao Island, and Bucas Grande Island. Six hours later, seven more provinces across the Visayas and Mindanao were added under Signal No. 1. At 23:00 PHT (15:00 UTC), Guiuan, Salcedo, and Mercedes in Eastern Samar, alongside Siargao Island and Bucas Grande Island, were raised to Signal No. 2, indicating winds of 62 to 88 km/h (39 to 55 mph) after at least 24 hours, while additional areas were also placed under Signal No. 1. By 05:00 PHT on November 3 (21:00 UTC on November 2), Signal No. 2 was extended to eleven more provinces.

At 08:00 PHT (00:00 UTC), Guiuan, Mercedes, Dinagat Islands, Siargao Island, and Bucas Grande Island were all elevated to Signal No. 3, signifying winds of 89 to 117 km/h (55 to 73 mph) after at least 18 hours. At 11:00 PHT (03:00 UTC), the southern part of Eastern Samar, Marabut in Samar, the central and southern portions of Leyte, Southern Leyte, Camotes Islands, the eastern portion of Bohol, Dinagat Islands, and the northern portion of Surigao del Norte were also placed under Signal No. 3. Three hours later, Dinagat Islands, Siargao Island, and Bucas Grande Island were upgraded to Signal No. 4, indicating winds of 118 to 184 km/h (73 to 114 mph) after at least 12 hours. At 17:00 PHT (09:00 UTC), Guiuan, the southern portion of Leyte, Southern Leyte, the Camotes Islands, and the northeastern portion of Bohol were raised to Signal No. 4. Three hours later, Signal No. 4 was extended to include Mercedes, the western portion of Leyte, and the northern portion of Cebu. At 23:00 PHT (15:00 UTC), the northernmost portion of Negros Oriental, the northern portion of Negros Occidental, and Guimaras were placed under the signal. Three hours later on November 4, the central and southern portions of Iloilo and the southern portion of Antique were likewise placed under the signal. At 08:00 PHT (00:00 UTC), the entire province of Iloilo and the southern portion of Aklan were added to the signal as well. As Kalmaegi approached Palawan, Signal No. 4 was hoisted in the northern portion of the province as well as the Calamian and Cuyo Islands. At 17:00 PHT (09:00 UTC), all areas previously under Signal No. 4 and No. 3 were lifted. By November 6, only Kalayaan, Palawan remained under alert; PAGASA issued its final bulletin at 17:00 PHT (09:00 UTC) that same day.

The Regional Disaster Risk Reduction and Management Council (RDRRMC) of Eastern Visayas warned citizens to avoid travel to and from the region and suggested the public to view weather bulletins. Officials of Lapu-Lapu City held a meeting to prepare for the storm's impact. The Department of Social Welfare and Development (DSWD) prepared thousands of food packs and placed specialized equipment on standby. All sea travel in Surigao del Norte and nearby routes due to bad conditions. Cebu City was placed in a blue alert, causing all response units in the city to be on standby. Cebu Governor Pam Baricuatro initiated a disaster preparedness and response plan for 11 municipalities and 1 city affected by the 2025 Cebu earthquake. The Department of Education alerted disaster reduction teams throughout the nation due to 25,000 schools having a risk of landslide. The National Capital Region Police Office considered raising a full alert due to the storm. A Cebu Schools Athletic Foundation, Inc. basketball match between the University of the Visayas and the University of Southern Philippines Foundation was postponed. Evacuations were done in Palo and Tanauan, Leyte. The local government in Guiuan resorted to forced evacuations. Dinagat Islands Governor Nilo Demerey Jr. reported that 10,000 to 15,000 people were evacuated in the province. The Office of Civil Defense on November 4 reported that 400,000 people had been evacuated nationwide. Cebu archbishop Alberto Uy ordered all churches in the Archdiocese of Cebu to be used as shelters for displaced residents. Kalmaegi caused 723 cities and municipalities to suspend their classes. Eighty-nine towns suspended classes in Calabarzon, 62 suspended classes in Mimaropa, 72 suspended classes in Bicol (Region 5), 98 suspended classes in Western Visayas (Region 6), 62 suspended classes in the Negros Island Region, 101 suspended classes in Central Visayas (Region 7), 143 suspended classes in Eastern Visayas (Region 8), 24 suspended classes in Northern Mindanao (Region 10), and 72 suspended classes in Caraga. Meanwhile, 484 cities and municipalities suspended work. One town suspended classes in Calabarzon, 60 in Mimaropa, 21 in Region 5, 62 in Region 6, 47 in the Negros Island Region, 101 in Region 7, 123 in Region 8, 10 in Region 10, and 59 in Caraga.

=== Vietnam ===
On the afternoon of November 4, several communes and wards in Gia Lai province began mobilizing and evacuating people in vulnerable areas at high risk of landslides and flooding. Thousands of people in Gia Lai and Quảng Ngãi province evacuated to shelters. Approximately 350,000 people were evacuated in Gia Lai in the lead-up to the storm. A further 7,976 people were evacuated in Dak Lak province. Six airports in central Vietnam suspended operations. Tô Lâm, the general secretary of the Communist Party of Vietnam, cut short a meeting of the party's Central Committee to allow officials to head back to affected regions. More than 260,000 soldiers and personnel, 6,700 vehicles and six aircraft were deployed for relief operations.

=== Elsewhere ===
In China, authorities activated maritime disaster emergency response procedures in Hainan and issued warnings of a "catastrophic wave process" in the South China Sea. The United States National Weather Service, on November 1, alerted the Yap island group in the Federated States of Micronesia to monitor any forecasts and changes due to the Tropical Cyclone Formation Alert; the report said that scattered showers and isolated thunderstorms were possible in the islands for the next couple of days.

== Impact ==
Casualties by country
Country	Deaths	Injuries	Missing	Damage (USD)
Philippines	269	523	113	>$66.2 million
Vietnam	6	26	0	>$515 million
Thailand	13	Unknown	Unknown	Unknown
Total	288	549	113	>$588 million

=== Philippines ===
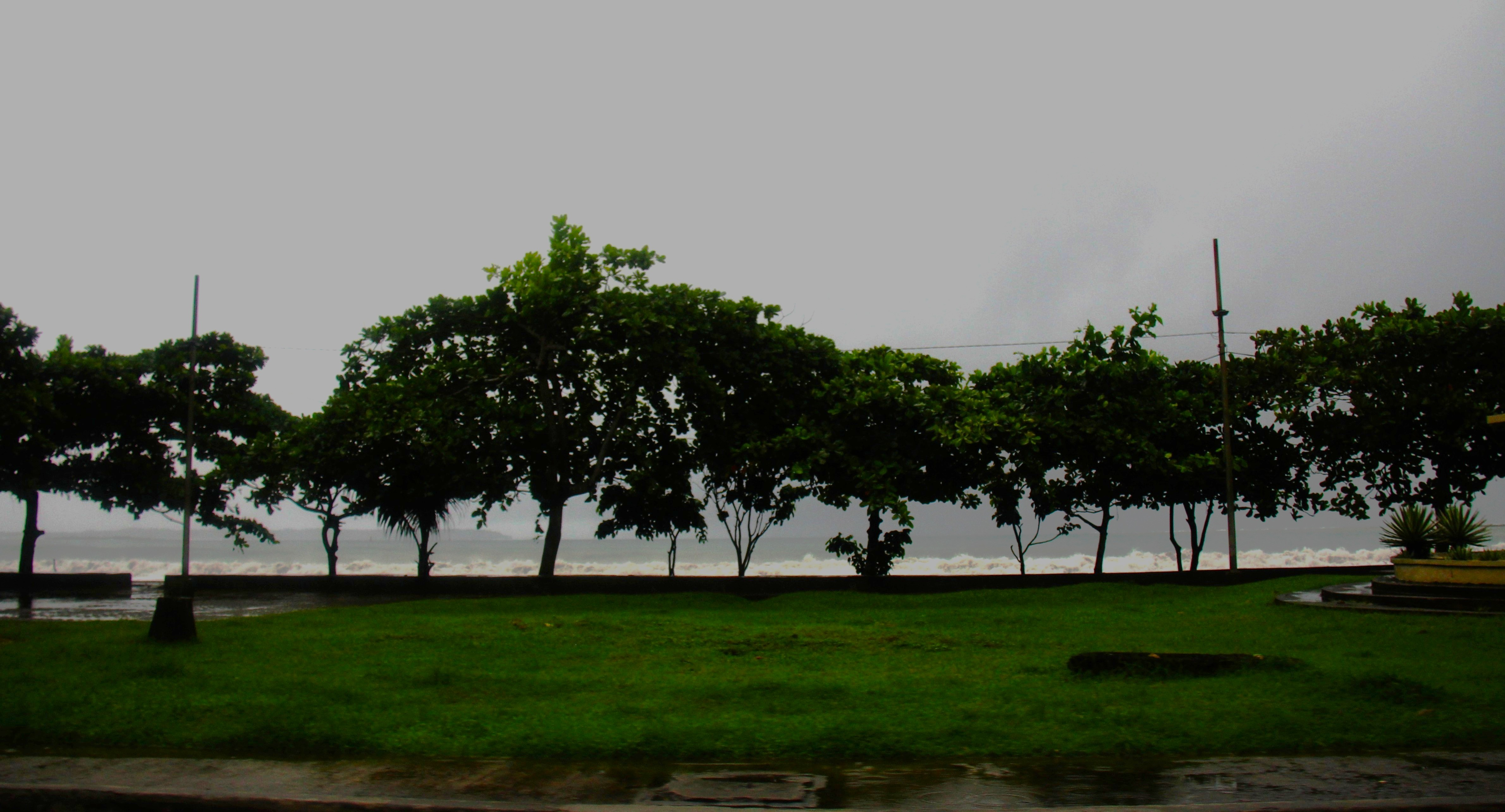
Storm surge affecting Baybay Boulevard in Borongan, Eastern Samar during the onslaught of Kalmaegi (Tino) on November 4

On November 4, the Philippine Coast Guard reported that 4,704 people, 1,649 rolling cargoes and 1,643 maritime vessels were stranded or seeking shelter in 104 ports throughout the country. At least 186 flights were cancelled, affecting at least 16,000 passengers. The National Disaster Risk Reduction and Management Council (NDRRMC) reported that more than 3.5 million individuals were affected by the typhoon, with 643,101 affected in Western Visayas alone. At least 562,037 were displaced. At least 69 roads and eight bridges were rendered impassable, while two airports were closed. Seventy-six schools were damaged, mostly in Eastern Visayas. On November 6, President Bongbong Marcos placed the entire Philippines under a state of calamity. Around 1.4 million households lost electricity. A total of 637,263 homes were damaged, of which 75,681 were destroyed; there were 30,836 destroyed homes in Central Visayas, 28,166 in the Negros Island Region, 10,546 in Eastern Visayas, 4,109 in Mimaropa, 2,433 in Mandaue, 1,294 in Western Visayas, 724 in Caraga, 3 in Northern Mindanao, 2 in Zamboanga Peninsula and 1 in Bicol. At least ₱3.26 billion (US$66.2 million) in agricultural and infrastructure damage was recorded, per the reports of the NDRRMC and the Department of Agriculture.

9 hours after the flood in Danao, Cebu

Kalmaegi generated strong winds and flooding that left at least 269 dead, 523 injured and 113 missing in the Philippines. The major causes of deaths were drowning and being struck by trees. At least 150 deaths occurred in Cebu, including 35 in Liloan, 15 in Compostela, 12 each in Cebu City and Mandaue, eight in Danao and seven in Talisay, with 28 additional deaths occurring elsewhere. Twenty-eight missing people were reported in Cebu City after the Butuanon River swelled and caused flooding. The city's mayor, Nestor Archival, estimated that around 200,000 houses were damaged or inundated. Half of barangay Bacayan was flooded, with many residents saying it was the first such incident in the area in 35 years.

A view of buses being overturned and partially damaged in Mandaue City after Kalmaegi devastated the area.

Floodwaters in Mandaue reached chest levels, causing people to go to evacuation centers. Flooding sometimes reached the second floor of houses; all barangays in the city were affected by the flooding. The Mananga River in Talisay overflowed, wiping out nearby settlements and entire barangays. A state of calamity was declared in Cebu. Its governor, Pam Baricuatro, said Kalmaegi brought the "worst flash flood caused by a typhoon" in the province's history. A state of calamity was also declared in Cebu City, with half of the city reported to be submerged. The inauguration of the Cebu Bus Rapid Transit System was delayed.

In Negros Occidental, at least 77 people were killed, while 63 were reported missing. Twenty-three people were killed in Negros Oriental, while five others went missing. A barangay official also died in Panglao, Bohol due to a falling coconut tree. Two people were killed while another went missing in Southern Leyte, where a province-wide power outage occurred. A state of calamity was declared in Silago, where up to 95% of houses were damaged after the town experienced its first major flooding since 1952. The entire service area of Negros Power in Negros Occidental, including Bacolod, lost electricity, affecting 250,000 customers. The Wright–Taft Road in Taft, Eastern Samar, was impassable. The Visayas State University in Baybay sustained heavy damage. A rain-induced landslide was reported in Antique, burying a motorcycle. A family of four died in Mandaue while a four-month-old infant died in floodwaters. In the island barangays of Guiuan, 30 percent of homes were damaged. The town was also placed under a state of calamity. Uprooted trees and damaged electrical lines were reported in Lapu-Lapu City, but no deaths were recorded. In Iloilo City, 243 houses were damaged, while 23 were destroyed. More than 1,000 houses were damaged in Iloilo Province. In Antique, seven municipalities experienced power outages. Within 24 hours, Kalmaegi generated 235.2 mm (9.26 in) of rain in Maasin, Southern Leyte, and 183 mm (7.2 in) of rain in Lapu-Lapu City, which was greater than the monthly average in those areas. Two people died in separate storm-related incidents in Capiz and Antique. Thousands remained without water in Cebu as of November 12, as officials stated that while water had been restored to 75% of households, many were still without water due to flooding cutting off access to several major facilities.

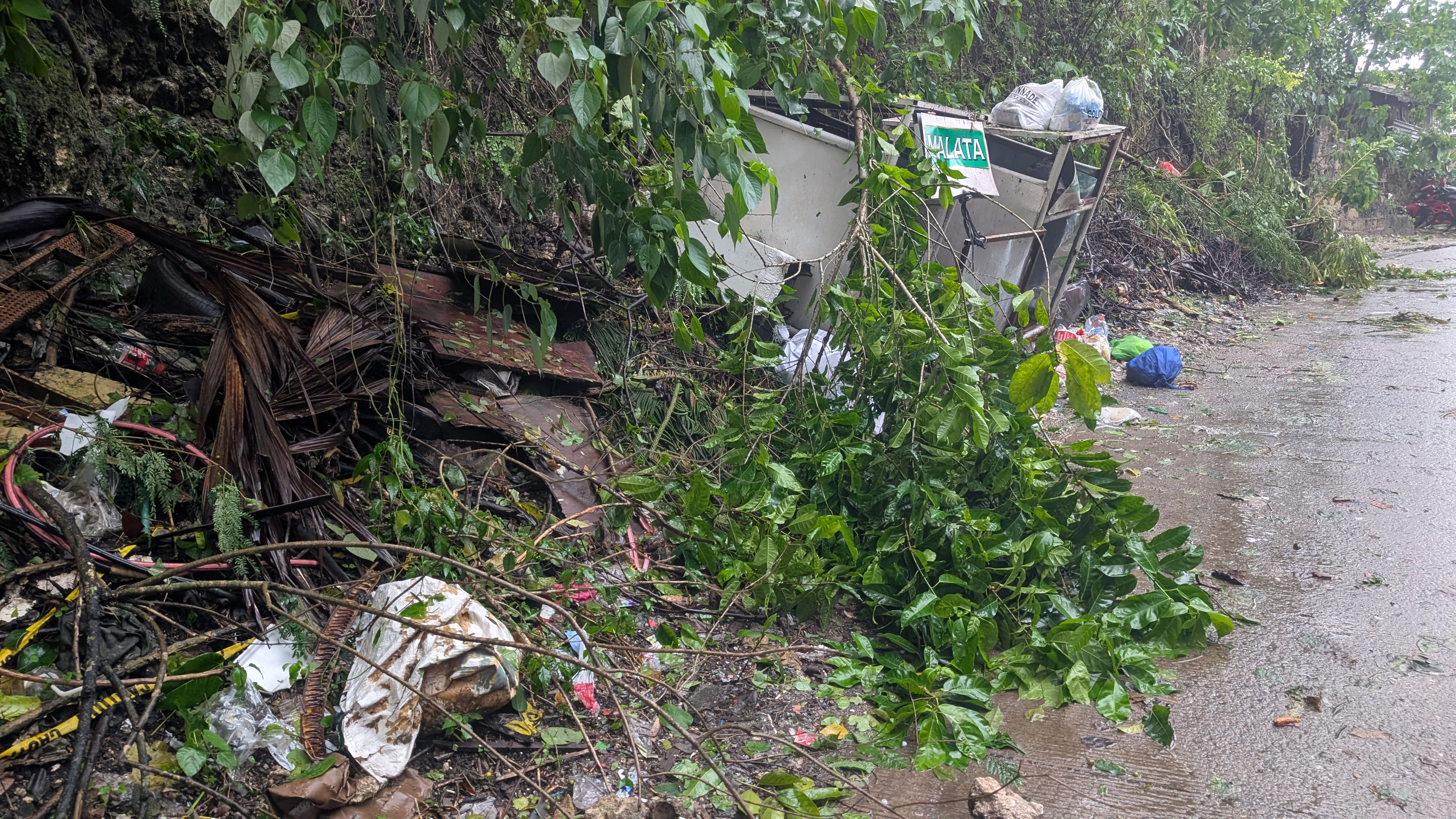
Damage in Cebu City

Parts of Mindanao also experienced significant impacts due to the typhoon. A Super Huey helicopter of the Philippine Air Force crashed on its way to conduct disaster reconnaissance in Loreto, Agusan del Sur, killing six people. Two ships collided with each other in the port of Jolo, Sulu. In Surigao del Norte, two towns also experienced power interruptions. Power outages were reported in Dinagat Islands, where a NAPOCOR power station was damaged in Gibusong Island. In Tubajon, a birthing clinic was damaged, causing ₱13.3 million (US$270,050.76) in losses. The province was placed under a state of calamity. A national high school in Cagdianao was extensively damaged. One person also perished after a boat capsized in Maguindanao del Sur. Meanwhile, Luzon only experienced moderate effects from Kalmaegi; however, a national road in Alaminos, Laguna was reported as passable in only one lane during the storm's onslaught, and a barangay in Mogpog, Marinduque also experienced 1 foot (0.30 metres) floods. Four barangays in Cataingan and one barangay in Cawayan underwent floods as well.

The storm, along with the 2025 Cebu earthquake the previous September, was subsequently attributed by officials as having contributed to the 2026 Binaliw landslide in Cebu City in January by destabilizing the structural integrity of the Binaliw landfill.

=== Vietnam ===
Costliest tropical cyclones in Vietnam
Rank	Storm	Season	Damage		Ref.
Rank	Storm	Season	VND	USD	Ref.
1	Yagi	2024	84.5 trillion	$3.47 billion	
2	Bualoi	2025	23.9 trillion	$950 million	
3	Damrey	2017	22.7 trillion	$1 billion	
4	Matmo	2025	21 trillion	$837 million	
5	Doksuri	2017	18.4 trillion	$809 million	
6	Ketsana	2009	16.1 trillion	$896 million	
7	Wutip	2013	13.6 trillion	$648 million	
8	Molave	2020	13.3 trillion	$573 million	
9	TD 23W	2017	13.1 trillion	$579 million	
10	Kalmaegi	2025	13.1 trillion	$521 million	

Making landfall on November 6, in Dak Lak province, Vietnam, Kalmaegi caused maximum sustained wind speeds of 30 m/s (108 km/h), peak gusts of 40 m/s (144 km/h) at Quy Nhon; and winds 30 m/s (108 km/h), gust 44 m/s (158 km/h) at An Nhon. Kalmaegi killed at least six people in Vietnam; three in Dak Lak province and two in Gia Lai province, and one in Quảng Ngãi. Twenty-six others were injured, while 2,365 houses collapsed and 57,498 houses were damaged. Strong winds and heavy rainfall in the province and in Sông Cầu, Dak Lak province blew off the roofs of dozens of homes, damaged structures and downed trees and electric poles. On Lý Sơn island, Quảng Ngãi province, three people went missing at sea before being rescued three days later.

Damage by Kalmaegi in Vietnam was estimated at 13.097 trillion dong (US$521.4 million), including 10.132 trillion dong (US$403 million) in Gia Lai Province and 2.578 trillion dong (US$102.5 million) in Dak Lak. More than 1.6 million households lost electricity. Sections of the North–South railway were washed away in Dak Lak and Gia Lai. Approximately 333 houses were destroyed: 206 in Gia Lai and 118 in Dak Lak. More than 32,000 houses were damaged as of November 8, some sustaining collapsed roofs, a major increase compared to the 15,000 houses the previous day. Gia Lai had 24,700 damaged houses, while Dak Lak had nearly 6,000 damaged houses. Due to large waves, 96 boats were damaged and sank; more than 18 hectares (44 acres) of fish and shrimp farms, 54,300 aquaculture cages, 3,800 ha (9,400 acres) of rice and crops, 7,400 ha (18,000 acres) of other crops were damaged. Hundreds of vessels, mostly smaller coastal fishing boats, were driven ashore or sunk along the coast. Near Vung Chao, there were at least 200 vessels severely damaged either ashore or sunk. In the port of De Gi, there were reports of at least 10 fishing vessels sunk or run aground. In Quảng Ngãi province, a passenger vessel was driven ashore.

In Hoi An, severe coastal erosion caused by Kalmaegi exposed a shipwreck believed to have originated from between the 14th and 16th centuries.

=== Thailand ===
The remnants of Kalmaegi caused significant flooding in 15 provinces of Thailand, killing 13 people and affecting 470,000 people, 97,000 homes and 3,000 villages, mainly in Central Thailand.

== Response ==
=== Philippines ===
==== Local ====
Due to the flooding in Mandaue, 30 people from the city's Disaster Risk Reduction and Management Office were deployed to rescue residents; the office was placed on red alert. Clearing operations started in the city while the local government assessed the damages. President Bongbong Marcos told government agencies to speed up recovery efforts for areas affected by the typhoon, directing his cabinet members to visit the affected places. The Department of Health declared a code white alert to ensure faster deployment of medical assistance. The provincial government of Cebu redeployed heavy equipment from the north of the province that were used in the 2025 Cebu earthquake to areas affected by the storm and declared a state of calamity due to widespread destruction. Rescue operations were suspended on November 8 due to risks posed by another incoming typhoon, Fung-wong (Uwan).

The Department of Environment and Natural Resources formed a team to investigate The Rise at Monterrazas, an upscale mountainside condominium project in Cebu City, amid accusations by residents that the site's layout helped exacerbate flooding in parts of the city. Furthermore, President Marcos announced on November 13 that Philippine politicians involved in any corruption involving flood-control projects would be in jail by Christmas. Just days later, tens of thousands gathered in Manila starting on November 16 to protest governmental corruption, with an emphasis on corruption related to flood-control projects. A complaint was filed before the Office of the Ombudsman against Cebu 5th district congressman Duke Frasco and the mayors of Liloan, Catmon, San Francisco, Tudela, Poro, Pilar, and Compostela, for travelling outside the Philippines during Kalmaegi's onslaught.

==== International ====
Numerous foreign states offered aid and condolences to the Philippines. Timor-Leste vowed to send 120 local engineers and firefighters to assist in clearing operations and rehabilitation efforts of the most devastated areas. The United States committed to provide $1 million in "immediate life-saving assistance", as well as to deliver emergency services to the hardest-hit communities, including emergency shelter, logistics, and access to safe water and sanitation. This aid was intended to assist not only the victims of Typhoon Kalmaegi but also those affected by other storms and the 2025 Cebu earthquake. In addition, Canada, Australia, and Japan expressed their sympathies and assured the Philippines of their readiness to provide further assistance to support the country and its citizens in their recovery. China pledged more than $2.4 million in humanitarian aid to be used in recovery efforts following Kalmaegi and Typhoon Fung-wong (Uwan), while Australia pledged $3 million in aid for both storms.

The World Bank released a US$500 million support package to assist recovery and reconstruction efforts nationwide. The funds are designated for rehabilitating damaged infrastructure and restoring affected communities.

== Retirement ==
Due to the extensive damage and high death toll in the Philippines and Vietnam, the ESCAP/WMO Typhoon Committee retired the name Kalmaegi, along with seven others, from the rotating storm name lists during its 58th Session. Its replacement name will be announced in 2027.

On March 19, 2026, PAGASA retired the name Tino from its rotating naming lists due to the extensive damages and loss of life it caused, and will never be used again as a typhoon name within the PAR. It will be replaced with Tala, the Filipino word for "star", for the 2029 season.

== See also ==
- Weather of 2025
- Tropical cyclones in 2025
- List of Philippine typhoons
- Tropical cyclones in Vietnam
