= Cebu's 1st congressional district =

Legislative district of the Philippines

- Constituency for the House of Representatives of the Philippines
- Boundary of Cebu's 1st congressional district in Cebu

- Location of Cebu within the Philippines
- Province: Cebu
- Region: Central Visayas
- Population: 809,335 (2020)
- Electorate: 470,692 (2022)
- Major settlements: 6 LGUs: Cities; Carcar; Naga; Talisay; Municipalities; Minglanilla; San Fernando; Sibonga
- Area: 527.06 km^{2} (203.50 sq mi)

Current constituency
- Created: 1907
- Representative: Rhea Gullas
- Political party: NUP; 1CEBU
- Congressional bloc: Majority

Cebu's 1st congressional district is one of the seven congressional districts of the Philippines in the province of Cebu. It has been represented in the House of Representatives of the Philippines since 1916 and earlier in the Philippine Assembly from 1907 to 1916. The district consists of the cities of Carcar, Naga and Talisay and the municipalities of Minglanilla, San Fernando and Sibonga. It is currently represented in the 20th Congress by Rhea Gullas of the National Unity Party (NUP) and One Cebu (1CEBU).

Prior to its second dissolution in 1972, the district encompassed the northeastern municipalities of Bogo, Borbon, Carmen, Catmon, Pilar, Poro, San Francisco, Sogod, Tabogon, and Tudela, and the city of Danao.

== Representation history ==
#	Image	Member	Term of office		Legislature	Party	Electoral history	Constituent LGUs
#	Image	Member	Start	End	Legislature	Party	Electoral history	Constituent LGUs
=== Cebu's 1st district for the Philippine Assembly ===
District created January 9, 1907.
1		Celestino Rodriguez	October 16, 1907	October 16, 1912	1st	Nacionalista	Elected in 1907.	1907–1909; Bogo, Borbon, Carmen, Catmon, Danao, Pilar, San Francisco, Tabogon, Tudela
1		Celestino Rodriguez	October 16, 1907	October 16, 1912	2nd	Nacionalista	Re-elected in 1909.	1909–1916; Bogo, Borbon, Carmen, Catmon, Danao, Pilar, Poro, San Francisco, Tabogon, Tudela
2		Gervasio Padilla	October 16, 1912	October 16, 1916	3rd	Nacionalista	Elected in 1912.	1909–1916; Bogo, Borbon, Carmen, Catmon, Danao, Pilar, Poro, San Francisco, Tabogon, Tudela
=== Cebu's 1st district for the House of Representatives of the Philippine Islands ===
3		José Hernaez	October 16, 1916	June 3, 1919	4th	Nacionalista	Elected in 1916.	1916–1922; Bogo, Borbon, Carmen, Catmon, Danao, Pilar, Poro, San Francisco, Tabogon, Tudela
4		Manuel Briones	June 3, 1919	June 2, 1931	5th	Nacionalista	Elected in 1919.	1916–1922; Bogo, Borbon, Carmen, Catmon, Danao, Pilar, Poro, San Francisco, Tabogon, Tudela
4		Manuel Briones	June 3, 1919	June 2, 1931	6th	Nacionalista; Unipersonalista	Re-elected in 1922.	1922–1935; Bogo, Borbon, Carmen, Catmon, Danao, Pilar, Poro, San Francisco, Sogod, Tabogon, Tudela
4		Manuel Briones	June 3, 1919	June 2, 1931	7th	Nacionalista; Consolidado	Re-elected in 1925.	1922–1935; Bogo, Borbon, Carmen, Catmon, Danao, Pilar, Poro, San Francisco, Sogod, Tabogon, Tudela
4		Manuel Briones	June 3, 1919	June 2, 1931	8th	Nacionalista; Consolidado	Re-elected in 1928.	1922–1935; Bogo, Borbon, Carmen, Catmon, Danao, Pilar, Poro, San Francisco, Sogod, Tabogon, Tudela
5		Buenaventura Rodriguez	June 2, 1931	June 5, 1934	9th	Nacionalista; Consolidado	Elected in 1931.	1922–1935; Bogo, Borbon, Carmen, Catmon, Danao, Pilar, Poro, San Francisco, Sogod, Tabogon, Tudela
6		Tereso Dosdos	June 5, 1934	September 16, 1935	10th	Nacionalista; Democrático	Elected in 1934.	1922–1935; Bogo, Borbon, Carmen, Catmon, Danao, Pilar, Poro, San Francisco, Sogod, Tabogon, Tudela
#	Image	Member	Term of office		National Assembly	Party	Electoral history	Constituent LGUs
#	Image	Member	Start	End	National Assembly	Party	Electoral history	Constituent LGUs
=== Cebu's 1st district for the National Assembly (Commonwealth of the Philippines) ===
(1)		Celestino Rodriguez	September 16, 1935	December 30, 1938	1st	Nacionalista; Demócrata Pro-Independencia	Elected in 1935.	1935–1941; Bogo, Borbon, Carmen, Catmon, Danao, Pilar, Poro, San Francisco, Sogod, Tabogon, Tudela
(6)		Tereso Dosdos	December 30, 1938	December 30, 1941	2nd	Nacionalista	Elected in 1938.	1935–1941; Bogo, Borbon, Carmen, Catmon, Danao, Pilar, Poro, San Francisco, Sogod, Tabogon, Tudela
District dissolved into the two-seat Cebu's at-large district for the National Assembly (Second Philippine Republic).
#	Image	Member	Term of office		Common wealth Congress	Party	Electoral history	Constituent LGUs
#	Image	Member	Start	End	Common wealth Congress	Party	Electoral history	Constituent LGUs
=== Cebu's 1st district for the House of Representatives of the Commonwealth of the Philippines ===
District re-created May 24, 1945.
(1)		Celestino Rodriguez	June 9, 1945	May 25, 1946	1st	Nacionalista	Elected in 1941.	1945–1946; Bogo, Borbon, Carmen, Catmon, Danao, Pilar, Poro, San Francisco, Sogod, Tabogon, Tudela
#	Image	Member	Term of office		Congress	Party	Electoral history	Constituent LGUs
#	Image	Member	Start	End	Congress	Party	Electoral history	Constituent LGUs
=== Cebu's 1st district for the House of Representatives of the Philippines ===
7		Jovenal Almendras	May 25, 1946	December 30, 1949	1st	Nacionalista	Elected in 1946.	1946–1972; Bogo, Borbon, Carmen, Catmon, Danao, Pilar, Poro, San Francisco, Sogod, Tabogon, Tudela
8		Ramón M. Durano	December 30, 1949	September 23, 1972	2nd	Liberal	Elected in 1949.	1946–1972; Bogo, Borbon, Carmen, Catmon, Danao, Pilar, Poro, San Francisco, Sogod, Tabogon, Tudela
8		Ramón M. Durano	December 30, 1949	September 23, 1972	3rd	Democratic	Re-elected in 1953.	1946–1972; Bogo, Borbon, Carmen, Catmon, Danao, Pilar, Poro, San Francisco, Sogod, Tabogon, Tudela
8		Ramón M. Durano	December 30, 1949	September 23, 1972	4th	Nacionalista	Re-elected in 1957.	1946–1972; Bogo, Borbon, Carmen, Catmon, Danao, Pilar, Poro, San Francisco, Sogod, Tabogon, Tudela
8		Ramón M. Durano	December 30, 1949	September 23, 1972	5th	Nacionalista	Re-elected in 1961.	1946–1972; Bogo, Borbon, Carmen, Catmon, Danao, Pilar, Poro, San Francisco, Sogod, Tabogon, Tudela
8		Ramón M. Durano	December 30, 1949	September 23, 1972	6th	Nacionalista	Re-elected in 1965.	1946–1972; Bogo, Borbon, Carmen, Catmon, Danao, Pilar, Poro, San Francisco, Sogod, Tabogon, Tudela
8		Ramón M. Durano	December 30, 1949	September 23, 1972	7th	Nacionalista	Re-elected in 1969. Removed from office after imposition of martial law.	1946–1972; Bogo, Borbon, Carmen, Catmon, Danao, Pilar, Poro, San Francisco, Sogod, Tabogon, Tudela
District dissolved into the thirteen-seat Region VII's at-large district for the Interim Batasang Pambansa, followed by the six-seat Cebu's at-large district for the Regular Batasang Pambansa.
District re-created February 2, 1987.
9		Antonio T. Bacaltos	June 30, 1987	June 30, 1992	8th	LABAN (Panaghiusa)	Elected in 1987.	1987–present Carcar, Minglanilla, Naga, San Fernando, Sibonga, Talisay
10		Eduardo R. Gullas	June 30, 1992	June 30, 2001	9th	NPC (Alayon)	Elected in 1992.	1987–present Carcar, Minglanilla, Naga, San Fernando, Sibonga, Talisay
10		Eduardo R. Gullas	June 30, 1992	June 30, 2001	10th	Lakas (Alayon)	Re-elected in 1995.	1987–present Carcar, Minglanilla, Naga, San Fernando, Sibonga, Talisay
10		Eduardo R. Gullas	June 30, 1992	June 30, 2001	11th	PROMDI (Alayon)	Re-elected in 1998.	1987–present Carcar, Minglanilla, Naga, San Fernando, Sibonga, Talisay
11		Jose R. Gullas	June 30, 2001	June 30, 2004	12th	NPC (Alayon)	Elected in 2001.	1987–present Carcar, Minglanilla, Naga, San Fernando, Sibonga, Talisay
(10)		Eduardo R. Gullas	June 30, 2004	June 30, 2013	13th	Nacionalista (Alayon)	Elected in 2004.	1987–present Carcar, Minglanilla, Naga, San Fernando, Sibonga, Talisay
(10)		Eduardo R. Gullas	June 30, 2004	June 30, 2013	14th	Nacionalista (Alayon)	Re-elected in 2007.	1987–present Carcar, Minglanilla, Naga, San Fernando, Sibonga, Talisay
(10)		Eduardo R. Gullas	June 30, 2004	June 30, 2013	15th	Nacionalista (Alayon)	Re-elected in 2010.	1987–present Carcar, Minglanilla, Naga, San Fernando, Sibonga, Talisay
12		Gerald Anthony V. Gullas Jr.	June 30, 2013	June 30, 2019	16th	Nacionalista (Alayon)	Elected in 2013.	1987–present Carcar, Minglanilla, Naga, San Fernando, Sibonga, Talisay
12		Gerald Anthony V. Gullas Jr.	June 30, 2013	June 30, 2019	17th	Nacionalista (Alayon)	Re-elected in 2016.	1987–present Carcar, Minglanilla, Naga, San Fernando, Sibonga, Talisay
(10)		Eduardo R. Gullas	June 30, 2019	June 30, 2022	18th	Nacionalista (Alayon) (1CEBU)	Elected in 2019.	1987–present Carcar, Minglanilla, Naga, San Fernando, Sibonga, Talisay
13		Rhea Mae A. Gullas	June 30, 2022	Incumbent	19th	Nacionalista (Alayon) (1CEBU)	Elected in 2022.	1987–present Carcar, Minglanilla, Naga, San Fernando, Sibonga, Talisay
13		Rhea Mae A. Gullas	June 30, 2022	Incumbent	20th	Lakas (Alayon) (1CEBU)	Re-elected in 2025.	1987–present Carcar, Minglanilla, Naga, San Fernando, Sibonga, Talisay
13		Rhea Mae A. Gullas	June 30, 2022	Incumbent	20th	NUP (Alayon) (1CEBU)	Re-elected in 2025.	1987–present Carcar, Minglanilla, Naga, San Fernando, Sibonga, Talisay

== Election results ==
=== 2025 ===
2025 Philippine House of Representatives elections
Party	Candidate	Votes	%
Lakas	Rhea Gullas	282,814	100.00
Total votes		282,814	100.00
Lakas hold			

=== 2022 ===
2022 Philippine House of Representatives elections
Party	Candidate	Votes	%
Nacionalista	Rhea Gullas	288,131	100.00
Total votes		291,366	100.00
Nacionalista hold			

=== 2019 ===
2019 Philippine House of Representatives elections
Party	Candidate	Votes	%
Nacionalista	Eduardo Gullas	236,944	81.32
Independent	Ron Del Mar	48,131	16.51
Independent	Solomon Paypa	6,291	2.15
Total votes		291,366	100.00
Nacionalista hold			

=== 2016 ===
2016 Philippine House of Representatives elections
Party	Candidate	Votes	%
Nacionalista	Gerald Anthony Gullas Jr.	186,091	65.23
NPC	Antonio Canoy	92,589	32.45
PDP–Laban	Michael Nuñez	6,612	2.32
Valid ballots		285,292	88.42
Invalid or blank votes		37,380	11.58
Total votes		322,672	100.00
Nacionalista hold			

=== 2013 ===
2013 Philippine House of Representatives elections
Party	Candidate	Votes	%
Nacionalista	Gerald Anthony Gullas Jr.	153,514	63.88
Invalid or blank votes		86,792	36.12
Total votes		240,306	100.00
Nacionalista hold			

=== 2010 ===
2010 Philippine House of Representatives elections
Party	Candidate	Votes	%
Nacionalista	Eduardo Gullas	209,208	92.91
PMP	Luna Sabalones	10,527	4.67
Independent	Felipe Concepcion	5,449	2.42
Valid ballots		225,184	86.54
Invalid or blank votes		35,039	13.46
Total votes		260,223	100.00
Nacionalista hold			

== See also ==
- Legislative districts of Cebu
