= Camotes Islands =

Group of islands in the Philippines

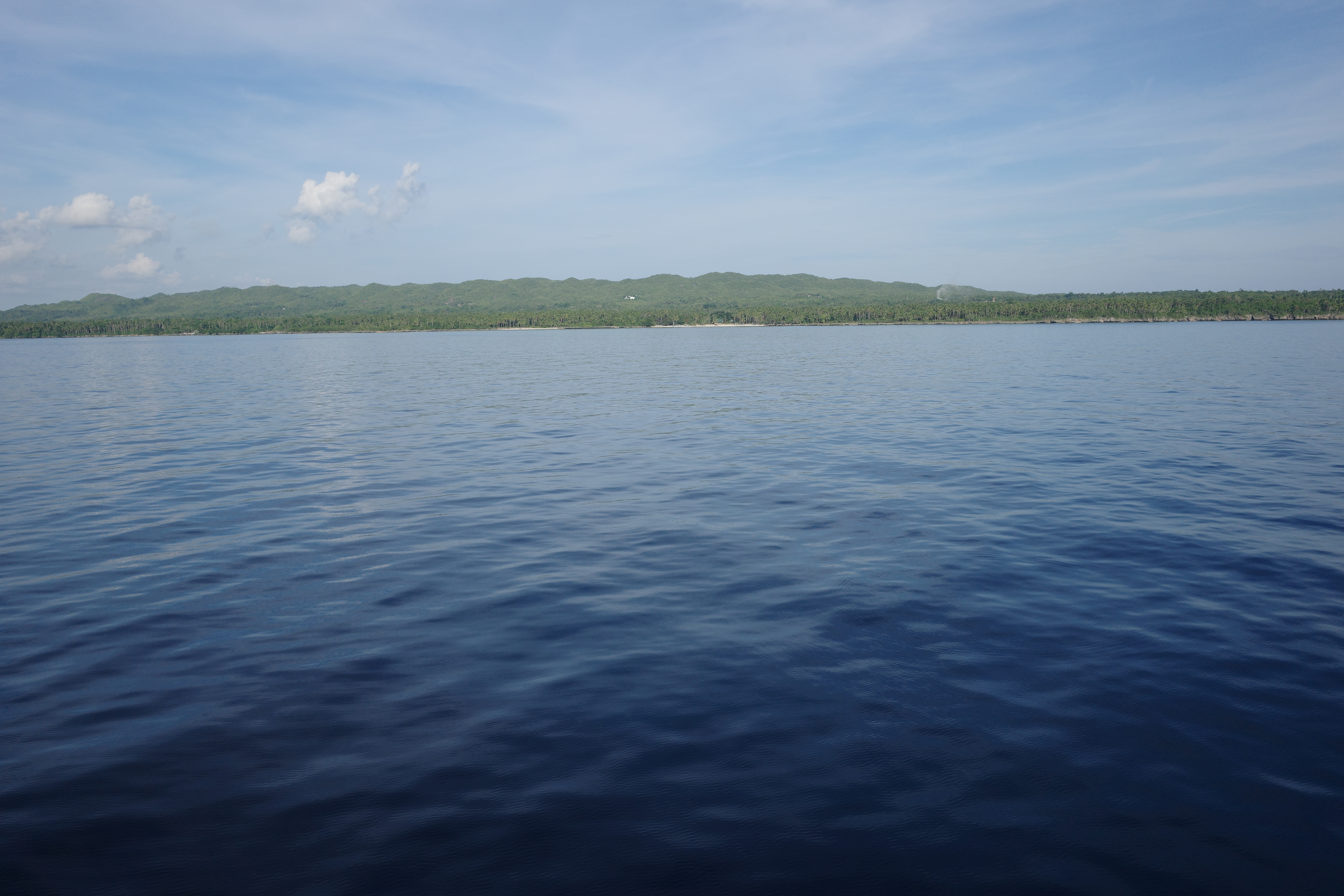
- A view of Pacijan Island from the sea

- Location within the Philippines

Geography
- Location: Camotes Sea
- Coordinates: 10°40′N 124°24′E
- Archipelago: Camotes Islands
- Total islands: 4 (habitable)
- Major islands: Pacijan; Ponson; Poro
- Area: 236.36 km^{2} (91.26 sq mi)
- Highest elevation: 388 m (1273 ft)
- Highest point: Mount Altavista

Administration
- Philippines
- Region: Central Visayas (Region VII)
- Province: Cebu

Demographics
- Population: 109,278 (2020)
- Pop. density: 462/km^{2} (1197/sq mi)

The Camotes Islands are a group of islands in the Camotes Sea, Philippines. Its combined area is 236.36 km^{2} (91.26 sq mi). The island group is located east of Cebu Island, southwest of Leyte Island, and north of Bohol Island. It is 34 nmi (63 km; 39 mi) from Cebu City and is part of the Province of Cebu. According to the 2020 census, it has a population of 109,278. Population has grown 42.5% since 1990, equivalent to an annual growth rate of 1.19%.

Nearest landfall, from the north end of Ponson Island to southern Leyte, is about 7.2 km (4.5 mi; 3.9 nmi). From Consuelo port to Danao is 32 km (20 mi; 17 nmi) as the crow flies. From south of Pacijan to Bohol is about 47 km (29 mi; 25 nmi).

Sometimes known as the "Lost Horizon of the south", (Note: Presumably a bad-geography allusion to Lost Horizon, the 1933 novel by James Hilton, whose principal location was a land where people never aged – Shangri-La.) the Camotes has seen increased visitors and tourism and a growing expatriate community. Among the natural attractions are dive sites around the islands.

== Geography ==
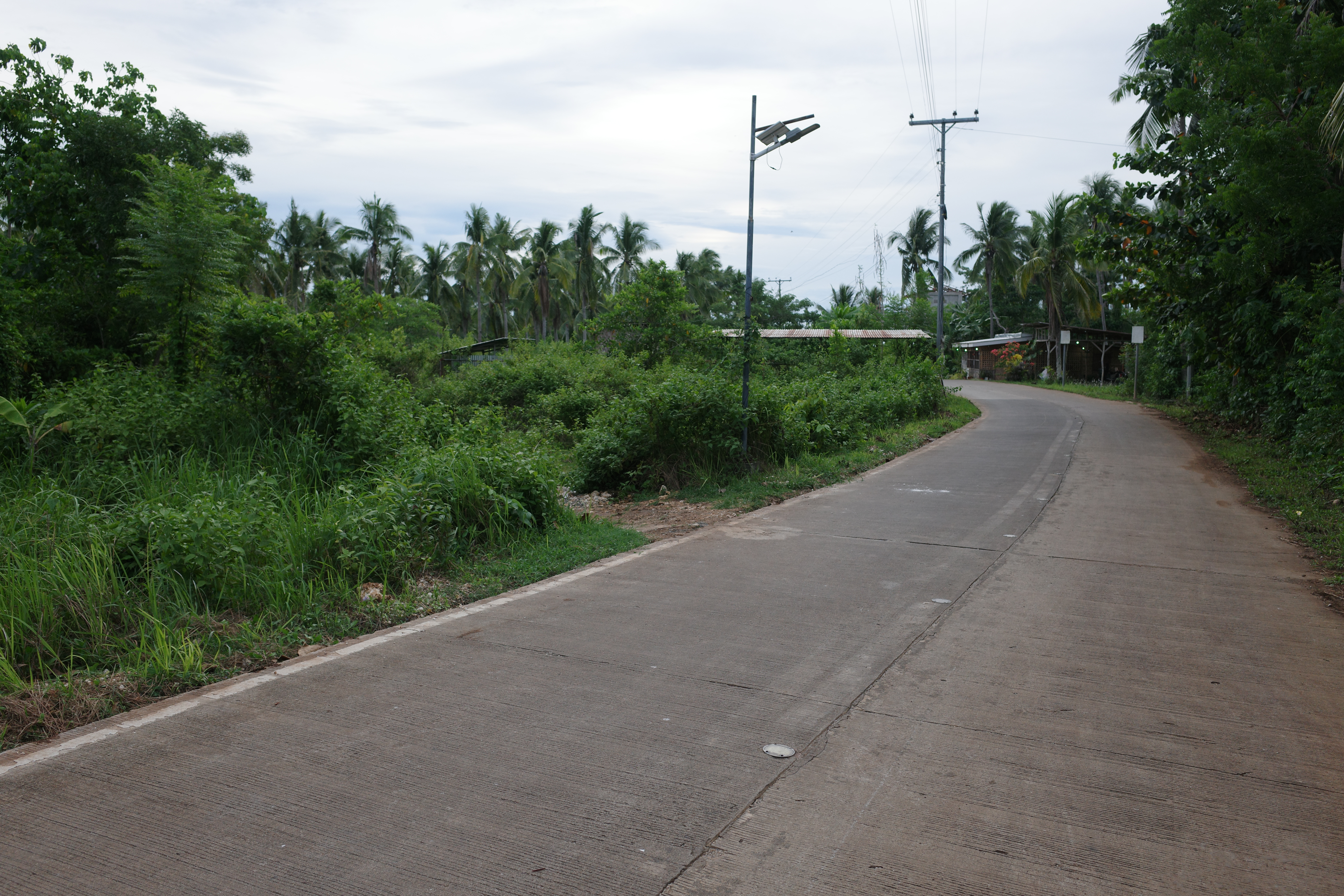
A rural road on Pacijan Island

Camotes Islands comprises three major islands and one minor islet, divided between four municipalities. On Poro Island are the municipalities of Poro and Tudela. Pacijan Island's sole municipality is San Francisco, which also governs the offshore islet of Tulang. Ponson Island's sole municipality is Pilar. The main islands of Pacijan and Poro are connected by a 1.5 km (0.93 mi) causeway. Ponson lies about 4 km (2.5 mi) northeast of Poro, across the Kawit Strait, while Tulang is located a short distance north of Pacijan.

The Camotes are low-lying with several hills, some used for telecommunications relay stations. The highest point is Altavista, 388 m (1,273 ft) above sea level, on Poro. Pacijan has a large lake, Lake Danao, which at 650 ha (1,600 acres) is the largest freshwater lake in the province.

=== Climate ===
The islands have a tropical monsoon climate (Köppen climate classification category "Am"), with rainfall more or less evenly distributed throughout the year – Coronas climate type IV.

=== Flora ===
By Presidential Proclamation 2152 of 1981, the islands of Ponson, Poro and Pacijan are protected mangrove swamp forest reserves. Exemplars of the rare, critically endangered Cebu Cinnamon (Cinnamomum cebuense) or kaningag tree have also been discovered on the Camotes Islands. Palm trees are the dominant plant on the islands, as are native varieties of fruit-bearing plants including banana, mango, and pineapple.

== Language ==
Cebuano is the primary language, then English and Filipino. Schoolchildren are taught all three languages. Porohanon or Camotes Visayan is spoken chiefly in the town of Poro, and is one of the most endangered languages in the Visayas. The language is classified as distinct from Cebuano (Bisaya) by the Komisyon ng Wikang Filipino, and is essential to the culture and arts of the local Porohanon people. Porohanon is mutually intelligible with other varieties of Bisaya spoken elsewhere in the Camotes Islands and Cebu, the Visayas, and northern Mindanao. The language is noted for substituting the /z/ sound for /j/ ⟨y⟩. Example: Maayong buntag (Cebuano, "Good morning") is Maazong buntag in Porohanon. There are also distinctions in function words, such as the existential: Na-a diha (Cebuano, "It is there") is Ara dira (Porohanon).

== History ==
Little is known of the islands' early history. The twentieth century saw a number of archaeological studies, but nothing of major significance emerged.

An early visitor was Carl Guthe, who led an expedition from the University of Michigan which spent three years (1923–1925) investigating and exploring many sites across the archipelago. He conducted an archaeological dig at a cave on Tulang on the southeastern coast of the island, with the cave measuring about 3.7 by 2.7 m (12.1 by 8.9 ft). Guthe reported it to contain bone fragments and teeth of about 60 individuals. Associated grave goods included earthenware pottery, shell bracelets, bronze and iron artefacts (iron tang, bronze chisel, iron blade), glass and stone beads, hammerstone and pestle. Filed teeth were also recovered from this site. (Note: Carl Guthe explored 485 sites comprising 120 caves, 134 burial grounds and 231 graves all over the Philippines, contained in an inventory report now deposited at the University of Michigan.) Otley Beyer, dubbed the Philippines' "Father of Anthropology", never visited, although he is reported to have described Camotes as a "basket of interesting archaeological finds."

In the early 1970s, residents unearthed a variety of artefacts dating back to the 16th century. An excavation at Mactang, a purok of Barangay Esperanza, Poro, revealed spears, daggers, swords, crosses, iron pendants and a skull pierced with an arrowhead. This heavily disturbed and looted site along the shoreline of Mactang was excavated in the 1990s by Bailen and Cabanilla of the University of the Philippines Diliman and explored by Bersales and the University of San Carlos in 2001. Porcelain and earthenware sherds are strewn on the surface of what would otherwise have been a 13th- or 14th-century CE burial site.

In one barangay, Bailen and Cabanilla found a complex of caves which they believed had been inhabited by primitive people. Cabanilla asked municipal officials to preserve the site while their project proposal was approved, planning to conduct a dig and leave whatever artefacts were found in the caves, transforming the place into an onsite museum. A few months later, having secured project funding from a foreign institution, Cabanilla returned to find the caves already mined of stone and sold to a sinter plant in Leyte by the mayor, despite earlier assurances of its safekeeping. Only one cave remained, and the town's plan to erect a museum was abandoned.

=== European contact ===
The islands were first mentioned by Antonio Pigafetta, one of the survivors from Ferdinand Magellan's expedition, as they waited off the islands for several days before going on to Cebu in the first week of April 1521: (Note: This manuscript volume, dating from around 1525, details Magellan's voyage around the world in 1519–22. The work is attributed to Antonio Pigafetta, who accompanied Magellan on the voyage and was one of only 18 of the roughly 240 men who returned to Spain.)

De mazaua agatighan sonno vinti leghe partendone de gatighan al ponente il re de mazaua no ne puote seguir por che lo espectassemo circa tres ysolle cioe polo ticobon et pozon. [There is a distance of twenty leguas (Note: The league (legua) was not well defined, but was about 4 nmi (4.6 mi; 7.4 km) ± 5%.) from Mazaua to Gatighan. We set out westward from Gatighan, but the king could not follow us closely and consequently we awaited him near three islands, namely Polo, Ticobon and Pozon.]

Writing in 1582, Miguel de Loarca stated:

East of the island of Çubu are two small islets, each about five leagues in circumference. They are called the islets of Camotes. The two are inhabited by about three hundred Indians, and are under the jurisdiction of the city of Çubu. The people are poor, although they possess some wax and a great quantity of fish. The villages are small, consisting of only seven or eight houses each.

He also wrote that the natives possessed "fowls, swine, a few goats, beans, and a kind of root resembling the potatoes of Sancto Domingo, called by the natives camotes." This remark is itself notable in that "camote" is the Hispanicized form of the Nahuatl word for "sweet potato", indicating a prior visit by a Spanish ship from Mexico.

=== Administrative history and World War II ===
Administratively, the Camotes Islands were previously part of Leyte Province before being transferred to Cebu during the American period. In 1942, Imperial Japanese forces invaded the Camotes Islands as part of their occupation of the Philippines in World War II. In 1945, Japanese soldiers massacred almost all the inhabitants of Pilar, which was counted among the war crimes in a later trial. Liberation of the islands happened soon after the massacre, when combined Philippine and American soldiers landed and fought the remaining Japanese troops in the Battle of Camotes Islands.

== Economy ==
The predominant industries on the Camotes Islands are farming (including corn, rice, pigs, chicken and cattle), fishing and tourism. Major employers are CELCO (Camotes Electric Cooperative) and Kinoshita Pearl Farm. There is a small hospital, while Fiesta Mall – the first mall on the island – opened in 2015. (Note: An unconfirmed report gives a mall opening date of October 2014.)

== Tourism ==
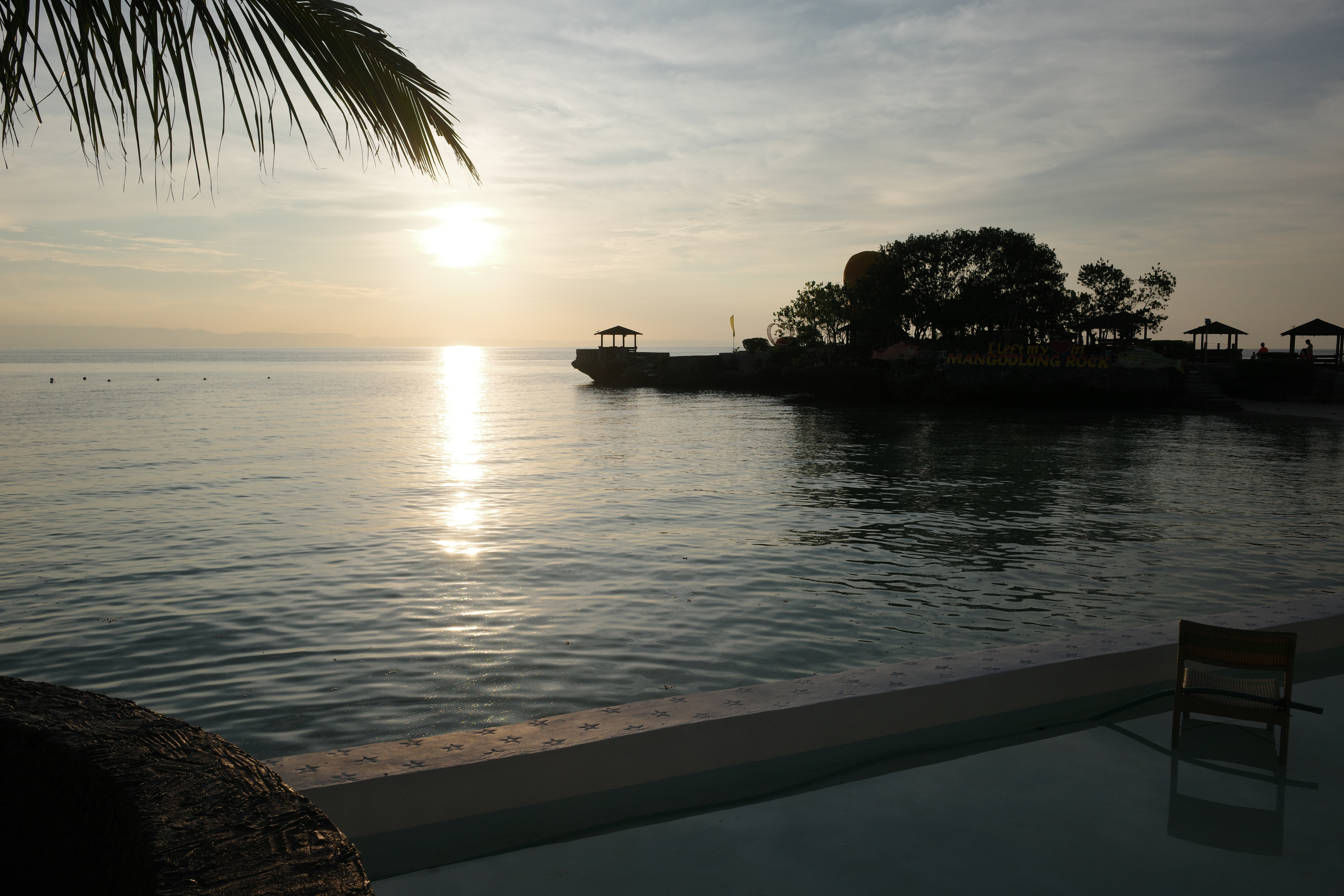
Sunset on Mangodlong Beach

There are about 22 tourist resorts catering to both domestic and international visitors, with many public and private beaches. Diving and snorkeling are available at some of the resorts. Tourism is a key focus of economic development for the island, centred on its white-sand beaches and clean environment.

Tourist spots in the island group include Buho Rock, Greenlake Park, Mount Calvary (Kalbaryo), Lake Danao and the vast mangrove swamp along the road from Pacijan (San Francisco) to Poro. There are many caves such as Bukilat Cave, Timubo Cave and Guadalupe Cave, which has a freshwater underground lake. Poro has two waterfalls, one in Poro and one in Tudela.

== Infrastructure ==
=== Electricity ===
The Camotes Islands are not connected to the main Visayas grid and rely on off-grid generation, with electricity distributed by the Camotes Electric Cooperative (CELCO). For years the islands were supplied by diesel generator sets provided by the National Power Corporation Small Power Utilities Group; the ageing single-phase distribution system and reliance on shipped-in fuel resulted in frequent and prolonged brownouts. Since 2021, power has been generated by the Camotes Island Power Generation Corporation (CAMPCOR), an independent power producer supplying about 8.41 MW (11,280 hp) from diesel plants under a power-supply agreement with CELCO. Power interruptions have continued to be reported, and in 2025 the Department of Energy conducted an on-site assessment of the island's supply and began exploring hybrid renewable and battery-storage options to improve reliability.

=== Telecommunications ===
PLDT landed a submarine fibre-optic cable on Camotes in June 2022, connecting the islands to Mandaue and Ormoc and extending fixed fibre broadband to the group. According to the company, the link also supports LTE and 5G mobile service through its subsidiary Smart Communications. Mobile coverage has nonetheless been criticised as unreliable. In August 2020, town mayors and resort operators complained of poor internet service and weak signal as tourism reopened, prompting Smart and Globe to meet the provincial government and pledge cell-site upgrades; the Cebu governor asked the carriers to prioritise resorts and tourism sites. In 2022, the provincial government also courted the third telecommunications carrier, DITO, to expand coverage and competition on the islands.

=== Transport and access ===
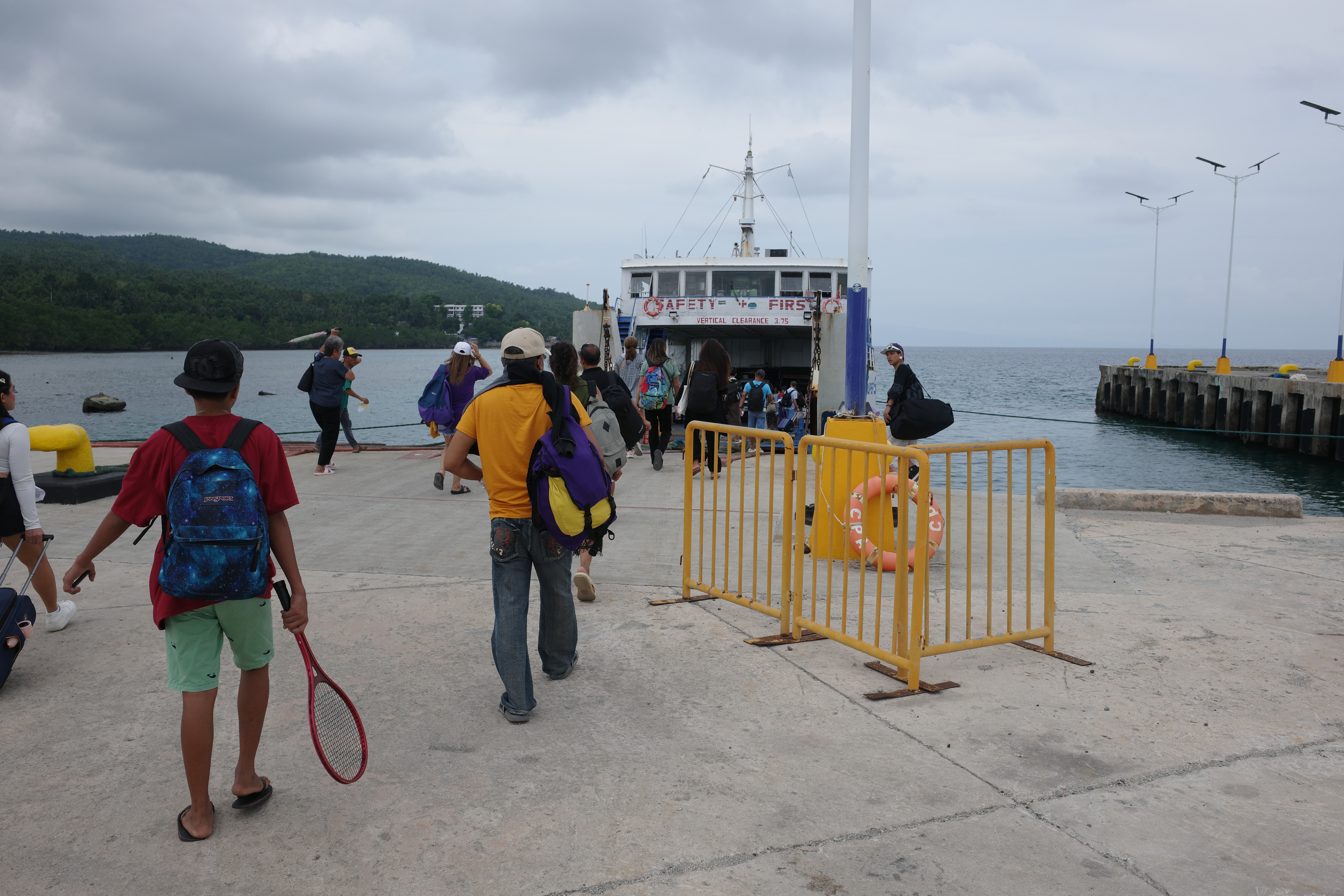
Leaving the Camotes Islands by boarding a ferry at Poro Port

The Camotes Islands have no operating commercial airport and are reached by sea. Roll-on/roll-off ferries and fast craft link the islands to mainland Cebu, chiefly between Danao and Consuelo Port and between Liloan and Poro Port, with additional services to Ormoc on Leyte. During rough seas and typhoons, the Philippine Coast Guard and Cebu Port Authority routinely suspend these sailings, at times stranding passengers.

There is a small rolled-earth airstrip on Pacijan Island, approximately 1,450 m (4,760 ft) long, with a general north–south alignment. It has not been classified by the Civil Aviation Authority of the Philippines and has no airport code. After a visit by President Benigno Aquino III in February 2014, the government began exploring development of the airport as a prerequisite to expand tourism. In February 2015, it was reported that initial work was underway on building new airports at Bantayan Island and Camotes.

Within the islands, local transport consists mainly of motorcycle taxis (habal-habal), motorized tricycles and multicabs, with a few jeepneys running between the towns; app-based ride-hailing and metered taxis are not available.

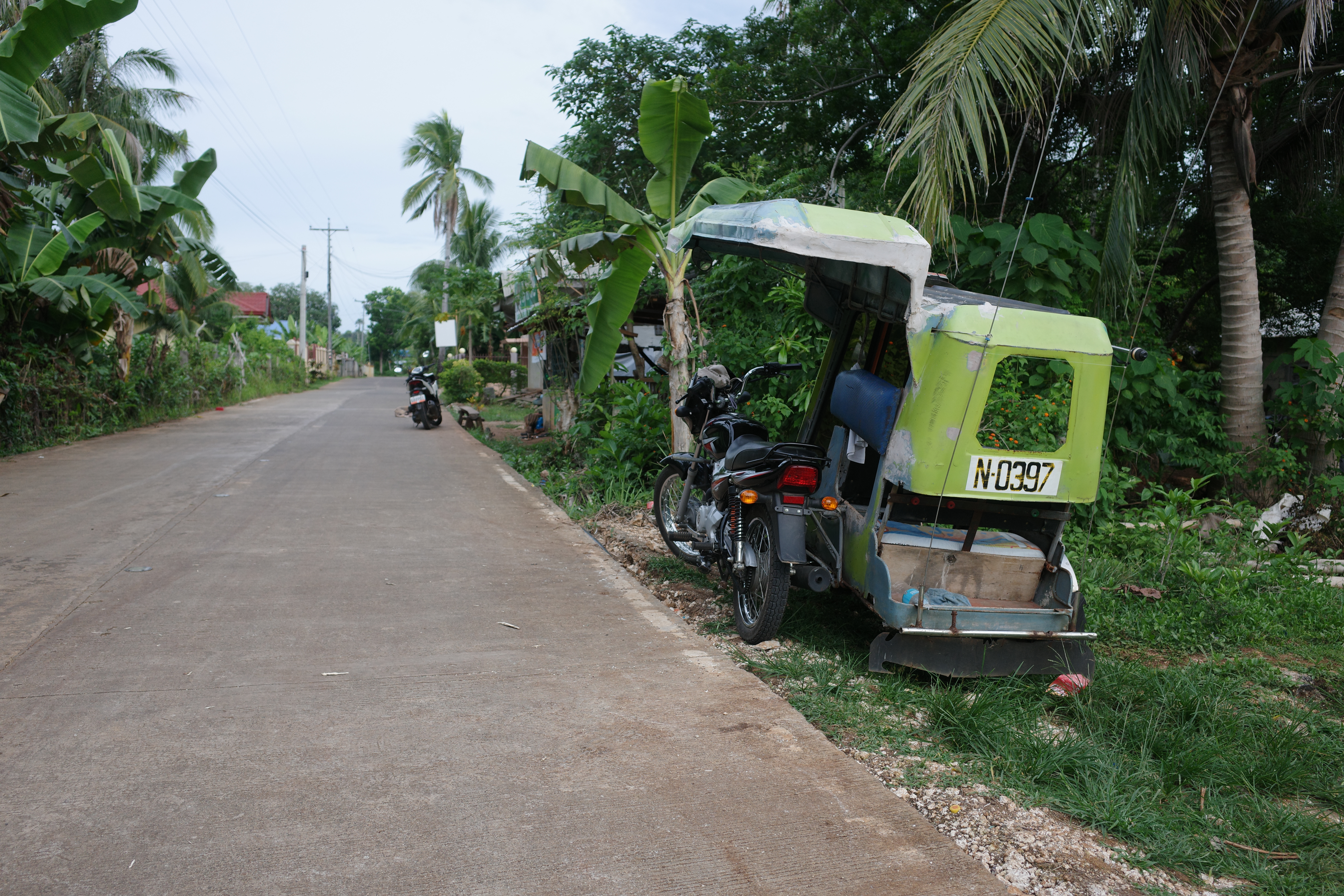
Tricycles are a common means of getting around Camotes

== Education ==
There are two tertiary educational institutions on the islands: the local campus of Cebu Technological University, and Mount Moriah College. Camotes Hillside Academy offers private education from kindergarten to secondary levels.

== See also ==
- Battle of Camotes Islands
- Camotes Sea
