= Poro (disambiguation) =

Poro may refer to:

- Operation Poro, a planned Soviet invasion of the Scandinavian peninsula in the 1930s
- Poro, a secret society of Sierra Leone and Liberia
- Poro, Cebu, a municipality in the Philippines
- Poro (opera), an opera seria by George Frideric Handel
- Poro Island, an island in the Philippines
- Poro Point, a headland in the Philippines
- Poro Region, a region in Ivory Coast, in Savanes District
- Plain old Ruby object, a computer programming concept
- Poro, a fictional creature from the video game League of Legends
