= Battle of Camotes Islands =

- Part of the Pacific Theatre of World War II
Date	15 January 1945 - 31 January 1945
Location	Poro Island, Philippines 10°40′N 124°27′E
Result	Allied victory

Belligerents
Allies; United States; Commonwealth of the Philippines	Axis; Empire of Japan

Commanders and leaders
United States General John R. Hodge (Commonwealth of the Philippines) Ruperto C. Kangleon	(Empire of Japan) Tomoyuki Yamashita

Units involved
7th Infantry Division (United States) (Commonwealth of the Philippines) 92nd Infantry Division (Philippine Commonwealth Army)	(Empire of Japan) ?

Strength
1 battalion, 4 PT boats	?

Casualties and losses
?	?

The Battle of Camotes Islands in the Pacific campaign of World War II was the amphibious invasion of the Poro Island in the Philippines by United States forces, who fought against the Imperial Japanese Army in the Philippines from 17 October - 26 December 1944. The operation was a small part of the Philippines campaign of 1944–45 for the recapture and liberation of the entire Philippine Archipelago and to end almost three years of Japanese occupation.

== History ==
As stories about Japanese torturing and killing about 300 local inhabitants on 29 December 1944 in Pilar of Ponson Island reached Leyte, General John R. Hodge ordered a battalion landing team from the 7th Infantry Division to capture Ponson on 15 January 1945. The naval protection was provided by four PT boats under command of Lieutenant Commander Leeson on PT-134. The team found Ponson evacuated by Japanese, after landed unopposed on north and south tips of the island.

On 18 January, the landing force left Ponson Island and established a beachhead on Poro Island. On 19 January encounters with the Japanese garrison were reported. On 23 January, Japanese positions on "Hill 854" were encountered. The Japanese resistance was eliminated on 31 January 1945, and US forces returned to Leyte on 2 February. Control over Poro Island was transferred to the 2nd battalion of the 94th infantry regiment of the Commonwealth of the Philippines army.
