= Rhea Gullas =

Filipino politician (born 1988)

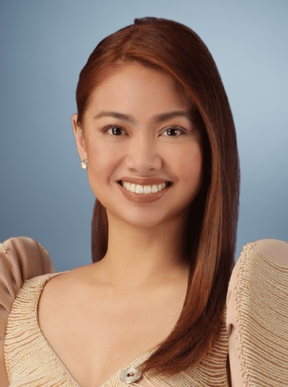
- Official portrait, 2025

Member of the House of Representatives of the Philippines from Cebu's 1st congressional district
- Incumbent
- Assumed office June 30, 2022
- Preceded by: Eduardo Gullas

Personal details
- Born: Rhea Mae Aquino; August 9, 1988 (age 37)
- Party: NUP (2026–present); 1CEBU (2021–present); Alayon (local party; 2021–present)
- Other political affiliations: Lakas (2024–2026); Nacionalista (2021–2024)
- Spouse: Gerald Anthony Gullas Jr.
- Occupation: Politician

Rhea Mae Aquino Gullas (born August 9, 1988) is a Filipino politician who currently serves as the representative of Cebu's 1st congressional district in the House of Representatives of the Philippines since 2022.

== Early life ==
Gullas was born on August 9, 1988, in the Philippines.

== Political career ==
She was elected as representative of Cebu's 1st congressional district to the 19th Congress during the 2022 election. She ran unopposed. She filed bills proposing for the cityhood of Minglanilla and San Fernando, and the creation of an 8th Cebu district from the 1st district.

Gullas secured another mandate in the 2025 election.

== Personal life ==
Gullas is married to Samsam Gullas, the mayor of Talisay, Cebu.
