= Cinnamomum cebuense =

Scientific classification
- Kingdom: Plantae
- Clade: Tracheophytes
- Clade: Angiosperms
- Clade: Magnoliids
- Order: Laurales
- Family: Lauraceae
- Genus: Cinnamomum
- Species: C. cebuense

Binomial name
- Cinnamomum cebuense Kosterm.

Species of tree

Cinnamomum cebuense, the Cebu cinnamon or, locally, kaningag, is a species of cinnamon endemic to Cebu Island, Philippines. It was first discovered in Cantipla, Cebu in mid-1980s and described by Kostermans in 1986. The tree is endemic to the island of Cebu but several trees have been found in neighboring Camotes Islands and Siquijor Island.
