= San Francisco, Cebu =

Municipality in Cebu, Philippines

San Francisco
- Municipality
- Municipality of San Francisco
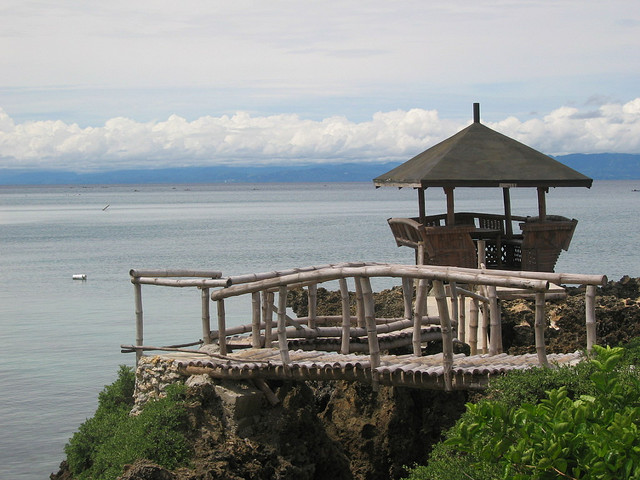
- Mangodlong Rock Beach Resort

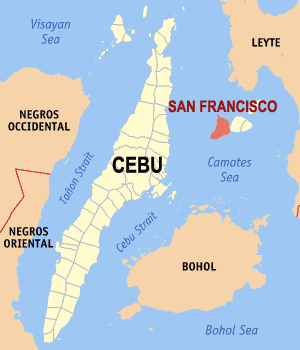
- Map of Cebu with San Francisco highlighted
- Interactive map of San Francisco
- Location within the Philippines
- Coordinates: 10°39′N 124°21′E
- Country: Philippines
- Region: Central Visayas
- Province: Cebu
- District: 5th district
- Named for: St. Francis of Assisi
- Barangays: 15 (see Barangays)

Government
  - Type: Sangguniang Bayan
  - Mayor: Alfredo A. Arquillano Jr. (One Cebu)
  - Vice Mayor: Aly A. Arquillano (One Cebu)
  - Representative: Vincent Franco D. Frasco (One Cebu)
  - Municipal Council: Members: Aaron A. Capao Jr.; Christie N. Gok-ong; Rey A. Tindoy; Emelia M. Bacus; Aurelia P. Andrade; Allan Arrojado; Joseph S. Isok; Toton Maningo
  - Electorate: 39,021 voters (2025)

Area
  - Total: 106.93 km^{2} (41.29 sq mi)
- Elevation: 29 m (95 ft)
- Highest elevation: 774 m (2,539 ft)
- Lowest elevation: 0 m (0 ft)

Population (2024 census)
  - Total: 61,092
  - Density: 571.33/km^{2} (1,479.7/sq mi)
  - Households: 13,957

Economy
  - Income class: 1st municipal income class
  - Poverty incidence: 30.67% (2023)
  - Revenue: ₱ 260.6 million (2024)
  - Assets: ₱ 954.7 million (2024)
  - Expenditure: ₱ 217.1 million (2024)
  - Liabilities: ₱ 479 million (2024)

Service provider
  - Electricity: Camotes Electric Cooperative (CELCO)
- Time zone: UTC+8 (PST)
- ZIP code: 6050
- PSGC: 072242000
- IDD : area code: +63 (0)32
- Native languages: Forohanon; Cebuano; Tagalog
- Website: sanfranciscocamotes.gov.ph

San Francisco, officially the Municipality of San Francisco (Cebuano: Lungsod sa San Francisco; Tagalog: Bayan ng San Francisco), is a municipality in the province of Cebu, Philippines. According to the 2024 census, it has a population of 61,092 people.

== History ==
=== Protohistory ===
Carl Guthe, director of the University of Michigan Anthropological Museum, during his 1923–25 collecting trip and explorations of archaeological sites in the Philippines, conducted an archeological dig in a cave site on Tulang. Located on the southeastern coast of the island, the cave measures about 3.7 by 2.7 metres (12 by 9 feet). Guthe reported it to contain bone fragments and teeth of about 60 individuals. Associated grave goods included earthenware pottery, shell bracelets, bronze and iron artefacts (iron tang, bronze chisel, iron blade), glass and stone beads, hammerstone and pestle. Filed teeth were also recovered from this site. (Note: Carl Guthe explored 485 sites comprising 120 caves, 134 burial grounds and 231 graves all over the Philippines that are contained in an inventory report now deposited at the University of Michigan.)

=== 21st century ===
Just before Typhoon Yolanda struck in November 2013, the mayor of San Francisco, Mayor Alfredo "Al" Arquillano. Jr., ordered the evacuation of all the residents of Tulang Island (approximately 1,000) to the main island. This was credited with saving their lives as all houses on the island (about 500) were completely destroyed.

== Geography ==
San Francisco consists primarily of Pacijan (also known as Pajican) and Tulang (area less than 1 square kilometre (0.39 sq mi), just north of Pacijan) islands, which are part of the Camotes Islands (which also include Poro and Ponson islands). They are located east of the main island of Cebu, south and west of Leyte and north of Bohol.

San Francisco is bordered to the north by the Province of Leyte in the Camotes Sea, to the west is the Camotes Sea Facing Catmon, to the east is the island of Poro with town of Poro and to the south is the Camotes Sea.

=== Pacijan (Pajican) Island ===
Pacijan Island is about 14.75 kilometres (9.17 mi) long and 8.5 kilometres (5.3 mi) wide. A 1,400-metre (1,530 yd) causeway crosses the mangrove swamp to connect Pacijan and Poro islands. It was constructed during the Spanish era, to bridge the islands for easier trading and attending services in Poro church.

=== Tulang ===
Tulang island (known locally as Tulang Diot) is a five-minute boat ride from Tulang Dako on the main island of Pacijan. Both Tulang Diot and Tulang Dako are part of Esperanza barangay. The islet is almost entirely covered with coconut palms and measures about 1.6 by 0.6 kilometres (1.0 by 0.4 mi): the residential area is confined to a small triangle at the southern end. Total area is less than 1 km^{2} (0.39 sq mi) or 40 ha (100 acres), of which only 3.5 ha (8.6 acres) (8.8%) is inhabited.

=== Barangays ===
San Francisco is politically subdivided into 15 barangays. Each barangay consists of puroks and some have sitios.

PSGC	Barangay	Population			±% p.a.	
		2024		2010		
0702242002	Cabunga‑an	3.6%	2,226	1,764	▴	1.62%
0702242003	Campo	5.1%	3,123	2,517	▴	1.50%
0702242004	Consuelo	9.4%	5,750	4,827	▴	1.21%
0702242006	Esperanza	10.4%	6,370	5,629	▴	0.86%
0702242007	Himensulan	3.8%	2,331	2,169	▴	0.50%
0702242001	Montealegre	2.8%	1,735	1,288	▴	2.07%
0702242008	Northern Poblacion	7.8%	4,786	3,779	▴	1.64%
0702242009	San Isidro	7.1%	4,346	3,668	▴	1.18%
0702242010	Santa Cruz	8.9%	5,465	4,717	▴	1.02%
0702242011	Santiago	3.9%	2,412	2,132	▴	0.85%
0702242012	Sonog	6.2%	3,799	3,366	▴	0.84%
0702242013	Southern Poblacion	6.8%	4,143	3,453	▴	1.26%
0702242014	Unidos	1.6%	992	1,035	▾	−0.29%
0702242015	Union	8.2%	5,023	4,721	▴	0.43%
0702242016	Western Poblacion	4.4%	2,679	2,292	▴	1.08%
	Total		61,092	47,357	▴	1.77%

=== Climate ===
Climate data for San Francisco, Cebu
Month	Jan	Feb	Mar	Apr	May	Jun	Jul	Aug	Sep	Oct	Nov	Dec	Year
Mean daily maximum °C (°F)	28 (82)	29 (84)	29 (84)	30 (86)	30 (86)	30 (86)	29 (84)	29 (84)	29 (84)	29 (84)	29 (84)	29 (84)	29 (84)
Mean daily minimum °C (°F)	22 (72)	22 (72)	22 (72)	23 (73)	25 (77)	25 (77)	25 (77)	25 (77)	25 (77)	24 (75)	24 (75)	23 (73)	24 (75)
Average precipitation mm (inches)	78 (3.1)	57 (2.2)	84 (3.3)	79 (3.1)	118 (4.6)	181 (7.1)	178 (7.0)	169 (6.7)	172 (6.8)	180 (7.1)	174 (6.9)	128 (5.0)	1,598 (62.9)
Average rainy days	16.7	13.8	17.3	18.5	23.2	26.5	27.1	26.0	26.4	27.5	24.6	21.0	268.6
Source: Meteoblue

== Demographics ==
Population census of San Francisco
Year	Pop.	±% p.a.
1903	8,110	—
1918	10,772	+1.91%
1939	16,980	+2.19%
1948	19,286	+1.42%
1960	20,894	+0.67%
1970	23,028	+0.98%
1975	27,766	+3.82%
1980	28,806	+0.74%
1990	36,521	+2.40%
1995	39,115	+1.29%
2000	41,327	+1.19%
2007	44,588	+1.05%
2010	47,357	+2.22%
2015	55,180	+2.95%
2020	59,236	+1.50%
2024	61,092	+0.74%
Source: Philippine Statistics Authority

=== Language ===
Cebuano is the main dialect of San Francisco.

The town is home to the Porohanon language, one of the most endangered languages in the Visayas. The language is only used in the Poro islands. The language is classified as distinct from Sebwano (Bisaya) by the Komisyon ng Wikang Filipino and is vital to the culture and arts of the Porohanon people.

== Economy ==
Poverty incidence of San Francisco (%)

Source: Philippine Statistics Authority

== Sources ==
- Alkuino, Xerxes (8 March 2015). "Lake water is suitable for crops". Cebu Provincial Government. Archived from the original on 2 April 2015.
- Groombridge, B. & Wright, L., eds. (1982). The IUCN Amphibia–reptilia Red Data Book. International Union for Conservation of Nature and Natural Resources. Species Survival Commission. ISBN 9782880326012.
- Guthe, Carl E. (1927). "The University of Michigan Philippine Expedition" (PDF). American Anthropologist. 29 (1): 69–76. doi:10.1525/aa.1927.29.1.02a00040. hdl:2027.42/75181. ISSN 1548-1433.
- Magsalay, Perla M. (2010). "PHILIPPINES INTRODUCTION - Ramsar Sites Information Service" (PDF). Haribon Foundation. ASEAN Centre for Biodiversity. pp. 36–37. Archived from the original on 15 December 2010.
- McElroy, Andy (15 November 2013). "Evacuation saves whole island from Typhoon Haiyan". United Nations Office for Disaster Risk Reduction. Archived from the original on 19 November 2013.
