= Tudela, Cebu =

Municipality in Cebu, Philippines

Tudela
- Municipality
- Municipality of Tudela
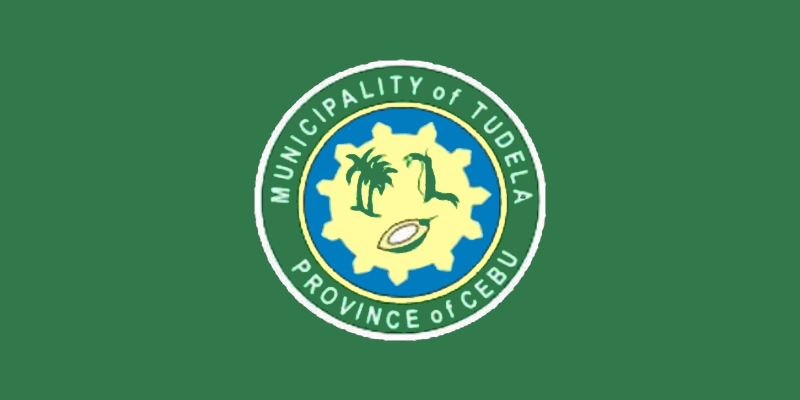
- Flag

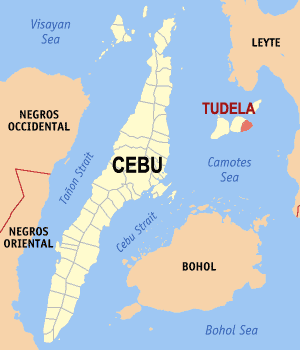
- Map of Cebu with Tudela highlighted
- Interactive map of Tudela
- Location within the Philippines
- Coordinates: 10°38′10″N 124°28′12″E
- Country: Philippines
- Region: Central Visayas
- Province: Cebu
- District: 5th district
- Barangays: 11 (see Barangays)

Government
  - Type: Sangguniang Bayan
  - Mayor: Greman B. Solante (One Cebu)
  - Vice Mayor: Lymarne O. Yu (One Cebu)
  - Representative: Vincent Franco D. Frasco (One Cebu)
  - Municipal Council: Members: Editha L. Diocampo; Lycel S. Estremos; Meldred E. Otadoy; Jey O. Belarmino; Nelson C. Sumalinog; Emilia P. Lativo; Erwin P. Yu; Eddie S. Portarcos
  - Electorate: 8,914 voters (2025)

Area
  - Total: 33.02 km^{2} (12.75 sq mi)
- Elevation: 65 m (213 ft)
- Highest elevation: 377 m (1,237 ft)
- Lowest elevation: 0 m (0 ft)

Population (2024 census)
  - Total: 11,638
  - Density: 352.5/km^{2} (912.8/sq mi)
  - Households: 3,288

Economy
  - Income class: 4th municipal income class
  - Poverty incidence: 18.92% (2023)
  - Revenue: ₱ 96.78 million (2024)
  - Assets: ₱ 451.1 million (2024)
  - Expenditure: ₱ 31.56 million (2024)
  - Liabilities: ₱ 133.7 million (2024)

Service provider
  - Electricity: Camotes Electric Cooperative (CELCO)
- Time zone: UTC+8 (PST)
- ZIP code: 6051
- PSGC: 072253000
- IDD : area code: +63 (0)32
- Native languages: Forohanon; Cebuano; Tagalog

Tudela, officially the Municipality of Tudela (Cebuano: Lungsod sa Tudela; Tagalog: Bayan ng Tudela), is a municipality in the province of Cebu, Philippines. According to the 2024 census, it has a population of 11,638 people, making it the least populated municipality in the province.

The town celebrates the fiesta of parish patron Our Lady of the Immaculate Conception each 8 December.

== Geography ==
Tudela is eight kilometres (5 mi) east of the town center of Poro. Along with the town of Poro, Tudela is located on Poro Island. Tudela is bordered to the north by the Province of Leyte in the Camotes Sea, to the west is the town of Poro, to the east is the island of Ponson with town of Pilar and the Province of Leyte, and to the south is the Camotes Sea.

The town center comprises two barangays: Northern and Southern Poblacion. The nearly symmetrical arrangement of the streets allows pedestrians to navigate easily while viewing old houses (early 1900s) standing side by side with new ones.

=== Barangays ===
Tudela is politically subdivided into 11 barangays. Each barangay consists of puroks and some have sitios.

PSGC	Barangay	Population			±% p.a.	
		2024		2010		
072253001	Buenavista	4.7%	547	485	▴	0.84%
072253002	Calmante	12.6%	1,464	1,291	▴	0.88%
072253003	Daan Secante	4.0%	460	415	▴	0.72%
072253004	General	9.3%	1,079	1,028	▴	0.34%
072253005	McArthur	10.4%	1,208	977	▴	1.48%
072253006	Northern Poblacion	3.8%	442	264	▴	3.64%
072253007	Puertobello	26.4%	3,067	2,578	▴	1.21%
072253008	Santander	4.9%	565	593	▾	−0.34%
072253009	Secante Bag‑o	5.0%	577	508	▴	0.89%
072253010	Southern Poblacion	6.6%	763	696	▴	0.64%
072253011	Villahermosa	9.7%	1,124	1,024	▴	0.65%
	Total		11,638	9,859	▴	1.16%

=== Climate ===
Climate data for Tudela, Cebu
Month	Jan	Feb	Mar	Apr	May	Jun	Jul	Aug	Sep	Oct	Nov	Dec	Year
Mean daily maximum °C (°F)	28 (82)	29 (84)	29 (84)	30 (86)	30 (86)	30 (86)	29 (84)	29 (84)	29 (84)	29 (84)	29 (84)	29 (84)	29 (84)
Mean daily minimum °C (°F)	22 (72)	22 (72)	22 (72)	23 (73)	25 (77)	25 (77)	25 (77)	25 (77)	25 (77)	24 (75)	24 (75)	23 (73)	24 (75)
Average precipitation mm (inches)	78 (3.1)	57 (2.2)	84 (3.3)	79 (3.1)	118 (4.6)	181 (7.1)	178 (7.0)	169 (6.7)	172 (6.8)	180 (7.1)	174 (6.9)	128 (5.0)	1,598 (62.9)
Average rainy days	16.7	13.8	17.3	18.5	23.2	26.5	27.1	26.0	26.4	27.5	24.6	21.0	268.6
Source: Meteoblue

== Demographics ==
Population census of Tudela
Year	Pop.	±% p.a.
1903	3,561	—
1918	4,896	+2.15%
1939	6,703	+1.51%
1948	6,837	+0.22%
1960	7,380	+0.64%
1970	8,052	+0.87%
1975	9,020	+2.30%
1980	9,611	+1.28%
1990	9,537	−0.08%
1995	9,358	−0.35%
2000	10,401	+2.29%
2007	11,266	+1.11%
2010	9,859	−4.74%
2015	11,296	+2.63%
2020	11,304	+0.01%
2024	11,638	+0.70%
Source: Philippine Statistics Authority

=== Languages ===
Local dialect is Cebuano. Waray is also spoken due to its proximity to Leyte.

The town is home to the Porohanon language, one of the most endangered languages in the Visayas. The language is only used in the Poro islands. The language is classified as distinct from Cebuano (Bisaya) by the Komisyon ng Wikang Filipino and is vital to the culture and arts of the Porohanon people.

== Economy ==
Poverty incidence of Tudela (%)

Source: Philippine Statistics Authority

== Transportation ==
Tudela may be reached by boat through Poro port. A boat (called Jomalia) typically takes 2 hours from Danao pier. A fast craft (called Ocean Jet) takes 2 hours from Pier 1, Cebu City. Motorcycles, tricycles and jeepneys are available for ground transportation on arrival.
