= Carl E. Guthe =

American academic and anthropologist

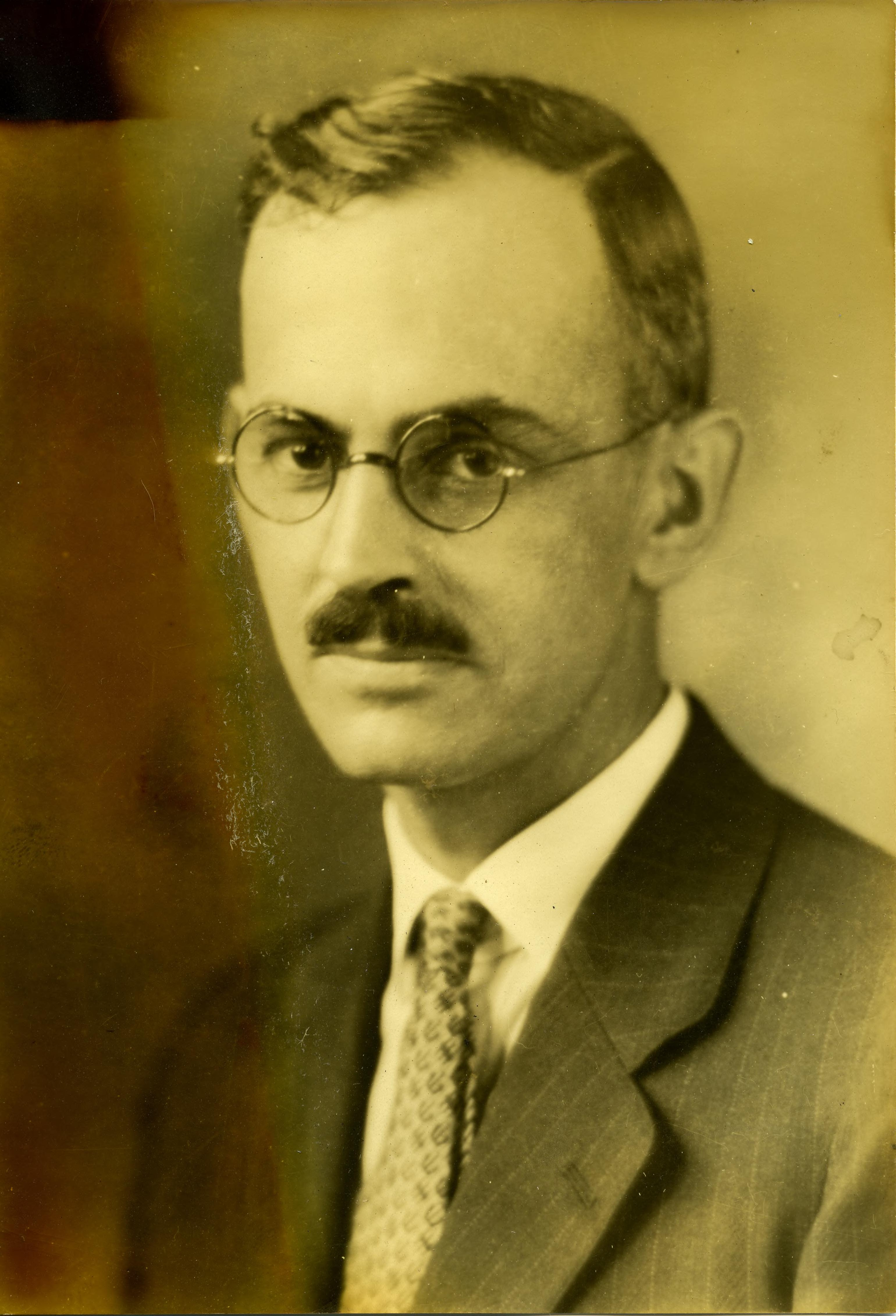
- Born: June 1, 1893; Kearney, Nebraska, US
- Died: July 24, 1974 (aged 81); Knoxville, Tennessee, US
- Known for: Philippine Collection

Academic background
- Education: University of Michigan; Harvard University

Academic work
- Discipline: anthropology
- Institutions: University of Michigan

Carl Eugen Guthe (June 1, 1893 – July 24, 1974) was an American academic and anthropologist.

== Early life and education ==
Guthe was born in Kearney, Nebraska, in 1893, son of Karl Eugen Guthe, Professor of Physics and Dean of the Graduate Department of the University of Michigan, and Clara Belle née Ware of Grand Rapids, Michigan. Within a year his family moved to Ann Arbor, Michigan, when his father took a position at the University of Michigan. He graduated from the University of Michigan in 1914, then went on to receive two degrees in anthropology from Harvard University – an M.A. in 1915 and a Ph.D. in 1917.

== Career ==
Guthe assisted Alfred Kidder with his excavations at Pecos, New Mexico; their efforts to ship the skeletons found there to the Peabody Museum at Harvard resulted in their being suspected of espionage.

He was a founding member of the department of Anthropology at the University of Michigan as well as its first chair. He was the first director of the school's new Museum of Anthropology in 1928 and became the Director of University Museums in 1936. He left the university in 1944 to take up the appointment as director of the New York State Museum. He created the Society for American Archaeology and began publishing the American Antiquity journal.

Carl Guthe headed an archaeological expedition to the Philippines from 1922 to 1925, which was used to create the Philippine Collection at the Museum of Anthropology. He went to several locations in the Philippines to look for archaeological evidence. There are 485 sites represented in the total collection, 120 caves, 134 burial grounds and 231 graves. These excavations relied on the work and information of Filipino residents, although Guthe himself didn't consider their perspectives important to the artifacts excavated.

== Personal life ==
Guthe married Grace Ethel (née McDonald) on 12 September 1916 in Wayne, Michigan. They had three sons: Karl Frederick, Alfred Kidder, and James. Karl Frederick Guthe (1919–1994) was professor emeritus of biological sciences at the University of Michigan. Alfred Kidder Guthe (1920–1983) specialised in the archaeology of the US eastern seaboard, and became director of the Frank H. McClung Museum in Tennessee.

== Death and legacy ==
Carl Guthe died in Knoxville, Tennessee, in 1974, at the age of 81. His contribution of Philippine artifacts remains significant within the University of Michigan Museum of Anthropology collection.
