= Poro Island =

Island in the Philippines

- Location in the Philippines Poro Island (Philippines)

Geography
- Location: Camotes Sea
- Coordinates: 10°40′N 124°27′E
- Archipelago: Philippines
- Area: 96.6 km^{2} (37.3 sq mi)
- Length: 13 km (8.1 mi)
- Width: 9.8 km (6.09 mi)
- Highest elevation: 1,240 ft (378 m)
- Highest point: Three Peaks

Administration
- Philippines
- Province: Cebu

Demographics
- Population: 36,508 (2015)
- Pop. density: 350/km^{2} (910/sq mi)
- Ethnic groups: Porohanon people

Additional information

Poro Island (Filipino: Pulo ng Poro) is an island in the province of Cebu, located east of Cebu Island and west of Leyte Island. Two municipalities, Poro and Tudela, are located on Poro Island. It is one of the four Camotes Islands along with Pacijan Island, Ponson Island, and Tulang Island. The island is one of the early Pacific contact sites between the East and the West.

== Geography ==
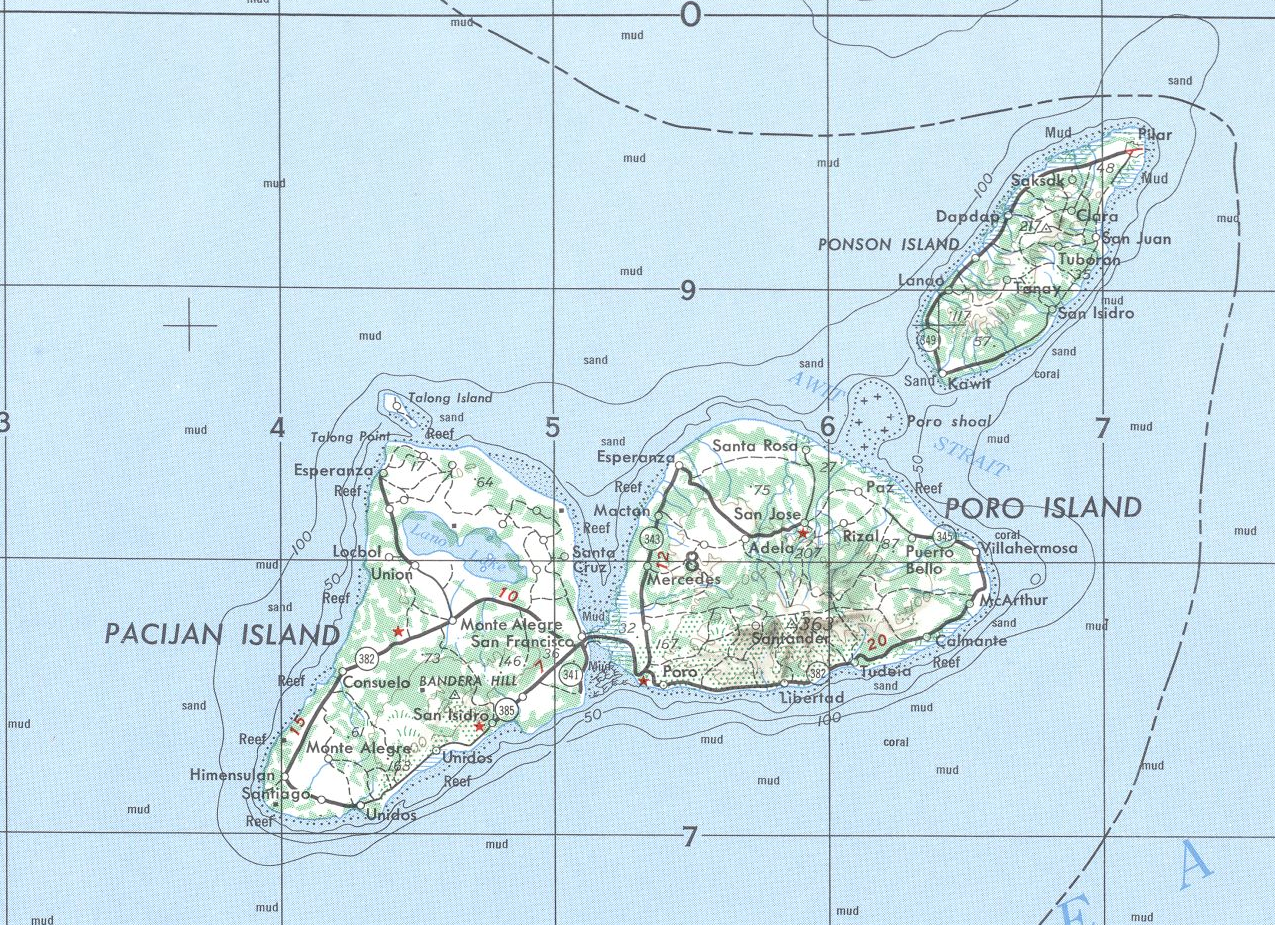
Location of municipalities of Poro and Tudela, and tourist attractions on Poro Island

Natural features:

- 1) Bukilat Cave
- 2) Busay Falls
- 3) Pangunuron Falls
- 4) Buho Rock

Beaches:

- 5) Flying Fish
- 6) Santa Rosa

=== Bukilat Cave ===
The island hosts various caves. One example is the Bukilat Cave which is a large natural cavern in the southeastern part of the island. Because of naturally formed piercings in its canopy, the interior is well illuminated. There are many stalactite and stalagmite formations in the cave. It was used as a shelter for Poro Island residents during the Japanese occupation of the Philippines during the World War II era.

=== Waterfalls ===
Busay and Pangunuron Falls are among the waterfalls in the island.

=== Buho Rock ===
Buho Rock is a hole in a cliff wall said to have been formed when a Spanish warship mistook it for an enemy ship in the mist and fired cannon into it. It is reached by a stone staircase, and offers views of Poro and the sea.

== Language ==
The Poro islands are home to the Porohanon language, one of the most endangered languages in the Visayas. The language is only used in the Camotes Islands, which are composed of four municipalities. The language is classified as distinct from Cebuano (Bisaya) by the Komisyon ng Wikang Filipino and is vital to the culture and arts of the Porohanon people.
