= Poro, Cebu =

Municipality in Cebu, Philippines

Poro
- Municipality
- Municipality of Poro
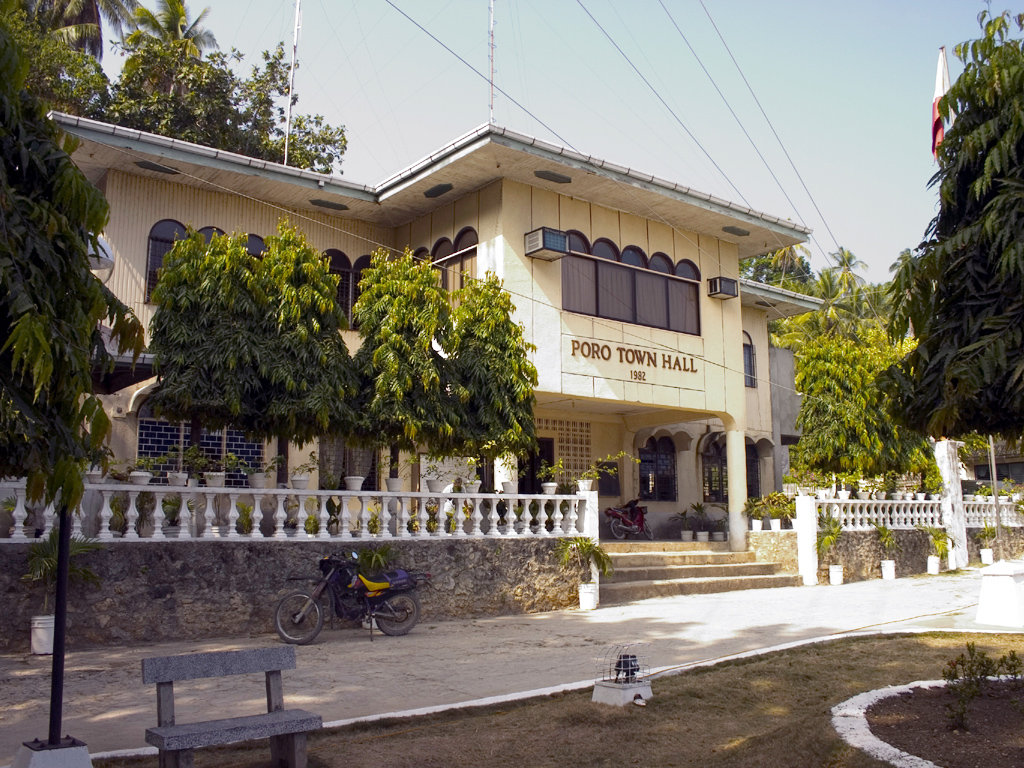
- Poro town hall

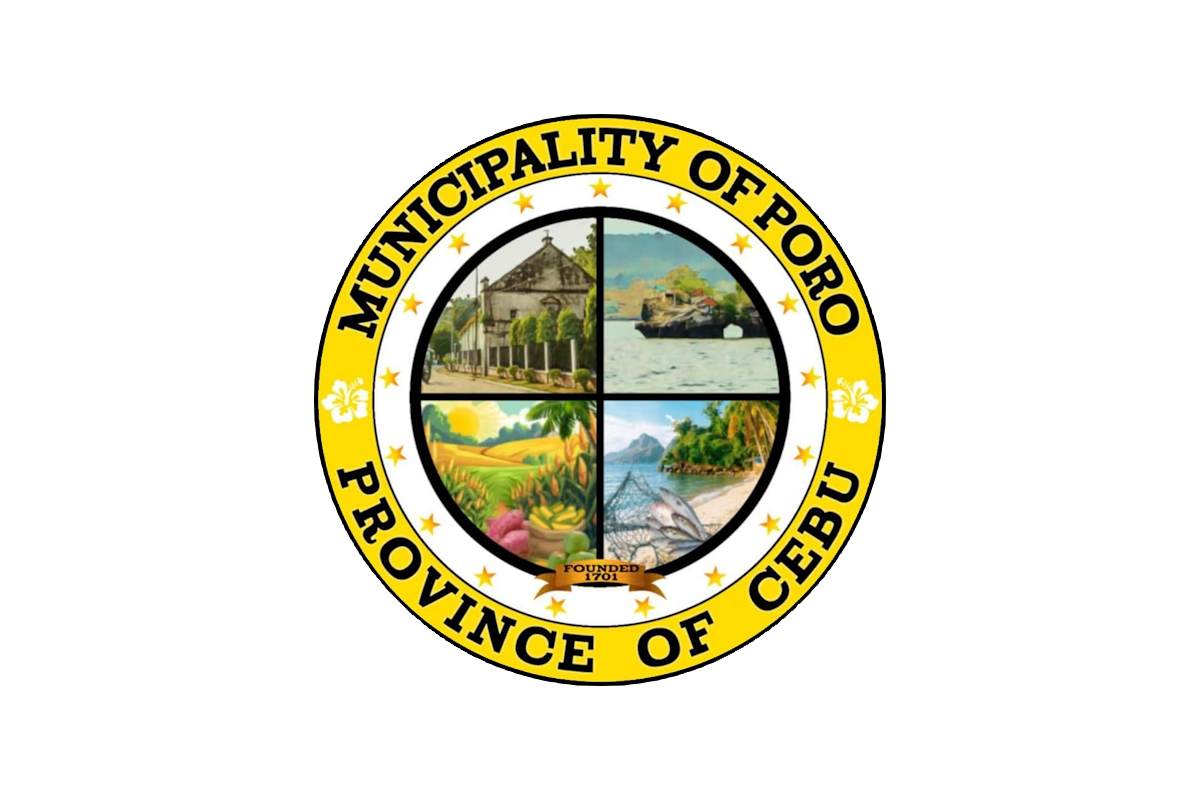
- Flag

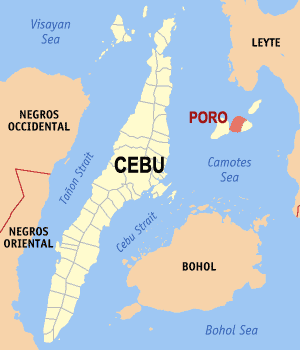
- Map of Cebu with Poro highlighted
- Interactive map of Poro
- Location within the Philippines
- Coordinates: 10°37′44″N 124°24′25″E
- Country: Philippines
- Region: Central Visayas
- Province: Cebu
- District: 5th district
- Founded: 17 December 1701
- Barangays: 17 (see Barangays)

Government
  - Type: Sangguniang Bayan
  - Mayor: Edgar G. Rama (One Cebu)
  - Vice Mayor: Dina Z. Rama (One Cebu)
  - Representative: Vincent Franco D. Frasco (One Cebu)
  - Municipal Council: Members: Ashley P. Otadoy; Jhayson R. Morata; Rogelio J. Gutierrez Jr.; Emilianito E. Borlasa; Andrew D. Zurita; Alfie D. Yuzon; Sally B. Estrera; Reno S. Culango
  - Electorate: 19,302 voters (2025)

Area
  - Total: 63.59 km^{2} (24.55 sq mi)
- Elevation: 48 m (157 ft)
- Highest elevation: 377 m (1,237 ft)
- Lowest elevation: 0 m (0 ft)

Population (2024 census)
  - Total: 26,908
  - Density: 423.1/km^{2} (1,096/sq mi)
  - Households: 6,900

Economy
  - Income class: 3rd municipal income class
  - Poverty incidence: 22.67% (2023)
  - Revenue: ₱ 147.7 million (2024)
  - Assets: ₱ 691.6 million (2024)
  - Expenditure: ₱ 95.82 million (2024)
  - Liabilities: ₱ 273.4 million (2024)

Service provider
  - Electricity: Camotes Electric Cooperative (CELCO)
- Time zone: UTC+8 (PST)
- ZIP code: 6049
- PSGC: 072238000
- IDD : area code: +63 (0)32
- Native languages: Forohanon; Cebuano

Poro, officially the Municipality of Poro (Cebuano: Lungsod sa Poro; Tagalog: Bayan ng Poro), is a municipality in the province of Cebu, Philippines. According to the 2024 census, it has a population of 26,908 people.

The patronal feast of Poro is celebrated on the third Friday of January, in honour of the Santo Niño de Cebu.

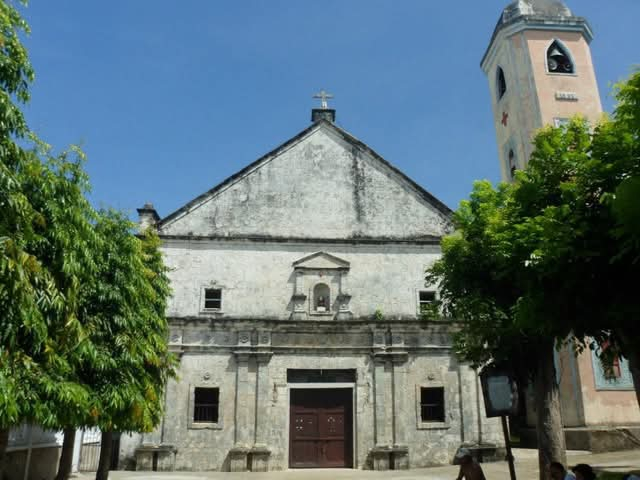
Sto. Niño de Cebu Parish Church in Poro, Camotes Islands, Cebu

== Geography ==
Poro is bordered to the north by the province of Leyte across the Camotes Sea; to the west by Pacijan Island, where the town of San Francisco is located; to the east by the town of Tudela; and to the south by the Camotes Sea.

Poro, along with the municipality of Tudela, is located on Poro Island of the Camotes Islands.

=== Barangays ===
Poro is politically subdivided into 17 barangays. Each barangay consists of puroks and some have sitios.

PSGC	Barangay	Population			±% p.a.	
		2024		2010		
072238001	Adela	6.5%	1,737	1,339	▴	1.82%
072238002	Altavista	3.6%	958	1,142	▾	−1.21%
072238003	Cagcagan	11.6%	3,114	3,238	▾	−0.27%
072238004	Cansabusab	2.1%	577	525	▴	0.66%
072238005	Daan Paz	3.4%	922	888	▴	0.26%
072238006	Eastern Poblacion	4.3%	1,158	886	▴	1.88%
072238007	Esperanza	12.4%	3,324	3,131	▴	0.42%
072238008	Libertad	4.9%	1,313	1,276	▴	0.20%
072238010	Mabini	4.7%	1,259	1,254	▴	0.03%
072238011	Mercedes	9.6%	2,585	2,294	▴	0.83%
072238012	Pagsa	4.4%	1,183	672	▴	4.00%
072238013	Paz	4.7%	1,252	1,206	▴	0.26%
072238014	Rizal	3.2%	871	817	▴	0.45%
072238015	San Jose	4.7%	1,255	1,136	▴	0.69%
072238016	Santa Rita	2.6%	705	860	▾	−1.37%
072238018	Teguis	5.2%	1,397	1,323	▴	0.38%
072238019	Western Poblacion	6.0%	1,602	1,511	▴	0.41%
	Total		26,908	23,498	▴	0.94%

=== Climate ===
Climate data for Poro, Cebu
Month	Jan	Feb	Mar	Apr	May	Jun	Jul	Aug	Sep	Oct	Nov	Dec	Year
Mean daily maximum °C (°F)	28 (82)	28 (82)	29 (84)	30 (86)	30 (86)	30 (86)	29 (84)	29 (84)	29 (84)	29 (84)	29 (84)	28 (82)	29 (84)
Mean daily minimum °C (°F)	22 (72)	22 (72)	22 (72)	23 (73)	25 (77)	25 (77)	25 (77)	25 (77)	25 (77)	24 (75)	24 (75)	23 (73)	24 (75)
Average precipitation mm (inches)	78 (3.1)	57 (2.2)	84 (3.3)	79 (3.1)	118 (4.6)	181 (7.1)	178 (7.0)	169 (6.7)	172 (6.8)	180 (7.1)	174 (6.9)	128 (5.0)	1,598 (62.9)
Average rainy days	16.7	13.8	17.3	18.5	23.2	26.5	27.1	26.0	26.4	27.5	24.6	21.0	268.6
Source: Meteoblue

== Demographics ==
Population census of Poro
Year	Pop.	±% p.a.
1903	4,991	—
1918	6,754	+2.04%
1939	11,520	+2.58%
1948	12,523	+0.93%
1960	13,736	+0.77%
1970	14,858	+0.79%
1975	16,535	+2.17%
1980	17,717	+1.39%
1990	19,150	+0.78%
1995	21,517	+2.21%
2000	21,397	−0.12%
2007	21,529	+0.08%
2010	23,498	+3.24%
2015	25,212	+1.35%
2020	26,232	+0.84%
2024	26,908	+0.61%
Source: Philippine Statistics Authority

=== Etymology and languages ===
The town's name is derived from the Waray-Waray word puro meaning "island". This how Camotes Island is called by Warays and Leyteños. Before the first municipality to be established in Camotes, puro meant the name of all the islands.

Aside from Cebuano, Waray, Tagalog, and English, the townsfolk also speak the local Porohanon language. Also known as Camotes Visayan, the language is mutually intelligible with other Visayan languages (e.g. Cebuano) spoken in the rest of the Camotes Islands, Cebu, other parts of the Visayas, and Northern Mindanao.

The town is home to the Porohanon language, one of the most endangered languages in the Visayas. The language is only used in the Poro islands. The language is classified as distinct from Cebuano by the Komisyon ng Wikang Filipino and is vital to the culture and arts of the Porohanon people. Porohanon is distinguished by the way the locals substitute /j/ sounds with /ʒ/, for instance Cebuano maayong buntag ("good morning") vocalised as maazong buntag in Porohanon. (Possibly occasions too a handover from the yeísmo phenomenon in Spanish.) Other dialectical variations include the Porohanon ara dira instead of the standard Cebuano na-a diha.

== Economy ==
Poverty incidence of Poro (%)

Source: Philippine Statistics Authority
