= Pilar, Cebu =

Municipality in Cebu, Philippines

Pilar
- Municipality
- Municipality of Pilar
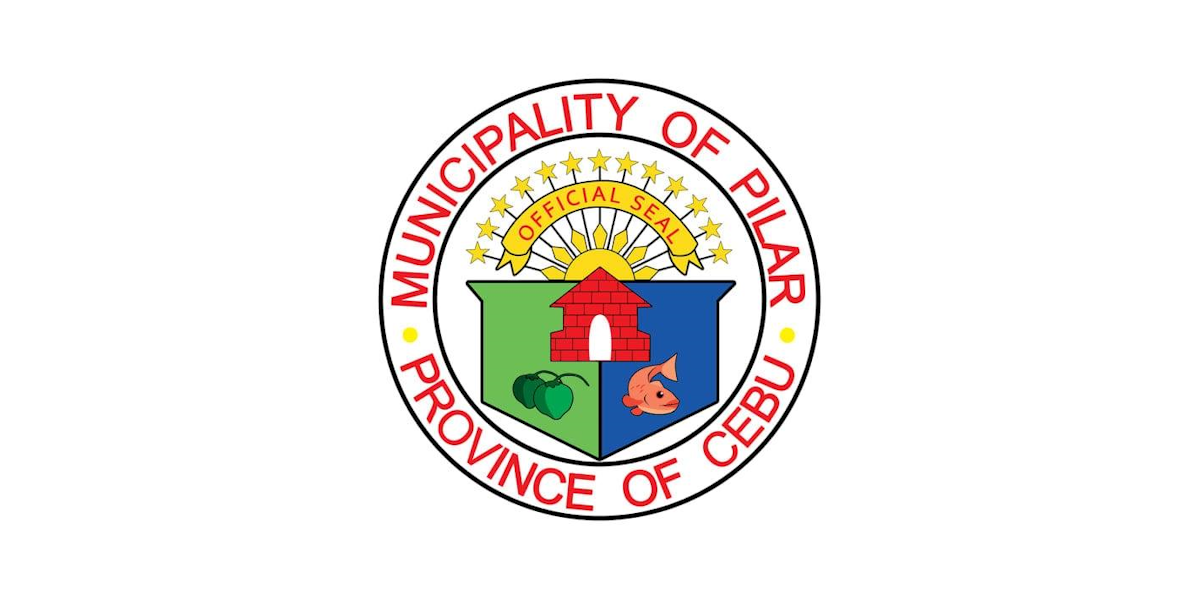
- Flag

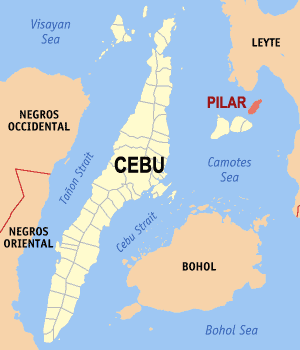
- Map of Cebu with Pilar highlighted
- Interactive map of Pilar
- Location within the Philippines
- Coordinates: 10°48′25″N 124°33′54″E
- Country: Philippines
- Region: Central Visayas
- Province: Cebu
- District: 5th district
- Barangays: 13 (see Barangays)

Government
  - Type: Sangguniang Bayan
  - Mayor: Manuel P. Santiago (One Cebu)
  - Vice Mayor: Chiziline S. Maratas (One Cebu)
  - Representative: Vincent Franco D. Frasco (One Cebu)
  - Municipal Council: Members: Mark E. Ybañez; Antonieto V. Ceballos; Antonieto L. Pedericos; Mario M. Pelostratos; Vigilius M. Santiago; Ruben L. Madrazo; Dolita Dales; Ernesto Salazar
  - Electorate: 9,607 voters (2025)

Area
  - Total: 32.42 km^{2} (12.52 sq mi)
- Elevation: 19 m (62 ft)
- Highest elevation: 615 m (2,018 ft)
- Lowest elevation: 0 m (0 ft)

Population (2024 census)
  - Total: 12,454
  - Density: 384.1/km^{2} (994.9/sq mi)
  - Households: 3,360

Economy
  - Income class: 5th municipal income class
  - Poverty incidence: 23.53% (2023)
  - Revenue: ₱ 133.8 million (2024)
  - Assets: ₱ 560.2 million (2024)
  - Expenditure: ₱ 70.89 million (2024)
  - Liabilities: ₱ 249.7 million (2024)

Service provider
  - Electricity: Camotes Electric Cooperative (CELCO)
- Time zone: UTC+8 (PST)
- ZIP code: 6048
- PSGC: 072236000
- IDD : area code: +63 (0)32
- Native languages: Cebuano; Tagalog

Pilar, officially the Municipality of Pilar (Cebuano: Lungsod sa Pilar; Tagalog: Bayan ng Pilar), is a municipality in the province of Cebu, Philippines. According to the 2024 census, it has a population of 12,454 people.

The municipality is contiguous with Ponson Island, one of the four Camotes Islands in the Camotes Sea (along with Pacijan Island, Poro Island, and Tulang Island). The island is about 10.6 kilometres (6.59 mi) long and 3.7 kilometres (2.30 mi) wide.

== Geography ==
=== Barangays ===
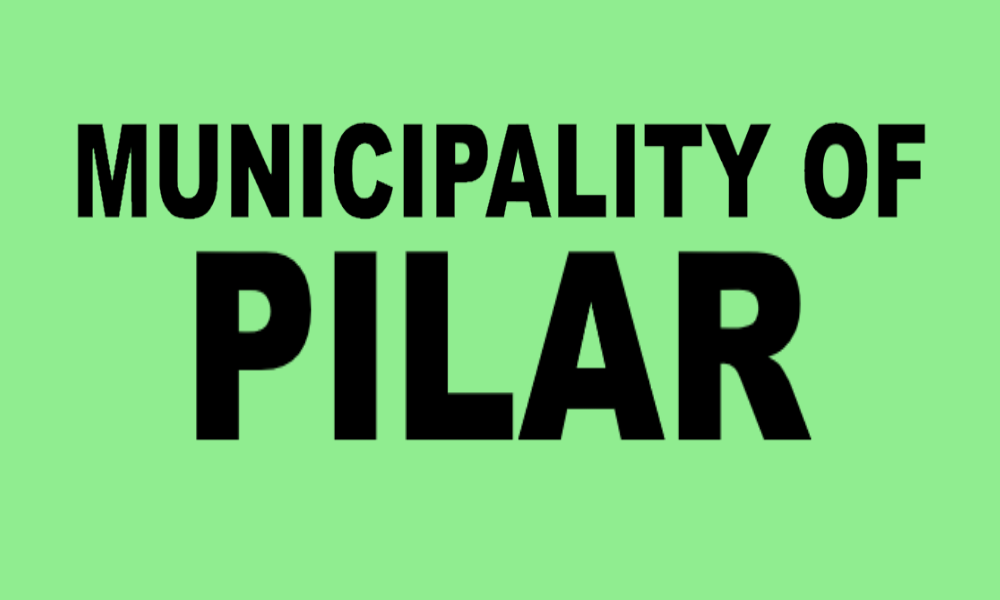
Former flag of Pilar

Pilar is politically subdivided into 13 barangays. Each barangay consists of puroks and some have sitios.

PSGC	Barangay	Population			±% p.a.	
		2024		2010		
072236001	Biasong	2.8%	345	360	▾	−0.29%
072236002	Cawit	15.5%	1,925	1,892	▴	0.12%
072236003	Dapdap	4.5%	563	781	▾	−2.25%
072236004	Esperanza	6.5%	815	851	▾	−0.30%
072236015	Imelda	4.7%	582	616	▾	−0.39%
072236005	Lanao	8.3%	1,029	990	▴	0.27%
072236006	Lower Poblacion	6.0%	745	578	▴	1.78%
072236007	Moabog	8.3%	1,034	1,007	▴	0.18%
072236008	Montserrat	9.7%	1,202	1,303	▾	−0.56%
072236011	San Isidro	3.9%	482	570	▾	−1.16%
072236012	San Juan	5.9%	730	799	▾	−0.62%
072236013	Upper Poblacion	6.9%	865	770	▴	0.81%
072236014	Villahermosa	8.0%	991	1,047	▾	−0.38%
	Total		12,454	11,564	▴	0.52%

=== Climate ===
Climate data for Pilar, Cebu
Month	Jan	Feb	Mar	Apr	May	Jun	Jul	Aug	Sep	Oct	Nov	Dec	Year
Mean daily maximum °C (°F)	28 (82)	29 (84)	29 (84)	30 (86)	30 (86)	30 (86)	29 (84)	29 (84)	29 (84)	29 (84)	29 (84)	29 (84)	29 (84)
Mean daily minimum °C (°F)	22 (72)	22 (72)	22 (72)	23 (73)	25 (77)	25 (77)	25 (77)	25 (77)	25 (77)	24 (75)	24 (75)	23 (73)	24 (75)
Average precipitation mm (inches)	78 (3.1)	57 (2.2)	84 (3.3)	79 (3.1)	118 (4.6)	181 (7.1)	178 (7.0)	169 (6.7)	172 (6.8)	180 (7.1)	174 (6.9)	128 (5.0)	1,598 (62.9)
Average rainy days	16.7	13.8	17.3	18.5	23.2	26.5	27.1	26.0	26.4	27.5	24.6	21.0	268.6
Source: Meteoblue

== Demographics ==
Population census of Pilar
Year	Pop.	±% p.a.
1903	4,461	—
1918	5,213	+1.04%
1939	8,142	+2.15%
1948	8,663	+0.69%
1960	8,816	+0.15%
1970	9,541	+0.79%
1975	10,624	+2.18%
1980	11,126	+0.93%
1990	11,499	+0.33%
1995	11,191	−0.51%
2000	11,226	+0.07%
2007	11,941	+0.86%
2010	11,564	−1.16%
2015	11,308	−0.43%
2020	12,506	+2.14%
2024	12,454	−0.10%
Source: Philippine Statistics Authority

=== Language ===
People in Pilar mainly speak Cebuano with an accent similar to the locals of Bohol. Like most Filipinos, Pilaranons may also speak Tagalog and English. Waray is also spoken due to its proximity to Leyte.

The town is home to the Porohanon language, one of the most endangered languages in the Visayas. The language is only used in the Poro islands. The language is classified as distinct from Sebwano (Bisaya) by the Komisyon ng Wikang Filipino and is vital to the culture and arts of the Porohanon people.

== Economy ==
Poverty incidence of Pilar (%)

Source: Philippine Statistics Authority
