= Tereso Dosdos =

Filipino lawyer and Congressman from 1934 to 1941

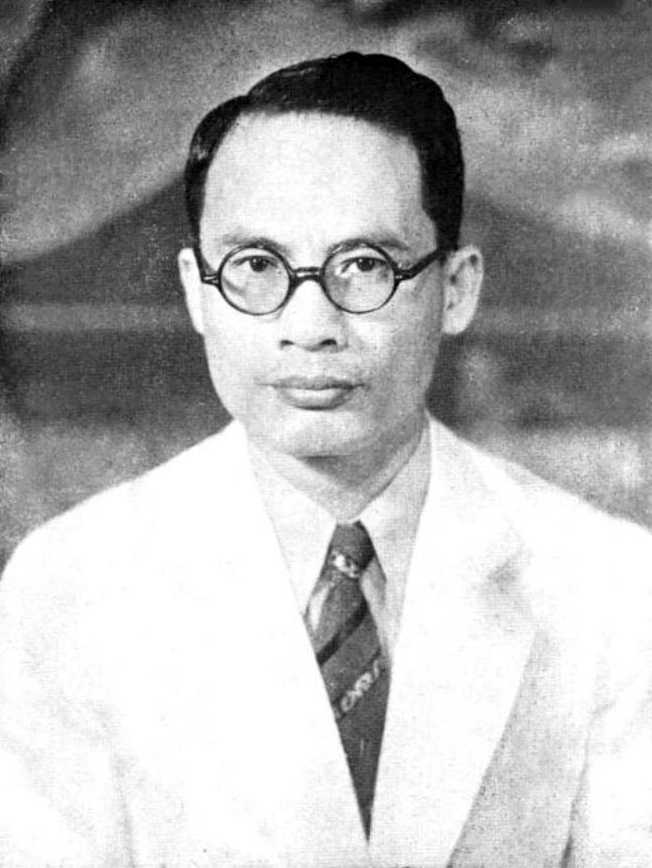
- Photograph from The Commercial & Industrial Manual of the Philippines, 1941

Member of the House of Representatives of Cebu's 1st District
- In office June 5, 1934 – September 16, 1935
- Preceded by: Buenaventura Rodriguez
- Succeeded by: Celestino Rodriguez
- In office December 30, 1938 – December 30, 1941
- Preceded by: Celestino Rodriguez
- Succeeded by: Celestino Rodriguez

Personal details
- Born: October 15, 1892 Borbon, Cebu, Captaincy General of the Philippines
- Died: July 1, 1997 (aged 104) Cebu City, Philippines
- Party: Nacionalista
- Education: Colegio de San Carlos; Escuela de Derecho de Manila

Tereso Mondigo Dosdos (October 15, 1892 – July 1, 1997) was a Filipino Visayan lawyer, judge, and legislator from Cebu, Philippines. He was considered the first Registrar of Deeds of the province of Cebu, the first Municipal Court Judge of Cebu, and first lawyer from Borbon, Cebu. He served as Member of the House of Representatives for Cebu's 6th District for two terms (1934–1935, 1938–1941).

== Early life and education ==
Tereso M. Dosdos was born on October 15, 1892. The son of Crispin Dosdos and Ana Mondigo, his hometown was in the municipality of Borbon, Cebu. He attended Colegio de San Carlos and acquired his law degree from the Escuela de Derecho in Manila. When he became a lawyer on September 26, 1921, he was considered the first lawyer from Borbon. He married Filomena Mangubat from the Mangubat clan of Cebu, and the couple had four children: Jorge, Luisa, Elena and Prescila.

== Career ==
Dosdos served as Registrar of Deeds of Cebu from 1925 to 1934, becoming the first to hold such position. He was the first Municipal Court Judge appointed for Cebu by then President Manuel L. Quezon. and he was again given the same appointment on July 11, 1947, by President Manuel Roxas. On March 29, 1946, he was appointed Second Deputy Commissioner of Immigration, ad interim, by then President Sergio Osmeña.

A prominent official of the Nacionalista Party, he was elected member of the 10th Philippine Legislature as representative of Cebu's old 1st legislative district from 1934 to 1935, defeating Wenceslao Fernan, the father of Marcelo Briones Fernan. The 1st district then was composed of the towns of Bogo, Borbon, Pilar, Catmon, Danao, San Francisco, Tabogon, Tudela, Poro and Sogod.

From January 24, 1939, to December 16, 1941, he was reelected to the same post and served in the 2nd National Assembly during the Commonwealth period. His victory was considered his biggest political feat as he defeated former Senator Celestino Rodriguez, who was then a veteran in politics.
