= Manuel Briones =

Filipino lawyer, legislator, and Supreme Court Associate Justice

The Honorable Manuel Briones
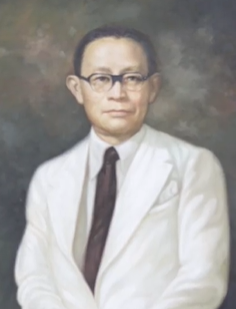

Senator of the Philippines
- In office December 30, 1951 – September 29, 1957
- Constituency: At-large
- In office June 2, 1931 – September 16, 1935 Serving with Sergio Osmeña
- Preceded by: Pedro Rodríguez
- Succeeded by: Position abolished
- Constituency: 10th district

51st Associate Justice of the Supreme Court of the Philippines
- In office September 15, 1945 – May 24, 1949
- Appointed by: Sergio Osmeña

Associate Justice of the Philippine Court of Appeals
- In office 1942–1945

Member of the Philippine House of Representatives from Cebu's 1st District
- In office 1919–1931
- Preceded by: José Hernaez
- Succeeded by: Buenaventura Rodriguez

Personal details
- Born: Manuel Cabahug Briones; January 1, 1893 Mandaue, Cebu, Captaincy General of the Philippines
- Died: September 29, 1957 (aged 64) Manila, Philippines
- Party: Nacionalista
- Spouse: Celestina Lorenzo
- Relations: Marcelo Briones Fernan (nephew)
- Children: 6, including Jose
- Education: Colegio-Seminario de San Carlos

Manuel Cabahug Briones (January 1, 1893 – September 29, 1957) was a Filipino Visayan lawyer, judge, and politician from Cebu, Philippines. He was the first Supreme Court Associate Justice from Cebu, and he was a former Associate Justice of the Court of Appeals, two-term Senator, Member of the House of Representative for four consecutive terms, and editor from Cebu, Philippines.

== Early life ==
Briones was born to parents Pedro Cabahug y Seno and Apolonia Engracia Briones in Mandaue, Cebu on January 1, 1893. After his mother died, Reverend Father Domingo Briones, his maternal uncle, took care of him and looked after his studies in Cebu City.

== Education and career ==
Briones studied in a private school owned by Antolin Frías, a writer and journalist in Cebú. Later, he acquired his bachelor's degree at the Colegio y Seminario de San Carlos and took up law at the Escuela de Derecho in Manila. On November 3, 1916, he was called to the bench.

He was part of the law firm together with Dionisio Abella Jakosalem and Paulino Gullas.

Additionally, he was a member of various international associations including the Royal Academy of Spanish-American Sciences and Arts, and of the Royal Academy of the Spanish Language.

He married Celestina Lorenzo and had six children, including former Cebu governor Jose L. Briones.

== Journalism ==
While he was studying, he began his journalistic career as part of the first newspaper in Cebuano language, Vicente Sotto's Ang Suga (The Light), in 1910. Then in 1911, he worked as a reporter for El Ideal, the publication of the Nacionalista Party and edited the Spanish newspapers La Revolucion (The Revolution), a periodical founded by Filemon Sotto, the brother of Vicente Sotto, La Tribuna (The Tribune) and El Espectador (The Viewer). Historian and scholar Epifanio delos Santos included his name on the list of promising young Filipino journalists.

== Politics ==
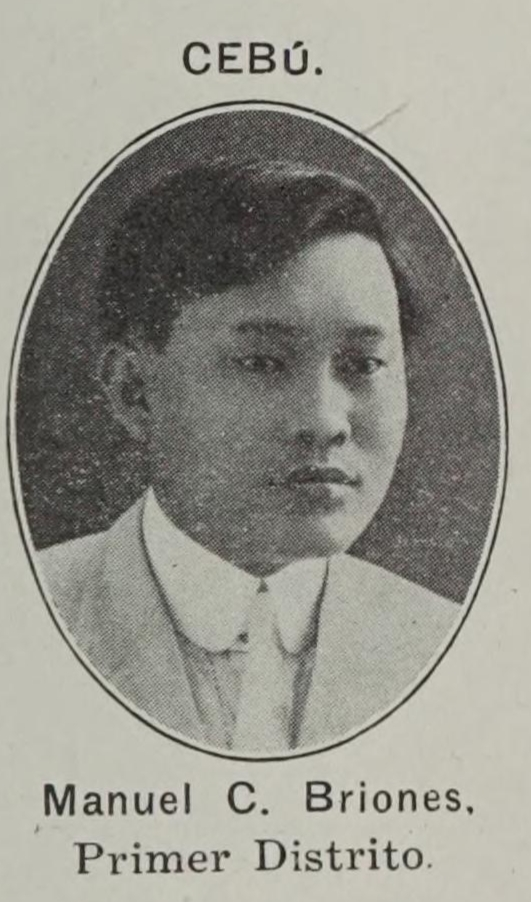
Briones as member of the Philippine House of Representatives, c. 1921

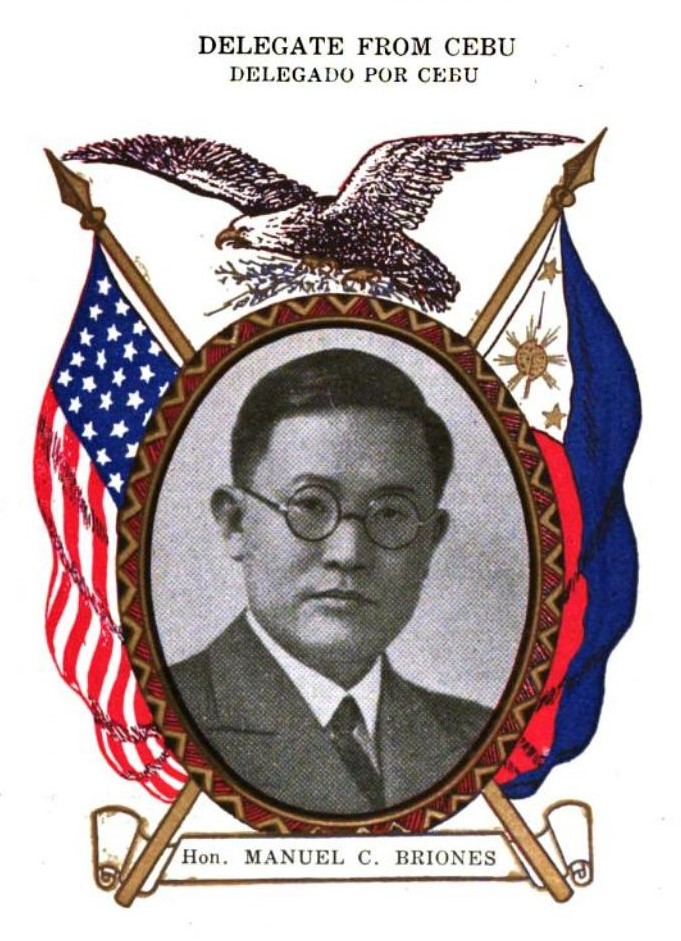
Briones as a delegate to the Philippine Constitutional Convention, published by Benipayo Press (c. 1935)

Briones was elected as representative of Cebu's old first congressional district for the 5th Philippine Legislature on June 3, 1919, and served for three more terms until the 8th Philippine Legislature in 1931. The old first district was composed of the towns Bogo, Borbon, Carmen, Catmon, Danao, Pilar, Poro, San Francisco, Sogod Tabogon, and Tudela,. He once was the majority floor leader, coauthored the country's first labor code, the Workmen's Compensation Act, led the Mindanao legislative survey that resulted in infrastructure projects, and was the principal author of the Republic Act 1161, otherwise known as the Social Security Act of 1954.

In 1931, he ran and won as senator together with Sergio S. Osmeña Sr. During this time, the country was split into 12 districts with each district represented by 2 senators. He and Osmeña represented Cebu, which was the 10th senatorial district.

By July 10, 1934, he was voted Constitutional Convention delegate that drafted the 1935 Constitution by virtue of the Tydings-McDuffie Law in a group of draftees called “The Seven Wise Men.”

During the Philippine Presidential Election on November 8, 1949, Briones ran for vice-president under the Nacionalista Party. The two candidates lost to their rivals from the Liberal Party: Elpidio Quirino, who was elected president, and Fernando Lopez, who became vice-president. In the 1951 Philippine senate (midterm) election held on November 13, 1951, where 8 senatorial slots were to be voted, he was elected by the entire Philippine electorate and won as senator, no longer voted by district as was in the 1931 elections. He was the only candidate from Visayas who won and served in the Senate until 1953.

== Supreme Court ==
On February 5, 1942, Briones became Court of Appeals Associate Justice and afterwards as the 51st Associate Justice of the Supreme Court by the appointment of Sergio S. Osmeña on September 15, 1945, becoming the first Cebuano to hold such position in the country's judiciary. He served in the Supreme Court until May 24, 1949.

== Final years and legacy ==
Briones died on September 29, 1957.

In 2019, Briones was recognized as one of the Top 100 Cebuano personalities by The Freeman, Cebu's longest-running newspaper. He was recognized alongside Tomas Osmeña, Resil Mojares, Max Surban, and Rubilen Amit as part of the centennial anniversary of the local newspaper. M.C. Briones St. is considered together with Colon Street to be Cebu’s most important downtown avenues.

== Historical commemoration ==
- The Manuel Cabahug Briones Street (popularly known as M.C. Briones) in Mandaue, which forms part of Cebu North Road, is named in his honor.
- The Mandaue City Council passed an ordinance declaring the first Friday of January as Manuel Briones Day.
