= Buenaventura Rodriguez =

Filipino Visayan playwright, legislator, and politician

The Honorable Buenaventura Rodriguez
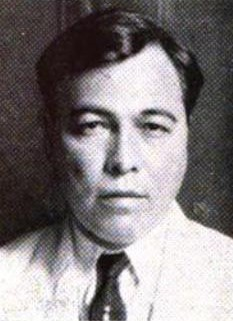

Member of the Philippine House of Representatives from Cebu
- In office June 5, 1934 – December 30, 1938
- Preceded by: Manuel Briones
- Succeeded by: Tereso Dosdos
- Constituency: 7th district
- In office June 2, 1931 – June 5, 1934
- Preceded by: Paulino Ybáñez
- Succeeded by: Roque Desquitado
- Constituency: 1st district

9th Governor of Cebu
- In office 1937–1940
- Preceded by: Sotero B. Cabahug
- Succeeded by: Hilario Abellana

Member of the Cebu Provincial Board
- In office 1921–1931

Personal details
- Born: July 14, 1893 Bogo, Cebu, Captaincy General of the Philippines
- Died: December 9, 1940 (aged 47)
- Relations: Buenaventura Rodriguez; Celestino Rodriguez; Pedro Rodriguez (politician)
- Occupation: Playwright; Politician

Buenaventura Perez Rodriguez (July 14, 1893 – December 9, 1940) was a playwright, the governor of Cebu, Philippines from 1937 until 1940, and a member of the House of Representatives for two terms. He was the first Cebu governor of the Philippine Commonwealth.

== Early life and education ==
The son of Filomeno Rodriguez and Ana Perez, Buenaventura Rodriguez was born in Bogo, Cebu on July 14, 1893 and studied at the Ateneo de Manila University, Colegio de San Carlos, and Escuela de Derecho. The prominent Rodriguez clan was based in Bogo and possessed extensive sugar landholdings in the northern part of Cebu. They traced their lineage and cultural ties to Spain and intermarried with Chinese mestizo families.

== Playwright career ==
Buenaventura was one of the popular playwrights in Cebuano language during the American occupation. Like his contemporaries, his works featured the theme of rising nationalism, combining social criticism and entertainment. The propaganda-laden play Salilang was a story of Rajah Hamabad's daughter and the two rivals competing for her love, one of whom was considered a foreigner and was deemed unfit for the chieftain's daughter's affection.

One other play that he wrote was El Muñeco Roto (The Broken Doll) and on 1915, Compañia de Zarzuela Española performed the play. He wrote zarzuelas including Inday that was staged at the Teatro Oriente on August 18, 1917. Additionally, his play entitled La Adjusta Leja de la Vaguada was adapted into film in 1940. Other notable works include Lili, Balaod sa Kinabuhi (The Laws of Life), Pahiyum (Smile), Dinihan, Bomba Nyor (“Attack, Sir!”), and Dumagsa (“West Wind”).

=== Award ===
For his novel, La Pugna, he was awarded the Premio Zobel (named after Don Enrique Zobel, an advocate of Spanish literature) in 1924.

== Political career ==
Rodriguez was voted as member of the provincial board from 1921 to 1925. Then, he was elected as representative of the 1st district of Cebu in 1931 and served until 1934. Moreover, he won as a member of the House of the Representative in 1934, representing the old 7th legislative district of Cebu encompassing the towns of Asturias, Balamban, Bantayan, Daanbantayan, Madridejos, Medellin, San Remigio, Santa Fe, Tuburan, and Tabuelan.

During the local election of 1937, he ran for governor under the Nacionalista Party against Vicente Sotto, who was campaigning under the newly formed Frente Popular party. On December 14, 1937, he defeated Sotto and was elected governor of Cebu province, becoming the first Cebu governor of the Philippine Commonwealth and to take office in the newly constructed Cebu Provincial Capitol that was inaugurated by then President Manuel L. Quezon on June 14, 1938. He died on December 9, 1940, a day before the election where he was seeking a second term as governor. He was succeeded by Hilario Abellana, who only had hours to conduct an electoral campaign to promote his candidacy.

== Historical commemoration ==
- The B. Rodriguez Street in Cebu City was named after him. It stretches from the corner of V. Rama Avenue to Fuente Rotunda, along the Vicente Sotto Memorial Medical Center.
- His short story/play entitled Mini (The Fake) was part of Dulaang Cebuano (Cebuano Plays) by Erlinda Alburo, Resil Mojares and Don Pagusara published in 1997.
