= Sergio Osmeña =

President of the Philippines from 1944 to 1946

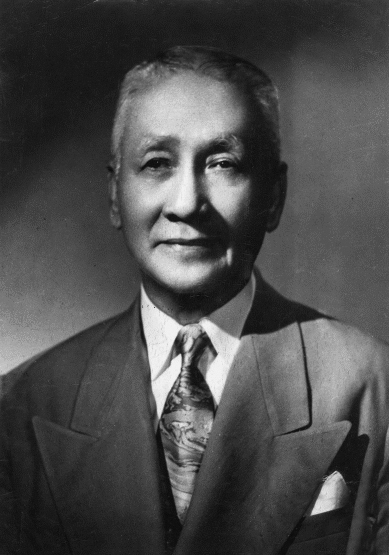
- Photograph of Osmeña

4th President of the Philippines
- In office August 1, 1944 – May 28, 1946 Serving with Jose P. Laurel (1944–1945) (Note: Until 1945, Laurel served as President of the Second Philippine Republic, while Osmeña served as the president of the government in exile.)
- Preceded by: Manuel L. Quezon; Jose P. Laurel (de facto)
- Succeeded by: Manuel Roxas

1st Vice President of the Philippines
- In office November 15, 1935 – August 1, 1944
- President: Manuel L. Quezon
- Preceded by: Position established
- Succeeded by: Elpidio Quirino

2nd Secretary of Public Instruction, Health, and Public Welfare in concurrent capacity as Vice President of the Philippines
- In office December 24, 1941 – August 1, 1944
- President: Manuel L. Quezon
- Preceded by: Juan Nolasco (Note: as Secretary of Public Instruction, Health, and Public Welfare); Jorge Bocobo (Note: as Secretary of Public Instruction)
- Succeeded by: Mariano Eraña (Note: as Secretary of Justice, Labor and Welfare); Basilio Valdes (Note: as Secretary of Health and Public Welfare); Carlos P. Romulo (Note: as Secretary of Public Instruction and Information)

14th Secretary of Public Instruction in concurrent capacity as Vice President of the Philippines
- In office November 15, 1935 – December 1, 1938
- President: Manuel L. Quezon
- Preceded by: Joseph R. Hayden
- Succeeded by: Manuel L. Quezon
Political offices 1904‍–‍1935
Senate President pro tempore of the Philippines
In office October 27, 1922 – August 2, 1933
Preceded by	Espiridion Guanco
Succeeded by	José Clarín
Senator of the Philippines from the 10th district
In office June 6, 1922 – November 15, 1935 Serving with Celestino Rodriguez (1922–1925); Pedro Rodriguez (1925–1931); Manuel Briones (1931–1935)
Preceded by	Filemon Sotto
Succeeded by	Position abolished
1st Speaker of the Philippine House of Representatives Speaker of the Philippine Assembly (1907–1916)
In office October 16, 1907 – March 14, 1922 (Note: Osmeña resigned in December 17, 1921 due to a public campaign against him by Manuel L. Quezon. On December 18, 1921, house representatives approved a resolution expressing confidence on Osmeña's leadership. Despite stepping down, Osmeña remained as house speaker but his political power was given to a steering committee of the House of Representatives.)
Preceded by	Office created
Succeeded by	Manuel Roxas
Member of the Philippine House of Representatives from Cebu's 2nd district Member of the Philippine Assembly (1907–1916)
In office October 16, 1907 – June 6, 1922
Preceded by	Office created
Succeeded by	Vicente Sotto
3rd Governor of Cebu
In office 1904 – October 16, 1907
Preceded by	Juan F. Climaco
Succeeded by	Dionisio A. Jakosalem
Party positions held
1st and 3rd President of the Nacionalista Party
In office 1944–1953
Preceded by	Manuel L. Quezon
Succeeded by	Eulogio Rodriguez
In office 1907–1935
Preceded by	Position established
Succeeded by	Manuel L. Quezon

Personal details
- Born: Sergio Osmeña; September 9, 1878 Cebu, Cebu, Captaincy General of the Philippines, Spanish East Indies
- Died: October 19, 1961 (aged 83) Quezon City, Philippines
- Resting place: Manila North Cemetery, Santa Cruz, Manila, Philippines
- Party: Nacionalista (1907–1961)
- Spouses: Estefania Chiong Veloso (m. 1901; died 1918) Esperanza Limjap (m. 1920)
- Children: 13, including Sergio Jr.
- Education: Colegio de San Juan de Letran (AB); University of Santo Tomas (LL.B)
- Profession: Lawyer, politician

Military service
- Allegiance: First Philippine Republic (Commonwealth of the Philippines) Philippine Commonwealth
- Branch/service: Philippine Revolutionary Army; Philippine Commonwealth Army
- Years of service: 1899–1900; 1941–1944
- Rank: Commander-in-Chief
- Battles/wars: Philippine–American War World War II: Philippines campaign (1941–1942); Japanese occupation of the Philippines; Philippines Campaign (1944–1945)

Chinese name
- Traditional Chinese: 吳文釗
- Simplified Chinese: 吴文钊
Transcriptions
Standard Mandarin
- Hanyu Pinyin: Wú Wénzhāo
Southern Min
- Hokkien POJ: Gô͘ Bûn-chiau
- Sergio Osmeña's voice Recorded November 12, 1943

Sergio Osmeña Sr. CCLH (Spanish: [ˈseɾxjo osˈmeɲa], Tagalog: [ˈsɛɾhjo ʔosˈmɛɲa]; Chinese: 吳文釗; Pe̍h-ōe-jī: Gô͘ Bûn-chiau; September 9, 1878 – October 19, 1961) was a Filipino lawyer and politician who served as the fourth president of the Philippines from 1944 to 1946 and as the first vice president of the Philippines from 1935 to 1944. He served the shortest term as president of the Philippines, lasting for only 1 year and 300 days. He was vice president under Manuel L. Quezon. Upon Quezon's sudden death in 1944, Osmeña succeeded him at age 65, becoming the first vice president to succeed to the Philippine presidency and the oldest person to assume the office until Rodrigo Duterte took office in 2016 at age 71. He was the founder of the Nacionalista Party.

Osmeña was also the first Visayan to become president, and regarded as the "Grand Old Man" of Cebu.

Prior to his accession in 1944, Osmeña served as governor of Cebu from 1906 to 1907, member and first speaker of the Philippine House of Representatives from 1907 to 1922, and senator from the 10th senatorial district for thirteen years, in which capacity he served as Senate president pro tempore. In 1935, he was nominated to be the running-mate of Senate President Manuel L. Quezon for the presidential election that year. The duo were overwhelmingly re-elected in 1941.

He was the patriarch of the prominent Osmeña family, which includes his son, former senator Sergio Osmeña Jr., and his grandsons, former senators Sergio Osmeña III and John Henry Osmeña, former governor Lito Osmeña, and former Cebu City mayor and current Cebu City vice mayor Tomas Osmeña.

== Early life and education ==
Osmeña was born on September 9, 1878, in the then-municipality of Cebu in Cebu. His biological father was Don Antonio Sanson, a socially prominent and wealthy Chinese mestizo businessman and haciendero known for his vast landholdings throughout Cebu. Sanson came from one of Cebu's oldest and most illustrious families. His mother, Juana Osmeña y Suico (1858/1859 – 1941), was reportedly 20 years old at the time. However, since Sanson was already married to another woman, Osmeña was considered illegitimate. As a result, he took on his mother's surname.

Osmeña was secretive of his parentage. He would frequent Sanson's farm in Borbon, suggesting he was aware of the identity of his real father.

The Osmeña family, a rich and prominent clan of Chinese Filipino heritage with vast business interests in Cebu, warmed to him as he established himself as a prominent figure in local society.

Osmeña received his elementary education at the Colegio de San Carlos and graduated in 1892. Osmeña continued his education in Manila, studying in San Juan de Letran College where he first met Manuel L. Quezon, a classmate of his, as well as Vicente Madrigal, Juan Sumulong, and Emilio Jacinto. He took up law at the University of Santo Tomás and placed second in the 1903 bar examinations. He served on the war staff of General Emilio Aguinaldo as a courier and journalist. In 1900, he founded the Cebu newspaper El Nuevo Día (English: 'The New Day'), which operated for three years.

== Public service in Cebu ==
When Cebu Governor Juan Clímaco was sent as a member of the Board of Commissioners of the St. Louis Purchase Expedition, Osmeña was appointed acting governor. When Climaco returned, he was appointed as provincial fiscal. His stint there elevated him in politics when he was elected governor of Cebu in 1906.

== Congressional career ==
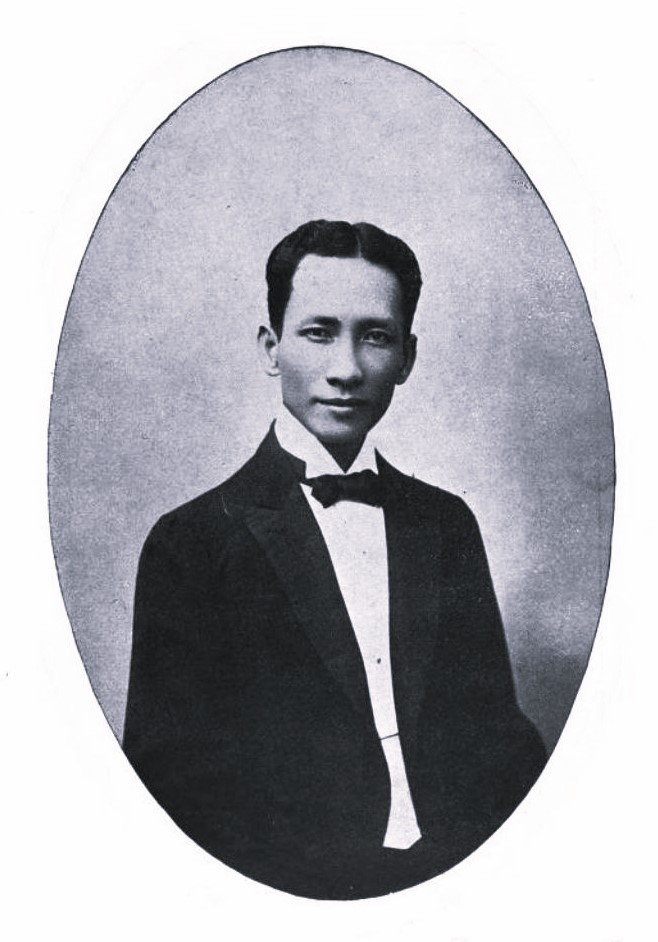
Osmeña as a member of the Philippine Assembly, 1908

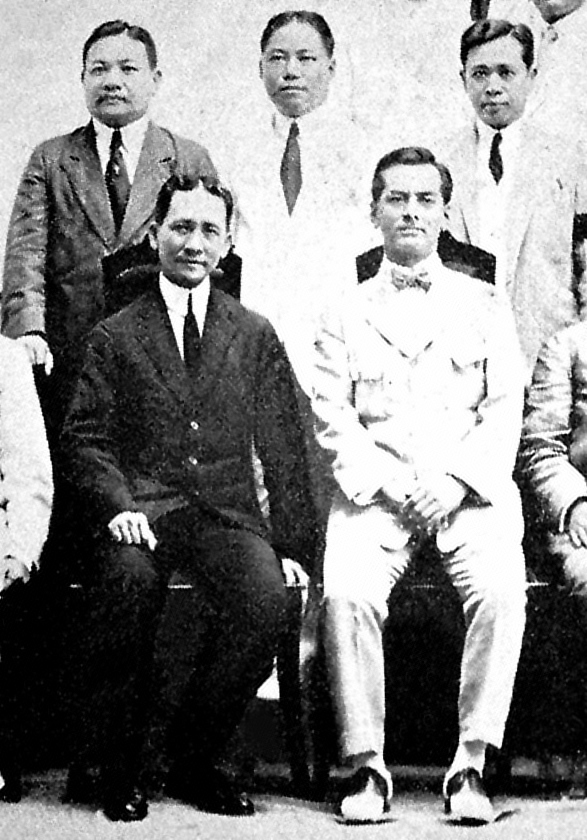
Osmeña (seated, left) and Manuel L. Quezon (seated, right) during their early years

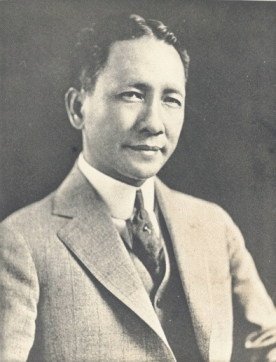
Osmeña as Speaker of the Philippine Assembly

=== House of Representatives ===
While governor, he successfully ran for a seat in the first Philippine Assembly inaugurated in 1907 and was elected as its first speaker. Osmeña was 29 years old and already the highest-ranking Filipino official. He and another provincial politician, Manuel L. Quezon of Tayabas, set up the Nacionalista Party as a foil to the Partido Federalista of Manila-based politicians. During his speakership, members of the assembly sought to initiate policies that constantly clashed with the opinions of American superiors in the Philippine Commission that ultimately did not pass. Three important bills from the assembly were rejected by the Philippine Commission.

1. the repeal of the sedition law which imposed penalties on any Filipino who advocated independence;
2. the repeal of the flag law which banned display of the Filipino flag;
3. the grant of more powers to the local governments.

The Americans' authority did not stop the assembly under him from initiating transformative legislation that would come to pass. These included the creation of a Council of State and a Board of Control that enabled the Philippine legislature to share some of the executive powers of the American governor-general.

During his time as a leader of the Nacionalista Party, Osmeña experienced criticism from fellow Nacionalistas. One notable example was from the newspaper The Independent, launched by Vicente Sotto in 1915, which claimed that he sided with Spain during the Philippine Revolution. His unpopularity as Nacionalista party leader reached its climax during a political crisis in 1922 leading to his sudden resignation. He also withdrew from the speakership and surrendered his political power to a steering committee of the House of Representatives since December 1921. He officially served as house speaker until 1922.

=== Quezon-Osmeña alliance ===
Osmeña was friends and classmates with Manuel L. Quezon, who was the majority floor leader of the Philippine Assembly under Osmeña's speakership. When the Jones Law was passed, Quezon was elected as Senate president and Osmeña remained speaker.

=== Senate ===
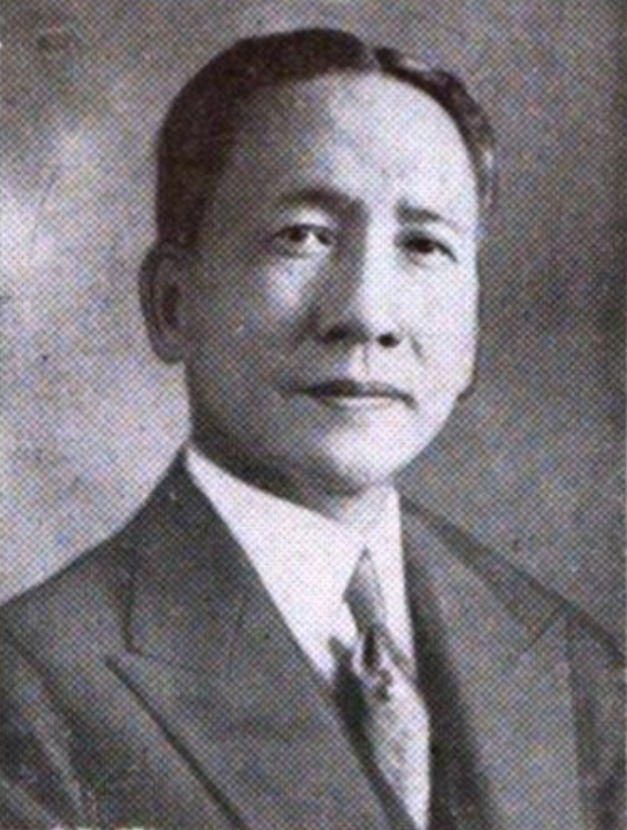
Osmeña as a senator, published by Benipayo Press (c. 1935)

In 1922, Osmeña was elected to the Senate representing the 10th senatorial district. During his time as president pro tempore of the senate, he became acting senate president briefly in 1930 after Senate President Quezon became ill.

He went to the United States as part of the OsRox Mission in 1933, to secure passage of the Hare–Hawes–Cutting Independence Bill, which was superseded by the Tydings–McDuffie Act in March 1934.

==== Rivalry with Quezon ====
Despite being a political ally of Quezon, he had been in controversy with him in 1922, over party principles, and in 1933 concerning the Hare–Hawes–Cutting Bill.

Osmeña supported the controversial Hare–Hawes–Cutting Bill as it provided independence for the Philippines. Quezon, meanwhile, wanted to reject the bill due to certain provisions like the maintenance of US.military bases. After their return from the United States in August 1933, Osmeña, along with Manuel Roxas, campaigned for the ratification of it in the Philippine Legislature. Quezon, on the other hand, campaigned for its rejection.

Due to the HHC Controversy, Osmeña's faction was defeated during the 1934 national elections.

== Vice presidency (1935–1944) ==
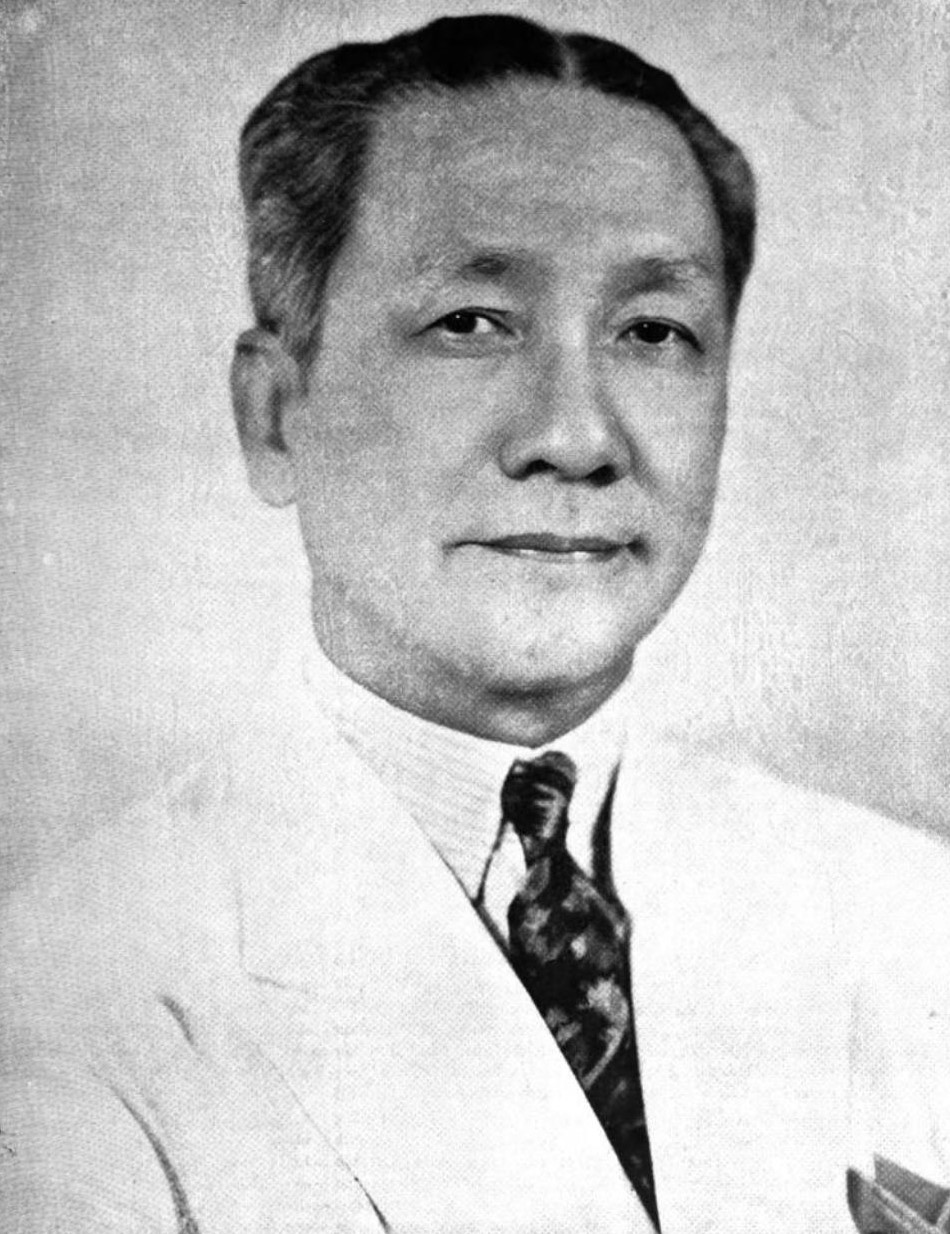
Osmeña as vice president of the Philippines

Osmena was inaugurated vice-president, along with Quezon as president, on November 15, 1935. Quezon had originally been barred by the Philippine constitution from seeking re-election. However, in 1940, constitutional amendments were ratified allowing him to seek re-election for a fresh term ending in 1943. In the 1941 presidential elections, Quezon was re-elected over former Senator Juan Sumulong with nearly 82% of the vote. Re-elected in 1941, Osmeña remained vice president during the Japanese occupation when the government was in exile. As vice-president, Osmeña concurrently served as secretary of public instruction from 1935 to 1940, and again from 1941 to 1944.

The outbreak of World War II and the Japanese invasion resulted in periodic and drastic changes to the government structure. Executive Order 390, December 22, 1941, abolished the Department of the Interior and established a new line of succession. Executive Order 396, December 24, 1941, further reorganized and grouped the cabinet, with the functions of secretary of justice assigned to the chief justice of the Supreme Court.

== Quezon-Osmeña impasse ==
By 1943, the Philippine government-in-exile was faced with a serious crisis. According to the amendments to the 1935 Constitution, Quezon's term as president was to expire on December 30, 1943, and Vice-President Sergio Osmeña would automatically succeed him to serve out the remainder of term until 1945. This eventuality was brought to Quezon's attention by Osmeña himself, who wrote the former to this effect. Aside from replying to this letter informing Osmeña that it would not be wise and prudent to effect any such change under the circumstances, Quezon issued a press release along the same line. Osmeña then requested the opinion of U.S. attorney general Homer Cummings, who upheld Osmeña's view as more in keeping with the law. Quezon, however, remained adamant. He accordingly sought U.S. president Franklin D. Roosevelt's decision. The latter chose to remain aloof from the controversy, suggesting instead that the Philippine officials themselves solve the impasse. A cabinet meeting was then convened by Quezon. Aside from Quezon and Osmeña, others present in this momentous meeting were Resident Commissioner Joaquin Elizalde, Brig. Gen. Carlos P. Romulo, and Cabinet Secretaries Andres Soriano and Jaime Hernandez. Following a spirited discussion, the Cabinet adopted Elizalde's opinion favoring the decision and Quezon announced his plan to retire in California.

After the meeting, however, Osmeña approached Quezon and broached his plan to ask the U.S. Congress to suspend the constitutional provisions for presidential succession until after the Philippines should have been liberated. This legal way out was agreeable to Quezon and the members of his Cabinet. Proper steps were taken to carry out the proposal. Sponsored by Senator Tydings and Congressman Bell, the pertinent Joint Resolution No. 95 was unanimously approved by the Senate on a voice vote and passed the House of Representatives by a vote of 181 to 107 on November 12, 1943.

== Presidency (1944–1946) ==
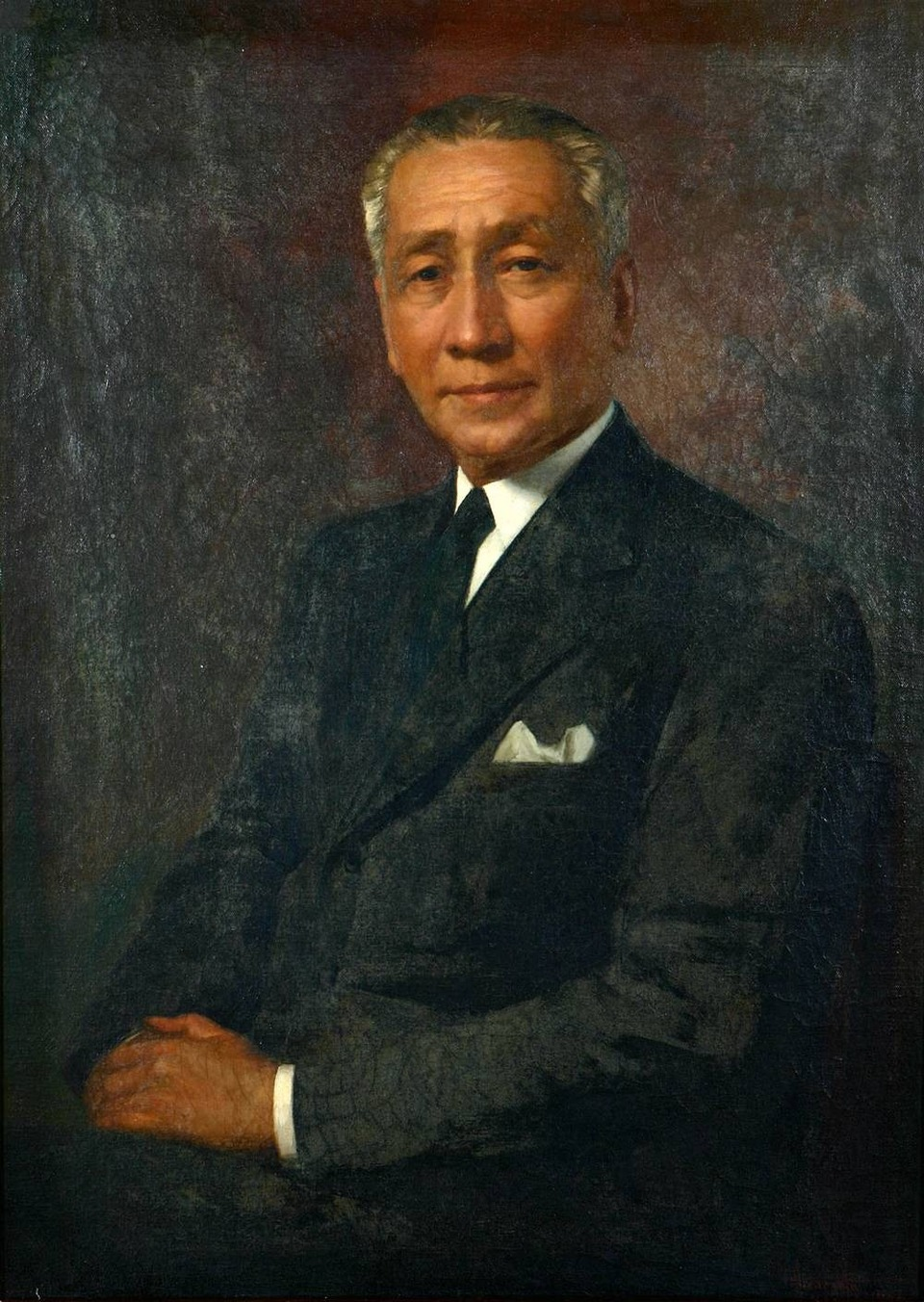
Official Malacañan Portrait by Fernando Amorsolo

Presidential styles of Sergio Osmeña
- Reference style: His Excellency
- Spoken style: Your Excellency
- Alternative style: Mr. President

Osmeña became president of the Commonwealth on Quezon's death in 1944. He was sworn in by Associate Justice Robert H. Jackson in Washington, D.C. on August 1. Osmeña delivered his inaugural speech on August 10.

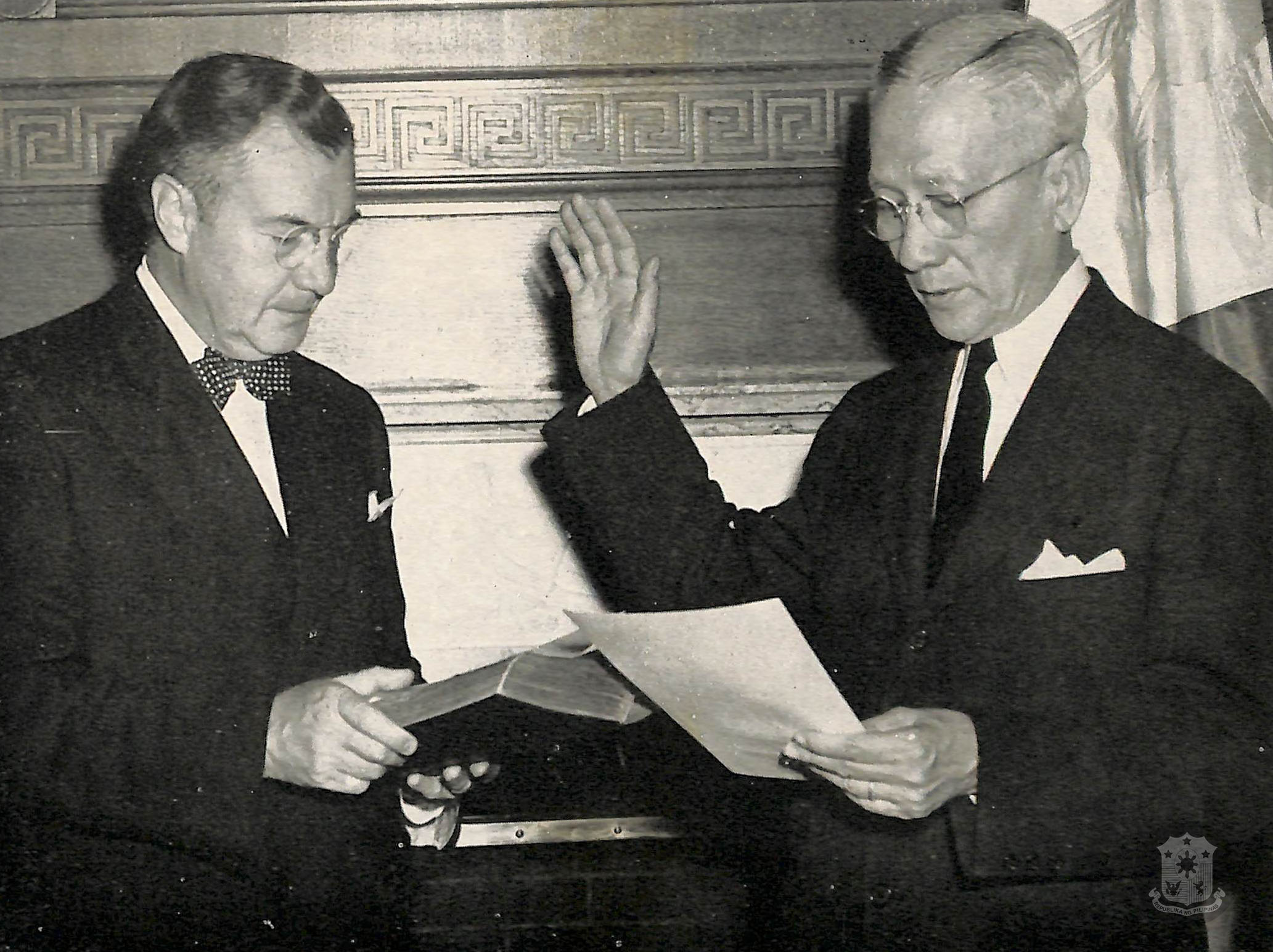
Vice President Osmeña taking the oath of office to become the fourth president of the Philippines and the second president of the Philippine Commonwealth after the passing of Manuel L. Quezon

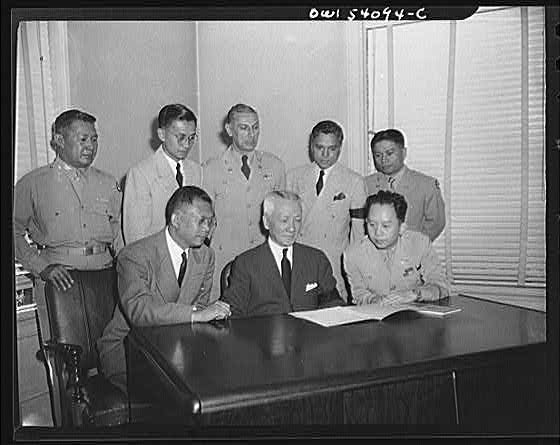
President Osmeña (seated, center) with members of his cabinet, circa 1944

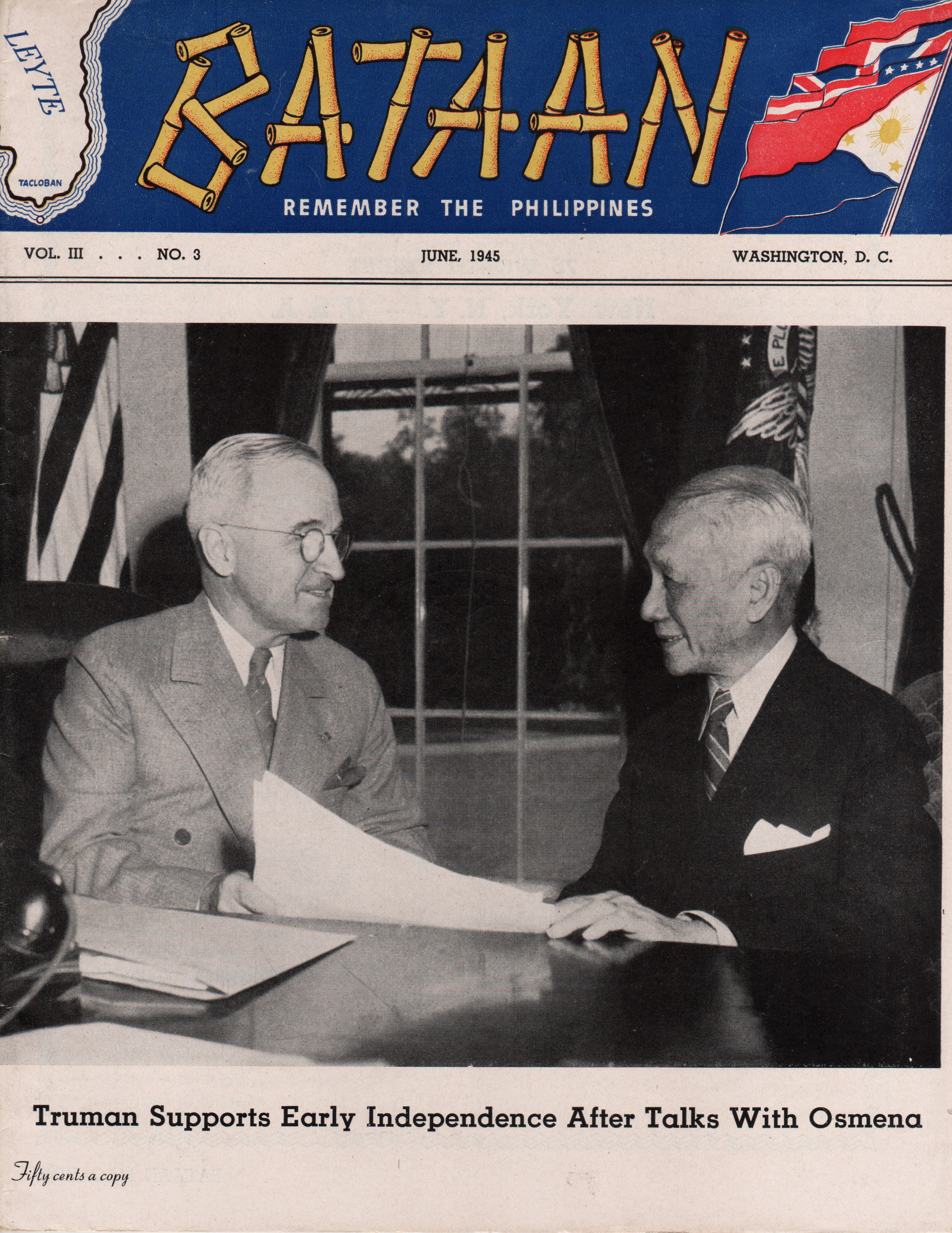
President Osmeña (right) with U.S. President Harry S. Truman in the cover of the Bataan Magazine, June 1945.

=== Liberation ===
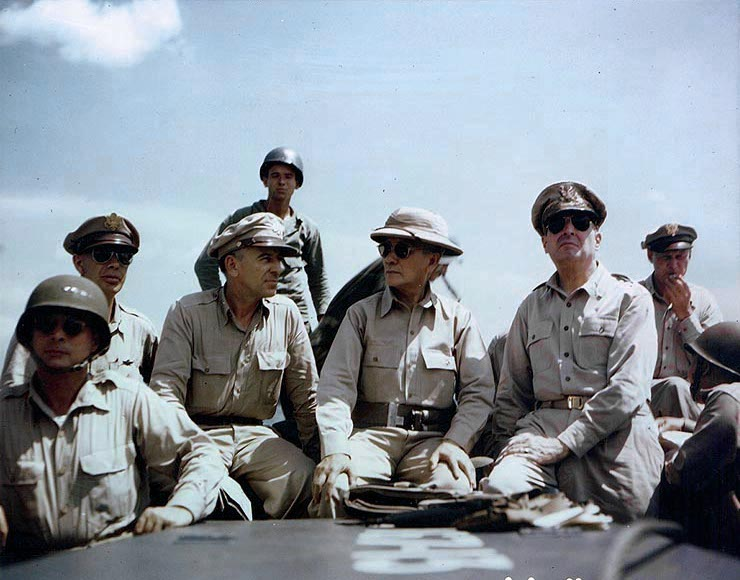
Off Leyte, October 1944 Left to right: Lieutenant General George Kenney, Lieutenant General Richard K. Sutherland, President Sergio Osmeña, General Douglas MacArthur.

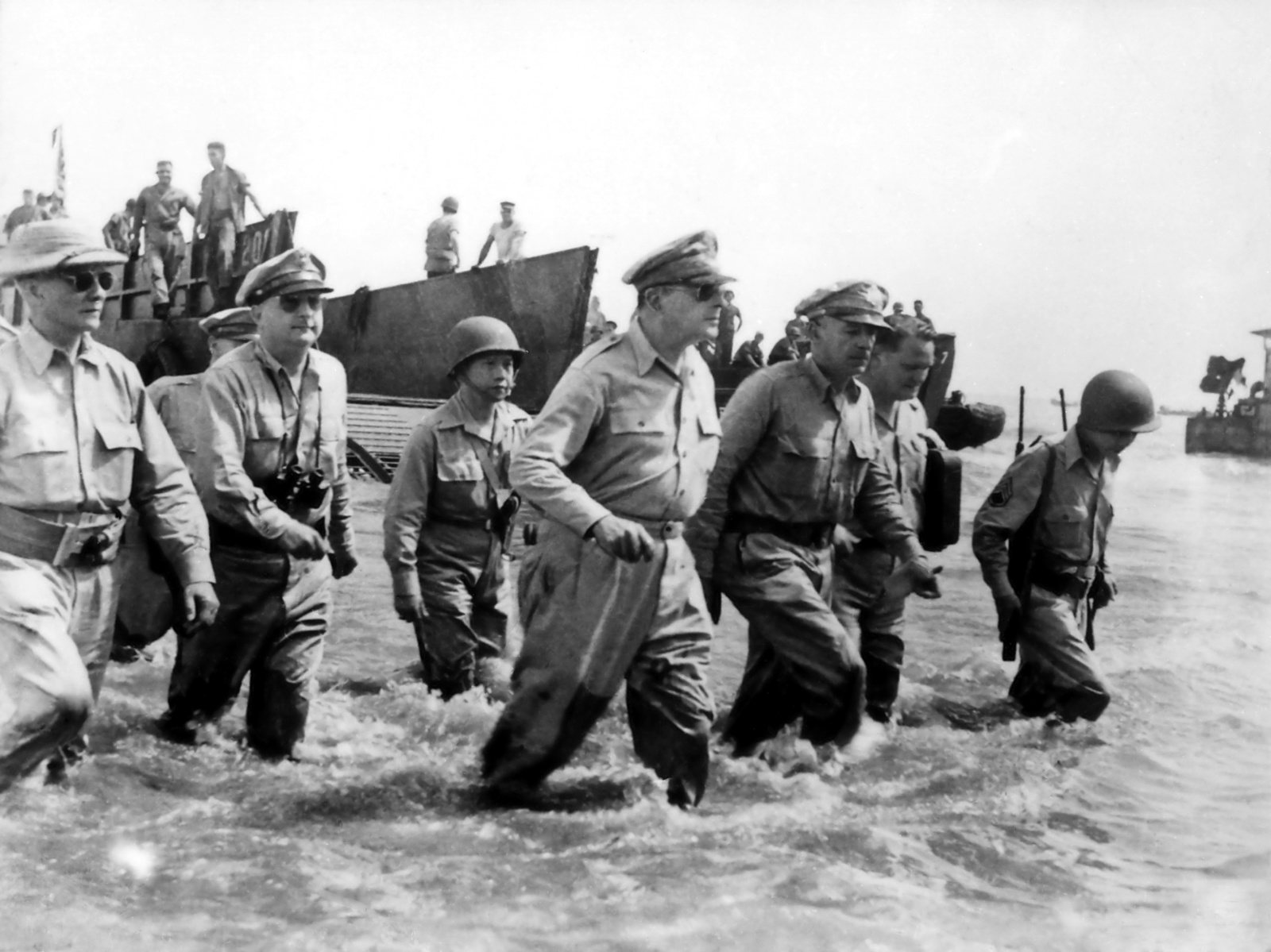
President Sergio Osmeña together with General Douglas MacArthur during the historic landing at Leyte in 1944.

Osmeña accompanied U.S. General Douglas MacArthur during the landing of U.S. forces in Leyte on October 20, 1944, starting the liberation of the Philippines during the Second World War. Upon establishing the beachhead, MacArthur immediately transferred authority to Osmeña, the successor of Manuel Quezon, as Philippine Commonwealth president.

=== Domestic policies ===
==== Restoration of the Commonwealth ====
With Manila liberated, General of the Army, Douglas MacArthur, on behalf of the United States, turned over the reins of government of the Philippines to Commonwealth president Sergio Osmeña, on February 27, 1945, amidst brief, but impressive, ceremonies held at the Malacañang Palace. Osmeña, after thanking the United States through General MacArthur, announced the restoration of the Government of the Commonwealth of the Philippines and worked out the salvation of the Philippines from the ravages of war.

==== Government reorganization ====
Osmeña proceeded with the immediate reorganization of the government and its diverse dependencies. On April 8, 1945, he formed his Cabinet, administering the oath of office to its component members. Later, Osmeña received the Council of State to help him solve the major problems confronting the nation. Government offices and bureaus were gradually reestablished. A number of new ones were created to meet needs then current. Also restored were the Supreme Court of the Philippines and the lower courts. The Court of Appeals was abolished, and its appellate jurisdiction was transferred to the Supreme Court, the members of which were increased to eleven – one chief justice and ten associate justices – in order to attend to the new responsibilities. Slowly but steadily, as the liberating forces freed the other portions of the country, provincial and municipal governments were established by the Commonwealth to take over from the military authorities.

==== Rehabilitation of the Philippine National Bank ====
Following the restoration of the Commonwealth government, Congress was reorganized. Manuel Roxas and Elpidio Quirino were elected as Senate president and Senate president pro tempore, respectively. In the House of Representatives, Jose Zulueta of Iloilo was elected as speaker and Prospero Sanidad as Speaker pro tempore. The opening session of the Congress was personally addressed by Osmeña, who reported on the Commonwealth government-in-exile and proposed vital pieces of legislation.

The first Commonwealth Congress earnestly took up the various pending assignments to solve the pressing matters affecting the Philippines, especially in regard to relief, rehabilitation, and reconstruction. The first bill enacted was Commonwealth Act No. 672 – rehabilitating the Philippine National Bank.

==== People's court ====
Yielding to American pressure, on September 25, 1945, the Congress enacted Commonwealth Act No. 682 creating the People's Court and the Office of Special Prosecutors to deal with the pending cases of "collaboration".

=== Foreign policies ===
==== United Nations Charter ====
Osmeña sent the Philippine delegation, which was headed by Carlos P. Romulo, to the San Francisco gathering for the promulgation of the Charter of the United Nations on June 26, 1945. Other members of the delegation were Maximo Kalaw, Carlos P. Garcia, Pedro Lopez, Francisco Delegado, Urbano Zafra, Alejandro Melchor, and Vicente Sinco. The 28th signatory nation of the United Nations, the Philippines was one of the fifty-one nations that drafted the UN Charter. Once approved by the Philippine delegation, the UN Charter was ratified by the Congress of the Philippines and deposited with the U.S. State Department on October 11, 1945.

==== Foreign Relations Office ====
To prepare for the forthcoming independent status of the Philippines, Osmeña created the Office of Foreign Relations. Vicente Sinco was appointed as its first commissioner, with cabinet rank. In this connection, Osmeña also entered into an agreement with the United States government to send five Filipino trainees to the U.S. State Department to prepare themselves for diplomatic service. They were sent by U.S. State Department to the United States embassies in Moscow and Mexico City and consulates in Saigon and Singapore.

==== International banking ====
On December 5, 1945, Osmeña appointed Resident Commissioner Carlos P. Romulo as his representative to accept Philippine membership in the International Monetary Fund and in the International Bank for Reconstruction and Development, which bodies had been conceived in the Bretton Woods Agreement, in which the Philippine had also taken part. Romulo signed said membership on December 27, 1945, on behalf of the Philippines.

==== Bell Trade Act ====
On April 30, 1946, the United States Congress, at last, approved the Bell Act, which as early as January 20 had been reported to the Ways and Means Committee of the lower house, having been already passed by the Senate. Osmeña and Resident Commissioner Romulo had urged the passage of this bill, with United States High Commissioner, Paul V. McNutt, exerting similar pressure.

The Act gave the Philippines eight years of free trade with the United States, then twenty years during which tariffs would be upped gradually until they were in line with the rest of the American tariff policy. The law also fixed some quotas for certain products: sugar – 850,000 long tons (860,000 t); cordage – 6,000,000 pounds (2,700,000 kg); coconut oil – 200,000 long tons (200,000 t); cigars – 200,000,000 pounds (91,000,000 kg). This aid was coupled with that to be obtained from the recently passed Tydings Damage bill, which provided some nine hundred million dollars for payment of war damages, of which one million was earmarked to compensate for church losses. The sum of two hundred and forty million dollars was to be periodically allocated by the United States president as good will. Also, sixty million pieces of surplus property were transferred to the Philippines government.

=== 1946 presidential election ===
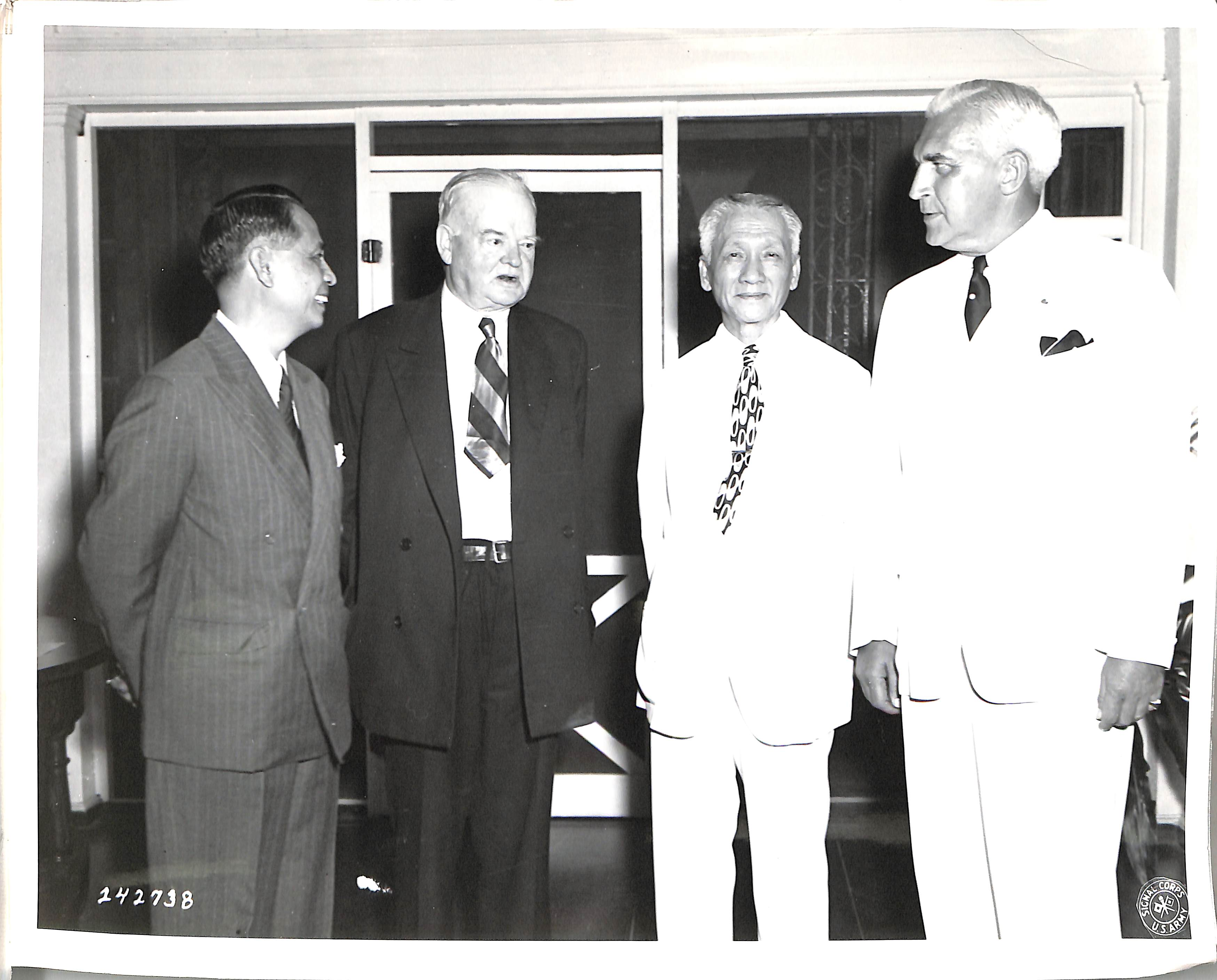
President Osmeña (second from right) with his presidential election rival Manuel Roxas (leftmost) during a tour of Former President Herbert Hoover, April 1946.

Soon after the reconstitution of the Commonwealth government in 1945, Senators Manuel Roxas, Elpidio Quirino and their allies called for an early national election to choose the president and vice president of the Philippines and members of the Congress. In December 1945, the House Insular Affairs of the United States Congress approved the joint resolution setting the date of the election on no later than April 30, 1946.

Prompted by this congressional action, Osmeña called the Philippine Congress to a three-day special session. Congress enacted Commonwealth Act No. 725, setting the date of the election on April 23, 1946. The act was signed by Osmeña on January 5, 1946.

Three parties presented their respective candidates for the different national elective positions. These were the Nacionalista Party – Conservative (Osmeña) wing, the Liberal wing of the Nacionalista Party and the Partido Modernista. The Nacionalistas had Osmeña and Senator Eulogio Rodriguez as their candidates for president and vice president, respectively. The Modernistas chose Hilario Moncado and Luis Salvador for the same positions. The standard bearers of the Liberals were Senators Manuel Roxas and Elpidio Quirino. On January 3, 1946, Osmeña announced his re-election bid. On January 22, 1946, Eulogio Rodriguez was nominated as Osmeña's running mate for vice president, in a convention held at Ciro's Club in Manila. According to the Manila Chronicle:

The convention opened at 10:15 a.m. when the acting secretary of the party, Vicente Farmoso, called the confab to order. Congressman José C. Romero [sic], who delivered the keynote speech accused Senate President Manuel Roxas and his followers "of fanning the flames of discontent among the people, of capitalizing on the people's hardship, and of minimizing the accomplishment of the [Osmeña] Administration. These men with the Messiah complex have been the bane of the country and of the world. This is the mentality that produces Hitlers and the Mussolinis, and their desire to climb to power. They even want to destroy the party which placed them where they are today."

Senator Carlos P. Garcia, who delivered the nomination speech for President Sergio Osmeña, made a long recital of Osmeña's achievements, his virtues as public official and as private citizen.

Entering the convention hall at about 7:30 p.m., President Osmeña, accompanied by the committee on notification, was greeted with rounds of cheer and applause as he ascended the platform. President Osmeña delivered his speech which was a general outline of his future plans once elected. He emphasized that as far as his party is concerned, independence is a close issue. It is definitely coming on 4 July 1946.

On January 19, 1946, Senator Roxas announced his candidacy for president in a convention held in Santa Ana Cabaret in Makati, Rizal. According to the Manila Chronicle:

...more than three thousand (by conservative estimate there were only 1,000 plus) delegates, party members and hero worshipers jammed into suburban, well known Santa Ana Cabaret (biggest in the world) to acclaim ex-katipunero and Bagong Katipunan organizer Manuel Acuña Roxas as the guidon bearer of the Nacionalista Party's Liberal Wing. The delegates, who came from all over the Islands, met in formal convention from 10:50 am and did not break up till about 5:30 pm.

They elected 1. Mariano J. Cuenco, professional Osmeñaphobe, as temporary chairman; 2. José Avelino and ex-pharmacist Antonio Zacarias permanent chairman and secretary, respectively; 3. nominated forty-four candidates for senators; 4. heard the generalissimo himself deliver an oratorical masterpiece consisting of 50 per cent attacks against the (Osmeña) Administration, 50 per cent promises, pledges. Rabid Roxasites greeted the Roxas acceptance speech with hysterical applause.

Osmeña tried to prevent the split in the Nacionalista Party by offering Senator Roxas the position of Philippine Regent Commissioner to the United States but Roxas turned down the offer. A new political organization was born, the Liberal wing of the Nacionalista Party, which would later become the Liberal Party.

A total of 2,218,847 voters went to the polls to elect a president and vice president, who were to be the Commonwealth's last and the Republic's first. Four days after election day, the Liberal Party candidates were proclaimed victors. Roxas registered an overwhelming majority of votes in 34 provinces and nine cities.

== Post-presidency and death (1946–1961) ==
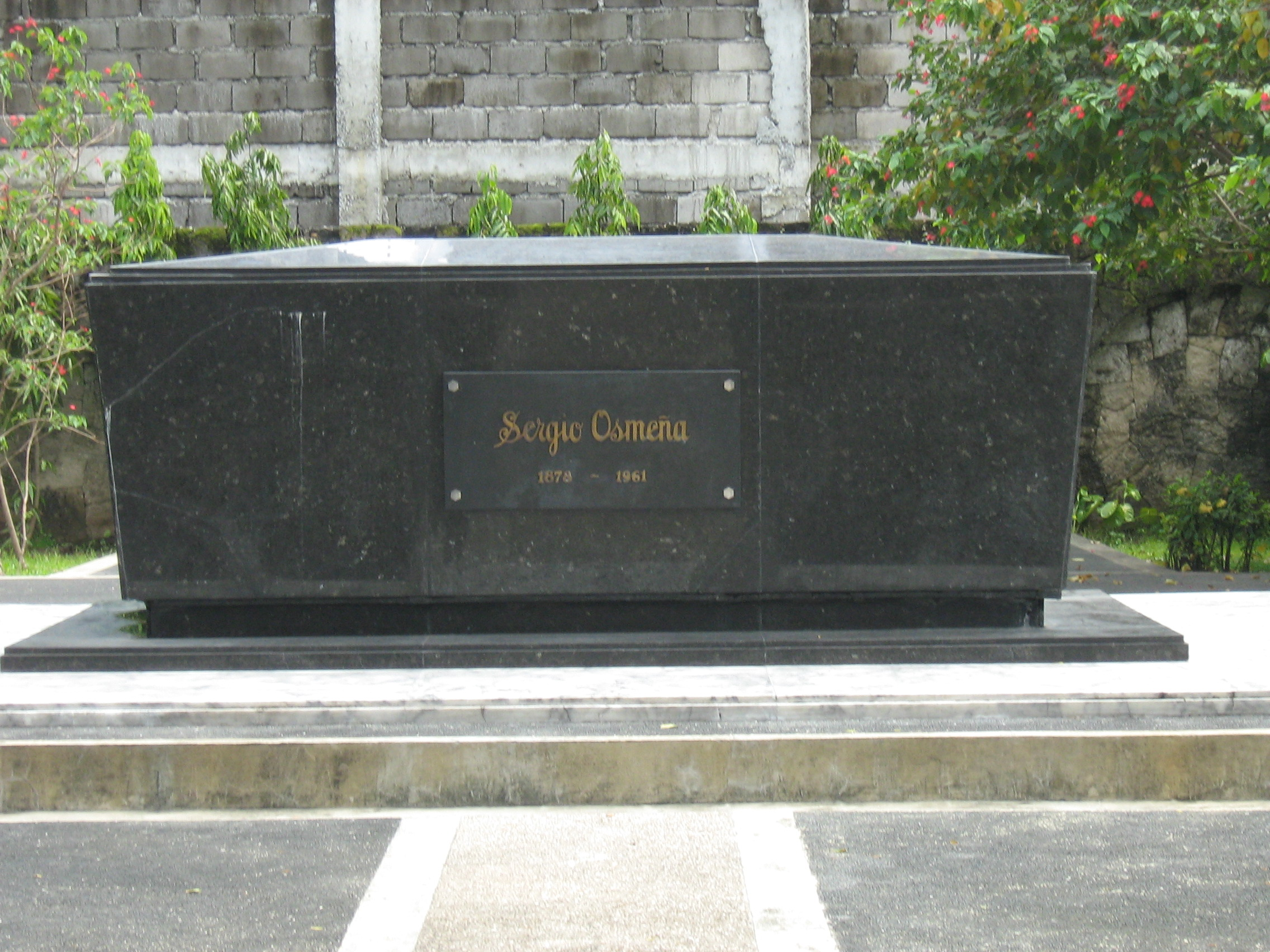
Tomb of Sergio Osmeña

After his electoral defeat, Osmeña retired to his home in Cebu City. He died of pulmonary edema at age 83 on October 19, 1961, at the Veterans Memorial Medical Center in Quezon City. President Carlos P. Garcia declared October 20 to November 3 as "period of national mourning," wherein all flags in the country were flown at half-mast as a sign of mourning.

Osmeña was accorded a state funeral. On October 20, 1961, his remains were laid in state at Malate Church in Manila before being transferred to Malacañang. On October 22, these were transported to Cebu City to lie in state at the Cebu Metropolitan Cathedral and, on the next day, at the Cebu Provincial Capitol. These were then returned to Manila to lie in state at Malacañang once again from October 24 to 25, followed by a necrological service for Osmeña at the Legislative Building until October 26. His remains were buried at Manila North Cemetery at noon of October 26.

== 2023 paternity test ==
For almost a century, the father of Sergio Osmeña had not been certain. Historical records have suggested that either Chinese immigrant and businessman Pedro Lee Gotiaoco or another businessman Antonio Sanson could have been the former president's father. In 2023, Osmeña's descendants Maria Lourdes Bernardo and Annabelle Osmeña-Aboitiz launched a paternity project to determine the father of their ancestor. Y-DNA testing was conducted and in June 2023, Sanson was determined to be Sergio Osmeña's biological father.

In a 2023 article, the genealogist and genetic genealogy specialist who was engaged by Osmeña's descendants, Todd Lucero Sales, recounted how, after exhaustive archival research failed to produce definitive evidence, his team found a 100% match across 23 Y‑DNA markers between Osmeña and the Sanson lineage, while excluding Gotiaoco. He claimed that these results provided a 99.982% probability of a patrilineal connection, thus conclusively identifying Antonio Sanson as Osmeña’s father.

== Personal life ==
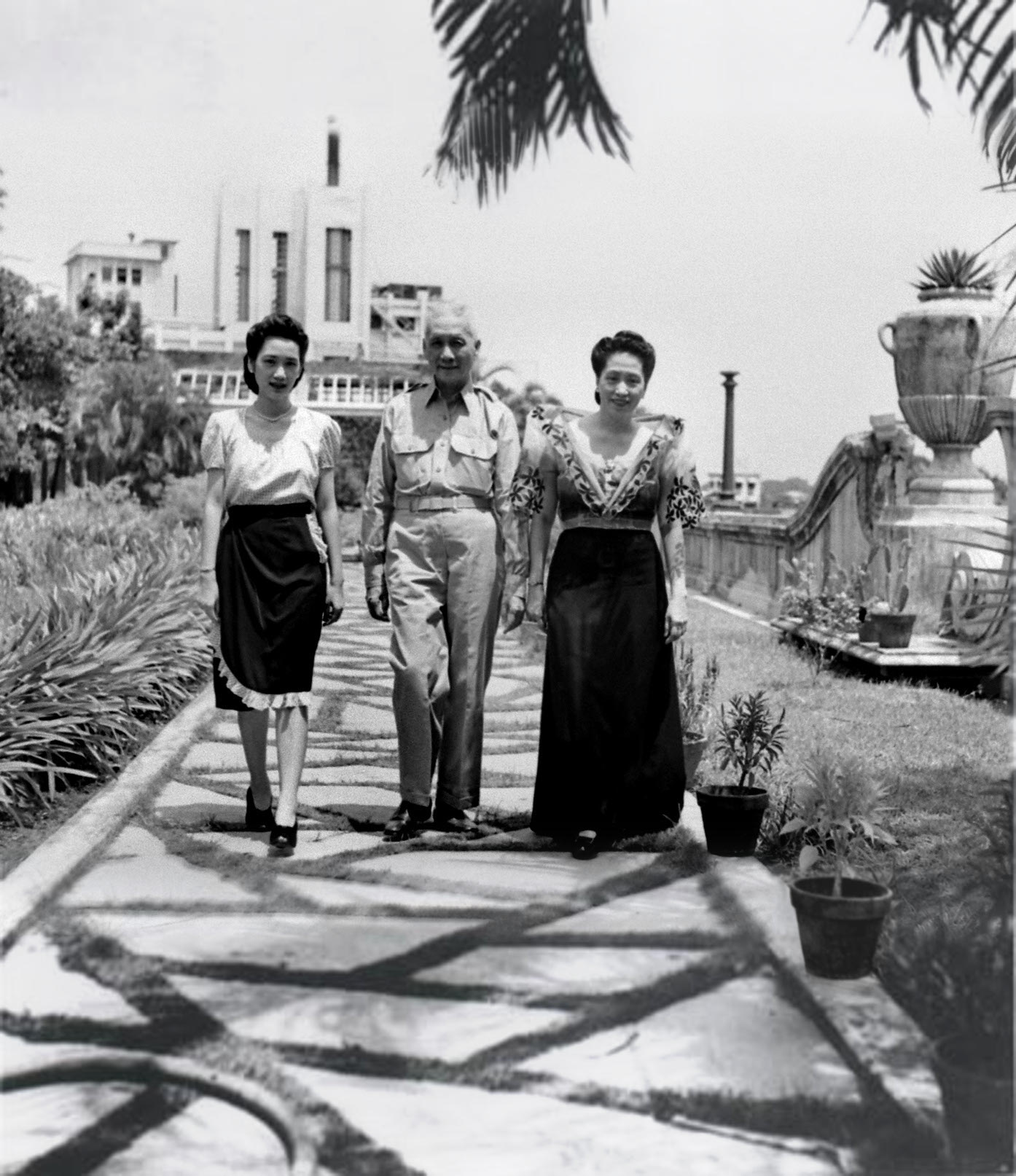
President Osmeña and his family strolling in the Malacañang Palace gardens in 1945.

=== Family ===
- On April 10, 1901, he married Estefania Chiong Veloso, and the couple had ten children: Nicasio, Vicenta, Edilberto, Milagros, Emilio, María Paloma, Jesús, Teodoro, José, and Sergio Jr.
- In January 1920, two years after the death of his first wife, Osmeña married Esperanza Limjap. They had three children, namely, Ramón, Rosalina and Victor.

=== Descendants ===
Several of Osmeña's descendants became prominent political, business and society figures in their own right:

- Sergio Osmeña Jr., son and former Senator
- Sergio Osmeña III, grandson and former Senator
- John Henry Osmeña, grandson, former congressman, former Senator, and former mayor of Toledo, Cebu
- Tomas Osmeña, grandson, incumbent vice mayor of Cebu City
- Lito Osmeña, grandson and former governor of Cebu
- Rogelio Veloso Osmeña, grandson and former Councilor of Cebu City
- Renato Veloso Osmeña, grandson and former vice mayor of Cebu City
- Annabelle Osmeña-Aboitiz - real estate developer
- Maria Victoria "Minnie" Osmeña, daughter of Sergio Osmeña, Jr.

== Commemoration ==
- Osmeña was featured in several stamps through the years, including that commemorating his centenary (pictured) in 1978.
- In 1967, Osmeña replaced the portrait of General Antonio Luna in the Philippine fifty-peso note.

== In popular culture ==
An uncredited actor portrayed Osmeña during the beach landing scene in the Hollywood biographical film MacArthur (1977 film). Audie Gemora portrayed Osmeña in the 2018 film, Quezon's Game. Romnick Sarmenta portrayed Osmeña in the 2025 biopic, Quezon.

== Gallery ==
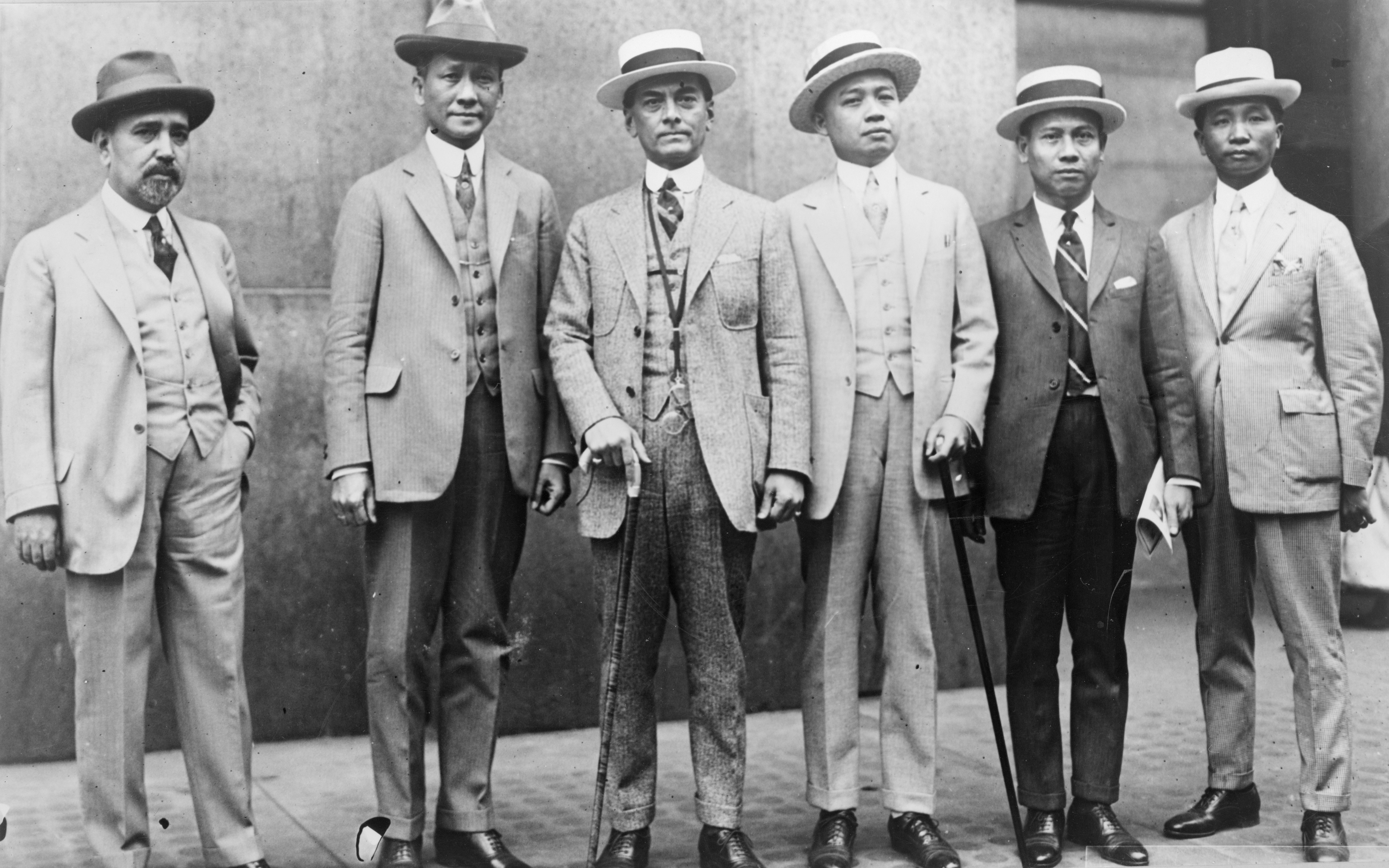
Osmeña with representatives from the Philippine Independence Mission (1924)

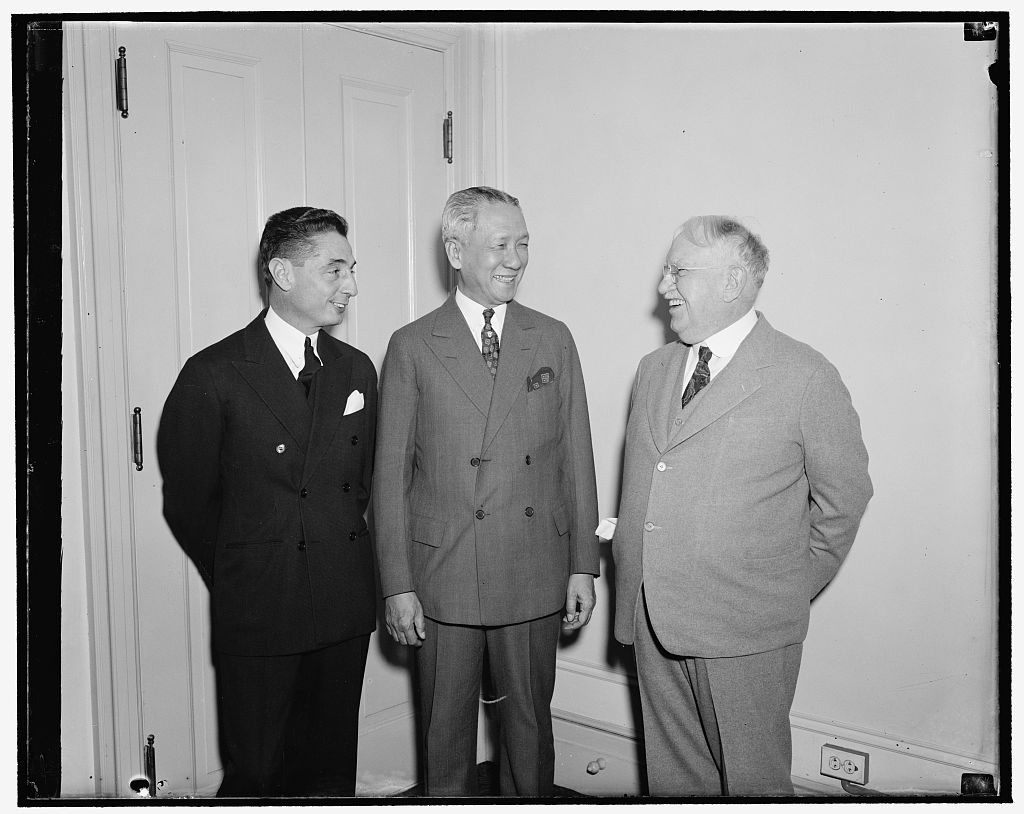
Vice President Osmeña in Washington (1938)

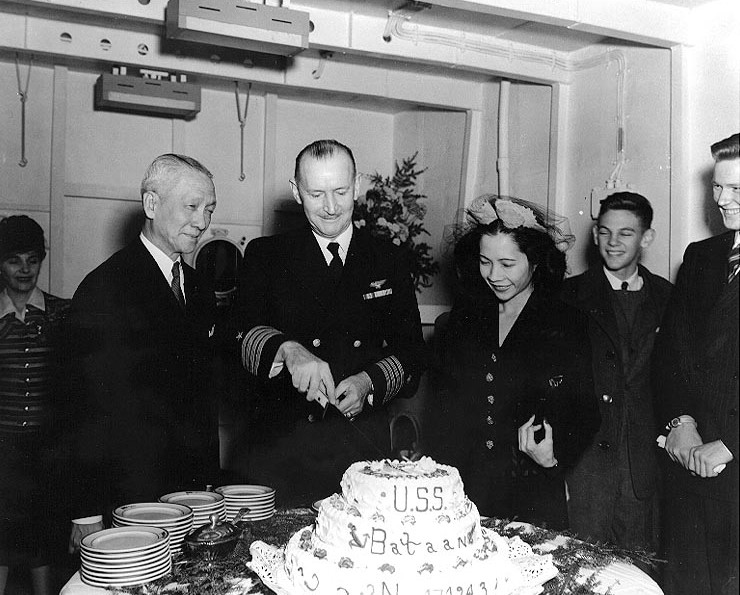
Vice President Osmeña during the commissioning ceremony of USS Bataan (CVL-29) in 1943

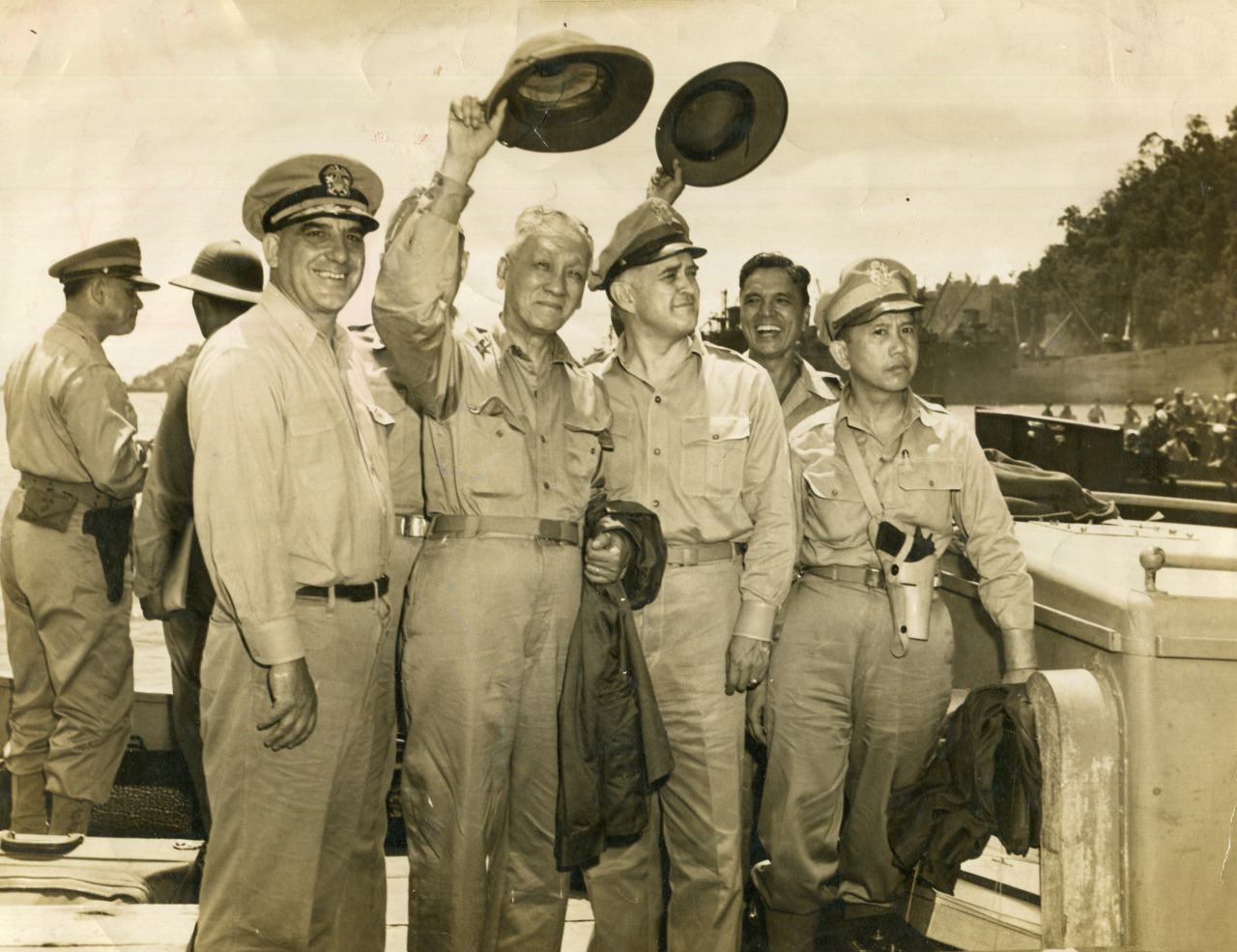
US Navy officers with President Osmeña and Carlos P. Romulo

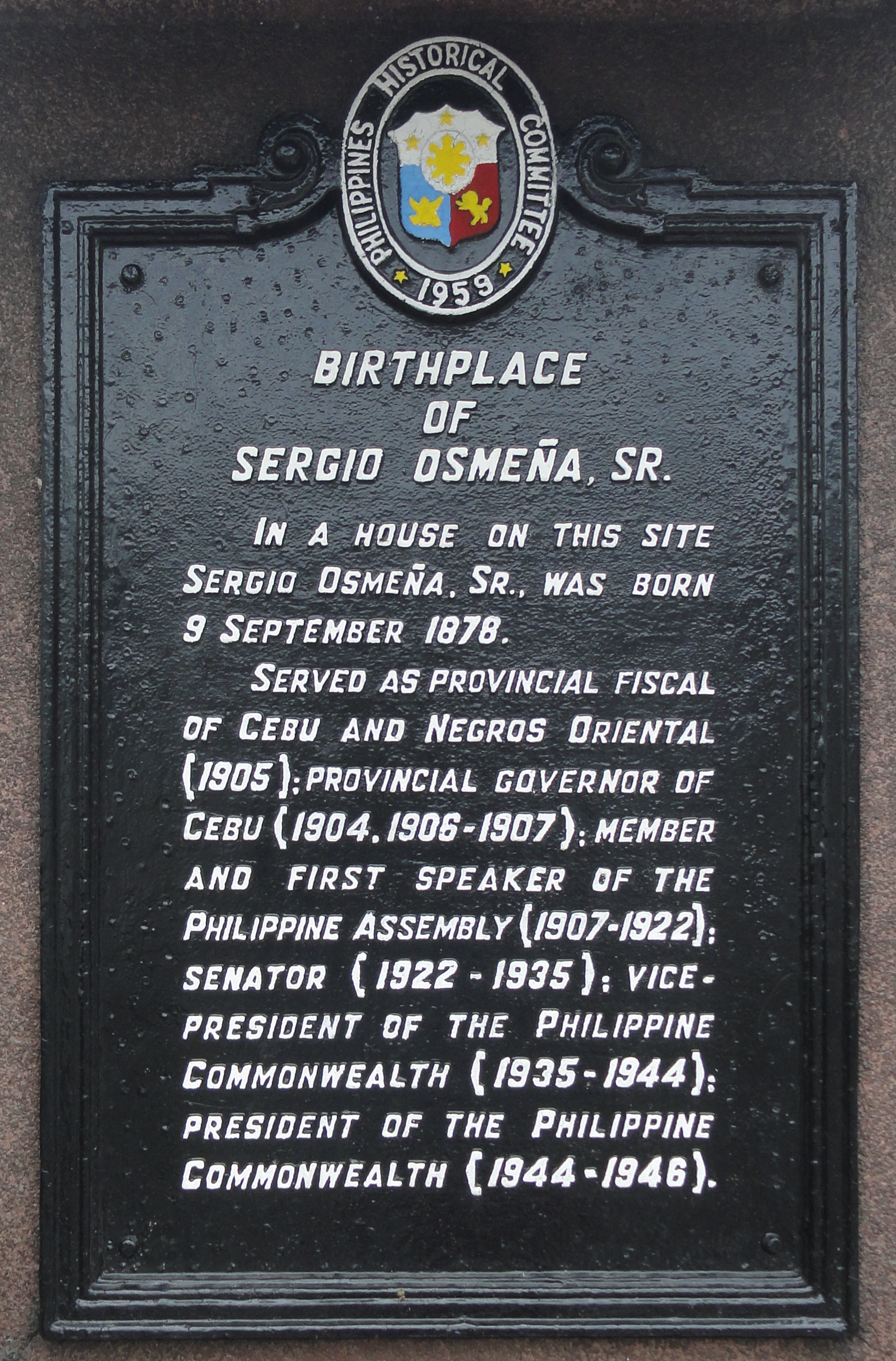
NHCP historical marker commemorating the Birthplace of Sergio Osmeña, Sr.

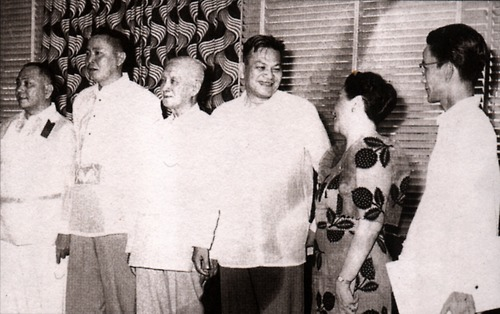
Ramon Magasaysay together with Sergio Osmeña and Serging Osmeña

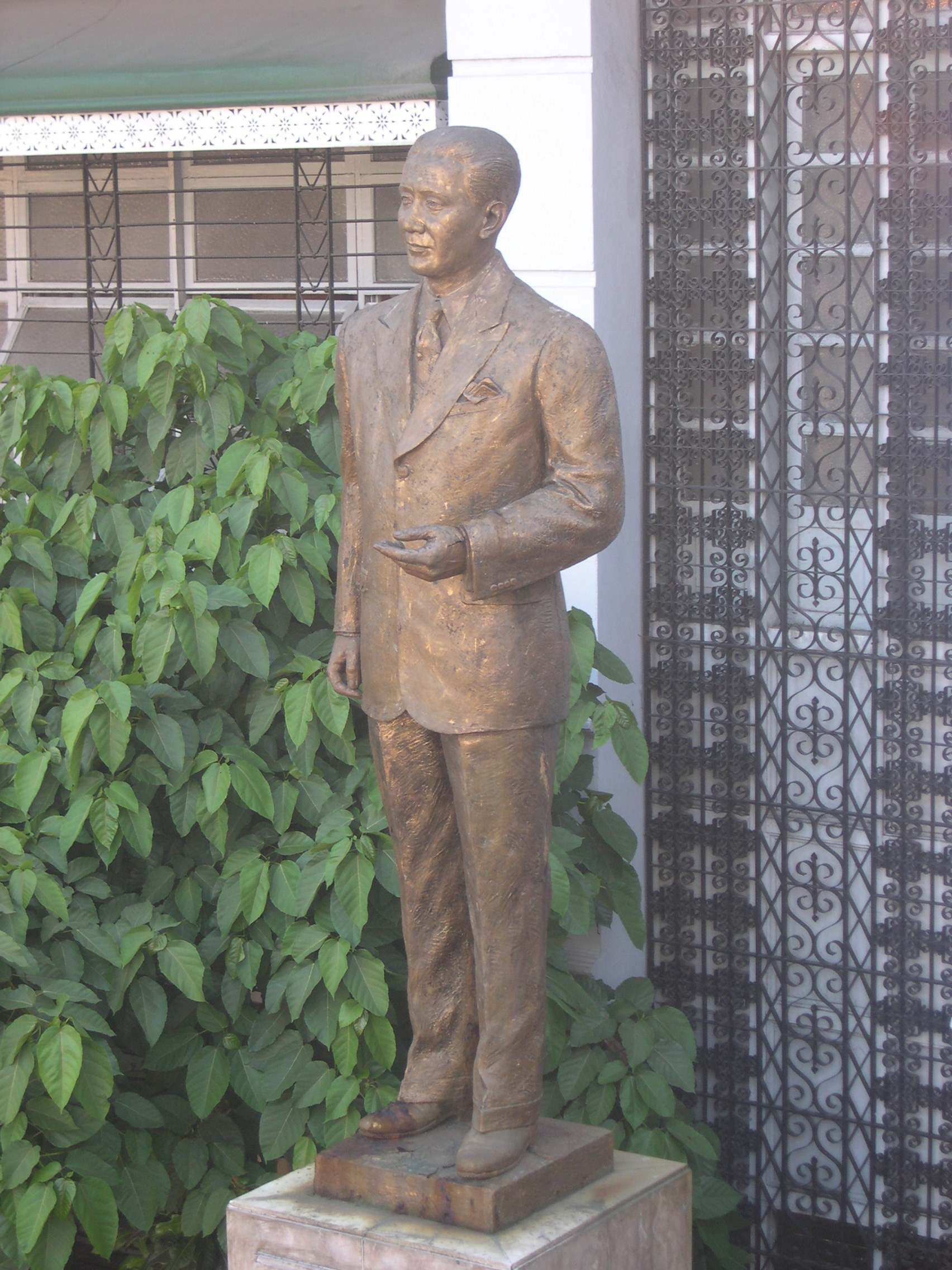
Osmeña's statue inside the CAP Development Center in Cebu City.

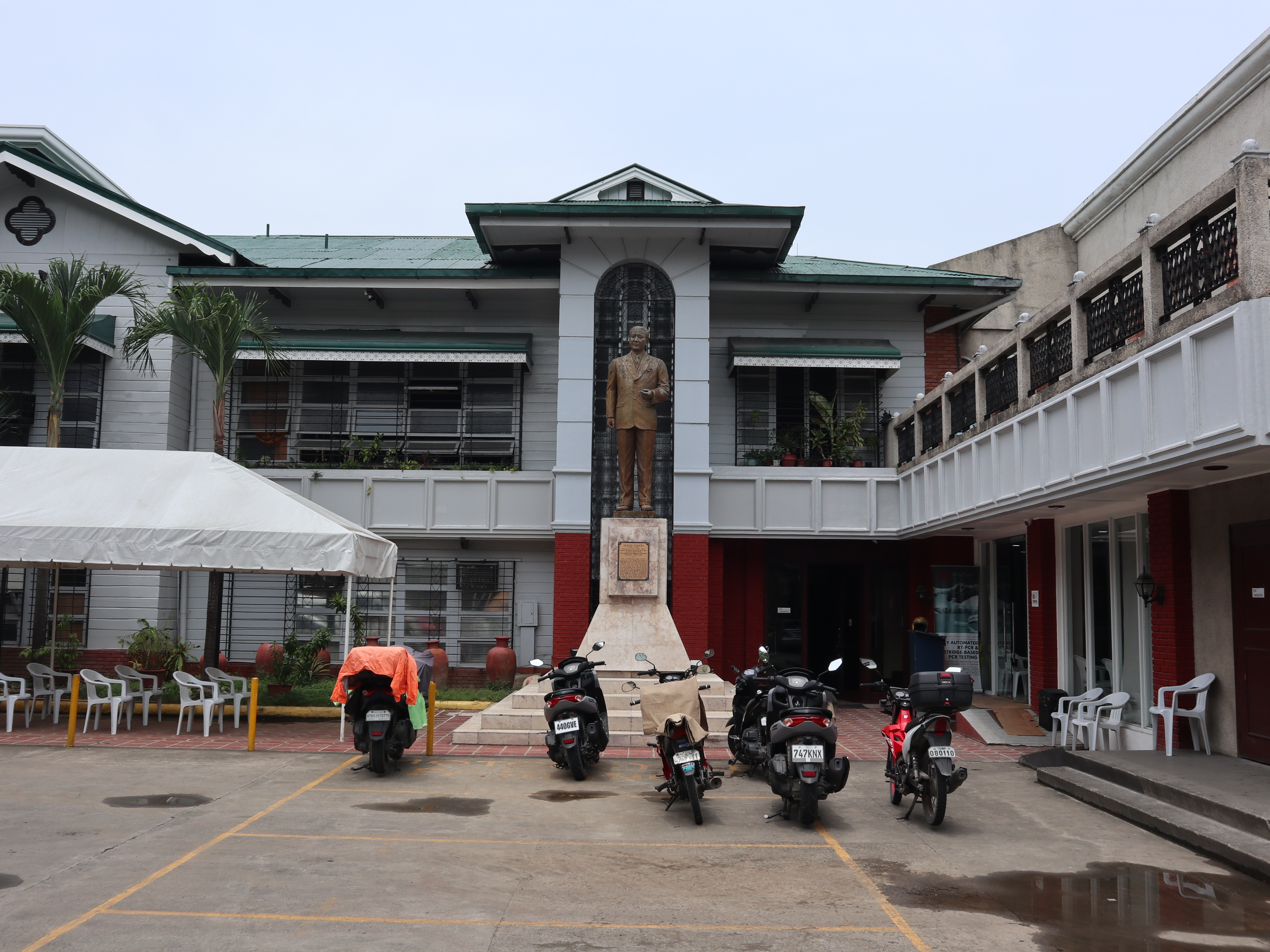
Sergio Osmeña House (Now owned by CAP Development Center) in 2022

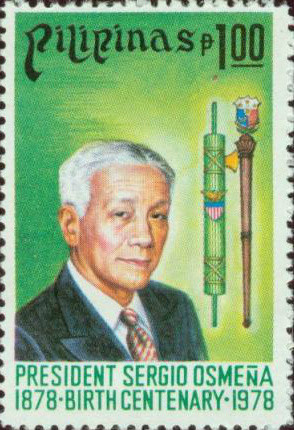
Stamp for Osmeña's Birth Centenary No. 1359, issued in September 1978.

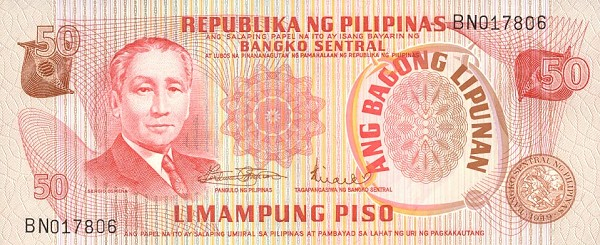
Obverse of the 50-Philippine peso Ang Bagong Lipunan series banknote featuring Osmeña.

== Notes ==
Party political offices
New political party	President of the Nacionalista Party; 1907–1935	Succeeded by Manuel L. Quezon
First	Nacionalista Party nominee for Vice President of the Philippines; 1935, 1941	Succeeded by Eulogio Rodriguez
Preceded by Manuel L. Quezon	President of the Nacionalista Party; 1944–1953	Succeeded by Eulogio Rodriguez
Preceded by Manuel L. Quezon	Nacionalista Party nominee for President of the Philippines; 1946	Succeeded by José P. Laurel
House of Representatives of the Philippines
New seat	Member of the Philippine House of Representatives from Cebu's 2nd district 1907–1922	Succeeded by Vicente Sotto
New office	Speaker of the Assembly; 1907–1916	Succeeded by Himself as Speaker of the House of Representatives
Preceded by Himself as Speaker of the Assembly	Speaker of the House of Representatives; 1916–1922	Succeeded by Manuel Roxas
Senate of the Philippines
Preceded by Filemon Sotto	Senator from the 10th district 1922–1935; With: Celestino Rodriguez (1922–1925); Pedro Rodriguez (1925–1931); Manuel C. Briones (1931–1935)	Position abolished
Preceded by Esperidion Guanco	President pro tempore of the Senate; 1922–1933	Succeeded by José Clarín
Political offices
Preceded by Juan Climaco	Governor of Cebu; 1904–1907	Succeeded by Dionisio Jakosalem
Unknown Last known title holder: Fred Atkinson as General Superintendent	Secretary of Public Instruction; 1935–1939	Succeeded by Jorge Bocobo
Preceded by Juan Nolasco as Secretary of Public Instruction, Health, and Public Welfare	Secretary of Public Instruction, Health, and Public Welfare; 1941–1944	Succeeded by Mariano Eraña as Secretary of Justice, Labor and Welfare
Preceded by Juan Nolasco as Secretary of Public Instruction, Health, and Public Welfare	Secretary of Public Instruction, Health, and Public Welfare; 1941–1944	Succeeded by Basilio Valdes as Secretary of Health and Public Welfare
Preceded by Jorge Bocobo as Secretary of Public Instruction	Secretary of Public Instruction, Health, and Public Welfare; 1941–1944	Succeeded by Carlos P. Romulo as Secretary of Public Instruction and Information
New office	Vice President of the Philippines; 1935–1944	Succeeded by Elpidio Quirino
Preceded by Manuel L. Quezon as President of the Philippine Commonwealth	President of the Philippines; 1944–1946	Succeeded by Manuel Roxas
Preceded by José Laurel as President of the Second Philippine Republic	President of the Philippines; 1944–1946	Succeeded by Manuel Roxas
