= Pedro Rodríguez (politician) =

Filipino politician

The Honourable Pedro Rodríguez
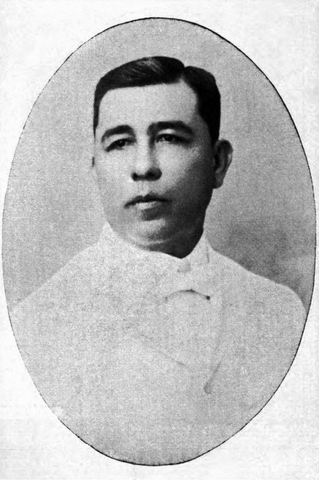
- Rodríguez as a member of the Philippine Assembly, 1908

Senator of the Philippines from the 10th district
- In office June 2, 1925 – June 2, 1931 Serving with Sergio Osmeña
- Preceded by: Celestino Rodriguez
- Succeeded by: Manuel Briones

Member of the Philippine Assembly from Cebu's 7th district
- In office 1907–1910
- Preceded by: Office created
- Succeeded by: Eulalio E. Causing

Presidente Municipal of Bogo, Cebu
- In office 1898–1903
- Succeeded by: Victoriano dela Vina

Personal details
- Born: Pedro Rodríguez y Lasala; June 26, 1868 Medellin, Cebu, Captaincy General of the Philippines
- Died: October 25, 1932 (aged 64)
- Party: Nacionalista (1907–1932)
- Other political affiliations: Independent (1898–1907)
- Spouse: Tomasa Chiong-Veloso
- Relations: Celestino Rodriguez (brother); Buenaventura Rodriguez (nephew); Arcadio Rodriguez (nephew)
- Children: 9, including Jose
- Parent(s): José Rodríguez y Álvarez; Vicenta Lasala
- Education: Ateneo de Manila University
- Occupation: Politician
- Profession: Agricultural Engineer
- Nickname(s): Nyoy Endong; Pahid sa mga Luha sa Kabus; Grand Old Man of Bogo

Pedro Rodríguez y Lasala (June 26, 1868 – October 25, 1932), also known as Nyoy Endong and the Grand Old Man of Bogo, was a Filipino politician. He served as Presidente Municipal of Bogo, Cebu and was one of the first members of the Philippine Assembly.

== Early life and education ==
Rodríguez was born in Medellin, Cebu and he attended the seminary of San Carlos and proceeded to the Ateneo de Manila where he graduated with a B.S. in Agricultural Engineering. He came from wealthy Bogo family with extensive landholdings in the northern sugar-belt towns of the province.

== Political career ==
Rodríguez was appointed as Municipal President of Bogo between 1898 until 1903. In 1905, he went to Spain as a delegate of the Philippine Assembly. In 1907, his brother, Celestino Rodríguez became senator deputised in the district. During his administration, he was part and given the leadership at the Inauguration of Independence held at the Old Plaza in Cebu, he said: "In our world, there are two respected mountains, namely Mount Sinai and Mount Sudlong. But the Filipinos love most Mount Sudlong because on its top… is where the first Philippine flag was raised in the skies of Cebu… where blood of our brothers spilled to fight for our country…" His high achievement as senator enabled him to become a member of the Nacionalista Party and he also served as a Senatorial District governor.

== Legacy ==
Two streets and a barangay in Bogo were named after him.
