= Celestino Rodriguez =

Filipino politician (1872–1955)

The Honorable Celestino Rodríguez
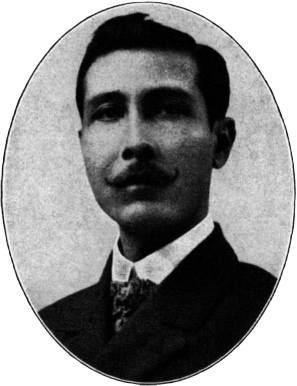
- Official portrait, c. 1917

Senator of the Philippines from the 10th district
- In office October 16, 1916 – June 2, 1925
- Preceded by: Position established
- Succeeded by: Pedro Rodríguez

Member of the House of Representatives of the Commonwealth of the Philippines from Cebu's 1st district
- In office June 9, 1945 – May 25, 1946
- Preceded by: Tereso Dosdos
- Succeeded by: Jovenal Almendras

Member of the National Assembly from Cebu's 1st district
- In office September 16, 1935 – December 30, 1938
- Preceded by: Tereso Dosdos
- Succeeded by: Tereso Dosdos

Member of the Philippine Assembly from Cebu's 1st district
- In office 1907–1912
- Preceded by: Position established
- Succeeded by: Gervasio Padilla

Municipal President of Cebu
- In office 1905–1907
- Vice President: Luciano Bacayo
- Preceded by: Florentino Rallos
- Succeeded by: Luciano Bacayo

Personal details
- Born: May 11, 1872 Bogo, Cebu, Captaincy General of the Philippines
- Died: 1955 (aged 82–83)
- Party: Nacionalista (1907–1946)
- Other political affiliations: Independent (1905–1907)
- Relations: Buenaventura Rodriguez; Jose V. Rodriguez; Pedro Rodriguez
- Education: Ateneo de Manila; La Universidad Central de Madrid
- Profession: Lawyer

Celestino Rodríguez y Lasala (May 11, 1872 – 1955) was a Filipino lawyer and politician from Cebu, Philippines. He served as member and deputy in the Philippine Assembly (1907–1912), as senator (1916–1922), member of the 1st National Assembly (1935–1938), and 1st Congress of the Commonwealth in 1945.

== Early life ==
He was born to parents José Francisco Rodríguez Álvarez, a Spaniard from San Esteban de Molleda, Asturias, Spain, and Vicenta Lasala in Bogo, Cebu, on May 11, 1872, coming from a wealthy Bogo family with extensive landholdings in the northern sugar-belt towns of the province. He married his cousin Ignacia Lasala and had four children. At Ateneo de Manila, he acquired a bachelor's degree in 1892 and a law degree from the Universidad Central de Madrid in 1900.

== Career ==
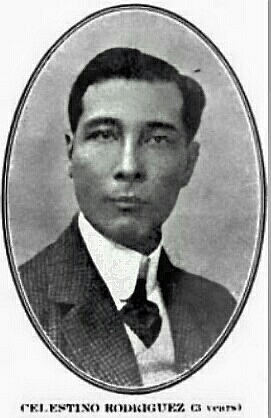
Rodriguez depicted in a publication of the Philippine Education, published April 1917

Passing the bar and having been called to the bench in 1902, he practiced law as his main profession.

In 1904, Rodriguez first became the municipal president of Cebu. In 1907, he was elected to the Philippine Assembly as member of the 1st Philippine Legislature representing Cebu's 1st district, then was reelected for the 2nd Philippine Legislature in 1910 until 1912, and would become deputy. The Philippine Assembly was organized to pave the way for independence from the American rule. He became the first representative of the old first district of Cebu, which included the towns of Bogo, Borbon, Catmon, Danao, Pilar, Poro, San Francisco, Sogod, Tabogon, and Tudela.

Later, Rodriguez was elected senator and served in the Fourth, Fifth, and Sixth Legislatures, from 1916 until 1925. At the time, the country was divided into 12 senatorial districts, with each district voting two senators; Rodriguez represented Cebu, which was the 10th district.

Rodriguez was voted as a member of the 1st National Assembly, representing Cebu's first district, from 1935 to 1938. He then served in the 1st Congress of the Commonwealth after the war in 1945.

== Historical commemoration ==
- Named Waling Waling Street previously and located within the Capitol compound, the Don Celestino Rodriguez Street was named in his honor by virtue of City Ordinance No. 635.
