= Sonny Umpad =

- Born: Santiago Umpad; June 26, 1948; Bogo, Cebu, Philippines
- Died: August 24, 2006 (aged 58); California, United States
- Other names: Master Sonny
- Citizenship: Philippines
- Occupation: Eskrimador

Master Santiago "Sonny" Umpad (June 26, 1948 – August 24, 2006) was a Filipino eskrimador. He was born in Bogo, Cebu, Philippines. As a young man, Umpad was exposed to the traditional Filipino martial arts of Eskrima; in his region the term "estocada" was also used to describe these arts. Umpad gave full credit to the Balintawak Eskrima and Doce Pares systems, which made up much of his early training. When he went to the United States, he continued his training with Master Raymond Tobosa in the art of Villabrille Kali.

== In the United States ==
Umpad settled in Northern California where he became acquainted with various masters from Stockton and the San Francisco Bay Area such as Angel Cabales, Leo Giron, Max Pallen, and Gilbert Tenio.

== Visayan Style Corto Kadena ==
Maestro Sonny created Visayan Style Corto Kadena (VSCK) Larga Mano Eskrima in the late 1970s. It's characterized by fluid movements, timing, elusiveness and explosive power. The art is based on the blade, although -sticks, pangamot (empty hands), and sikaran (kicks) are also used.

There are certain phases that track his research, which he synthesized into his own unique contribution to the art. Some of this progression can be seen in different generations of students, as he himself was always evolving.

Maestro Sonny gained global attention during his early practice format focused on doble kada (use of double sticks). His insights on leverage allowed Maestro Sonny, a slight man in stature, to hit with speed and power from any angle. While mastering this skill, Maestro Sonny developed fulcrum strikes unique to VSCK. One of his greatest contributions to Filipino Martial Arts (FMA) is the Centerline Roll, which incorporates Wing Chun's straight punch principle into a simple and unique method of double sticks. This methodology is what he referred to as "live" or random, meaning it does not rely on set patterns or left/right hand matchups to be effective.

Sonny worked during the late 1980s and early 1990s to define his sikaran, an FMA style of kicking and kneeing integrated with weaponry use. While his weapon and hand techniques draw strongly on Visayan styles, Sonny's footwork was heavily influenced by the Moro people. VSCK uses low stances and cross steps to control range, angles, and to uncoil with spring loaded explosiveness. In conjunction with the weapon above low stance attacks aim to cripple by hitting lowline targets such as joints. When Maestro Sonny introduced the pendulum flow into his students' training, he strived to further develop attributes that would be the hallmark of the VSCK - movement, timing, range, and improvisation.

During the early 1990s until his final days Maestro Sonny focused his training and teachings heavily on the random flow of the blade, both sword and knife within the pendulum. He believed that sword and knife fighting should simulate unpredictable exchanges over choreographed set drills. The evasiveness of the VCSK bladework refined the larga mano part of his art, Maestro Sonny practiced working with the cane and then developed the bugsay (oar). Used to transition fluidly from long to short range attacks..

Today many of Maestro Sonny's students continue to practice his art but only a few teach it. Sonny was very informal in his approach to teaching so there were no ranking systems nor official hierarchy in place. In fact, no one actually called him Maestro until he died. He encouraged all his students to teach what they knew as he believed that there was more to learn through teaching as it reinforced what they've learned.

== Teaching ==
Umpad was a reclusive man who taught small groups of students in his living room in order to devote sufficient attention to each student's progress. Umpad occasionally taught seminars with his business partner, Sifu Jesse Glover. Glover, the first student of Bruce Lee, referred to Umpad as "Bruce Lee with a stick" because of the speed and economy of his movement. Umpad was chosen as the model to portray Bruce for making the Bruce Lee video game. Many of Umpad's students in the Bay Area and Washington state came from backgrounds in Jun Fan/JKD, Kajukenbo and Wing Chun, as well as other Filipino styles.

In his last years Umpad made trips to Europe to teach at exhibitions in Switzerland and Germany, where he impressed people with his style. As a result of the exposure he got later in his career, Umpad developed qualified teachers to spread his art into Switzerland and Germany as well as in California and Washington state.

== Weapons ==
In conjunction with his martial art, Umpad was a craftsman, hand making many artist-grade weapons for students and friends. He was among the first to create light, viable padded sticks for training, coming up with not one but several designs. Other creations included knives, swords, spears, axes, whips and more, often made from common materials, based on both traditional and street weapons of the Philippines. Some of his students continue this tradition as well, designing and making weapons for use in training.

Umpad was keen to use modern technology. From early days he videotaped students’ classes, creating an archival history documenting his art. Additionally, he and a few of his past and current students were interviewed and filmed in 2006 for a video produced by the Dog Brothers, The Grandfathers Speak Vol. 2, Maestro Sonny Umpad.

== Death ==
Umpad died at home from cancer on August 24, 2006, at the age of 58. He was able in his last few months to see different generations of his students come together as a community which is dedicated to propagating his art.

== Legacy ==
Over the course of 30 years Sonny Umpad trained many people in the art of eskrima. Sonny promoted a number of these students to the rank of guro (teacher). The curriculum taught by these individuals will vary depending upon the era the student trained in (early, middle or late). The early era concentrating in more traditional eskrima drills and training, the middle and late eras focused on Sonny's many innovations.

== Filmography ==
- Filipino Martial Arts Digest, Special Edition 2006 Title: Maestro Sonny Umpad, Visayan Corto Kadena, An endless process of self-development and cultivation, 61pages Publisher is Mr. Steven K. Dowd available at www.maharlika-enterprizes.net
- Full length DVD entitled "The Grandfathers Speak, Volume 2 Maestro Sonny Umpad" Producer is Mr. Marc Denny and Directed/Edited by Mr.Ron Gabriel available at [www.dogbrothers.com]
- Balisong The Lethal Art of Filipino Knife Fighting 1986, 184pages, by Sid Campbell, Gary Cagaanan & Sonny Umpad, Paladin Press, Boulder Colorado ISBN 0-87364-354-2. (This book is still in publication)[www.amazon.com]
- Full length DVD entitled "Kelly S. Worden's Streetwise Self Defense, Cable TV show starring Sonny Umpad, Live in Seminar." NSI Headquarters, Tacoma Washington. Natural Spirit International Production.
