= Bogo, Cebu =

Component city in Cebu, Philippines

Bogo
- Component city
- City of Bogo
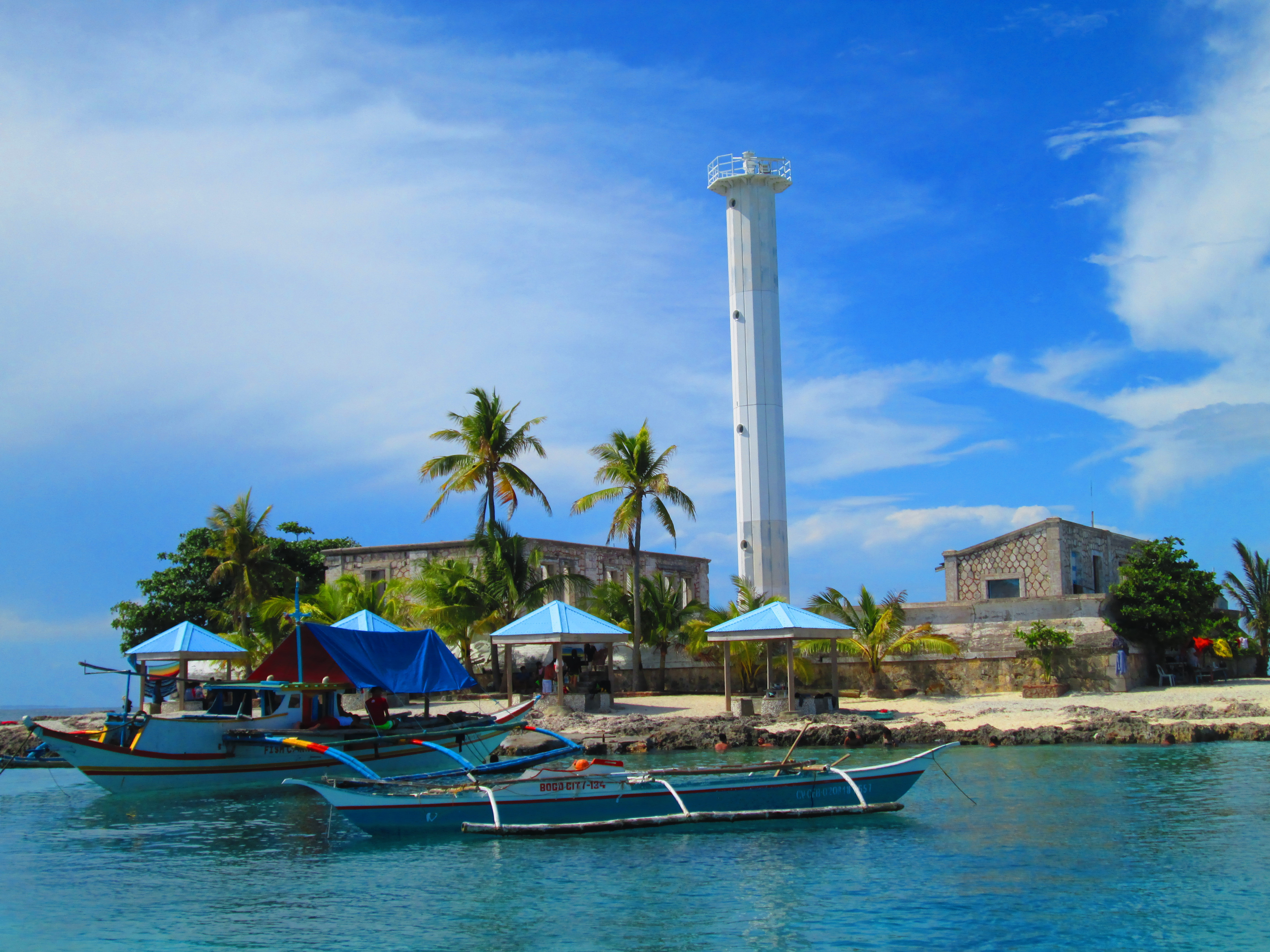
- Capitancillo Island

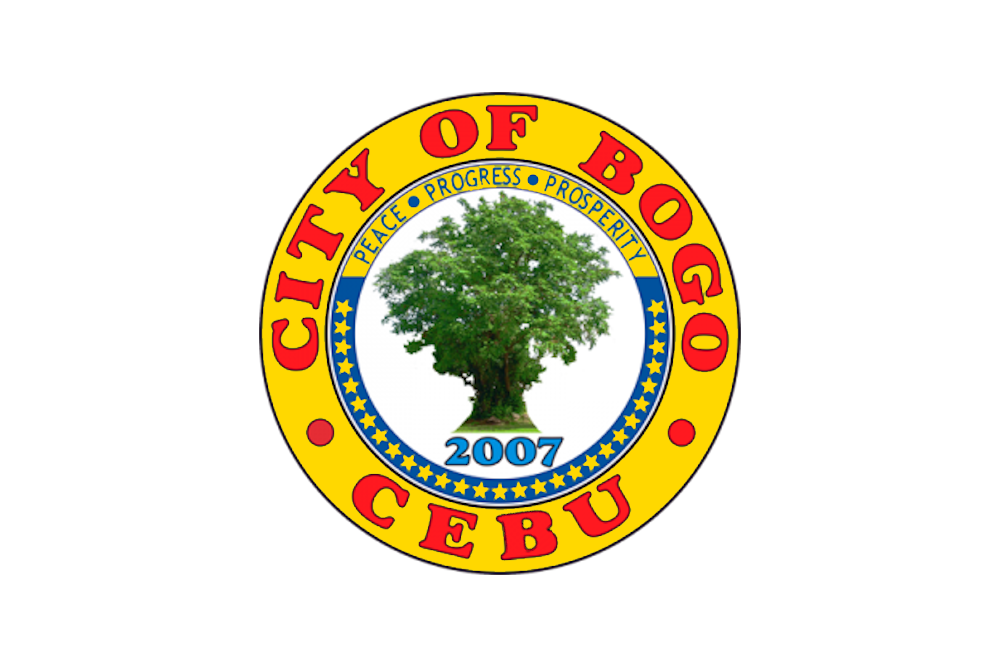
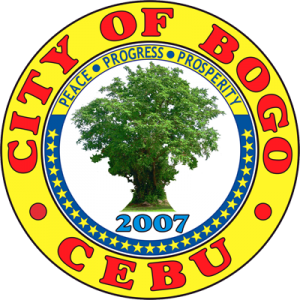
- Flag Seal
- Nickname: The Sugarcane Center of Cebu
- Anthem: Bogo Hymn
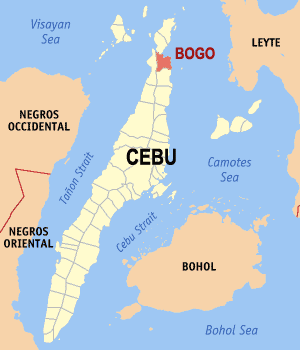
- Map of Cebu with Bogo highlighted
- Interactive map of Bogo
- Location within the Philippines
- Coordinates: 11°01′N 124°00′E
- Country: Philippines
- Region: Central Visayas
- Province: Cebu
- District: 4th district
- Founded: 1850
- Cityhood: June 16, 2007 (Lost cityhood in 2008 and 2010)
- Affirmed Cityhood: February 15, 2011
- Barangays: 29 (see Barangays)

Government
  - Type: Sangguniang Panlungsod
  - Mayor: Maria Cielo A. Martinez (1Cebu)
  - Vice Mayor: Carlo Jose A. Martinez (1Cebu)
  - Representative: Sun J. Shimura (PMP)
  - City Council: Members: Erwin P. Rosal; Luis A. Asierto, Jr.; Ellen M. Armenton-Xie; Vivian M. Canama; Jacinto Antonio R. Lepiten, Jr.; Lyndon Hee C. Acusa; Bienvenido O. Gulane II; Santiago M. Oliamot; Raul L. Ursal; Joseph R. Sevilla; Emily Juanillo ^{‡}; Ma. Nevhell L. Francisco ^{◌}; ‡ ex officio ABC president; ◌ ex officio SK chairman
  - Electorate: 57,046 voters (2025)

Area
  - Total: 103.52 km^{2} (39.97 sq mi)
- Elevation: 18 m (59 ft)
- Highest elevation: 292 m (958 ft)
- Lowest elevation: 0 m (0 ft)

Population (2024 census)
  - Total: 90,187
  - Density: 871.20/km^{2} (2,256.4/sq mi)
  - Households: 23,260

Economy
  - Income class: 4th city income class
  - Poverty incidence: 20.44% (2023)
  - Revenue: ₱ 835.2 million (2024)
  - Assets: ₱ 2,592 million (2024)
  - Expenditure: ₱ 574.5 million (2024)
  - Liabilities: ₱ 698.9 million (2024)

Service provider
  - Electricity: Cebu 2 Electric Cooperative (CEBECO 2)
- Time zone: UTC+8 (PST)
- ZIP code: 6010
- PSGC: 072211000
- IDD : area code: +63 (0)32
- Native languages: Cebuano; Tagalog
- Website: www.cityofbogocebu.gov.ph

Bogo [boˈɡo], officially the City of Bogo (Cebuano: Dakbayan sa Bogo; Hiligaynon: Dakbanwa sang Bogo; Filipino: Lungsod ng Bogo), is a component city in the province of Cebu, Philippines. According to the 2024 census, it has a population of 90,187 people.

== History ==
The first recorded settlements in Bogo date back from the 17th century. The city was named after a single Bogo tree (Garuga floribunda) on the shore that served as a bartering post at the site of the city’s wharf. In 1920s, large sugarcane plantations were established.

On June 16, 2007, Bogo became a city after ratification of Republic Act 9390 by 97.82% of voters.

The Supreme Court declared the cityhood law of Bogo and 15 other cities unconstitutional after a petition filed by the League of Cities of the Philippines in its ruling on November 18, 2008. On December 22, 2009, the cityhood law of Bogo and 15 other municipalities regained its status as cities again after the court reversed its 2008 ruling. On August 23, 2010, the court reinstated its 2008 ruling, causing Bogo and 15 cities to become regular municipalities. Finally, on February 15, 2011, Bogo became a city again including the 15 municipalities declaring that the conversion to cityhood met all legal requirements. The League of Cities of the Philippines recognized the cityhood of Bogo and 15 other cities on July 19, 2013.

The new Bogo City Hall was inaugurated on April 19, 2013, by President Benigno Aquino III. Later that year, on November 8, Typhoon Haiyan (Yolanda) hit northern Cebu, including Bogo, leaving 90% of the populace homeless and killing 13 people.

The city sustained extensive damage during the 2025 Cebu earthquake on September 30; 30 of the 72 deaths recorded came from Bogo.

== Geography ==
Bogo is located in the northeastern coast of Cebu province, on the principal island of Cebu. It is 99 kilometres (62 mi) from Cebu City and is accessible by land and sea. Bogo has an area of 103.5 square kilometres (40.0 sq mi), which constitutes 2.3% of the area of Cebu island and 2.1% of the total land area of Cebu province.

Bogo is bordered on the north by the town of Medellin, to the west by the town of San Remigio, on the east by the Camotes Sea, and on the south by the town of Tabogon.

=== Barangays ===
Bogo is politically subdivided into 29 barangays. Each barangay consists of puroks and some have sitios.

PSGC	Barangay	Population			±% p.a.	
		2024		2010		
072211002	Anonang Norte	1.8%	1,579	1,390	▴	0.89%
072211003	Anonang Sur	1.9%	1,748	1,346	▴	1.83%
072211004	Banban	2.5%	2,263	2,136	▴	0.40%
072211005	Binabag	2.2%	2,024	1,904	▴	0.42%
072211006	Bungtod (Poblacion)	2.6%	2,324	1,925	▴	1.31%
072211007	Carbon (Poblacion)	0.3%	263	392	▾	−2.73%
072211008	Cayang	4.3%	3,883	3,360	▴	1.01%
072211001	Cogon (Poblacion)	2.9%	2,634	2,852	▾	−0.55%
072211009	Dakit	6.0%	5,400	4,688	▴	0.99%
072211010	Don Pedro Rodriguez	4.0%	3,563	3,395	▴	0.34%
072211011	Gairan	10.8%	9,751	8,721	▴	0.78%
072211012	Guadalupe	3.9%	3,540	3,165	▴	0.78%
072211013	Lapaz	4.2%	3,743	3,084	▴	1.35%
072211014	La Purisima Concepcion (Poblacion)	1.0%	931	958	▾	−0.20%
072211015	Libertad	4.5%	4,029	3,694	▴	0.60%
072211016	Lourdes (Poblacion)	0.5%	456	495	▾	−0.57%
072211017	Malingin	3.0%	2,672	2,784	▾	−0.28%
072211018	Marangog	2.1%	1,894	1,697	▴	0.76%
072211019	Nailon	6.8%	6,093	4,896	▴	1.53%
072211020	Odlot	2.7%	2,480	2,328	▴	0.44%
072211021	Pandan (Pandan Heights)	2.0%	1,789	1,425	▴	1.59%
072211022	Polambato	4.3%	3,881	3,052	▴	1.68%
072211023	Sambag (Poblacion)	1.9%	1,678	1,850	▾	−0.67%
072211024	San Vicente (Poblacion)	0.6%	525	675	▾	−1.73%
072211025	Santo Niño	1.3%	1,131	674	▴	3.65%
072211026	Santo Rosario (Poblacion)	1.4%	1,287	914	▴	2.40%
072211027	Siocon	1.9%	1,680	1,285	▴	1.88%
072211029	Sudlonon	0.8%	686	896	▾	−1.83%
072211028	Taytayan	4.6%	4,193	3,930	▴	0.45%
	Total		90,187	69,911	▴	1.78%

=== Climate ===
Climate data for Bogo, Cebu
Month	Jan	Feb	Mar	Apr	May	Jun	Jul	Aug	Sep	Oct	Nov	Dec	Year
Mean daily maximum °C (°F)	28 (82)	29 (84)	29 (84)	30 (86)	30 (86)	30 (86)	29 (84)	29 (84)	29 (84)	29 (84)	29 (84)	29 (84)	29 (84)
Mean daily minimum °C (°F)	22 (72)	22 (72)	22 (72)	23 (73)	25 (77)	25 (77)	25 (77)	25 (77)	25 (77)	24 (75)	24 (75)	23 (73)	24 (75)
Average precipitation mm (inches)	78 (3.1)	57 (2.2)	84 (3.3)	79 (3.1)	118 (4.6)	181 (7.1)	178 (7.0)	169 (6.7)	172 (6.8)	180 (7.1)	174 (6.9)	128 (5.0)	1,598 (62.9)
Average rainy days	16.7	13.8	17.3	18.5	23.2	26.5	27.1	26.0	26.4	27.5	24.6	21.0	268.6
Source: Meteoblue

== Demographics ==
Population census of Bogo
Year	Pop.	±% p.a.
1903	14,915	—
1918	23,464	+3.07%
1939	27,517	+0.76%
1948	26,132	−0.57%
1960	29,841	+1.11%
1970	38,055	+2.46%
1975	39,144	+0.57%
1980	42,444	+1.63%
1990	51,083	+1.87%
1995	57,509	+2.24%
2000	63,869	+2.27%
2007	69,123	+1.10%
2010	69,911	+0.41%
2015	78,120	+2.14%
2020	88,867	+2.75%
2024	90,187	+0.35%
Source: Philippine Statistics Authority

== Economy ==
Poverty incidence of Bogo (%)

Source: Philippine Statistics Authority

== Culture ==
=== Fiestas and festivals ===
Piyesta sa Bogo

Bogo City celebrates two town fiestas in every year in honor of its patron saint, Saint Vincent Ferrer.

- April 5 is the official feast day or the death anniversary of San Vicente Ferrer. Many pilgrims around the world will come to venerate the patron saint and almost all activities in this fiesta are religious activities only.
- May 26–27 considered the biggest town fiesta celebration where most visitors come to witness the events, which include the search for Ms Bogo Festival Queen and the celebration of the official festival of Bogo City, the Pintos Festival. (Note: "Pintos" is a popular delicacy made from ground corn and wrapped in corn husk.) The Pintos Festival involves creative street dancing and ritual showdown depicting the sangi (Planting), the harvest of corn, and the processing of the corn masa into the Pintos, as well as the thanksgiving of the abundant harvest. The festival is also celebrated through merrymaking by dancing the 'Kuyayang' – a Bogohanon courtship dance staged in front of the community during fiestas. Barangays all around Bogo join together to form five cluster tribes.

Bogo City Charter Day
- June 16.

== Education ==
The public schools in Bogo are administered by the Schools Division of Bogo City.

=== Elementary schools ===
- Anonang Norte Elementary School — Anonang Norte
- Anonang Sur Elementary School — Anonang Sur
- Banban Elementary School — Banban
- Binabag Elementary School — Binabag
- Bogo I Central Elementary School — P. Rodriguez Street, Cogon
- Bogo II Central Elementary School — San Vicente Street, San Vicente
- Bogo III Central Elementary School — P. Ortega Street, Gairan
- Bung-aw Elementary School — Sitio Bung-aw, Cayang
- Cayang Elementary School — Cayang
- Combado Elementary School — Sitio Combado, Guadalupe
- Dakit Elementary School — Dakit
- Don Pedro Rodriguez Elementary School — Don Pedro Rodriguez
- Guadalupe Elementary School — Guadalupe
- La Paz Elementary School — La Paz
- Libertad Elementary School — Libertad
- Malingin Elementary School — Malingin
- Marangog Elementary School — Marangog
- Marcelo B. Fernan-Polambato Elementary School — Polambato
- Nailon Elementary School — Nailon
- Odlot Elementary School — Odlot
- Siocon Elementary School — Siocon

=== High schools ===
- Anonang Norte National High School — Anonang Norte
- Anonang Sur Tabaco Frasco National High School — Anonang Sur
- Bartolome C. Pianar Memorial National High School — Dakit
- Binabag National High School — Binabag
- Cayang National High School — Cayang
- Don Jose (Pepe) Lepiten National High School — Siocon
- Don Potenciano Catarata Memorial National High School — Guadalupe
- Eduardo T. Oporto Memorial National High School — Banban
- Jovencio N. Masong National High School — Nailon
- La Paz National High School — La Paz
- Libertad National High School — Libertad
- Malingin National High School — Malingin
- Marcelo B. Fernan National High School — Polambato
- Odlot National High School — Odlot

Integrated schools:

- City of Bogo Science and Arts Academy — Saint Joseph Village, Cogon
- Don Celestino Martinez Sr. Taytayan Integrated School — Taytayan

=== Private schools ===
- Araneta Learning Center for Child Development — A. Pedroza Street, La Purisima Concepcion
- Bogo Christian Learning and Development School — F. Manubag Street cor. Aballe St., Lourdes
- Cebu Roosevelt Memorial Colleges Inc. — San Vicente Street, Lourdes
- Felipe R. Verallo Memorial Foundation College — Dakit
- Northern Cebu Colleges — San Vicente Street, San Vicente
- St. Louise de Marillac College of Bogo — Sor D. Rubio Street, San Vicente
- San Roque College de Cebu - Bogo Campus — Dakit

== Media ==
Radio stations
  - 90.9 MHz Brigada News DYBO FM
  - 91.7 MHz Radyo Natin DYBG FM
  - 93.3 MHz Hug Radio DYJS FM
  - 94.1 MHz CRMC Radio DYVL FM
  - 100.5 MHz DYCM.DotTV FM Bogo City - simultaneously broadcast with DYCM.DotTV 1152 kHz AM Cebu City
  - 102.1 MHz RCFM DYDX FM
  - 98.1 MHz The Edge Radio Bogo FM (soon)

Cable and TV stations

- Bogo Cable TV, Inc.

Major TV networks based in Cebu City have signals in the city

Newspapers

National and local daily newspapers, tabloids and magazines are available in the city.

City of Bogo has its own quarterly official publication "KANAAS" (Gikan sa Amihanan – A Whisper from the North).

Blogs

- The Bogo Times
- Bogophoria

== Tourism ==
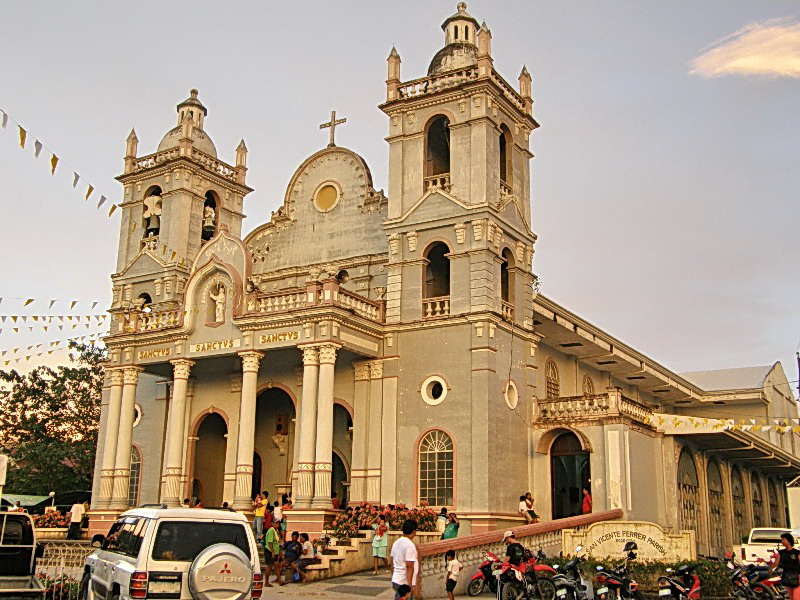
The Archdiocesan Shrine of St. Vincent Ferrer

- The Archdiocesan Shrine of St. Vincent Ferrer
- The Shrine of the Our Lady of the Miraculous Medal - Lapaz, Bogo City
- Bogo City Hall
- Capitancillo Islet
- Bogo City Plaza Park
- Bogo City Public Library and Museum
- Our Lady of Remedies in Odlot
- Marz Valley Nature Park
- Arapal Nature Retreat

== Notable personalities ==
- Gabriel "Flash" Elorde (1935-1985), professional boxer, world super featherweight champion.
- Marcelo Fernan (1927-1999), held the top position of the two branches of government of the Republic of the Philippines – as Chief Justice of the Supreme Court of the Philippines and then as President of the Senate of the Philippines.
- Celestino Martinez, authored "RA 7160 – The Local Government Code of the Philippines"
- Vina Morales (born Sharon Garcia Magdayao, 1975) singer, actress and model
- Niel Murillo (born Orlando Murillo IV, 1999) singer, Pinoy Boyband Superstar winner
- Pedro Rodríguez (1869-1932), known as the Grand Old Man of Bogo.
- Sonny Umpad (1948-2006), Filipino eskrimadors

== City hymn ==
The Bogo City council has passed an ordinance requiring all schools in Bogo to sing the Bogo Hymn in all flag-raising ceremonies and school programs just like the Philippine National Anthem, "Lupang Hinirang". Radio Stations based in Bogo are also required to play the hymn every sign-on and sign-off. City legislation prohibits the alteration of the lyrics, tempo and tune in the rendition of Bogo hymn entitled "Padayon Bogo".

== Sources ==
- Bogo Online, Eufrosino Ursal Luna (November 26, 1965), Don Pedro Rodriguez - Grand Old Man of Bogo DON PEDRO LAZALA RODRIGUEZ - 1869-1932: The Bogo Hero. (in Cebuano), archived from the original on June 29, 2010
- Republic Act No. 7160 (October 10, 1991), Local Government Code of 1991 (PDF)
- Philippine Daily Inquirer, Jolene Bulambot (June 18, 2007). "Comelec affirms Bogo is now 6th city of Cebu". Archived from the original on December 10, 2014.
- Philippine Star, Louis Bacani (November 7, 2013). "MONSTER TYPHOON GROWS STRONGER; 10 areas in Visayas under signal no.4". Archived from the original on November 9, 2013.
