= Ulyss =

Ulyss may refer to:

== People, figures, animals ==
Ulyss is a male given name. People with this name include:

- Ulyss Blair, a tattoo artist from Florence, Alabama, USA, who appeared on Ink Master season 9
- Ulyss Grant, the childhood name of Ulysses S. Grant, the 18th President of the United States of America; see List of nicknames of presidents of the United States
- an alternative romanization spelling of the Greek mythological hero Odysseus (Ulixes, Ulysses)

=== Animals ===
- Ulyss Morinda, a Belgian show jumping horse that competed at the 2018 CSIO Gijón

== Other uses ==
- Ulyss Yerevan, Yerevan, Armenia; a soccer club
- ULySS (Universite-de-Lyon Spectroscopic-analysis Software), a spectroscopic modelling software based on GNU Data Language

== See also ==
- Ulysses (disambiguation)
- Ulysse (disambiguation)
- Ulyses
- Ulisses (disambiguation)
- Ulisse (disambiguation)
- Ulises (disambiguation)
- Ulise
- Uliss (disambiguation)
- Ulis (disambiguation)
- Uli (disambiguation)
- ULE (disambiguation)
- ULY (disambiguation)
- Ulixes
- Odysseus (disambiguation)
