= ULY =

ULY may refer to:

== Geography ==
- Ulyanovsk Vostochny Airport (IATA airport code: ULY; ICAO airport code: UWLW), Ulyanovsk, Ulyanovsk Oblast, Russia
- Ulyanovsk Oblast (region code ULY, RU-ULY), Russia

== Linguistics ==
- Uyghur Latin Yéziqi (ULY; Uyghur: ئۇيغۇر لاتىن يېزىقى, Uyghur Latin Yëziqi, Уйғур Латин Йезиқи), a unified Latin-Script Uyghur alphabet
- Polci language (ISO 639 language code: uly), a language found in Nigeria

== People and characters ==
- A diminutive of the male given name Ulysses (given name)
  - A romanized form of the name of the Greek mythical character Odysseus

=== Persons ===
- Uly Boutry, a German actress who starred in the 1929 film Somnambul
- Uly Darly, a Canadian actress who starred in the 2004 film On the Verge of a Fever
- Uly van Dayen, an Austrian actress from the 1926 film The Queen of Moulin Rouge
- Ulysses "Uly" Diaz, a bare knuckle sport fighter who competed in 2020, 2021, 2022 editions of the Bare Knuckle Fighting Championship
- Uly Javier, a Philippine politician, who was incumbent going into the 2025 Philippine local elections in Mimaropa
- Ulysses "Uly" Morazan, a creative who was interviewed in 2024 on The Jennifer Hudson Show
- Ulysses "Uly" Rodriguez, Philippine basketball player selected to the Barangay Ginebra San Miguel all-time roster
- Uly Schlesinger, a U.S. actor who starred in the TV show Generation (2021 TV series)
- Uly Smith (born 1909), brother of U.S. boxer Tiger Flowers (1895–1927)
- Yakobus Jacki Uly Sambo (born 2005), son of Indonesian police general Ferdy Sambo (born 1973)
- DJ Uly, who was featured on the 2012 El Imperio Nazza album

=== Fictional characters ===
- Ulyssandra "Uly" Blint, a fictional character from the Night Angel novel series; see List of Night Angel characters
- Ulysses "Uly" Adair, a fictional character from the 1990s U.S. TV show Earth 2 (TV series)
- Uly McPherson, a fictional character from the novel Holmes on the Range
- Uly, a fictional character from the 2023 Philippine film Love You Long Time
- Uly, a fictional character from the Mexican media franchise Huevos (film series)
- Uly, a fictional character from the Korean animated TV show Canimals
- Uly, a fictional fox from the children's novel Scary Stories for Young Foxes

== Other uses ==
- Urgent.ly (NASDAQ stock ticker: ULY), U.S. roadside assistance mobile app company
- ULY codec family, used in the Ut Video Codec Suite

== See also ==
- Ulies
- Uli (disambiguation)
- Uley
- ULE (disambiguation)
- Odysseus (disambiguation)
- Ulysses (disambiguation)
- Ulysse (disambiguation)
- Ulyses
- Ulisses (disambiguation)
- Ulisse (disambiguation)
- Ulises
- Ulise
- Ulis (disambiguation)
- Ulixes
