= Ulisses (disambiguation) =

Ulisses is a Portuguese male given name, the Portuguese version of the English name Ulysses.

Ulisses may also refer to:

== People ==
- Ulisses (footballer, born 1986), Brazilian footballer
- Ulisses (footballer, born 1989), Brazilian footballer
- Ulisses (footballer, born 1999), Brazilian footballer
- Tiago Ulisses (born 1989), Brazilian footballer

== Groups, organizations ==
- Ulisses FC, Yerevan, Armenia; a football team
- Ulisses Spiele GmbH (German: Ulysses Games Ltd.), a games publisher

== Other uses ==
- Ulisses (album), a 2005 album by Cristina Branco

== See also ==
- ULY (disambiguation)
- Uli (disambiguation)
- Ulis (disambiguation)
- Ulise, the Romanian version of the name
- Ulises (disambiguation), the Spanish version of the name
- Uliss (disambiguation), the Russian version of the name
- Ulisse (disambiguation), the Italian version of the name
- Ulysses (disambiguation), the English version of the name
- Ulysse (disambiguation), the French version of the name
- Odysseus (disambiguation), the Greek version of the name
