= Uliss =

Uliss (Russian: Улисс, romanized: Uliss, lit. 'Ulysses') is the Russian version of the English name Ulysses, referring to the mythical Greek Odysseus.

Uliss or ULISS may also refer to:

- FC Uliss Erewan, Erewan, Armenia; the soccer club Uliss
- Uliss Bay (Ulysses Bay), Vladivostok, Primorskiy Kray, Outer Manchuria, Russian Far East; a basing area for the Pacific Fleet (Russia) of Imperial Russia, Soviet Union, Russian Federation
- Russian galley Uliss (18th century), see List of ship launches in 1736
- Russian frigate Uliss (18th century), see List of Russian sail frigates
- SAGEM ULISS (Uliss), an aviation inertial navigation system (INS) manufactured by SAGEM, used in the Dassault Mirage 2000, 2000N/2000D, Dassault/Dornier Alpha Jet

== See also ==
- Ulis (disambiguation)
- Ulisse (disambiguation), the Italian version of the name
- Ulisses (disambiguation), the Portuguese version of the name
- Ulise, the Romanian version of the name
- Ulises, the Spanish version of the name
- Ulyses, a male given name
- Ulysse (disambiguation), the French version of the name
- Ulysses (disambiguation), the English version of the name
- Odysseus (disambiguation), the Greek version of the name
- Ulixes
