= Ulises (disambiguation) =

Ulises is a Spanish male given name.

Ulises may also refer to:

- Ulises (orca), a killer whale
- Teatro Ulises (Spanish: Ulysses Theatre), a former theater in Mexico City, Mexico
- Ulises (2011 film) (English: Ulysses), a Spanish-language Chilean film

== See also ==
- Ulis (disambiguation)
- Ulise, the Romanian version of the name
- Uliss (disambiguation), the Russian version of the name
- Ulisses (disambiguation), the Portuguese version of the name
- Ulisse (disambiguation), the Italian version of the name
- Ulysse (disambiguation), the French version of the name
- Ulysses (disambiguation), the English version of the name
- Odysseus (disambiguation), the Greek version of the name
