= Ulyses =

- Gender: male
- Language: English, Spanish

Origin
- Language: Greek
- Origin: Odysseus

Other names
- Related names: Ulysses (Latin), Ulysses (English), Ulysse (French), Ulisses (Portuguese), Ulises (Spanish), Ulisse (Italian), Ulise (Romanian)

Ulyses is a male given name.

People with this name include:

- Ulyses Daniel Alonso (20th century), husband of Myrka Dellanos
- Ulyses Garces (fl. early 21st century), Philippine politician who was a member of the House of Representatives of the Philippines
- Ulyses L. Hewit (19th century), U.S. soldier in the American Civil War, who was captain in the 125th Pennsylvania Infantry Regiment
- Ulyses Petit de Murat (1907–1983), Argentine poet and screenwriter
- Ulyses F.J. Pardiñas (born 1969), Argentinian zoologist, namesake of the Pardiñas' Andean mouse
- Ulyses Puzon (fl. late 20th century), Philippine boxer who lost to Dennis Laurente and Chamuekpet Hapalang
- Ulyses Sapalo (fl. early 21st century), Philippine politician who stood for election in the 2007 Philippine House of Representatives party-list election
- Junior Thurman (born 1963, as Ulyses Thurman Jr.), U.S. American football player
- Franklin Ulyses Valderrama (born 1962), U.S. judge

== See also ==
- Ulisse (given name), an Italian male given name
- Ulisses, a Portuguese male given name
- Ulises, a Spanish male given name
- Ulysse, a French male given name
- Ulysses (given name), an English male given name
