= Ulisse =

Ulisse is the Italian form of the Latin version of the name of the Greek mythic hero Odysseus. It may further refer to:

== People ==
- Ulisse (given name), an Italian masculine given name, the Italian version of Ulysses, equivalent of the Greek Odysseus
- Donna Ulisse, U.S. singer-songwriter
- Nicola di Ulisse (15th century), Italian painter

== Other uses ==
- Il ritorno d'Ulisse in patria, 1639–1640 opera by Claudio Monteverdi
- Ulisse (opera), a 1968 opera by Luigi Dallapiccola about Ulysses
- Ulisse (film), a 1954 Italian/American film about Ulysses and the Odyssey
- "Ulisse (You Listen)", a 2008 song by Caparezza off the album Le dimensioni del mio caos

== See also ==
- Ulises, the Spanish version of the Italian Ulisse
- Ulisses, the Portuguese version of the Italian Ulisse
- Ulysse (disambiguation), the French version of the Italian Ulisse
- Ulysses (disambiguation), the English version of the Italian Ulisse
- Odysseus (disambiguation), the Greek version of the Italian Ulisse
