= Ulli =

Ulli may refer to:

- Pulkovo Airport (ICAO airport code ULLI)
- Cyclone Ulli, an intense and deadly European windstorm, forming on December 31, 2011, off the coast of New Jersey and dissipating January 7, 2012

== See also ==
- Uli (disambiguation)
