= Cantagalli =

Cantagalli may refer to:

- 34718 Cantagalli, a minor planet
- Giovanni Cantagalli (1914–2008), Italian hammer thrower
- Luca Cantagalli (born 1965), Italian volleyball player
- Ulisse Cantagalli (1839–1901), Italian pottery producer in Florence, Italy
