= SS Ulysses =

A number of steamships were named Ulysses, including:

- SS Ulysses (1874), 118 GRT
- SS Ulysses (1913), 14,652 GRT
- SS Ulysses (1914), 19,585 tons displacement
- SS Ulysses (1915), 10,780 GRT
- SS Ulysses (1918), 2,666 GRT

== See also ==
- HMS Ulysses, for Royal Navy vessels
- MV Ulysses, for motor vessels named Ulysses
- USS Ulysses, for United States Navy vessels
- Ulysses (disambiguation)
