= MV Ulysses =

A number of motor vessels have been named Ulysses:

- Ulysses (1870), which was wrecked in 1887, Gulf of Suez
- MV Ulysses (1941), the former Empire Creek, which was wrecked in 1979
- MV Ulysses (2000), a RO-RO ferry used by Irish Ferries since 2001
- MV Ulysses (2006), a container ship, IMO 9364203

== See also ==
- HMS Ulysses, for Royal Navy vessels
- SS Ulysses, for steamships named Ulysses
- USS Ulysses, for United States Navy vessels
- Ulysses (disambiguation)
