= Christian McKay Heidicker =

American author of children's books

- Born: February 12, 1982 (age 44)
- Occupation: Writer
- Writing career
- Notable work: Scary Stories for Young Foxes
- Notable awards: John Newbery Honor 2020
- Website: www.cmheidicker.com

Christian McKay Heidicker (born February 12, 1982) is an American author of children's books. His book Scary Stories for Young Foxes received a Newbery Honor in 2020.

== Life and work ==
Prior to his career as a novelist, Heidicker held several jobs in the education field. These included creating instructional comic books, writing articles on science and history for students, and teaching creative writing at Broadview University.

Heidicker's first novel, the young adult title Cure for the Common Universe, was published in 2016. Scary Stories for Young Foxes, his first middle grade book, appeared in 2019. It was hailed by Kirkus Reviews as "dark and skillfully distressing." Scary Stories went on to win a Newbery Honor in 2020.

Heidicker lives and works in Salt Lake City, Utah.

== Bibliography ==
Young adult novels

- Cure for the Common Universe (Simon & Schuster, 2016)
- Attack of the 50 Foot Wallflower (Simon & Schuster, 2018)

Middle Grade novels

- Scary Stories for Young Foxes (Henry Holt, 2019)
- Thieves of Weirdwood, co-written with William Shivering (Henry Holt, 2020)
- Ghosts of Weirdwood, co-written with William Shivering (Henry Holt, 2021)
- Scary Stories for Young Foxes: The City (Henry Holt, 2021)
- Nightmarea of Weirdwood, co-written with William Shivering (Henry Holt, 2022)
