= USS Ulysses =

USS Ulysses may refer to:

- SS Ulysses (Panama Collier No. 1), a United States Navy-designed collier built under U.S. Navy supervision for the Panama Canal Company in 1914; never commissioned in the United States Navy; converted to a tanker in 1930; renamed San Blas in 1942; burned and sank at La Plata in 1944
- USS Ulysses (ARB-9), an LST-542-class tank landing ship built in 1944; converted to a battle damage repair ship; decommissioned in 1946; transferred to West Germany in 1961; final fate unknown

== See also ==
- USS Ulysses S. Grant
- HMS Ulysses for Royal Navy vessels
- MV Ulysses for motor vessels named Ulysses
- SS Ulysses for steamships named Ulysses
