= HMS Ulysses =

Four British Royal Navy ships have been called HMS Ulysses:

- HMS Ulysses (1779), 44-gun fifth rate launched in 1779 and sold in 1816. Because Ulysses served in the navy's Egyptian campaign (8 March to 2 September 1801), her officers and crew qualified for the clasp "Egypt" to the Naval General Service Medal, which the Admiralty issued in 1847 to all surviving claimants.
- HMS Ulysses (1913) was briefly the name of a destroyer, launched on 18 August 1913, and renamed Lysander on 30 September 1913.
- HMS Ulysses (1917), a modified R-class destroyer launched in 1917 and sunk in a collision in 1919
- HMS Ulysses (R69), a World War II U-class destroyer launched in 1943, reclassified as a frigate in 1953, and sold for scrap in 1979.

== In fiction ==
HMS Ulysses was also the name of a fictional light cruiser in the eponymous novel by Alistair MacLean.

== See also ==
- MV Ulysses, for motor vessels named Ulysses
- SS Ulysses, for steamships named Ulysses
- USS Ulysses, for United States Navy vessels
- Ulysses (disambiguation)
