= Ulysses (sculpture) =

1988 sculpture by Alexander Liberman in Los Angeles, California, U.S.

- The sculpture in 2022
- Artist: Alexander Liberman
- Year: 1988
- Location: Los Angeles, California, U.S.
- 34°3′7″N 118°15′13.2″W

Ulysses is a 1988 sculpture by Alexander Liberman, installed outside Los Angeles' Mellon Bank Center, in the U.S. state of California.

== See also ==
- 1988 in art
