= Ulysses =

Ulysses commonly refers to:

- Odysseus, a hero in Greek mythology
- Ulysses (novel), by James Joyce

Ulysses may also refer to:

== People ==
- Ulysses (given name), including a list of people with this name

== Places ==
=== Places in the United States ===
- Ulysses, Kansas
- Ulysses, Kentucky
- Ulysses, Nebraska
- Ulysses Township, Butler County, Nebraska
- Ulysses, New York
- Ulysses, Pennsylvania
- Ulysses Township, Pennsylvania

=== Other places ===
- 5254 Ulysses, an asteroid

== Animals ==
- Ulysses butterfly (Papilio ulysses) a butterfly endemic to Australasia
- Ulysses (horse) (born 2013), a thoroughbred racehorse

== Arts and entertainment ==
=== Literature ===
- "Ulysses" (poem), by Alfred Lord Tennyson
- Ulysses (play), 1705, by Nicholas Rowe
- Ulysses, a 1902 play by Stephen Phillips
- HMS Ulysses (novel), by Alistair Maclean
- Ulysses (comics), two members of a fictional group in the Marvel Comics universe
- Ulysses Klaue, a character in Marvel comic books
- Ulysses: Jeanne d'Arc and the Alchemist Knight, a light novel

=== Film and television ===
- Ulysses (1954 film), starring Kirk Douglas based on the story of Homer's Odyssey
- Ulysses (1967 film), based on Joyce's novel
- Ulysses (2011 film), a Chilean film
- Ulysses (broadcast), a dramatised radio broadcast of Joyce's novel
- "Ulysses" (Staged), a 2020 television episode
- Ulysses 31, a French-Japanese anime television program
- Ulixes, a fictional spacecraft in the 4th season of Teenage Mutant Ninja Turtles

=== Music ===
- Ulysse (Rebel), a 1703 French opera by Jean-Fery Rebel
- Ulisse, a 1968 Italian opera by Luigi Dallapiccola
- Ulysses, a 1947 English-language cantata by Mátyás Seiber
- Ulysses (American band), an American indie rock band
- Ulysses (German band), a German progressive rock band
- Ulysses (EP), by Shimamiya Eiko, 2005
- "Ulysses" (song), by Franz Ferdinand, 2008
- "Ullyses", a song by Dead Can Dance from the 1988 album The Serpent's Egg

=== Other arts and entertainment ===
- Ulysses (sculpture), 1988, by Alexander Liberman
- Ulysses 1994XF04, a fictional asteroid in the video game Ace Combat
- Ulysses, an assumed name of the antagonist of the Fallout: New Vegas expansion Lonesome Road

== Events and storms ==
- Typhoon Dolphin (2008), a Pacific Typhoon known as Ulysses in the Philippines
- Typhoon Vamco, a 2020 Pacific Typhoon known as Ulysses in the Philippines

== Science and technology ==
- ULYSSES (cable system), a submarine communications cable network
- Ulysses (robot), a bomb-detecting robot
- Ulysses (spacecraft), a space probe designed to study the Sun
- Ulysses (text editor), a software product for creative writing
- 5254 Ulysses, an asteroid

== Sport ==
- Ulisses FC, a defunct Armenian football club
- Ulysses F.C., a former English football club

== Ships ==
- HMS Ulysses, four ships of the British Royal Navy
- MV Ulysses, several ships
- SS Ulysses, several ships
- USS Ulysses, several ships of the US Navy
- Ulysses (yacht), an expedition yacht

== Vehicles ==
- Ulysses (spacecraft), a space probe designed to study the Sun
- Ulysses, manufactured by the Buell Motorcycle Company
- Ulysses (later Grierson), a GWR 3031 Class locomotive on the Great Western Railway between 1891 and 1915
- Fiat Ulysse

== Other uses ==
- Ulysses Club, an international motorcycling club

== See also ==
- Odysseus (disambiguation), the Greek form of this name
- Ulysse (disambiguation), the French version of Ulysses
- Ulisses, the Portuguese version of Ulysses
- Ulises, the Spanish version of Ulysses
- Ulises (orca), a killer whale
- Ulisse, an Italian opera
