= Ule (company) =

Chinese e-commerce platform

Ule (Chinese: 邮乐网; pinyin: yóulèwǎng; lit. 'Happy Post Web') is a Chinese e-commerce platform. A joint venture of TOM Group and China Post, Ule focuses on online-to-offline shopping in rural areas of China.

== History ==
Ule was founded in 2009. In 2017, the Malaysia External Trade Development Corp partnered with Ule to sell Malaysian products through the platform.

As of 2017, the platform had 250,000 stores on it.
