= Ulysse (surname) =

Ulysse is a surname. Notable people with the surname include:

- Denso Ulysse (1998), Haitian soccer player
- Fred Ulysse (1934–2020), French actor
- Gina Athena Ulysse (born 1966), Haitian-American anthropologist, feminist and artist
- Yves Ulysse Jr. (born 1988), Canadian boxer
