= Ulisse Pichi =

Italian painter (1867–1925)

- Born: 1867; Livorno
- Died: 1925 (aged 57–58)

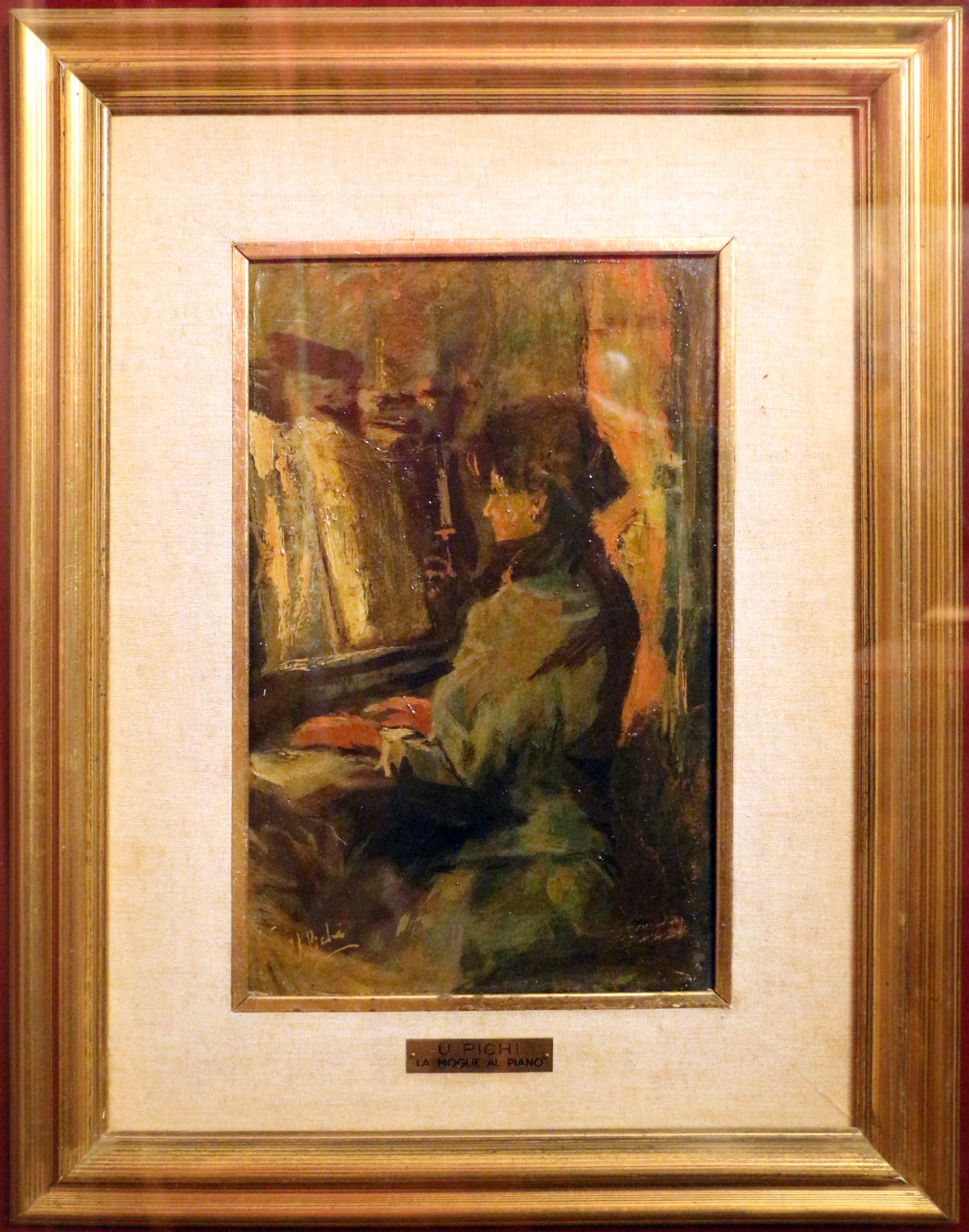
Wife at piano (1920) by Ulisse Pichi

Ulisse Pichi (1867–1925) was an Italian painter born in Livorno. He often painted military subjects and battles, but also land- and sea-scapes.

He was a pupil of Natale Betti. In 1888, he went to Florence to study with Giovanni Fattori at the Accademia di Belle Arti di Firenze. He initially exhibited in Livorno under the pseudonym of Norion S. He later became friends with Silvestro Lega. Among his works are “Lo scultore Ermenegildo Bois” and “Il ritratto della moglie al piano”.
