= Barangay Ginebra San Miguel all-time roster =

List of players for a Philippine basketball team

The following is a list of players, both past and current, who have appeared at least in one game for the Barangay Ginebra San Miguel PBA franchise.

== A ==
Name	Position	School/University	Nickname	Years with Barangay Ginebra		No. of seasons	Ref.
Name	Position	School/University	Nickname	From	To	No. of seasons	Ref.
Dylan Ababou	Small forward	UST	Super Ababou	2012	2015	4	
Johnny Abarrientos	Point guard	FEU	Flying A	2006	2009	4	
RJ Abarrientos	Point guard	FEU	The Blitz	2024	present		
John Abis	Small forward	Perpetual		2025	present		
Ben Adamos	Center	Perpetual		2024	2026	2	
Rommel Adducul	Center	San Sebastian	The General	2003	2006	4	
Mike Advani	Point guard	San Beda	Mukesh	1986	1988	3	
Japeth Aguilar	Center / Power forward	Western Kentucky	Japeth Like It's Hot, Jumping Japeth	2013	present		
Peter Aguilar	Center	Trinity		1989	1990	2	
Raymond Aguilar	Power forward / Center	NU	Mr. Never Heard	2017	present		
Maverick Ahanmisi	Point guard / Shooting guard	Minnesota	Mav	2023	2025	2	
Teroy Albarillo	Point guard	Mindanao		1996	1997	2	
Chris Alexander (Import)	Center	Iowa State	Alexander the Great	2008 2011		2	
Alejo Alolor	Shooting guard / Small forward	Visayas	Ponky	1993	1994	2	
Paul Alvarez	Shooting guard / Small forward	San Sebastian	Mr. Excitement	1998		1	
Rich Alvarez	Power forward / Small forward	Ateneo		2009	2010	1	
Mildon Ambres (Import)	Power forward / Small forward	Southern Nazarene		2010		1	
Dondon Ampalayo	Power forward	USJ–R	The Magic Man	1986	1993	8	
Jimbo Aquino	Shooting guard / Small forward	San Sebastian		2010	2011	1	
JR Aquino	Small forward / Power forward	De La Salle		2007	2009	2	
Marlou Aquino	Center	Adamson	The Skyscraper	1996	2000	5	
Francis Arnaiz	Shooting guard	Ateneo	Mr. Clutch	1984	1986	3	
Paul Artadi	Point guard	UE	Kid Lightning	2007	2009	2	
MJ Ayaay	Small forward / Shooting guard	Lyceum		2021	2022	1	
Danilo Aying	Small forward	Southwestern	Danny	1999		1	

== B ==
Name	Position	School/University	Nickname	Years with Barangay Ginebra		No. of seasons	Ref.
Name	Position	School/University	Nickname	From	To	No. of seasons	Ref.
Cyrus Baguio	Shooting guard / Small forward	UST	Skyrus	2009	2010	1	
Jerrick Balanza	Shooting guard	Letran		2020		1	
Estong Ballesteros	Small forward / Power forward	UST		2003	2005	2	
Mac Baracael	Small forward / Power forward	FEU	Kalibre	2013	2015	2	
Marlon Basco	Center	Luzon		2001		1	
Billy Ray Bates (Import)	Small forward	Kentucky State	Black Superman	1986	1988	3	
Tony Bishop (Import)	Power forward	Texas State		2023	2024	1	
Cris Bolado	Center	UM	Jumbo	1997	1998	2	
Franklin Bonifacio	Shooting guard	Las Positas		2016		1	
Cedric Bozeman (Import)	Small forward	UCLA		2012		1	
Jim Bradley (Import)	Center	Northern Illinois		1980		1	
Torraye Braggs (Import)	Power forward / Center	Xavier		2004		1	
Carlos Briggs (Import)	Point guard	Baylor		1989		1	
Rodney Brondial	Power forward / Center	Adamson		2014	2015	2	
Andre Brown (Import)	Center	DePaul		2005		1	
Denham Brown (Import)	Power forward	UConn		2010		1	
Ernest Brown (Import)	Center	Indian Hills CC		2008		1	
Justin Brownlee (Import)	Small forward / Power forward	St. John's	JB, Justin Noypi, Kabayan	2016; 2021; 2024	2020; 2023 present		
Nate Brumefield (Import)	Power forward	Oklahoma Baptist		2011		1	
Rick Brunson (Import)	Shooting guard	Temple		1998		1	
Paolo Bugia	Power forward	Ateneo		2009		1	
Rolando Buhay	Power forward	NCBA		1982	1986	5	

== C ==
Name	Position	School/University	Nickname	Years with Barangay Ginebra		No. of seasons	Ref.
Name	Position	School/University	Nickname	From	To	No. of seasons	Ref.
Junjun Cabatu	Power forward / Small forward	De La Salle		2008	2009	1	
Sonny Cabatu	Center / Power forward	PSBA		1992	1995	4	
Mark Caguioa	Shooting guard	Glendale CC (CA)	The Blonde Bomber, The Spark, The Furious, MC47	2001	2020	18	
Allan Caidic	Shooting guard / Small forward	UE	The Triggerman	1999		1	
Aramis Calpito	Power forward	San Sebastian	Banjo	1999	2005	6	
Niño Canaleta	Small forward / Power forward	UE	KG, The Da Vinci of Dunk	2011	2012	1	
Prince Caperal	Center / Power forward	Arellano		2018	2022	5	
Dennis Carbonilla	Power forward	Letran		1987	1988	2	
Merwin Castelo	Shooting guard	San Beda		1999	2001	3	
Reil Cervantes	Power forward	FEU	The Reil Deal	2011	2012	1	
Philip Cezar	Power forward / Center	José Rizal	The Scholar, Tapal King	1989	1991	3	
Jeff Chan	Small forward / Shooting guard	FEU	The Negros Sniper	2018	2022	5	
Benny Cheng	Small forward	Mapúa		1994	1998	5	
Gec Chia	Shooting guard / Point guard	Ateneo		2006	2008	2	
Nonoy Chuatico	Shooting guard	Ateneo		1992	1994	3	
Alex Clariño	Shooting guard / Small forward	Lyceum		1981	1985	5	
Boy Clariño	Power forward / Center	Adamson		1981		1	
Harmon Codiñera	Power forward	FEU		1987	1989	3	
Pat Codiñera	Shooting guard / Small forward	FEU		1993		1	
Fred Cofield (Import)	Shooting guard / Small forward	Eastern Michigan		1996		1	
Jervis Cole (Import)	Power forward / Center	Fresno State		1991		1	
Alex Coles (Import)	Power forward / Center	Delaware		1995		1	
Mike Cortez	Point guard / Shooting guard	De La Salle	Cool Cat	2010	2012	4	
Alex Crisano	Center	Brooklyn	The Showstopper	2000; 2003; 2007	2001; 2004; 2009	5	
Celino Cruz	Point guard	FEU		2009	2010	1	
Jervy Cruz	Power forward	UST		2015	2019	4	
Ralph Cu	Power forward / Small forward	De La Salle		2023	present		
Rey Cuenco	Power forward / Center	Gregorio Araneta		1989	1992	4	
Mike Cumberland (Import)	Power forward	Pepperdine		1998		1	

== D ==
Name	Position	School/University	Nickname	Years with Barangay Ginebra		No. of seasons	Ref.
Name	Position	School/University	Nickname	From	To	No. of seasons	Ref.
Luke Dacula	Point guard	Southwestern		1979	1980	2	
Christopher Daniels (Import)	Center / Power forward	Georgia		2010		1	
Bal David	Point guard	UST	The Flash	1995	2005	10	
Jayson David	Shooting guard / Small forward	Lyceum		2022	present		
Ben Davis (Import)	Center / Power forward	Arizona		2002		1	
Tommy Davis (Import)	Shooting guard / Small forward	Minnesota	The Bomb	1988		1	
Jericho de Guzman	Center	Benilde	The Tower Gunner	2016	2018	1	
Macdonald de Joya	Power forward	San Beda	Macky	1992	1997	6	
Ernie de Leon	Shooting guard	UE		1979		1	
Yancy de Ocampo	Center	St. Francis	YDO	2010	2011	3	
Glenn Dedmon (Import)	Center / Power forward	Southern		1998		1	
Eusebio del Rosario	Center / Power forward	UE		1979	1983	5	
Arthur dela Cruz	Small forward / Power forward	San Beda		2017	2020	3	
Bienvenido dela Cruz	Shooting guard	Mindanao		1979	1980	2	
Roehl Deles	Center / Power forward	José Rizal		1979		1	
Joe Devance	Power forward / Center	UTEP	JDV	2015–2022; 2024		7	
Yves Dignadice	Power forward	De La Salle	Adonis	1999	2000	2	
Jared Dillinger	Small forward	Hawaii	Daredevil	2019	2023	4	
Aries Dimaunahan	Point guard / Shooting guard	UST		2003	2006	3	
Rudy Distrito	Shooting guard	UE	The Destroyer	1987	1991	4	
Mario Donaldson (Import)	Small forward	Drake		1999		1	
Jacky Dorsey (Import)	Center	Georgia		1983		1	
Ed Ducut	Center	Letran		1981	1988	8	
Terry Duerod (Import)	Shooting guard	Detroit Mercy		1986		1	
Michael Dunigan (Import)	Center / Power forward	Oregon	Dum-Dum Dunigan	2015		1	

== E ==
Name	Position	School/University	Nickname	Years with Barangay Ginebra		No. of seasons	Ref.
Name	Position	School/University	Nickname	From	To	No. of seasons	Ref.
Edgar Echavez	Point guard	Misamis	Egay	2005	2007	3	
Dennis Edwards (Import)	Small forward	Fort Hays State		1997	1998	2	
Ed Elisma (Import)	Center	Georgia Tech		2005		1	
Chris Ellis	Small forward	Mary Hardin–Baylor	Air Force Ellis	2012	2017	5	
Rosell Ellis (Import)	Small forward / Power forward	McNeese State	Ro	2003	2004	2	
Brian Enriquez	Small forward / Shooting guard	William Woods		2021	2022	1	
Rudy Enterina	Shooting guard	Visayas		1993		1	
Macky Escalona	Point guard	Ateneo		2007	2009	2	
Jolly Escobar	Power forward / Center	UE		1999		1	
Elmer Espiritu	Small forward / Power forward	UE		2012	2013	1	
Sonny Estil	Small forward	Letran		2025	present		

== F ==
Name	Position	School/University	Nickname	Years with Barangay Ginebra		No. of seasons	Ref.
Name	Position	School/University	Nickname	From	To	No. of seasons	Ref.
Noynoy Falcasantos	Power forward	Cebu		2004		1	
Bryan Faundo	Center / Power forward	Letran		2013	2014	1	
E.J. Feihl	Center	Adamson		1995	1997	3	
Desmond Ferguson (Import)	Power forward	Detroit Mercy		2002		1	
Kevin Ferrer	Small forward / Power forward	UST	King Tiger	2016	2019	3	
Kalani Ferreria	Shooting guard / Point guard / Small forward	Moorpark		2005	2006	1	
John Ferriols	Power forward / Center	USJ–R		2010		1	
Ryan Fletcher (Import)	Center	Cincinnati		2000	2001	2	
James Forrester	Shooting guard / Small forward	Arellano	Air Canada, J-Flight	2013	2015	2	
Reggie Fox (Import)	Small forward	Wyoming		1996		1	
Gabe Freeman (Import)	Small forward	Mesa CC		2014		1	
Hiram Fuller (Import)	Power forward	Fresno State		2005		1	

== G ==
Name	Position	School/University	Nickname	Years with Barangay Ginebra		No. of seasons	Ref.
Name	Position	School/University	Nickname	From	To	No. of seasons	Ref.
Charles García (Import)	Power forward / Center	Seattle		2018		1	
Fernando Garcia	Small forward	Adamson	Nandy	1989		1	
Javier Garcia	Point guard	Adamson		1979	1981	3	
Paul Garcia	Shooting guard	Ateneo		2024	2025	1	
Jayvee Gayoso	Small forward / Shooting guard	Ateneo	Mr. Adrenaline	1991	1998	8	
Jarrod Gee (Import)	Center	Illinois		2002		1	
Willie Generalao	Point guard	Visayas	Little General	1980	1984	5	
Isaac Go	Center / Power forward	Ateneo		2024	present		
Dante Gonzalgo	Small forward	Lyceum	Bicolano Express	1986	1993	8	
Jeremiah Gray	Small forward / Shooting guard	Dominican (CA)		2022	present		
Keith Gray (Import)	Small forward	Detroit Mercy		1986		1	
Sylvester Gray (Import)	Power forward / Center	Memphis		1990		1	
Brian Green (Import)	Small forward	Nevada		2000 2002		2	
Donald Gumaru	Point guard	Arellano		2023	2024	1	

== H ==
Name	Position	School/University	Nickname	Years with Barangay Ginebra		No. of seasons	Ref.
Name	Position	School/University	Nickname	From	To	No. of seasons	Ref.
Michael Hackett (Import)	Power forward / Center	Jacksonville		1985	1988	4	
Roy Hammonds (Import)	Power forward	San Jose State		2000		1	
Andre Hardy (Import)	Shooting guard	Clarke		1995		1	
Paul Harris (Import)	Small forward / Power forward	Syracuse		2016		1	
Rudy Hatfield	Power forward	Michigan–Dearborn	H-Bomb	2006; 2010; 2012	2007; 2011; 2013	5	
Jayjay Helterbrand	Point guard / Shooting guard	Kentucky State	The Fast, Helter Skelter	2000; 2004	2002; 2017	16	
Joseph Herrera	Shooting guard / Small forward	Letran		1982	1985	4	
Herbert Hill (Import)	Center	Providence		2013		1	
Vince Hizon	Shooting guard	Ateneo	The Prince	1995	1998	4	
Ken Holmqvist	Center	FEU		2021		1	
Michael Holper	Power forward	San Diego State		2005	2008	4	
Stephen Holt	Shooting guard / Small forward	Saint Mary's		2024	present		
Jerald Honeycutt (Import)	Power forward	Tulane		2001		1	
Steve Hood (Import)	Small forward / Shooting guard	James Madison		1994	1996	2	
Freddie Hubalde	Small forward / Shooting guard	Mapúa		1990		1	
Paolo Hubalde	Point guard	UE		2006	2007	1	

== I ==
Name	Position	School/University	Nickname	Years with Barangay Ginebra		No. of seasons	Ref.
Name	Position	School/University	Nickname	From	To	No. of seasons	Ref.
JC Intal	Small forward	Ateneo	The Rocket	2009	2012	4	
Leo Isaac	Point guard / Shooting guard	Mapúa		1986; 1994	1991; 1995	8	

== J ==
Name	Position	School/University	Nickname	Years with Barangay Ginebra		No. of seasons	Ref.
Name	Position	School/University	Nickname	From	To	No. of seasons	Ref.
Henry James (Import)	Power forward	St. Mary's (Texas)		1996		1	
Jammer Jamito	Power forward	St. Clare	The Jammer	2016	2018	2	
Pido Jarencio	Point guard / Shooting guard	UST	The Fireman	1992	1998	6	
Robert Jaworski	Point guard	UE	Sonny, The Living Legend, Big-J	1984	1998	14	
Robert Jaworski Jr.	Shooting guard / Small forward	Ateneo	Dodot	1995	1998	4	
Othyus Jeffers (Import)	Small forward	Robert Morris		2016		1	
Keith Jensen	Small forward	NYU		2012	2013	2	
Orlando Johnson (Import)	Small forward	UC Santa Barbara		2015		1	
Rob Johnson	Point guard	Bellevue		2003	2004	1	
Danny Jones (Import)	Power forward	Wisconsin		1992		1	
Mark Jones (Import)	Small forward	Central Florida		2001		1	
Bobby Jose	Power forward	UST	The Firecracker	1993	1994	2	

== K ==
Name	Position	School/University	Nickname	Years with Barangay Ginebra		No. of seasons	Ref.
Name	Position	School/University	Nickname	From	To	No. of seasons	Ref.
Kim Jiwan (Asian Import)	Shooting guard	Yonsei		2015		1	
Chris King (Import)	Power forward	Wake Forest		1997	1999	3	
Jens Knuttel	Point guard	FEU		2014		1	
Doug Kramer	Power forward / Center	Ateneo		2009	2010	2	

== L ==
Name	Position	School/University	Nickname	Years with Barangay Ginebra		No. of seasons	Ref.
Name	Position	School/University	Nickname	From	To	No. of seasons	Ref.
Robert Labagala	Point guard	UE	Little Robbie	2010	2013	2	
Elmer Lago	Shooting guard / Small forward	De La Salle		1999	2001	3	
Sean Lampley (Import)	Power forward / Small forward	California		2005		1	
Chico Lanete	Point guard	Lyceum	Chico Balboa	2009		1	
Gilbert Lao	Center / Power forward	UST		2007	2008	1	
Jun Limpot	Power forward / Center	De La Salle	The Main Man	2000	2003	4	
Noli Locsin	Power forward	De La Salle	The Tank	1994	1998	5	
Dior Lowhorn (Import)	Power forward / Center	San Francisco		2013		1	
Chito Loyzaga	Power forward / Small forward	San Beda	Dynamite - original before Danny Seigle	1986	1993	8	
Joey Loyzaga	Shooting guard / Small forward	Arellano		1986	1990	5	

== M ==
Name	Position	School/University	Nickname	Years with Barangay Ginebra		No. of seasons	Ref.
Name	Position	School/University	Nickname	From	To	No. of seasons	Ref.
Mark Macapagal	Shooting guard / Small forward	San Sebastian		2005	2008	3	
Toney Mack (Import)	Power forward / Center	Georgia		1990		1	
Vernon Macklin (Import)	Center	Florida	V-Mac	2013		1	
Antonio Madison (Import)	Shooting guard	New Orleans		1995		1	
Ronald Magtulis	Small forward	FEU		1999	2003	4	
Rico Maierhofer	Power forward	De La Salle	The Kite, Rico Mambo	2011	2013	2	
Gilbert Malabanan	Small forward	Perpetual		2002	2003	2	
Allein Maliksi	Small forward / Shooting guard	UST		2011	2012	2	
Ricafort Mallari	Shooting guard	UE	Ric	1979		1	
Jamie Malonzo	Small forward / Power forward	De La Salle		2022	2025	3	
Billy Mamaril	Center / Power forward	Bakersfield	Big Mama	2006; 2010	2010; 2015	9	
Romulo Mamaril	Center	Mapúa	The Human Beanpole	1984; 1986	1988; 1990	6	
Jett Manuel	Shooting guard	UP		2018		1	
Dave Marcelo	Center	San Beda	Dave Gwapo	2015	2017	3	
Aljon Mariano	Small forward / Power forward	UST	Hulkbuster	2015	2025	9	
Joey Marquez	Small forward / Shooting guard	AUF		1984	1986	3	
Chito Martin	Center / Power forward	José Rizal		1979	1980	2	
Jun Marzan	Shooting guard / Small forward	Baguio		1994		1	
Z. Mason (Import)	Power forward	Chattanooga		2013		1	
Lew Massey (Import)	Small forward / Shooting guard	North Carolina		1982	1983	2	
Tony Massop (import)	Center / Power forward	Kansas State		1993		1	
Wes Matthews (Import)	Shooting guard	Wisconsin		1991		1	
Vergel Meneses	Shooting guard / Small forward	José Rizal	The Aerial Voyager	1999	2002	4	
Eric Menk	Power forward / Center	Lake Superior State	Major Pain	2002	2012	10	
Sol Mercado	Shooting guard / Point guard / Small forward	Biola	Sol-Train	2015	2019	5	
Willie Miller	Shooting guard / Point guard	Letran	The Thriller	2010	2011	2	
Silas Mills (Import)	Power forward	Utah State		2002		1	
Emman Monfort	Point guard	Ateneo	The Minion	2013	2015	2	
Isaiah Morris (Import)	Power forward / Center	Arkansas		1995		1	
Benjamin Muhammad (Import)	Power forward / Center	NC State		1993		1	
David Murrell	Small forward	UP		2024		1	

== N ==
Name	Position	School/University	Nickname	Years with Barangay Ginebra		No. of seasons	Ref.
Name	Position	School/University	Nickname	From	To	No. of seasons	Ref.
Edward Naron	Shooting guard	Visayas		1999	2000	2	
Rod Nealy (Import)	Small forward / Power forward	Houston Christian	Hot Rod	2007 2009		2	
Miguel Noble	Power forward	Utica	Migs	2004	2005	1	
David Noel (Import)	Power forward / Small forward	North Carolina		2009		1	

== O ==
Name	Position	School/University	Nickname	Years with Barangay Ginebra		No. of seasons	Ref.
Name	Position	School/University	Nickname	From	To	No. of seasons	Ref.
Wilmer Ong	Power forward / Center	St. La Salle		1994	2002	9	
Sidney Onwubere	Power forward	EAC		2021	2024	3	
Mike Orquillas	Shooting guard	Cebu		1996	1997	2	

== P ==
Name	Position	School/University	Nickname	Years with Barangay Ginebra		No. of seasons	Ref.
Name	Position	School/University	Nickname	From	To	No. of seasons	Ref.
Victor Pablo	Power forward / Small forward	FEU	The Conqueror	2007	2008	1	
Chris Pacana	Point guard / Shooting guard	St. Francis		2007	2009	2	
Bennett Palad	Shooting guard / Small forward	UST		1991	1993	3	
Bobby Parks	Small forward / Shooting guard	Memphis		1988		1	
Kenny Payne (Import)	Power forward	Louisville		1998		1	
Dorian Peña	Center	Coppin State	Junkyard Dawg	2015		1	
Reynaldo Perez	Shooting guard / Small forward	Mapúa		1985	1986	2	
Von Pessumal	Shooting guard / Small forward	Ateneo	Vonfire, Tressumal	2022	2025	3	
John Pinto	Point guard / Shooting guard	Arellano	Nards	2022	present		
Marlon Piodo	Power forward	USJ–R		2001	2002	2	
Anthony Poblador	Center	De La Salle		1991	1992	2	
Chris Porter (Import)	Center	Auburn		2005	2006	1	
Josh Powell (Import)	Center / Power forward	NC State		2014		1	
Ricky Price (Import)	Small forward	Duke		2003		1	
Stanley Pringle	Shooting guard / Small forward	Penn State	Stan The Man	2019	2024	5	
Darryl Prue (Import)	Power forward	West Virginia		1995		1	

== Q ==
Name	Position	School/University	Nickname	Years with Barangay Ginebra		No. of seasons	Ref.
Name	Position	School/University	Nickname	From	To	No. of seasons	Ref.
Daren Queenan (Import)	Small forward	Lehigh		1989		1	

== R ==
Name	Position	School/University	Nickname	Years with Barangay Ginebra		No. of seasons	Ref.
Name	Position	School/University	Nickname	From	To	No. of seasons	Ref.
Manny Ramos	Center	De La Salle		2005	2006	1	
Kerby Raymundo	Power forward / Center	Letran	The Kid	2012	2013	2	
Rafi Reavis	Center / Power forward	Coppin State		2006	2009	3	
Ricky Relosa	Power forward / Center	Mapúa	Bruise Brother	1985		1	
Jay-R Reyes	Power forward / Center	UP		2013	2015	2	
Norberto Rivera	Shooting guard / Small forward	San Sebastian	Norby	1979	1981	3	
Dennis Roldan	Shooting guard	Trinity		1983		1	
Anthony Roberts (Import)	Power forward	Oral Roberts		1983		1	
Leon Rodgers (Import)	Small forward	Northern Illinois		2014		1	
Eric Rodriguez	Power forward	Letran		2011		1	
Porfirio Rodriguez	Power forward		Pong	1979	1980	2	
Ulysses Rodriguez	Small forward	José Rizal	Uly	1979		1	
Troy Rosario	Power forward / Center	NU		2024	present		
Derek Rucker (Import)	Shooting guard	Davidson		1996		1	

== S ==
Name	Position	School/University	Nickname	Years with Barangay Ginebra		No. of seasons	Ref.
Name	Position	School/University	Nickname	From	To	No. of seasons	Ref.
Kent Salado	Point guard	Arellano		2020	2022	3	
Allan Salangsang	Power forward	Letran		2006		1	
Cayetano Salazar	Center	Letran	The Tall Man, Tano	1988	1989	2	
Terry Saldaña	Power forward / Center	UST	Plasticman	1983 1997	1987 1998	6	
Nico Salva	Small forward	Ateneo		2015	2016	1	
Sunday Salvacion	Small forward	Benilde	Sunday Special	2003	2010	7	
Jeffrey Sanders	Small forward	TIP		2003		1	
Rodney Santos	Shooting guard / Small forward / Point guard	San Sebastian	The Slasher	2004	2008	4	
Julian Sargent	Small forward / Shooting guard	De La Salle		2019		1	
Homer Se	Power forward / Center	San Sebastian		2009		1	
Andy Seigle	Center	New Orleans	Eagle	2004	2007	3	
Greg Slaughter	Center	Ateneo	Gregzilla	2013	2020	7	
Donald Sloan (Import)	Shooting guard / Point guard	Texas A&M		2011		1	
Stevenson Solomon	Power forward / Center	San Sebastian	Bong	1995		1	
Ervin Sotto	Center / Power forward	St. Francis		2005	2006	1	
Isaac Spencer (Import)	Power forward	Murray State		2002		1	
Christian Standhardinger	Center / Power forward	Hawaii	C-Stan, The Bulldozer	2021	2024	3	
Curtis Stinson (Import)	Point guard	Iowa State		2011		1	
Awvee Storey (Import)	Power forward	Arizona State		2010		1	
Wayman Strickland (Import)	Shooting guard	San Diego		1996		1	

== T ==
Name	Position	School/University	Nickname	Years with Barangay Ginebra		No. of seasons	Ref.
Name	Position	School/University	Nickname	From	To	No. of seasons	Ref.
Paolo Taha	Shooting guard / Small forward	Benilde		2016	2018	2	
Yousef Taha	Center	Mapúa		2012	2013	1	
Wilfredo Tanduyan	Point guard	Southwestern	Willy	1979	1980	2	
LA Tenorio	Point guard	Ateneo	Teniente, GINeral, Ironman	2012	2025	12	
Teytey Teodoro	Point guard / Shooting guard	José Rizal		2019		1	
Scottie Thompson	Shooting guard / Point guard	Perpetual	The Pearl, The Hustle Man, ST6, ST9	2015	present		
Arvin Tolentino	Small forward / Power forward	FEU		2020	2022	3	
Chester Tolomia	Shooting guard / Small forward	Perpetual	Elevator	2002	2003	2	
Armando Torres	Shooting guard	FEATI		1979	1981	3	
Norbert Torres	Center / Power forward	De La Salle	The Bear	2025	present		
Arnie Tuadles	Small forward	Visayas		1985		1	
Ronald Tubid	Shooting guard / Small forward	UE	The Saint, The Fearless	2007	2012	6	
Sanchir Tungalag (Asian Import)	Small forward / Shooting guard	Otgontenger		2015		1	
Rahshon Turner (Import)	Center	Fairleigh Dickinson		2008		1	

== U ==
Name	Position	School/University	Nickname	Years with Barangay Ginebra		No. of seasons	Ref.
Name	Position	School/University	Nickname	From	To	No. of seasons	Ref.
Josh Urbiztondo	Point guard	Fresno Pacific	The Fireball	2013	2015	3	

== V ==
Name	Position	School/University	Nickname	Years with Barangay Ginebra		No. of seasons	Ref.
Name	Position	School/University	Nickname	From	To	No. of seasons	Ref.
Junthy Valenzuela	Shooting guard / Small forward	SCSIT	The Hitman	2008	2010	3	
Kim Valenzuela	Point guard	San Francisco State		2004		1	
Teodoro Valera	Small forward	UST	Bong	1999		1	
Manny Victorino	Center / Power forward	José Rizal		1993		1	
Dennice Villamor	Power forward / Small forward	NU		2015	2016	1	
Hilario Villanil	Power forward	USPF	Larry	1990	1992	3	
Enrico Villanueva	Center / Power forward	Ateneo	The Raging Bull	2009	2010	3	
Jackson Vroman (Import)	Center	Iowa State		2012		1	

== W ==
Name	Position	School/University	Nickname	Years with Barangay Ginebra		No. of seasons	Ref.
Name	Position	School/University	Nickname	From	To	No. of seasons	Ref.
Jamie Waller (Import)	Small forward	Virginia Union		1988 1992		2	
James Walkvist	Center			2002 2004–2005		2	
Joe Ward (Import)	Power forward / Center	Georgia		1988		1	
Tony Washam Sr. (Import)	Power forward	West Virginia		1984		1	
Steve Watson	Small forward	Ateneo		1983	1985	3	
Bubba Wells (Import)	Small forward	Austin Peay		2001	2002	2	
DeWayne Wesley (Import)	Shooting guard	New Orleans		1998		1	
Frank Western (Import)	Small forward	Providence		1998		1	
Clinton Wheeler (Import)	Point guard	William Paterson		1986		1	
Kevin White	Point guard	West Hills		2009	2010	1	
Mitchell Wiggins (Import)	Small forward	Florida State		1994		1	
John Wilson	Shooting guard / Small forward	José Rizal		2010	2012	3	
Monty Wilson (Import)	Small forward	Tennessee State		1999		1	
Willy Wilson	Power forward	De La Salle		2008	2013	6	
Joe Wylie (Import)	Power forward / Center	Miami		1998		1	

== Y ==
Name	Position	School/University	Nickname	Years with Barangay Ginebra		No. of seasons	Ref.
Name	Position	School/University	Nickname	From	To	No. of seasons	Ref.
Joseph Yeo	Shooting guard	De La Salle	The Ninja	2014	2015	1	
Tonichi Yturri	Center	De La Salle		1992		1	
