= Scary Stories for Young Foxes =

2019 children's novel

- Author: Christian McKay Heidicker
- Illustrator: Junyi Wu
- Language: English
- Publisher: Henry Holt
- Publication date: July 30, 2019
- Publication place: United States
- Pages: 320
- Awards: Newbery Honor
- ISBN: 978-1-250-18142-8
- Followed by: Scary Stories for Young Foxes: The City

Scary Stories for Young Foxes is a 2019 children's book written by Christian McKay Heidicker, with illustrations by Junyi Wu. The book, published by Henry Holt and Company, was first envisioned to be similar to some of the Berenstain Bears' scary stories, but was rewritten into a collection of tales based on classic horror stories.

The novel consists of several connected stories told by an old vixen as cautionary tales to a new generation of kits. The stories are focused on Mia and Uly, two foxes from different dens, separated from their families and having to fend themselves against the dangers that lie in the forest, such as predators, humans and other foxes.

Scary Stories for Young Foxes was well received by critics, with Heidicker praised for his skill in creating interesting characters and dark stories, while Wu's drawings were highlighted by reviewers for their style and importance in helping create a scary atmosphere. The book was the recipient of a Newbery Honor in 2020 and was featured in "best of" lists by the ALA and The Booklist. A sequel, called Scary Stories for Young Foxes: The City, was released on August 31, 2021.

== Plot ==
The book follows seven fox kits in search of scary stories. Their mother tells them about an old storyteller but prohibits them from adventuring there. Despite the warnings, they go there to listen to the old vixen's tales. The first one is focused on Mia, who is being taught survival skills alongside the rest of the litter. During their class, their teacher, Miss Vix, suffering from rabies, becomes aggressive and attacks the fox kits. In the aftermath, only Mia and her mother are not infected, and so they flee from their den. The elder then tells Uly's story, a fox born with a malformed front leg and ostracized by his six sisters, who mock him whenever possible. One day, Uly's father, Wynn, returns to the den and tries to force Uly's mother to kill him. She refuses and Uly runs away and jumps off a cliff then disappears into the forest.

Meanwhile, lost in the forest, Mia's mother steps on a steel trap and is almost captured, but Mia saves her and is captured instead. Mia is brought by the hunter, Beatrix Potter, to her house, where she remains caged for several days. After attempting to escape, Mia is strung on a rope and is soon found by Uly, who had felt the smell of food from nearby. Uly helps Mia escape and they run away. The two kits become friends and decide to go after Mia's mother. They first go through a swamp where Uly is attacked by an alligator. He manages to free himself but loses his malformed limb in the process.

The two foxes are forced to go through the domain of Uly's father, where his mother was as well. After faking his death, Uly and Mia trick Wynn into believing he is being haunted, and so he disappears. They continue on their journey to find Mia's mother, while Uly's mother returns to their den. Winter arrives and the pair finds a litter of fox kits without a mother. While taking care of them, they are attacked by Mia's brother, who is suffering from rabies, and Wynn. Mia's brother is killed by Wynn, who in turn is thrown into the river by Uly.

At the end of each tale told by the old vixen, a fox gets scared and goes back to their den. In the end, only one kit remains, and she explains it was due to her name also being Mia. The fox kit explains that every new generation a fox receives that name to honor a fox called Mia, who saved one of her ancestors from a trap many years ago. After the kit is called home by her mother, the storyteller is revealed to have been the original Mia all along, and Uly is revealed to still be alive as well, having survived and followed the river over the course of several months. As they retire to their den, Mia takes comfort in the fact that the kits know her stories and will pass them down to the next generation.

== Major themes ==
The stories told by the old vixen are meant to serve as cautionary tales to the next generation, with aspects of fairy story morality. One of the first concepts explored by Heidicker in his book is that of "domestic horror", both from the perspective of Mia and Uly. While Uly is constantly bullied by his sisters due to his disability, Mia is attacked by her teacher, who had gone rabid and is forced to abandon the rest of her family.

Wynn is Uly's abusive father, who wants him dead because of the way he was born, and attacks Uly on multiple occasions. Wynn can represent not only domestic horror, but also toxic masculinity. Wynn is depicted not only as physically abusive, but also emotionally; he is shown in one of the chapters attempting to groom Mia so she joins the other vixens of his den.

== Style ==
Scary Stories for Young Foxes is a horror novel and has been compared to Scary Stories to Tell in the Dark in style, as well as to Adam Gidwitz's A Tale Dark and Grimm. In her analysis of Heidicker's novel, Elizabeth Bird mentions the writer's ability "to render the banal horrible". To mimic someone telling a scary story, Heidicker utilizes onomatopoeias, which "plays into the overall aesthetic of the book."

Throughout the book, Heidicker stops the old vixen's narration and moves the focus to the fox kits who are listening to the stories. These breaks are used to build up the suspense and to give the audience a moment to relax from the moments of terror. These brief pauses also have the effect of increasing the tension and, alongside Heidicker's "vivid descriptions of blood and viscera," they create "a careful balance of horror and suspense".

The novel is also accompanied by Junyi Wu's illustrations, which are characterized as "unsettling", "intricate", and "haunting". Wu's drawings work alongside the writing to help set an atmosphere of horror.

== Background ==
When writing the first version of Scary Stories for Young Foxes, Heidicker set out to create a retelling to some of the old Berenstain Bears scary stories, such as "The Spooky Old Tree" and "Bears in the Night", with the main difference being that his story was more brutal. At the time, since he hadn't been published yet and didn't know what were the accepted limits of middle grade horror stories, Heidicker also looked for inspiration in stories by Neil Gaiman, Miggery Sow and Gidwitz.

Later, under the advice of his agent, John M. Cusick, Heidicker changed the story so that it would have "no anthropomorphized characters". Initially, the characters in the story lived in a civilized society, which included wearing clothes and going to the store to buy food. After following the advice, Heidicker redesigned the foxes to be more realistic. He also focused on all the tales having a parallel to classic horror stories but seen through the eyes of a fox.

Cusick had also advised against publishing a short story collection, especially one of scary stories, so Heidicker changed it so they would be connected and form a complete novel, while also "add[ing] a snuggle for every snarl."

The illustrations in the book were done by Junyi Wu, and were inspired partially by Stephen Gammell's art, present in the classic Scary Stories to Tell in the Dark. To Heidicker, the stories themselves were only scary due, in part, to those illustrations. Wu's illustrations, which are mostly black and white, have been described as being created with charcoal or graphite.

== Reception and awards ==
Scary Stories for Young Foxes was viewed positively by critics. Kirkus Reviews found the horror stories present in the book to "border on downright disturbing", also calling them "[d]ark and skillfully distressing," although they criticized the initial prose, due to its overuse of adjectives and its "slightly ornate descriptions". The Wall Street Journal called the story "clever and harrowing", and noted the usage of white letters in black paper for the introduction as a way to draw in the readers. A review published by The Buffalo News comments on Heidicker's choice to use a realistic approach to the animal characters, and praises how vivid and "truly terrifying" the dangers the characters go through are.

Publishers Weekly's review calls the novel a "inventive middle-grade debut by Heidicker." They comment on the pacing of the stories, and how Heidicker "offers distance from the bleakness" through his writing. Another review notes how the author, despite avoiding "'adult' themes of horror", still manages to create "dark, scary, and impactful" stories.

Writing for The Booklist, Julia Smith praised the author's ability to transition from a young adult novel to a children's book. Smith also commented on the use of black-and-white illustrations, as well as the pauses in the scary stories by the older fox, saying they "effectively [build] suspense and [provide] momentary relief for the storyteller's audience." Similarly, Kate Quealy-Gainer, reviewing for the Bulletin of the Center for Children's Books, called attention to Junyi Wu's drawings, which use "charcoal shading and negative space to create a haunting style".

Hediciker's book was a Newbery Honor in 2020. Scary Stories for Young Foxes was also in The Booklist's Editor Choice for 2019 and got featured on American Library Association's list of the best books for 2020. Krishna Grady, a member of the 2020 Newbery Award Selection Committee, in a profile of the year's Honor and Award books, said Heidicker was able to create a scary story "masterfully with lush imagery and intriguing characters." Fellow committee member Eileen Makoff added that the author "makes the woods come alive".

== Sequel ==
A companion book called Scary Stories for Young Foxes: The City was announced to be published on 31 August 2021. The story is set several years after the original, with a different group of main characters, this time facing dangers in an urban setting. While the first book is a retelling of old scary stories, the second one is a retelling of modern ones. The draft for The City was completed before the release of the original book, and was planned originally to be released alongside as the second half of Scary Stories for Young Foxes. After receiving the Newbery Honor, Heidicker went back to working on the draft and rewrote it multiple times.

The sequel was similarly praised by critics, with Kirkus Reviews calling it a "worthy follow-up," and The Booklist saying it's "[a] frightfully accomplished companion novel that stands on its own."

== Adaptation ==
In April 2021, it was announced that Lena Headey's company, Peephole Productions, and Boat Rocker Studios would co-produce a miniseries based on Heidicker's book.
