= Nominees in the 2007 Philippine House of Representatives party-list election =

The following are the nominees in the 2007 Philippine House of Representatives party-list election.

As ordered by the Supreme Court of the Philippines in Bantay Republic Act or BA-RA 7941 vs. COMELEC (G.R. No. 177271), the Commission on Elections released the names of party-list nominees in the 2007 election on May 4, 2007.

Winning party-lists and their elected nominees are in bold.

== Nominees ==
- **1-United Transport Koalisyon (1-UTAK)**
  1. **Vigor Maria Mendoza**
  2. Homero Mercado
  3. Zenaida de Castro
  4. Efren de Luna
  5. Ryan Benjamin Yu
- AA-Kasosyo Party (AA-Kasosyo)
  1. Dionisio Magpantay
  2. Felix Brawner Jr.
  3. Caridad Delgado
  4. Luis Casimiro
  5. Alberto Ong Jr.
  6. Francis Afulugencia
- **Aangat Tayo (AT)**
  1. **Daryl Grace Abayon**
  2. Eden Rivera
  3. Meriam Paylaga
  4. Jean Bautista
  5. Dannelyn Letran
- **Abakada Guro (Abakada)**
  1. **Jonathan dela Cruz**
  2. Samson Alcantara
  3. Cecilia Dy
  4. Jose Crisologo
  5. Jerry Alfonso
- Abanse! Pinay
  1. Teresa Fernandez
  2. Kalayaan Pulido-Constantino
  3. Yasmin Lao
  4. Rebecca Tanada
  5. Isabelita Constantino
  6. Lucia Evelina Melecio-Tan
  7. Paulina Nayra
  8. Marry Ann Duran-Dino
- Abante Ilonggo (Aba Ilonggo)
  1. Aguinaldo Miravalles
  2. Arturo Mejorada
  3. Robert Doromal
  4. Anecito Magbato
  5. Rogelio Setubal
- **Abono**
  1. **Robert Raymond Estrella**
  2. **Francisco Ortega III**
  3. Ramon Morden
  4. Rosendo So
  5. Fa Almasan
- Action for Democracy and Development - Tribal People (ADD-Tribal)
  1. Abdurahman Amin
  2. Nejemah Mokiin Malna
  3. Datu Tayam Sangki
  4. Hasan Alam
  5. John Albert Cerveza
- Action for Dynamic Development (ADD)
- **Action for Teacher Empowerment Through Action, Cooperation and Harmony Towards Educational Reforms (A Teacher)**
  1. **Mariano Piamonte Jr.**
  2. **Ulpiano Sarmiento III**
  3. Carolina Porio
  4. Nenita Habulan
  5. Julieta Cortuna
- Advocates for Special Children and the Handicapped Movement (Asahan Mo)
  1. Oscar Yabes
  2. David Jonathan Yap
  3. Lino Ong
  4. Jose Lipa Jr.
  5. Voltaire Mauricio
- Agbiag! Timpuyog Ilocano (Agbiag)
  1. Marcelo Farinas II
  2. Samuel Tomas
  3. Rogelio Mendoza
  4. Ruth Joy Guinid
  5. Alex Manalo
- Aging Pilipino Organization (Aging Pinoy)
  1. Edwin Lisondra
  2. Ernesto Camaino
  3. Rosalinda Dacanay
  4. Alma Lood
  5. Esther Sales
- **Agricultural Sector Alliance of the Philippines (AGAP)**
  1. **Nicanor Briones**
  2. **Cesar Cobrador**
  3. Rico Geron
  4. Albert Roque Lim
  5. Victorino Michael Lescano
- Ahon Pinoy (Ahon)
  1. Dante Francis Ang II
  2. Bernardo Ople
  3. Ernesto Herrera III
  4. Alfredo de la Rosa
  5. Ricardo Arevalo
- Ahonbayan
  1. Edgar Catarongan
  2. Edgardo Manda
  3. Raden Sakaluran
  4. Antonio Mariano Almeda
  5. Erlindo Modar
- Akbay Pinoy OFW - National (APOI)
  1. Melchor Rosales
  2. Floyd Feraren
  3. Adelaida Lazaro
  4. Alexander Galura
  5. Zenaida Toledo
- **Akbayan Citizens' Action Party (Akbayan)**
  1. **Risa Hontiveros** (incumbent)
  2. **Walden Bello**
  3. Enrico Dayanghirang
  4. Byron Bocar
  5. Vicente Fabe
- Aksyon Sambayanan (AKSA)
  1. Elizabeth Angsioco
  2. Timteo Aranjuez
  3. Mao Andong Jr.
  4. Fernando Gana
  5. Donna Antoinette Casio
  6. Hadji Balajadia
- **Alagad**
  - First list:
    1. **Rodante Marcoleta** (incumbent)
    2. Alberto Malvar
    3. Sergio Manzana
    4. Renato Cabling
    5. Miguelito Bajas
  - Second list:
    1. **Diogenes Osabel**
    2. Julian Mislang Jr.
    3. Ric Domingo
    4. Henry Asistin
    5. Hermenegildo Encierto Jr.
- Alay sa Bayan ng Malayang Propesyonal at Repormang Kalakal (Abay Parak)
  1. Nilo Geonzon
  2. Datu Michael Kida
  3. Virgilio Acabal
  4. Mervin Natalicio
  5. Nilo Quiros
- Alliance for Barangay Concerns (ABC)
  1. Rafaelito Villavicencio
  2. Josephine Herrera
  3. Jovita Tuela Ouano
  4. Emmanuel Thomas Neria
- **Alliance for Nationalism and Democracy (ANAD)**
  1. **Pastor Alcover Jr.**
  2. Ruben Platon
  3. David Odilao Jr.
  4. Provo Antipasado Jr.
  5. Domingo Balang
- Alliance of Associations of Accredited Workers in the Water Sector (AAWAS)
  1. Ranulfo Feliciano
  2. Isidro Lapuz
  3. Lope Santos III
  4. Ranulfo Verian
  5. Ascencion Fonte Jr.
- Alliance of Neo-Conservatives (ANC)
  1. Gamaliel Cordoba
  2. Quirino dela Torre
  3. Emilio Cayadona
  4. Manuel Reyes Jr.
  5. Rene de Assis Jr.
- Alliance of People's Organization (APO)
  1. Oscar Marmeto
  2. Val Adriano Guevara
  3. Remigio Agustin
  4. Allan Maasir
  5. Cesar Palma
- **Alliance for Rural Concerns (ARC)**
  1. **Narciso Santiago III**
  2. **Oscar Francisco**
  3. Kashmir Leyretana
  4. Basilio Propongo
  5. Isidro Suedad
- Alliance of Vendors & Traders of the Phils. (Vendors)
  1. Yussu Macalangcom
  2. Naguib Munder
  3. Saidamen Tabao
  4. Hilda Sacay-Clave
  5. Narciso Quiogue
- Alliance of Volunteer Educators (AVE)
  1. Eulogio Magsaysay (incumbent)
  2. Jose Baesa
  3. Adelaida Magsaysay
  4. Percival Macapagal
  5. Aladino Leccio
- Alliance Transport Sector (ATS)
  1. Jaime Domdom
  2. Sarcawi Nasser
  3. Leopoldo Villarena
  4. Floro Arceta
  5. Benjamin Rubio
- Alyansa ng Mamamayang Naghihirap (Almana)
  1. Honesto Cueva
  2. Ernesto Arellano
  3. Eduardo Landayan
  4. Lourdes Gula
  5. Mario Aguirre
- Alyansa ng May Kapansanang Pinoy (Akapin)
  1. Oscar Taleon
  2. Teofilo dela Cruz
  3. Jonathan Capanas
  4. Marlon Advincula
  5. Carmen Zubiage
- Alyansa ng mga Grupong Haligi ng Agham at Teknolohiya para sa Mamamayan (AGHAM)
  1. Emil Javier
  2. Saeed Sarapio Daof
  3. Angel Alcala
  4. Mario Movillon
  5. Ruben Gamala
- Alyansa ng Sambayan para sa Pagbabago (ASAP)
  1. Voltaire Francisco Banzon
  2. Roy Mahinay Sr.
  3. Carlito Cubelo
  4. Anthony Francisco
  5. Leonora Protacio
  6. Amado Domingo
- **Alyansang Bayanihan ng Magsasaka, Manggagawang Bukid at Mangingisda-Adhikain at Kilusan ng Ordinaryong Tao (ABA-AKO)**
  1. **Leonardo Montemayor**
  2. Dioscoro Granada
  3. Manuel Arejola
  4. Percival Chavez
  5. Bernadette Lingo
  6. Rene Bullecer
- An Waray
  1. **Bem Noel** (incumbent)
  2. **Neil Benedict Montejo**
  3. Michelle Mendiola
  4. Jason Alve
  5. Ranilo Maat
- **Anak Mindanao (AMIN)**
  1. **Mujiv Hataman** (incumbent)
  2. **Ariel Hernandez**
  3. Arnel Arbison
  4. Erlinda Senturias
  5. Quini Gine Areola
- **Anakpawis**
  1. **Crispin Beltran** (incumbent)
  2. Rafael V. Mariano (incumbent)
  3. **Joel Maglunsod**
  4. Fernando Hicap
  5. Ferdinand Gaite
  6. —
  7. Jaime Paglinawan
  8. Orly Marcellana
  9. Joselito Ustarez
  10. Wilfredo Marbella
  11. Jose Roy Velez
  12. Nicolas Galia
  13. Carmen Buena
  14. Jacinto Tanduyan
  15. Medardo Roda
- Ang Bagong Bayan na Nagtataguyod ng Demokratikong Ideolohiya at Layunin (Bandila)
  1. Luth Myr Teoxon
  2. Lucas Managuelod
  3. Benasing Macarambon III
  4. Alexander Mañalac
  5. Gilberto Ricafort
- Ang Galing Pinoy (AG)
  1. Bernardo Corella Jr.
  2. Ronnie Remedios
  3. Leborio Jangao Jr.
  4. Bai H. Laila Abbas
  5. Enrique Atanacio
- **Ang Laban ng Indiginong Filipino (ALIF)**
  1. **Acmad Tomawis** (incumbent)
  2. Aissah Tomawis
  3. Raima Macalandong Cali
  4. Jamela Tomawis
  5. Gamal Tomawis
- Ang Samahan ng mga Mangangalakal para sa Ikauunlad ng Lokal na Ekonomiya (A Smile)
  1. Eduardo Ma. Santos
  2. Ronald Francisco Lim
  3. Anthony Dequiña
  4. Jaime Napoles
  5. Manuel Jarmin
- Angat Antas Kabuhayan Pilipino Movement (Aangat Ka Pilipino)
  1. Eduardo Morales
  2. Nasser Halipa
  3. Solomon Canoy
  4. Ephraim Advincula
  5. Elias Beltran
- Angat Ating Kabuhayan Pilipinas (ANAK)
  1. Eduardo Octaviano Jr.
  2. Delfin Genio Jr.
  3. Kenneth Gatchalian
  4. Ramon Morillo
  5. Marcelo Sigue
- **Arts Business and Science Professionals (ABS)**
  1. **Catalina Leonen-Pizarro**
  2. Eugene Michael de Vera
  3. Catalino Lanting
  4. Yolanda Aguilar
  5. Mary Jazul
  6. Justino Vladez
- Asosasyon ng mga Maliliit na Negosyanteng Gumaganap (AMANG)
  1. Marcelino Arias
  2. Giovanni Melgar
  3. Enrique Fajardo
  4. Agustin Abella
  5. Isagani Calderon
- Assalam Bangsamoro People's Party (Assalam)
  1. Datu Pendatun Disimban
  2. Bai Sittie Zohora Montañer
  3. Jolly Lais
  4. Anwat Tucar Rasul
  5. Abdulrakman Ampatuan
- Association of Administrators, Professional and Seniors (AAPS)
  1. Edna Azurin
  2. Joseph Logronio
  3. Rene Azurin
  4. Josefina San Juan
  5. Felicisima Teodoro
- **Association of Philippine Electric Cooperatives (APEC)**
  1. **Edgar Valdez** (incumbent)
  2. **Ernesto Pablo** (incumbent)
  3. Sunny Rose Madamba (incumbent)
  4. Mariano Corvera Jr.
  5. Ponciano Payuyo
  6. Lamberto Canlas
- Babae para sa Kaunlaran (Babae Ka)
  1. Rosalinda Dagami
  2. Ruth Vasquez
  3. Maria Corazon Tumang
  4. Aida Cristina Sunga
  5. Ma. Luisa Lantin
- Bago National Cultural Society of the Philippines (Bago)
  1. Alexander Bistoyong
  2. Perfecto Litap
  3. Rudolfo Lockey
  4. Inocencio Carganilla
  5. George Banayos
- Bagong Alyansang Tagapagtaguyod ng Adhikaing Sambayanan (BATAS)
  1. Daniel Razon
  2. Melanio Mauricio Jr.
  3. Jay Sonza
  4. Ariel Pacis
  5. Olivia Coo
- Bagong Tao Movement (BTM)
  1. Arthur Alvin Aguilar
  2. Mignon Fernando
  3. Armando Escanto
  4. Norman Vincent Bungubung
  5. Richard Reverente
- Bahandi sa Kaumahan'ug Kadagatan (Bahandi)
  1. Ali Sangki
  2. Eduard Trinidad
  3. Jose Agduma
  4. Esteban Salinas
  5. Julio Bincay
- **Barangay Association for National Advancement and Transparency (BANAT)**
  1. **Salvador Britanico**
  2. Raul Lambino
  3. Joel Mendez
  4. Ricardo San Juan Jr.
  5. Rodolfo Zalazar
- **Bayan Muna**
  1. **Satur Ocampo** (incumbent)
  2. **Teodoro Casiño** (incumbent)
  3. **Neri Colmenares**
  4. Elpidio Pulmano
  5. Alfonso Cinco IV
  6. Siegfred Deduro
  7. Roman Polintan
  8. Bayani Cabronero
  9. Hope Hervilla
  10. Cynthia Lumbera
  11. Joven Laura
- Bigkis Pinoy Movement (Bigkis)
  1. Sheryl See
  2. Johnny Tan
  3. Carlos Bathan
  4. Mario Cornista
- Biyaheng Pinoy (BP)
  1. Jesus Cruz
  2. Arsenio Abalos
  3. Mary Rose Magsaysay-Crisostomo
  4. Danilo Cagas
  5. Muamar Abudurahim Akbar
- Biyayang Bukid
  1. Teofilo Villamar
  2. John Erwin Teodoro
  3. Teodoro Montoro
  4. Arsenio Esteras Jr.
  5. Albino Pardiñez Jr.
- **Buhay Hayaan Yumabong (Buhay)**
  - First list:
    1. Christian Señeres (incumbent)
    2. Hermenegildo Dumlao
    3. Antonio Bautista
    4. Victor Pablo Trinidad
    5. Eduardo Solangon Jr.
  - Second list:
    1. **Rene Velarde** (incumbent)
    2. **Ma. Carissa Coscolluela**
    3. **Irwin Tieng**
    4. Melchor Monsod
    5. Teresita Villarama
- **Citizens' Battle Against Corruption (CIBAC)**
  1. **Joel Villanueva** (incumbent)
  2. Luis Lokin Jr.
  3. **Cinchona Gonzales**
  4. Sherwin Tugna
  5. Emil Galang
- **Coalition of Associations of Senior Citizens in the Philippines (Senior Citizens)**
  1. **Godofredo Arquiza**
  2. Jose Pamplona Sr.
  3. Bienvenido Lim Rañola
  4. Marcelino dela Cruz
  5. Luciano Beltran
  6. Benjamin Tomimbang Sr.
- **Cocofed - Philippine Coconut Producers Federation (Cocofed)**
  1. **Domingo Espina**
  2. Efren Villaseñor
  3. Saida Wong
  4. Federico Mortola
  5. Oscar Pialago
- Confederation of Grains Retailers Association of the Philippines (Grecon)
  1. Pablo Gonzales Jr.
  2. Helen Osin
  3. Zenaida Lim
  4. Fortunato Miranda
  5. Celsa Bernales
- **Coop-NATCCO Network Party (Coop-NATCCO)**
  1. Guillermo Cua (incumbent)
  2. **Jose Ping-ay**
  3. **Cresente Paez**
  4. Luis Carrillo
  5. Romulo Caceres
  6. Emmanuel Solis Jr.
- Democratic Independent Workers Association (DIWA)
  1. Emmeline Aglipay
  2. Pepito Pico
  3. Jamairy Domado
  4. J. Roberto Abling
  5. Luisita Agbayani
- Filipinos for Peace, Justice and Progress Movement (FPJPM)
  1. Lorenzo Cadsawan
  2. Oscar Valera Jr.
  3. Roger Federezo
  4. Evangeline Reyes
  5. Amoran Mai Batara
- **Gabriela Women's Party (Gabriela)**
  1. **Liza Maza** (incumbent)
  2. **Luzviminda Ilagan**
  3. Flora Belinan
  4. Nenita Cherniguin
  5. Helen Asdolo
  6. Maria Lourdes Jarabe
  7. Nenita Tampico
  8. Lucia Francisco
  9. Elena Bianan
  10. Marites Pielago
- Hanay ng Aping Pinoy (HAPI)
  1. Jamie Zarraga
  2. Tranquilino Picson
  3. Nino Zarraga
  4. Ricardo Pajarillaga
  5. Edgardo Roxas
- **Kabataan Party-list (Kabataan)**
  1. **Raymond Palatino**
  2. Enrico Almonguerra
  3. Mary Francis Veloso
  4. Mark Lovis Galanga
  5. Ma. Clarizza Singson
  6. Angela Colmenares-Sabino
- Kabukluran ng mga Kababaihan Filipina sa Timog Katagalugan (Buklod Filipina)
  1. Zenaida Tobias
  2. Cynthia Lising
  3. Virginia Teodosio
  4. Cristina Pacheco
  5. Josefina Fuentes
- Kalahi - Advocates for Overseas Filipino (Kalahi)
  1. Apostol Poe Gratela
  2. Karlo Nograles
  3. Luisito Clavano
  4. Sunday Olis
  5. Russel Contemplacion-Almarez
- **Kapatiran ng mga Nakulong na Walang Sala (Kakusa)**
  1. **Ranulfo Canonigo**
  2. Omar Rivera
  3. Ma. Jesusa Sespene
  4. Josie Manalo
  5. Ophelia Javier
- **Kasangga sa Kaunlaran (Ang Kasangga)** (Note: Maria Lourdes Arroyo held the seat won by Ang Kasangga.)
  1. Gaspar Gamban
  2. Alvin Cabatit
  3. Felicitas Lomotan
  4. Rosalito Trinidad
  5. Albert Suarez
- Koalisyon ng Katutubong Samahan ng Pilipinas (Kasapi)
- **Butil Farmers Party (Butil)**
  1. **Leonila Chavez** (incumbent)
  2. Agapito Guanlao
  3. Herminio Ocampo
  4. Reynaldo Capalad
  5. Rufino Hernandez
- Novelty Entrepreneurship and Livelihood for Food (NEELFFI)
  1. Hussein Pangandaman
  2. Perla Baldemor
  3. Rogelio Valle
  4. Mohammad Isa Perfecto Vergel de Dios Jr.
  5. Alfredo Nengasca
  6. Reuben Valle
- Parents Enabling Parents (PEP)
  1. Philip Piccio
  2. Vicente Ortuoste
  3. Victoria Jacinto
  4. Cornelio Zafra
  5. Jocelyn Upano
- Partido ng Manggagawa (PM)
  1. Gerardo Rivera
  2. Judy Ann Miranda
  3. Ma. Luisa Parroco
  4. Eliseo Alim
- People's Movement Against Poverty (PMAP)
  1. Ronaldo Lumbao
  2. Benita Tanyag
  3. Cynthia Villarin
  4. Jervina Maglunob
  5. Amado Masulit
- Pwersa ng Bayaning Atleta (PBA)
  1. Davey Christian Chua
  2. Enrico Pineda
  3. Jerry Herman Cordiñera
  4. Orlando Castelo
  5. Steven Anthony Relova
- Sandigang Maralita (SM)
  1. Abdulkhayer Sambitory
  2. Datu Alioden Noor Jr.
  3. Salem Batua-an
  4. Bai Johaimah Sacar
  5. Erwin Culanag
- Sanlakas
  1. Jose Virgilio Bautista
  2. Nilda Lagman-Sevilla
  3. Wilson Fortaleza
  4. Flora Santos
  5. Bibiano Rivera
- Seaman's Party (SPI)
  1. Nestor Vargas
  2. Danila Mauro
  3. Marcelino Villanueva
  4. Rodrigo de Villa
  5. Ulyses Sapalo
- Suara Bangsamoro Party-list (SUARA)
  1. Zaynab Ampatuan
  2. Amirah Ali Lidasan
  3. Samaon Buat
  4. Macasalong Sarip
  5. Fridah Olama
- Sulong Barangay Movement (SB)
  1. Efren Docena
  2. Roberto Brillante
  3. Jorge Mariano
  4. Faustino Tugade Jr.
  5. Romeo Valorozo
- The True Marcos Loyalist Association (Bantay)
  1. Jovito Palparan
  2. Ramon Garcia
  3. Benjamin Angeles
  4. Alan Guevara
  5. Agnes Reaño
- **Trade Union Congress Party (TUCP)**
  1. **Raymond Mendoza**
  2. Arnel Dolendo
  3. Alexander Aguilar
  4. Temistocles Dejon Jr.
  5. Michael Mendoza
- Union of the Masses for Democracy and Justice (UMDJ)
  1. Virgilio Eustaquio
  2. Salvador Panelo
  3. Ruben Dionisio
  4. Denis Ibona
- **United Movement Against Drugs Foundation (Uni Mad)**
  1. **Teodoro Lim**
  2. Alphonsus Crucero
  3. Enrique Galang Jr.
  4. Antonio Rom III
  5. Manuel Mendoza
- **Veterans Freedom Party (VFP)**
  - First list:
    1. **Estrella Santos** (incumbent)
    2. Ma. Esperanza de Ocampo
    3. Rey Gavina
    4. Peregrino Andres
    5. Manuel Pamaran
  - Second list:
    1. Rodrigo Gutang
    2. Francisco Tolin
    3. Juanito Aquias
    4. Jaime Echeverria
    5. Nestor Castillo
- **You Against Corruption and Poverty (YACAP)**
  1. **Carol Jane Lopez**
  2. **Haron Omar**
  3. Ernesto Moya
  4. Arnel Zapatos
  5. Alexis Wayne Valdivia
- Youth League for Peace Advancement (LYPAD)
