= List of members of the House of Representatives of the Philippines (G) =

This is a complete list of past and present members of the House of Representatives of the Philippines whose last names begin with the letter G.

This list also includes members of the Philippine Assembly (1907–1916), the Commonwealth National Assembly (1935–1941), the Second Republic National Assembly (1943–1944) and the Batasang Pambansa (1978–1986).

== Ga ==
- Isauro Gabaldón, member for Nueva Ecija (1907–1912), and Nueva Ecija's 2nd district (1934–1935)
- Ricardo Gacula, member for Ilocos Sur's 2nd district (1949–1957)
- Juan Gaerlan, member for Mountain Province (1931–1934)
- Ferdinand Gaite, member for Bayan Muna party-list (2019–2022)
- Ruperto Gaite, member for Makati (1984–1986)
- Emiliano Gala, member for Tayabas's 2nd district (1907–1909)
- Teodoro Galagar, member for Bohol's 3rd district (1965–1972)
- Gerald Galang, member of Valenzuela's 2nd district (2025–present)
- Edsel Galeos, member for Cebu's 2nd district (2022–present)
- Modesto Galias, member for Sorsogon's 1st district (1949–1953)
- Troadio Galicano, member for Cebu's 5th district (1907–1912)
- Celestino Gallares, member for Bohol's 1st district (1916–1922)
- Manuel Gallego, member for Nueva Ecija's 1st district (1931–1934, 1945–1946)
- Wilson Gamboa, member for Negros Oriental (1984–1986)
- Nemesio Ganan Jr., member for Region IV-A (1978–1984)
- Rodolfo Ganzon, member for Iloilo's 2nd district (1953–1957, 1961–1963)
- Florencio Garay, member for Surigao del Sur's 2nd district (2007–2016)
- Alfredo Garbin, member for Ako Bicol party-list (2010–2013, 2016–2022, 2025–present)
- Ulyses Garces, member for ABS party-list (2018–2019)
- Mylene Garcia-Albano, member for Davao City's 2nd district (2010–2019)
- Albert Garcia, member for Bataan's 2nd district (2004–2013, 2022–present)
- Alfonso Garcia, member for Region VI (1978–1984)
- Carlos P. Garcia, member for Bohol's 3rd district (1925–1931)
- Cosme Garcia, member for Bohol's 3rd district (1946–1949)
- Dante Garcia, member for La Union's 2nd district (2022–present)
- Gwendolyn Garcia, member for Cebu's 3rd district (2013–2019)
- Joet Garcia, member for Bataan's 2nd congressional district (2016–2022)
- Jose Arturo Garcia Jr., member for Rizal's 3rd district (2022–present)
- Manuel Garcia, member for Region XI (1978–1984), Davao City (1984–1986), and Davao City's 2nd district (1992–2001)
- Maria Angela Garcia, member for Bataan's 3rd district (2022–present)
- Mario Garcia, member for Nueva Ecija (1984–1986)
- Maximino Garcia, member for Bohol's 3rd district (1957–1965)
- Pablo P. Garcia, member for Cebu's 3rd district (1987–1995), and Cebu's 2nd district (2007–2013)
- Pablo John Garcia, member for Cebu's 3rd district (2007–2013, 2019–2025)
- Rogelio Garcia, member for South Cotabato (1984–1986)
- Simeon Garcia Jr., member for Nueva Ecija's 2nd district (1987–1992, 1998–2001)
- Tet Garcia, member for Bataan's 2nd district (1987–1992, 1995–2004, 2013–2016)
- Vincent Garcia, member for Davao City's 2nd district (2001–2010, 2019–2025)
- Rufino Garde, member for Capiz's 3rd district (1931–1934)
- Feliciano Gardiner, member for Tarlac's 2nd district (1934–1935)
- Edwin Gardiola, member for CWS party-list (2022–present)
- Venancio Garduce, member for Samar's 2nd district (1987–1992)
- Agapito Garduque, member for Abra (1935–1938)
- Felipe Garduque, member for Cagayan's 1st district (1953–1961)
- Janette Garin, member for Iloilo's 1st district (2004–2013, 2019–present)
- Ninfa Garin, member for Iloilo's 1st district (1998–2001)
- Oscar Garin Sr., member for Iloilo's 1st district (1987–1998, 2001–2004)
- Richard Garin, member for Iloilo's 1st district (2013–2019)
- Sharon Garin, member for AAMBIS-Owa party-list (2010–2022)
- Greg Gasataya, member for Bacolod (2016–present)
- Chito Gascon, sectoral member (1987–1992)
- Segundo Gaston, member for Misamis (1925–1928), and Misamis Oriental (1934–1935)
- Kenneth Gatchalian, member for Valenzuela's 1st district (2025–present)
- Rex Gatchalian, member for Valenzuela's 1st district (2007–2013, 2022–2023)
- Wes Gatchalian, member for Alay Buhay party-list (2012–2016), and Valenzuela's 1st district (2016–2022)
- Win Gatchalian, member for Valenzuela's 1st district (2001–2004, 2013–2016)
- Angelito Gatlabayan, member for Antipolo's 2nd district (2007–2010)
- Clemente Gatmaitan, member from the Cabinet (1978–1984)
- Jun Gato, member for Batanes (2019–2026)
- Simon Gato, member for Region II (1978–1984)
- Augustin Gatuslao, member for Negros Occidental's 3rd district (1953–1965, 1969–1972)
- Antonio Gatuslao, member for Negros Occidental (1984–1986)
- Roberto Gatuslao, member for Region VI (1978–1984), and Negros Occidental (1984–1986)
- Manuel Gavieres, member for Surigao (1909–1910)

== Ge ==
- Jose Generoso, member for Manila's 2nd district (1916–1922)
- Rico Geron, member for AGAP party-list (2013–2019)
- Adolfo Gerona, member for Sorsogon's 1st district (1931–1935)
- Adolfo Geronimo, sectoral member (1995–1998)
- Roman Gesmundo, member for Laguna's 1st district (1928–1931)

== Gi ==
- Ernesto Gidaya, member for VFP party-list (2004–2007)
- Pedro Gil, member for Manila's 2nd district (1928–1931, 1935–1941)
- Bonifacio Gillego, member for Sorsogon's 2nd district (2010–2019)

== Gl ==
- Maria Kristina Jihan Glepa, member for One Coop party-list (2025–present)

== Go ==
- Ana Cristina Go, member for Isabela's 2nd district (2010–2019)
- Arnulfo Go, member for Sultan Kudarat's 2nd district (2007–2016)
- Ed Christopher Go, member for Isabela's 2nd district (2019–present)
- Maria Catalina Go, member for Leyte's 5th district (1998–2001)
- Mark Go, member for Baguio (2016–2025)
- Anthony Golez, member for Bacolod (2010–2013), and Malasakit@Bayanihan party-list (2022–2025)
- Jaime Golez, member for Negros Occidental (1984–1986)
- Roilo Golez, member for Parañaque (1992–2001), and Parañaque's 2nd district (2004–2013)
- Dominador Gómez, member for Manila's 1st district (1907–1908, 1911–1912)
- Feliciano Gomez, member for Laguna's 1st district (1916–1919, 1931–1934)
- Richard Gomez, member for Leyte's 4th district (2022–present)
- Teodoro Gomez, member for Pangasinan's 4th district (1916–1919)
- Tomas Gomez, member for Samar's 1st district (1912–1916)
- Aguedo Gonzaga, member for Negros Occidental's 2nd district (1945–1946)
- Ruwel Peter Gonzaga, member for Davao de Oro's 2nd district (2016–2025)
- Vicente Gonzaga, member for Surigao (1931–1934)
- Alexandria Gonzales, member for Mandaluyong (2016–2019, 2025–present)
- Aurelio Gonzales Jr., member for Pampanga's 3rd district (2007–2013, 2016–2025)
- Fausto Gonzales, member for Pampanga's 2nd district (1938–1941)
- Fernando Gonzales, member for Albay's 3rd district (2010–2019)
- Isidoro Gonzales, member for Nueva Ecija (1916–1919)
- Jacobo Gonzales, member for Laguna's 1st district (1953–1961)
- Jose Mari Gonzales, member for San Juan (1998–2001)
- Lucio Gonzales, member for Nueva Ecija (1912–1916)
- Matias Gonzales, member for Pangasinan's 5th district (1907–1909)
- Mica Gonzales, member for Pampanga's 3rd district (2025–present)
- Neptali Gonzales, member for Rizal's 1st district (1969–1972), and San Juan–Mandaluyong (1984–1986)
- Neptali Gonzales II, member for Mandaluyong (1995–2004, 2007–2016, 2019–2025)
- Pacita Gonzales, member for Zambales's 2nd district (1987–1992)
- Rodolfo Gonzales, member for Sorsogon's 2nd district (1998–2001)
- Roy Gonzales, member for Santa Rosa (2025–present)
- Sheen Gonzales, member for Eastern Samar (2025–present)
- Carlo Lizandro Gonzalez, member for Marino party-list (2019–2025)
- Raul M. Gonzalez, member for Iloilo City (1995–2004)
- Raul Gonzalez Jr., member for Iloilo City (2004–2010)
- Ricardo Gonzalez, member for Pangasinan's 5th district (1919–1925)
- Amelia Gordon, member for Olongapo (1984–1986)
- Katherine Gordon, member for Zambales's 1st district (1987–1995)
- James Gordon Jr., member for Zambales's 1st district (1995–2004)
- Arcadio Gorriceta, member for Iloilo's 2nd district (2013–2019)
- Kathryn Joyce Gorriceta, member for Iloilo's 2nd district (2025–present)
- Michael Gorriceta, member for Iloilo's 2nd district (2019–2025)
- Oscar Gozos, member for Batangas's 4th district (2001–2007)

== Gr ==
- Leoncio Grajo, member for Sorsogon's 1st district (1909–1916, 1919–1922)
- Estanislao Granados, member for Leyte's 1st district (1909–1916)
- Nicanor Gregorius, member for Iloilo's 3rd district (1916–1919)

== Gu ==
- Espiridion Guanco, member for Iloilo's 4th district (1909–1912)
- Agapito Guanlao, member for Butil party-list (2009–2016)
- Roberto Guanzon, member for Caloocan's 1st district (1995–1998)
- Romeo Guanzon, member for Bacolod (1987–1998)
- Mario Guariña, member for Sorsogon's 2nd district (1925–1928)
- Fernando María Guerrero, member for Manila's 2nd district (1907–1909)
- Leon Maria Guerrero, member for Bulacan's 2nd district (1907–1909)
- Leonardo Guerrero, member for Cavite's 1st district (1987–1992)
- Pedro Guevara, member for Laguna's 2nd district (1909–1916)
- Yeng Guiao, member for Pampanga's 1st district (2013–2016)
- Ramon Guico Jr., member for Pangasinan's 5th district (2022–present)
- Ramon Guico III, member for Pangasinan's 5th district (2019–2022)
- Teofisto Guingona Sr., member for Negros Oriental's 2nd district (1909–1914)
- TG Guingona, member for Bukidnon's 2nd district (2004–2010)
- León Guinto, member for Tayabas's 2nd district (1925–1931), and Manila (1943–1944)
- Leon Guinto Jr., member for Quezon's 2nd district (1953–1961)
- Ivan Howard Guintu, member for Pinuno party-list (2022–2025), and Capiz's 1st district (2025–present)
- Eduardo Gullas, member for Cebu's 3rd district (1969–1972), and Cebu's 1st district (1992–2001, 2004–2013, 2019–2022)
- Jose Gullas, member for Cebu's 1st district (2001–2004)
- Paulino Gullas, member for Cebu's 2nd district (1925–1928), and Cebu (1943–1944)
- Rhea Mae Gullas, member for Cebu's 1st district (2022–present)
- Samsam Gullas, member for Cebu's 1st district (2013–2019)
- Miguel Gumangan, member for Mountain Province's 3rd district (1938–1941)
- Silvino Gumpal, member for Isabela (1934–1935)
- Datu Ibra Gundarangin, member for Mindanao and Sulu (1931–1934)
- Magi Gunigundo, member for Valenzuela (1998–2001), and Valenzuela's 2nd district (2001–2004, 2007–2016)
- Armando Gustilo, member for Negros Occidental's 1st district (1963–1972)
- Ernesto Gustilo, member for Iloilo's 3rd district (1912–1916)
- Vicente Gustilo, member for Negros Occidental's 1st district (1946–1949, 1957–1962)
- Rodrigo Gutang, member for Cotabato's 1st district (1987–1992)
- Barry Gutierrez, member for Akbayan party-list (2013–2016)
- Eduardo Gutierrez David, member for Pampanga's 1st district (1912–1919)
- Rodge Gutierrez, member for 1-Rider party-list (2022–present)
- Godofredo Guya, member for Recoboda party-list (2019–2022)
- Crisanto Guysayko, member for Laguna's 2nd district (1916–1919, 1938–1941)
- Antonio Guzman, member for Cagayan's 2nd district (1925–1928)
- Dimas Guzman, member for Isabela (1907–1909)
- Pablo Guzman, member for Cagayan's 1st district (1907–1909)
