= Ulisse (given name) =

- Gender: male
- Language: Italian

Origin
- Language: Latin < Greek
- Origin: Ulixes (Latin) < Odysseus (Greek)
- Meaning: wrathful (Greek)

Other names
- Related names: Ulysses (English), Ulixes (Latin), Ulysse (French), Ulisses (Portuguese), Ulises (Spanish), Odysseus (Ancient Greek), Ulise (Romanian), Uliss/Улисс (Russian), Ulis/Ուլիս (Armenian)

Ulisse is an Italian male given name, the Italian version of the English name "Ulysses", originating from the Greek name "Odysseus", as in the mythological Odysseus from the Trojan War poems by Homer the Iliad and the Odyssey.

== List ==
People with this name include:

- Ulisse Aldrovandi (1522–1605), Italian naturalist
- Ulisse Carlo Bascherini (1844–1933), Roman Catholic prelate who served as Bishop of Grosseto
- Ulisse Cambi (1807–1895), Italian sculptor
- Ulisse Cantagalli (1839–1901), Italian pottery producer
- Ulisse Caputo (1872–1948), Italian painter
- Ulisse Ciocchi (1570–1631), Italian painter
- Ulisse Dini (1845–1918), Italian mathematician and politician
- Ulisse Giuseppe Gozzadini (1650–1728), Italian Cardinal who served as bishop of Imola
- Ulisse Gualtieri (born 1941), Italian soccer player
- Ulisse Munari (born 1960), Italian astronomer
- Ulisse Pichi (1867–1925), Italian painter
- Ulisse Quadri (born 1953), Italian astronomer
- Ulisse Ribustini (1852–1944), Italian painter
- Ulisse Stacchini (1871–1947), Italian architect
- Ulisse Stefanelli (fl. early 21st century), Italian mathematician
- Giulio Ulisse Arata (1881–1962), Italian architect
- Count Raffaele Ulisse Barbolani (1818–1900), Italian diplomat and journalist
- Giovanni Ulisse Lucci (18th century), Italian painter

== See also ==
- Ulisses, the Portuguese version of this name
- Ulises, the Spanish version of this name
- Ulysse, the French version of this name
- Ulysses (given name), the English version of this name
