= ULE =

ULE may refer to:

- DECT Ultra Low Energy, a wireless communication standard, which is used to create wireless sensor and actuator networks
- Unidirectional Lightweight Encapsulation, a protocol for network layer packets over MPEG transport streams
- ULE scheduler, a computer operating system scheduler
- Ultra low expansion glass, made by Corning Incorporated
- Ule (company), a Chinese e-commerce platform
- Ule (surname), people surnamed Ule
