= Ulysses Grant Bourne =

American physician (1873–1956)

- Born: March 17, 1873; Island Creek, Calvert County, Maryland
- Died: 1956 (aged 82–83)
- Education: Leonard Medical College (now Shaw University)
- Occupations: Physician and civic leader

Ulysses Grant Bourne (1873–1956) was an American physician and civic leader in Frederick, Maryland.

== Background ==
Bourne was born in Island Creek, Calvert County, Maryland, on March 17, 1873, the ninth of ten children. His parents were Lewis and Emily Bourne. In 1902, he graduated from Leonard Medical College (now Shaw University) in Raleigh, North Carolina. In 1903, he opened his medical practice in Frederick.

== Career ==
Because he was African American, Bourne was not allowed to practice at Frederick City Hospital (now Frederick Memorial Hospital). So he set up his practice at 30 West All Saints Street in downtown Frederick. He accepted both African American and white patients.

Bourne attended to most of his patients at his office, but he also used a horse and buggy to make house calls. If his patients could not afford to pay, he accepted meat and produce as payment. He delivered 2,600 babies over the course of his 50-year career.

In 1919, he and Charles Brooks founded the 15-bed Hospital for Blacks at 173 West All Saints Street, which was the only hospital in Frederick to accept African American patients. It operated until 1928, when the Frederick City Hospital opened a new wing for African American patients. Dr. Bourne became the first African American doctor permitted to practice there.

== Civic Activities ==
Bourne was very active in civic affairs. In 1931, he founded the Maryland Negro Medical Society, and in 1934 he co-founded the Frederick County Branch of the NAACP and served as its president for 20 years. Bourne became the first African American man from western Maryland to run for a seat in the Maryland House of Delegates. He also served as the regional vice president of the sixth Republican district. When he and his friends were not allowed to enter the front door of the only opera house in Frederick, they opened their own opera house, which later became known as Pythian Castle.

== Personal life ==
Bourne was married three times. He and his first wife Grace had two children: Ulysses Grant Bourne Jr. and Gladys. Grace died in 1914. Bourne and his second wife Mary Frances Beane Bourne had one daughter, Isabella Blanche. Mary Frances died in 1950. Dr. Bourne married his third wife in 1953.

Bourne was a trustee of Asbury Methodist Church in Frederick for 50 years. He was also an active member of the Masonic Lodge. Bourne retired in 1953, and he died three years later.

== Legacy ==
All three of Bourne's children became involved in medicine. In 1961, his son Ulysses Grant Bourne Jr. became the first African American doctor to have privileges at Frederick Memorial Hospital, while his daughter Gladys (Thornton) became a nurse. Blanche Bourne-Tyree became the first woman from Frederick County to obtain a medical degree. She was a pediatrician and public health administrator in Washington, D.C., for 40 years.

Blanche Bourne-Tyree said of her father, “My dad was a very positive person ... he gave us the legacy of service to others.” Esther Jewell, who worked as a nurse with both Dr. Bourne and his son, said of Dr. Bourne, “He was a very good influence. He was a good leader and he knew how to treat his patients with respect. You weren't just a number, you were respected as a human being.” In his eulogy for Bourne, Cecil B. LaGrange of Asbury Methodist Church said, "He was a quiet, unassuming man, doing only those things which he felt were for the good of his people and the community in which he lived."

In 2007, a permanent memorial to Bourne, with a bronze bust, was installed at Frederick Memorial Hospital. Blanche Bourne-Tyree established a scholarship in her father’s name, the Dr. Ulysses Grant Bourne Memorial Scholarship Fund, which is administered by the Community Foundation of Frederick County. In 2014, Frederick County renamed a public building (located at 355 Montevue Lane) after Bourne. The building houses the Division of Public Works and the Parks and Recreation Department.
