= Ulisses (footballer, born 1986) =

Brazilian footballer (1986–2025)

Personal information
- Full name: Ulisses Alves da Silveira
- Date of birth: 15 April 1986
- Place of birth: São Gonçalo, Brazil
- Date of death: 24 June 2025 (aged 39)
- Place of death: Rio de Janeiro, Brazil
- Height: 1.70 m (5 ft 7 in)
- Position: Left-back

Youth career
- 2002–2004: Fluminense

Senior career*
Years	Team	Apps	(Gls)
2004–2008	Fluminense	6	(0)
2007	→ Juventude (loan)		
2009	Vasco da Gama		
- * Club domestic league appearances and goals

Ulisses Alves da Silveira (15 April 1986 – 24 June 2025), or simply Ulisses, was a Brazilian professional footballer who played as a left-back.

== Career ==
Ulisses competed with Marcelo at left-back position in Fluminense's youth teams. He played for Juventude on loan from Fluminense and had a short spell at Vasco da Gama.

== Death ==
He was found dead in Rio de Janeiro on 24 June 2025, at the age of 39.
