= Ulysse (disambiguation) =

Ulysse is a French masculine given name.

Ulysse may also refer to:

== People ==
- Ulysse (surname)

== Arts, entertainment and media ==
- Ulysse FM, Tunisian radio station
- Ulysse (Rebel), an opera by Jean-Féry Rebel
- Ulysse (ballet), a French contemporary dance work by Jean-Claude Gallota

== Other uses ==
- Fiat Ulysse, a European car, a multi-purpose-vehicle (MPV) minvan
- Team Ulysse, La Plaine, Quebec, Canada, a junior ice hockey team

== See also ==
- Ulysses (disambiguation)
- Odysseus (disambiguation), the Greek form of the name
- Ulisses, the Portuguese version of the given name
- Ulises, the Spanish version of the given name
