= Uli =

Uli or ULI, may refer to:

== Places ==
- Uli, Anambra, Nigeria; a town
- Uli, Iran; a village

== People ==
- Uli I of Mali (Yérélinkon; 13th century), emperor of Mali

=== Germanic name ===
Uli is a name, short for Ulrich or Ulrike and common in Germany.

- Uli Beckerhoff (born 1947), Jazz composer
- Uli Borowka (born 1962), German football player
- Uli der Fehlerteufel, a character in German schoolbooks
- Uli Derickson (1944–2005), flight attendant during the 1985 hijacking of TWA Flight 847
- Uli Edel (born 1947), German film director
- Uli Herzner (born 1971), German American fashion designer
- Uli Hiemer (born 1962), German professional ice hockey player
- Uli Hoeneß (born 1952), German football (soccer) player
- Uli Jon Roth (born 1954), German neoclassical metal guitarist
- Uli Kusch (born 1967), heavy metal drummer
- Uli Schmidt (born 1961), South African rugby union footballer
- Uli Sigg (born 1946), Swiss businessman, diplomat, art collector
- Uli Stein (born 1954), German football player
- Uli Stielike (born 1954), German football player
- Uli Trepte (1941–2009), German musician
- Uli Vos (born 1946), field hockey player from Germany

== Groups, organization ==
- Uniono por la Linguo Internaciona Ido (Union for the International Language Ido)
- Urban Land Institute

== Arts, entertainment, design, media ==
- Uli figure, from New Ireland, Papua New Guinea
- Uli (design), by the Igbo people of Nigeria

== Other uses ==
- Unified Lending Interface, an Indian lending interface
- Union List of Israel
- Ulithian language (ISO 639 code "uli")
- Uli (food), a rice-based food

== See also ==
- Ulia
- Ulies
- Ulises
- Ulis (disambiguation)
- ULY (disambiguation)
