= Ulisse Cantagalli =

Ulisse Cantagalli (1839-1901) was an Italian pottery producer in Florence, Grand Duchy of Tuscany. He was born into a family of Italian pottery makers, the Cantagalli name having been associated with ceramics since the 15th century. However, it's unclear whether they were makers or merchants. It's been established, though, that they were well known in Impruneta (a town south of Florence) as “furnacers”, land and property owners, and that the Cantagalli factory was producing ceramics in Florence by the beginning of the 18th century.

== Biography ==
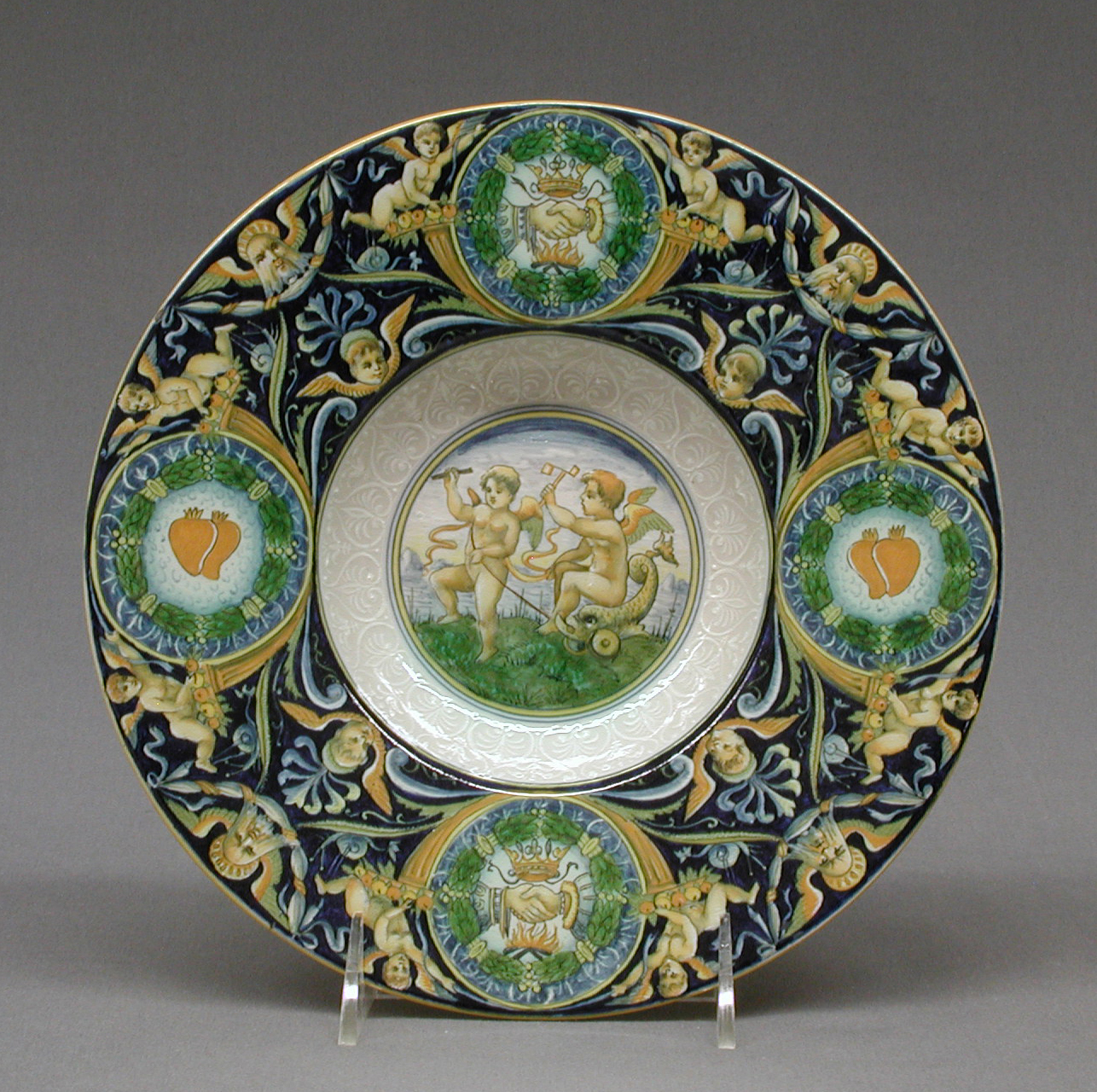
Ulisse Cantagalli Plate - Metropolitan Museum of Art, New York

Second of four siblings, Ulisse was born in 1839 and grew up enjoying a privileged lifestyle until 1848, when his father was declared bankrupt and, overwhelmed by the turn of fortune, committed suicide. His mother, Flavia Franceschi, continued to run the family business. She focused on the production of terracotta, occasionally making a few majolica pieces.

Ulisse entered the family business as a young man, determined to rebuild the family reputation. He proved to be an ambitious, talented man with a strong vision.

In 1878, Ulisse and Romeo took over the pottery factory in Florence and began to trade as Manifattura Figli di Giuseppe Cantagalli.

During the same year, Ulisse met Margaret Tod, a Scottish girl who called at his store in Florence. Margaret Tod and Ulisse Cantagalli were married in the Roman Catholic Cathedral of St. Mary’s in Edinburgh, on 31 August 1880, with Ulisse’s brother Romeo, and Margaret’s brother Robert, as witnesses. Their marriage established a permanent bond between the two cities of Edinburgh and Florence.

The success of his enterprise rested in the intuition that Italian ceramics had reached a peak of artistic quality during the Renaissance and the vast, artistically informed visitors attracted by Florence would be very interested in buying high-quality reproductions.

Being Florence an Italian cultural landmark and one of the cities of the Gran Tour, he was in the ideal place to fulfill his ambitions. His Italian ceramics became prized collectors' pieces, celebrated throughout Europe, especially in Great Britain.

He died in Egypt on 29th March 1901.

== Work ==
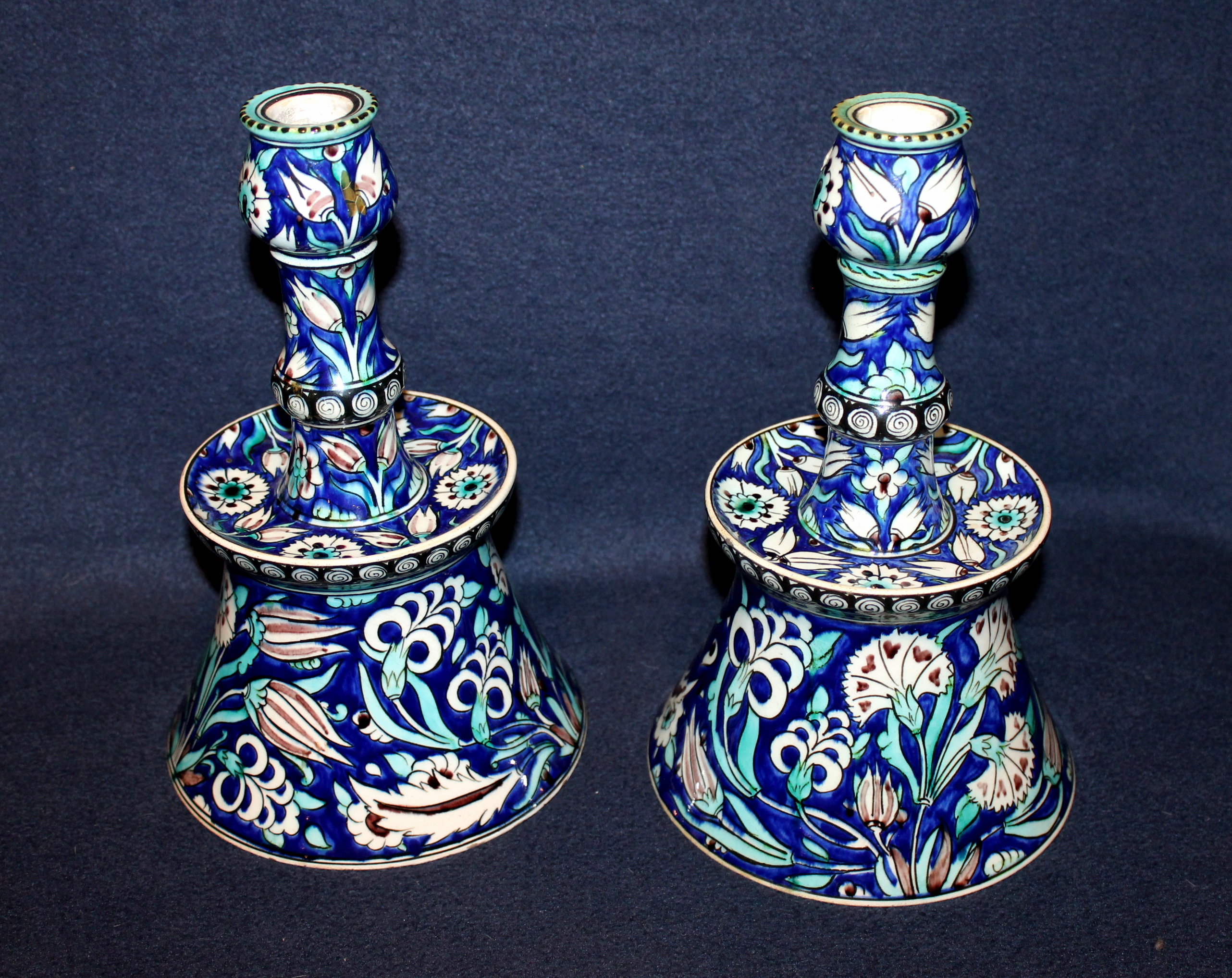
Ulisse Cantagalli - Candlesticks Iznik style

Ulisse Cantagalli understood that there was a vast opportunity for high-end Italian maiolica early in the 1870s. He set out to reorganize his business to emulate the early Renaissance pieces, not as fakes, but as reproductions. He equipped his factory to produce maiolica, the highest expression of Renaissance ceramic art and started training talented painters, founding a school of design aimed at teaching the art of majolica to his best workers.

His artisans thrived under Ulisse's guidance, nurturing his dream to establish a center of Decorative Arts to showcase Italian talents. At the same time, he scoured art galleries, museums and private collections in constant search of Renaissance majolicas to draw inspiration from. When he found a piece he liked, he sketched its design on a large acetate sheet, using pastel colors and tempera. His surviving sketchbook bears testimony to his draughtsmanship, great artistic ability, and eye for detail.

In the article on Cantagalli's life and work, Sheila Forbes explains how, in the 1870s, "the English influence was so compelling that Florence was styled ‘the Glorious English Florence’, a term supported by major discriminating collectors like Frederick Stibbert, and H.P. Horne, collector and art critic, who both lived in Florence, as well as other men of taste, for example, Lord Carmichael, a passionate collector of Cantagalli, John Ruskin, William Morris, and William De Morgan with whom Ulisse developed a special working relationship."

Ulisse Cantagalli relished the popularity of his work both with local collectors and foreigners on the Grand Tour, providing the discerning collectors with high-quality reproductions of Robbiane, Renaissance majolicas, lusterware and pieces in the Islamic and Moresque styles. He decorated the house of Stibbert in Florence, now a museum, made the Della Robbia style "tondi" (circular sculptures) for Palazzo Pitti. Margaret Cantagalli worked with her husband, cultivating and maintaining good relationships with British buyers.

By 1895 the Manifattura Cantagalli was famous throughout Europe, employed 121 workers and published a catalog featuring 1069 products.

Ulisse never stopped looking for new designs in Italy and abroad. In 1892 he visited the Azulejos factory in Seville, and traveled on from there to Tangier. In 1901 he went looking for inspiration in Egypt, where he was taken ill and eventually died.

The Manifattura Cantagalli continued to thrive under the guidance of Margaret Cantagalli, Ulisse's wife. After Margaret's death in 1930, her daughter Flavia took over. However, she was not successful in her attempt to break away from the company’s commitment to the traditional, and the factory was finally closed in the 1950s.

== Cantagalli Mark ==
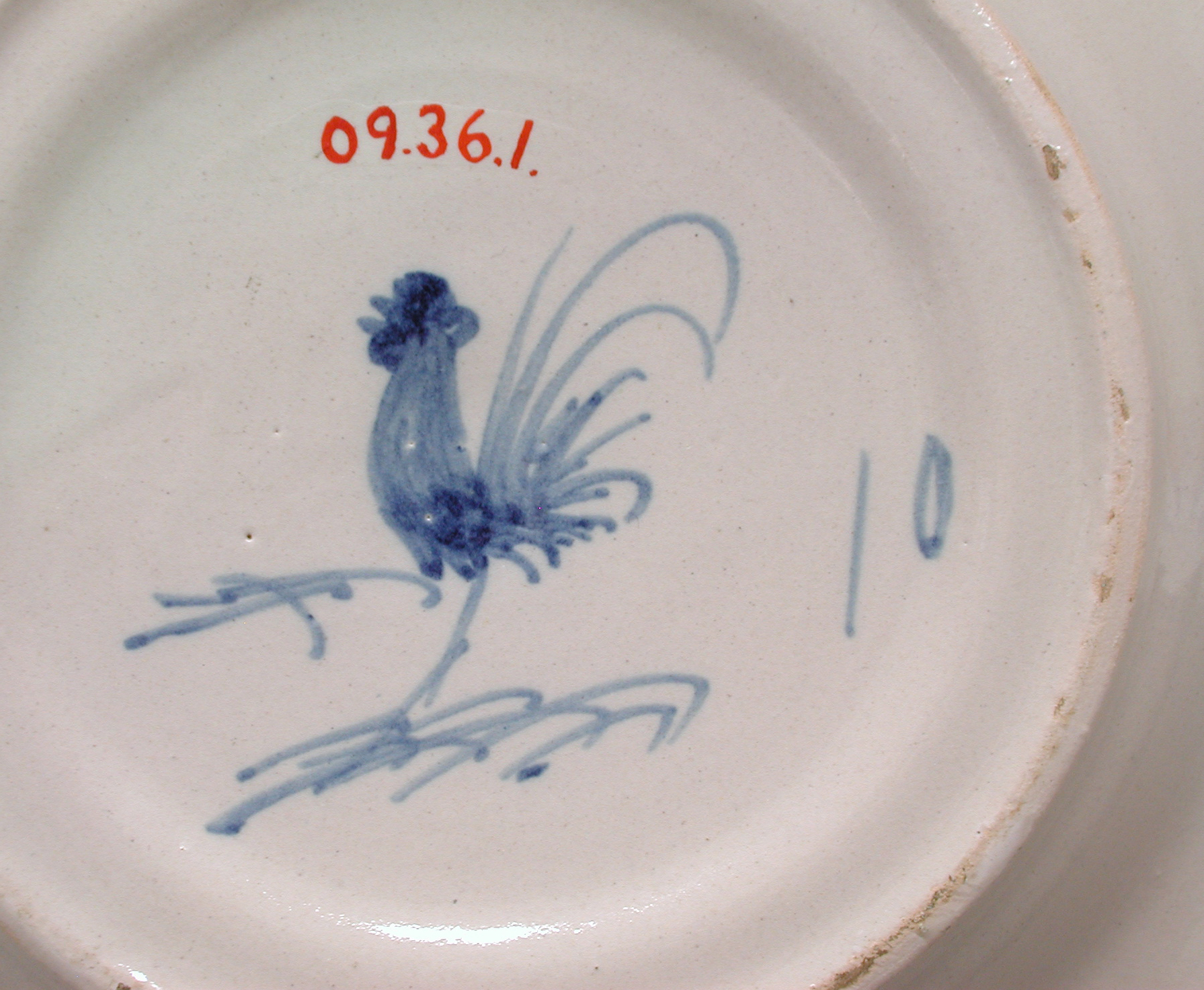
Cantagalli's Cockerel Mark - Metropolitan Museum of Art, New York

The Cantagalli mark was a “singing cockerel” - a visual translation of the family name. The sketchy cockerel has an open beak, extended neck; one of its claws is raised, while the other usually rests on a single line. Ulisse's early production was also identified by a shield and family crest, but from 1880 the cockerel has been on its own.

== Exhibitions ==
The Cantagalli company impressed critics and collectors by winning prizes in major exhibitions:

- 1881, Gold medal at the Great Industrial Exhibition in Milan

- 1884, Gold medal at the General Italian Exhibition in Turin

- 1885, Diploma with Honours at the Universal Exhibition in Antwerp

- 1889, Gold medal at the Exhibition of Artistic Industries at the Artistic Industrial Museum in Rome

- 1900, commendation of the British Museum at the Universal Exhibition in Paris
