= Ulise =

- Gender: male
- Language: Romanian, English, French, Spanish

Origin
- Language: Latin < Greek
- Origin: Ulixes (Latin) < Odysseus (Greek)

Other names
- Related names: Ulixes (Latin), Ulysses (English), Ulysse (French), Ulisses (Portuguese), Ulises (Spanish), Ulisse (Italian), Uliss/Улисс (Russian), Ulis/Ուլիս (Armenian)

Ulise is a male given name. Notable people with this name include:

- Ulise Joseph Desjardins (1907–1985), Canadian-born U.S. Olympic diver
- Ulise Petrescu (born 1902), Romanian Olympic bobsledder
- Dan Ulise Grigorescu (1917–1990), Romanian photographic artist, son of Romanian general Eremia Grigorescu
- George Ulise Negropontes (1871–1945), Romanian businessman and landowner, member of the Negroponte family of Greek nobles

== See also ==
- Ulises, Spanish version of the name
- Ulisses, Portuguese version of the name
- Ulisse (given name), Italian version of the name
- Ulysses (given name), English version of the name
- Ulysse, French version of the name
