= Ulisses (footballer, born 1989) =

Brazilian footballer

Personal information
- Full name: Ulisses Rocha de Oliveira
- Date of birth: 25 March 1989 (age 37)
- Place of birth: Belo Horizonte, Brazil
- Height: 1.85 m (6 ft 1 in)
- Position: Midfielder

Team information
- Current team: Anadia
- Number: 88

Youth career
- 2007–2009: América Mineiro

Senior career*
Years	Team	Apps	(Gls)
2010	América Mineiro	3	(0)
2011	Campinense		
2011–2012	América Mineiro	6	(0)
2012	→ Tupi (loan)	9	(0)
2012	→ Uberaba (loan)		
2013	Goiás	5	(0)
2014	Esportivo	5	(1)
2014	Anápolis	6	(1)
2014	Villa Nova	5	(2)
2015	Tupi	10	(0)
2015–2016	Louletano	30	(2)
2016–2017	Fátima	21	(3)
2017–2019	União de Leiria	64	(7)
2019–2020	Vilafranquense	19	(1)
2020–2021	El Ejido	3	(0)
2021–2022	Torreense	37	(1)
2022–2024	Differdange 03	42	(3)
2024–	Anadia	5	(0)
- * Club domestic league appearances and goals as of 25 June 2025

Ulisses Rocha de Oliveira (born 25 March 1989), known as Ulisses, is a Brazilian football player who plays for Portuguese club Anadia.

== Club career ==
He made his professional debut in the Campeonato Brasileiro Série B for América Mineiro on 29 May 2010 in a game against Ipatinga.
