= SS Ulysses (1914) =

History

United States
- Name: Ulysses
- Namesake: Ulysses of Homer's Odyssey
- Owner: Panama Canal Company
- Operator: Panama Canal Company
- Route: Hampton Roads–Cristóbal, Colón
- Builder: Maryland Steel Company, Sparrows Point
- Yard number: 144
- Laid down: 19 May 1914
- Launched: 12 December 1914
- Acquired: 17 April 1915
- Out of service: 1929
- Fate: Sold 1930

United States
- Owner: American Tankers Corp
- Acquired: 1930
- Fate: Sold 1937
- Notes: Converted to tanker

United States
- Owner: Western Operating Corp
- Acquired: 1937
- Fate: Sold 1942
- Notes: Converted to Whale oil factory ship

Argentina
- Name: San Blas
- Owner: Yacimientos Petroliferos Fiscales
- Acquired: 1942
- Fate: Explosion & fire La Plata 27 April 1944
- Notes: Converted to tanker

General characteristics
- Type: Collier
- Tonnage: 11,081 GRT 1916; 10,804 GRT 1930 as tanker; 12,056 GRT 1937 as Whale oil factory ship; 13,563 DWT
- Displacement: 19,585 long tons (19,899 t) full load
- Length: 536 ft (163 m)
- Beam: 65 ft (20 m)
- Draft: 28 ft 1 in (8.56 m)
- Installed power: 3 x double ended Scotch boilers
- Propulsion: 2 x triple expansion steam engines, 2 x screws, combined 7,200 indicated hp
- Speed: 14 kn (16 mph; 26 km/h)
- Complement: 32 officers, 146 men (design accommodation)
- Armament: during World War I; 1 × 5 in (130 mm) gun; 1 × 3 in (76 mm) gun

The SS Ulysses (Panama Collier No. 1) was the first of two steel-hulled, twin screw colliers constructed at Sparrows Point, Maryland by the Maryland Steel Company for the Panama Canal Company. (Note: The second was Achilles laid down 21 May 1914, launched 6 February 1915 with trials 8–9 June and delivery 10 June 1915. Both deliveries were well in advance of the contract delivery date of 9 August 1915.) The ships were to a Navy design and built under naval supervision but with major differences from the two previously constructed Navy colliers, Jason and Orion. Unlike the Navy ships and many colliers the ships had ten cargo handling king posts rather than the tall, specialized coaling booms as the ships were designed to transport coal to the Panama Canal and be unloaded by equipment there.

== Construction ==
The keel was laid 19 May 1914 as hull number 144 with launch on 12 December 1914 and trials 14–15 April 1915. On 17 April 1915 was delivered at the Norfolk Navy Yard to the Panama Canal Company.

Ulysses (and Achilles) were registered at 11,081 GRT, 13,563 DWT, 536 ft (163.4 m) length overall, 514 ft (156.7 m) length between perpendiculars, 65 ft (19.8 m) beam, 39 ft 6 in (12.0 m) molded depth with a loaded draft of 28 ft 1 in (8.6 m).

Steam power was by means of three double ended 16 ft (4.9 m) diameter Scotch marine boilers that were 22 ft 1 in (6.7 m) long operating under forced draft. Main propulsion was by two triple expansion steam engines with combined indicated 7,200 horsepower driving two 17 ft (5.2 m) screws with pitch adjustment from 16 ft (4.9 m) to 18 ft (5.5 m) for a design speed of 14 kn (16 mph; 26 km/h). On trials Ulysses averaged 14.99 kn (17.25 mph; 27.76 km/h) on the standardization course. Two 25 kilowatt generators provided electrical power and a two-ton refrigeration unit was installed for ship's stores. Accommodation was designed for 32 officers and 146 men.

The ship was designed to transport coal to the Panama Canal and then be unloaded by equipment there and thus did not have the coaling booms so characteristic of colliers designed for direct ship to ship coaling operations. Acceptance test for the unloader towers in Panama took place on 28 February 1916 first using Ulysses and then Achilles. Problems with the unloading towers were revealed during that test that delayed acceptance. Four cargo holds for coal and two oil holds forward were covered by hatches designed to hinge upward and served by ten king posts for raising and lowering the covers.

== Operation ==
Ulysses shuttled between Hampton Roads and the Panama Canal Zone, carrying coal to Cristobal, into 1917. During World War I the ship received a main battery of one 5-inch gun and a 3-inch gun and a Navy armed guard crew to man them while the ship continued to discharge her longstanding duties. The guns were apparently removed shortly after the Armistice ended hostilities. Throughout the War, Ulysses belonged to the Panama Canal Company and operated under the control of the Panama Railroad. She continued in this status after peace returned until 1929. In 1929 she was sold and converted to a tanker for American Tankers Corp, her Gross register tonnage decreased to 10,804. In 1937 she was converted to a Whale oil factory ship for the Western Operating Corp and her gross register tonnage was assessed at 12,056. Finally in 1942 she was sold to the Argentinian company Yacimientos Petroliferos Fiscales and renamed San Blas being converted back to a tanker. On 27 April 1944 she suffered an explosion and fire at Central Dock, La Plata.

== See also ==
- USS Ulysses (ARB-9)
