= Ulysse =

- Gender: male
- Language: French

Origin
- Language: Latin < Greek
- Origin: Ulysses (Latin) < Odysseus (Greek)

Other names
- Anglicisation: Ulysses
- Related names: Ulysses (English), Ulysses (Latin), Ulisses (Portuguese), Ulises (Spanish), Ulisse (Italian), Ulise (Romanian), Odysseus (Ancient Greek)

Ulysse, the French spelling of Ulysses, is a masculine French given name.

Notable people with the name include:

- Ulysse Adjagba (born 1993), French basketball player
- Ulysse Bozonnet (1922–2014), French ski mountaineer
- Ulysse Chevalier (1841–1923), French bibliographer and historian
- Ulysse Delécluse (1907–1995), French clarinetist
- Ulysse Gémignani (1906–1973), French sculptor
- Ulysse Trélat (politician) (1798–1879), French doctor and politician
- Ulysse Trélat (1828–1890), French surgeon

== See also ==
- Ulisse (given name), the Italian version of the name
- Ulisses, the Portuguese version of the name
- Ulises, the Spanish version of the name
- Ulysses (given name), the English version of the name
