= Ulixes =

Scientific classification
- Domain: Eukaryota
- Kingdom: Animalia
- Phylum: Arthropoda
- Class: Insecta
- Order: Hemiptera
- Suborder: Auchenorrhyncha
- Infraorder: Fulgoromorpha
- Family: Issidae
- Genus: Ulixes; Stål, 1861

Type species
- Ulixes marmoreus (Stål, 1861)

Genus of insects

Ulixes is a genus of planthoppers in the family Issidae, erected by Carl Stål in 1861. Species are native to Central America.

== Species ==
Fulgoromorpha Lists on the Web (FLOW) includes:

1. Ulixes cassidoides (Walker, 1858)
2. Ulixes horizontalis Caldwell, 1945
3. Ulixes intermedius Fowler, 1904
4. Ulixes marmoreus (Stål, 1861) - type species
5. Ulixes perpendicularis Caldwell, 1945
