= Ulysses (given name) =

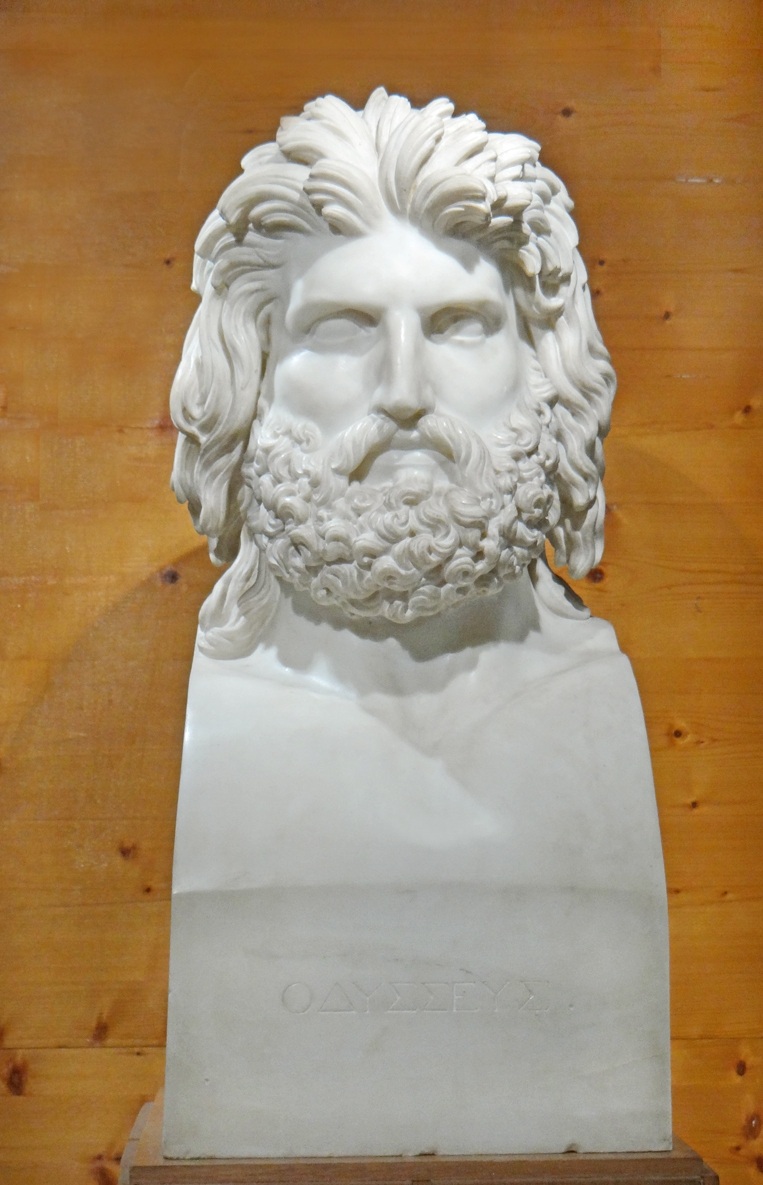
- Ulysses, the Latinized version of Odysseus. Marble bust sculpted by Pierre-Jean David in 1814
- Gender: Masculine

Origin
- Origin: Latin form of Odysseus
- Meaning: "Wrathful" "A Freak" (Klingon)

Other names
- Related names: Odysseus

Ulysses (/juːˈlɪsiːz/ yoo-LISS-eez, UK also /ˈjuːlɪsiːz/ YOO-liss-eez; Latin: Ulyssēs, Ulixēs) is one Latinized version of Odysseus. The name was made more famous in modern times by the American Civil War hero and eighteenth president of the United States, Ulysses S. Grant, by James Joyce's novel Ulysses, and the film of the same name.

== People named Ulysses ==
In the United States "Ulysses" is perhaps best known as the name of Ulysses S. Grant (1822–1885), the U.S. Army general and President of the United States. Many Americans born during or after the Civil War were named in his honour.

Other people with the name "Ulysses" include:

=== In arts and entertainment ===
- Ulysses Cuadra (born 1987), American actor
- Ulysses Davis (1872–1924), American film director
- Ulysses Davis (artist) (1913–1990), American artist
- Ulysses Dove (1947–1996), American choreographer
- Ulysses Kay (1917–1995), American composer
- Ulysses Livingston (1912–1988), American musician
- Ulysses Owens (born 1982), American musician
- Ulysses J. Lincoln Peoples (1865–?), American architect
- Ulysses Ricci (1888–1960), American sculptor
- Ulysses S. Grant Tayes (1885–1972), also known as U.S. Grant Tayes, African-American painter, musician, columnist
- Ulysses "Slow Kid" Thompson (1888–1990), American entertainer
- Ulysses Kae Williams (1921–1987), American radio personality

=== In law, politics, and military ===
- Ulysses N. Arnett (1820–1880), American politician in West Virginia
- Ulysses Burgh, 2nd Baron Downes (1788–1864), British Army general
- Ulysses G. Buzzard (1865–1939), U.S. Army soldier
- Ulysses Currie (1937–2019), American politician from Maryland
- Ulysses G. Denman (1866–1962), American politician from Ohio
- Ulysses Doubleday (general) (1824–1893), U.S. Army general
- Ulysses F. Doubleday (1792–1866), American politician from New York
- Ulysses S. Grant (1822–1885), the 18th President of the United States
- Ulysses S. Grant Jr. (1852–1929), American lawyer
- Ulysses S. Grant III (1881–1968), U.S. Army general
- Ulysses Grant-Smith (1870–1959), American diplomat
- Ulysses Samuel Guyer (1868–1943), American politician from Kansas
- Ulysses Hobbs (1832–1911), American politician from Maryland
- Ulysses Samuel Lesh (1868–1965), American politician from Indiana
- Ulysses Jones, Jr. (1951–2010), American politician from Tennessee
- Ulysses G. Lee (1913–1969), American soldier and academic
- Ulysses J. Lupien (1883–1965), American local government official
- Ulysses G. McAlexander (1864–1936), U.S. Army general
- Ulysses Mercur (1818–1887), American politician from Pennsylvania
- Ulysses Shelton (1917–1981), American politician from Pennsylvania
- Ulysses S. Webb (1864–1947), American politician from California

=== In science and medicine ===
- Ulysses Grant Bourne (1873–1956), American physician
- Ulysses Grant Dailey (1885–1961), American surgeon
- Ulysses S. Grant IV (1893–1977), American geologist
- Ulysses Prentiss Hedrick (1870–1951), American botanist
- Ulysses G. Weatherly (1865–1940), American sociologist

=== In sport ===
- Ulysses Bentley IV (born 2000), American football player
- Ulysses Brown (1920–1942), American baseball player
- Ulysses Coumier (c. 1905–?), American football player
- Ulysses Curtis (1926–2013), Canadian football player
- Ulysses Gomez (born 1983), Mexican-American mixed martial arts fighter
- Ulysses Lawrence (born 1954), Antiguan cricketer
- Ulysses Llanez (born 2001), American soccer player
- Ulysses S. McPherson, American football coach
- Ulysses Norris (born 1957), American football player
- Ulysses Reed (born 1959), American basketball player

=== Other people ===
- Ulysses Burgh (1632–1692), Irish Anglican bishop
- Ulysses Grant Groff (1865–1950), American philanthropist
- Ulysses Grant Baker Pierce (1865–1943), American Unitarian minister

== Fictional characters and objects ==
- Ulysses Bloodstone, Marvel Comics character
- Ulysses Moore, character in the book series of the same name
- Ulysses Paxton, character in The Master Mind of Mars, by Edgar Rice Burroughs
- Ulysses Klaue, Marvel Comics character
- Ulysses Trustable, a character in Ninjago
- Ulysses Macauley, character in The Human Comedy, by William Saroyan
- Ulysses, antagonist of Fallout: New Vegas's Lonesome Road DLC
- Ulysses 1994XF04, impactor asteroid from Ace Combat series, introduced in Ace Combat 04

== See also ==
- Odysseus, the main character of Homer's Odyssey, known as Ulysses in Latin
- Ulysse, the French version of the name
- Ulises, the Spanish version of the name
- Ulisses, the Portuguese version of the name
- Ulisse (given name), the Italian version of the name
