= Odysseus (disambiguation) =

Odysseus is a character in Greek mythology.

Odysseus may also refer to:

== Arts and entertainment ==
- Odysseus (oratorio), an 1873 secular oratorio by Max Bruch
- The Odyssey (TV miniseries) (1997)
- Odysseus (role-playing game), a 1980 role-playing game
- Odysseus (album), by Jesse Jagz, 2017

== Astronomy ==
- Odysseus (crater), a crater on Tethys, a moon of Saturn
- 1143 Odysseus, a Jupiter trojan in the Greek camp
- Odysseus (spacecraft), the lander for the IM-1 mission to the Moon in 2024

== People ==
- Odysseus Eskitzoglou (1932–2018), Greek sailor, 1960 Olympic champion in the Dragon boat class
- Odysseus Velanas (born 1998), Greek footballer
- Odysseus Yakoumakis (born 1956), Greek artist, painter and illustrator

== Other uses ==
- Odysseus (polychaete), a genus of polychaete worms, in the family Terebellidae
- Aurora Odysseus, a solar, High-Altitude Long Endurance drone
- ROV Odysseus 6K, a remotely operated underwater vehicle

== See also ==
- Odysseas Elytis, pen name of Odysseas Alepoudelis (1911–1996), Greek poet, man of letters, essayist and translator
- Ulysses (disambiguation), the Latin form of the name
- Ulysse (disambiguation), the French form of the name
- Ulisses, the Portuguese form of the name
- Ulises, the Spanish form of the name
