= Ulisses =

Ulisses is a Portuguese-language given name. It is the Portuguese form of the English name Ulysses, which itself derives from a Latin form of Odysseus (a legendary Greek king).

== People with the name ==
- Ulisses Soares (born 1958), Brazilian official in the Church of Jesus Christ of Latter-day Saints
- Ulisses Morais (born 1959), Portuguese footballer
- Ulisses Correia e Silva (born 1962), Prime Minister of Cape Verde
- Ulisses Braga Neto (born 1971), Brazilian academic
- Ulisses (footballer, born 1986), full name Ulisses Alves da Silveira, Brazilian football left-back
- Ulisses (footballer, born 1989), full name Ulisses Rocha de Oliveira, Brazilian football midfielder
- Ulisses Garcia (born 1996), Swiss footballer
- Ulisses (footballer, born 1999), full name Ulisses Wilson Jeronymo Rocha, Brazilian football defender

== See also ==
- Ulise, male given name
- Ulisse (given name), the Italian version of the name
- Ulises, the Spanish variant of the name
- Ulysse, the French variant of the name
- Ulysses (given name), the English variant of the name
