= Ulis =

Ulis may refer to:

== People ==
- Bujang Ulis (بوجڠ اوليس), Malaysian politician, and MP for Simunjan (federal constituency), deputy minister of education, deputy minister of plantation and commodities
- Eric Ulis, D.B. Cooper researcher
- Shareese Ulis, U.S. basketball player, a member of the 2009–10 Cincinnati Bearcats women's basketball team
- Tyler Ulis (born 1996), U.S. basketball player
- Ulis Williams (born 1941), U.S. Olympic athlete

== Places ==
- Les Ulis, Canton of Les Ulis, Palaiseau, Paris-Saclay, Essonne, Île-de-France, France; a commune
- Canton of Les Ulis, Palaiseau, Paris-Saclay, Essonne, Île-de-France, France; a canton

== Other uses ==
- CO Les Ulis, Les Ulis, Essonne, France; a soccer club
- Ulisses FC (Armenian: Ուլիս Ֆուտբոլային Ակումբ, romanized: Ulis Futbolayin Akumb, lit. 'Ulysses Football Club'), Yerevan, Armenia; a soccer club
- Unités localisées pour l'inclusion scolaire (ULIS; French: Localized Units for School Inclusion), disabled student education in France; see Disability in France
- ULIS, a French electronics manufacturer, who in 2019 merged with Sofradir to become Lynred
- University Library and Information Services (ULIS), Benue State University, Markudi, Benue, Nigeria
- ULIS Middle School, Vietnam National University, Hanoi, Vietnam

== See also ==
- Uli's Famous Sausage, Seattle, Washington, USA; a butcher shop
- Uli (disambiguation) for the singular of ULIs
- Ulises
