= Ulises =

Ulises is a Spanish-language given name. It is the Spanish form of the English name Ulysses, which itself derives from a Latin form of Odysseus (a legendary Greek king).

== People with the name ==
- Ulises Adame de León (born 1959), Mexican politician
- Ulises Blanch (born 1998), American tennis player
- Ulises Carrión (1941–1989), Mexican artist
- Ulises Aurelio Casiano Vargas (born 1933), Puerto Rican Catholic bishop
- Ulises Alfredo Castillo (born 1992), Mexican cyclist
- Ulises Dávila (born 1991), Mexican footballer
- Ulises de la Cruz (born 1974), Ecuadorian footballer
- Ulises Dumont (1937–2008), Argentine actor
- Ulises Francisco Espaillat (1823–1878), President of the Dominican Republic
- Ulises Estrella (1939–2014), Ecuadorian poet
- Ulises Hadjis, Venezuelan singer
- Ulises Heureaux (1845–1899), President of the Dominican Republic
- Ulises Jaimes (born 1996), Mexican footballer
- Ulises Mendivil (born 1980), Mexican footballer
- Ulises Pascua (born 1989), Argentine footballer
- Ulises Poirier (1897–1977), Chilean footballer
- Ulises Ramírez Núñez (born 1967), Mexican politician
- Ulises Ramos (1919–2002), Chilean footballer
- Ulises Rivas (born 1996), Mexican footballer
- Ulises Rosales del Toro (born 1942), Cuban politician
- Ulises Ruiz Ortiz (born 1958), Mexican politician
- Ulises Armand Sanabria (1906–1969), American inventor
- Ulises Saucedo (1896–1963), Bolivian footballer
- Ulises Segura (born 1993), Costa Rican footballer
- Ulises Solís (born 1981), Mexican boxer
- Ulises Tavares (born 1993), Mexican footballer
- Ulises Váldez (born 1948), Cuban cyclist
- Ulises Fariñas (born 1985), American Comic book artist

== Animals with the name ==
- Ulises (orca)

== See also ==
- Ulis (disambiguation)
- Ulise, male given name
- Ulisse (given name), the Italian variant of the name
- Ulisses, the Portuguese variant of the name
- Ulysse, the French variant of the name
- Ulysses (given name), the English variant of the name
