= Gullas =

Gullas is a surname. Notable people with the surname include:

- Eduardo Gullas (1930–2025), Filipino politician
- Gerald Anthony Gullas Jr. (born 1984), Filipino politician
- Paulino Gullas (1891–1945), Filipino lawyer, newspaper publisher, and politician
- Vicente Gullas (1888–1970), Filipino writer, lawyer, and educator
