= Mabuhi! =

Signature song of Gwendolyn Garcia

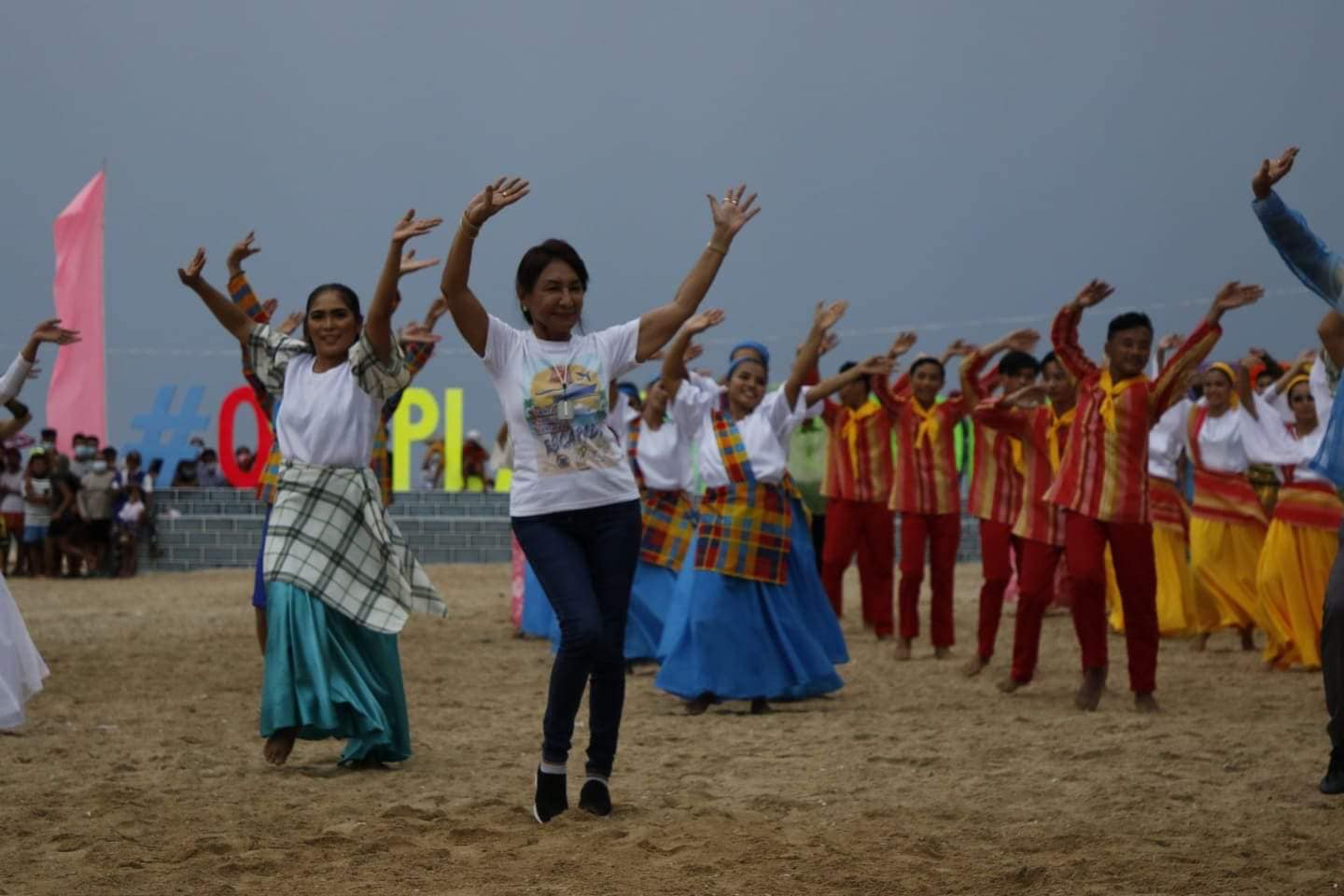
Gwendolyn Garcia dancing to "Mabuhi!" at the 2020 Suroy Suroy Sugbo SMB (Santa Fe, Madridejos, Bantayan) Escapade in Madridejos on November 27, 2020

"Mabuhi!" (Cebuano for 'long live'; cf. "mabuhay"), also known as "Mabuhi Ka, Sugbuanon" ("Long Live, Cebuano"), is a song written and composed by Filipino musician Paul Melendez. Often played and danced to at festivals throughout the province of Cebu, including at the Sinulog Festival, it is the signature song of the administration of Gwendolyn Garcia as the Governor of Cebu.

== Composition and content ==
"Mabuhi!" has been described as having a lively, marching-band–like pace, with the song's lyrics encouraging Cebuanos to enjoy life, as well as to be proud of their heritage.

== Performance ==
As Garcia's signature song, "Mabuhi!" is regularly played at events where she is present, particularly when the event is held at the Cebu Provincial Capitol. Playing the song is taken as an indication that she has arrived at a particular public event, although it has been played to welcome other dignitaries. Notably, the song was played to welcome Agnes Magpale, a political rival who was serving as acting governor of Cebu while Garcia was suspended from the position, upon her arrival in San Fernando on January 23, 2013. This changed during the governorship of Hilario Davide III, Magpale's successor and another political rival of Garcia, where the song was intermittently played but was not used to welcome guests or to open events.

In addition to being used for welcoming dignitaries, "Mabuhi!" has also been more broadly used to welcome arriving visitors, as well as being regularly performed by the Dramatics and Cultural Ensemble of the University of San Jose–Recoletos at local and international events.

The song has an associated dance, and Garcia has danced to the song during her governorship. "Mabuhi!" has also been danced to using other festivals' dances, although it has also been performed without the dance.

== Reception ==
Reception to "Mabuhi!" has been mixed, although Melendez, the song's composer, was recognized for his composition by Tomas Osmeña, the mayor of Cebu City, as an awardee at the city's 2007 Charter Day celebrations.

Use and performance of the song has elicited more polarized reaction. Writing in The Freeman, columnist Archie Modequillo credits the song for changing his mother's attitude toward Garcia after she had seen her dance to it during an official event where she was in attendance, describing "Mabuhi!" as the anthem of her administration. Garcia's dancing has also been generally received positively by the public. On the other hand, broadcaster and journalist Leo Lastimosa, also writing in The Freeman, criticized Garcia's use of the song as indicating she has "Imelda syndrome".

== See also ==
- "Sugbo", the provincial anthem of Cebu
