= 2022 Talisay, Cebu, local elections =

Election in Talisay City (Cebu), Philippines on 2022

2022 Talisay City mayoral election
← 2019	May 9, 2022	2025 →
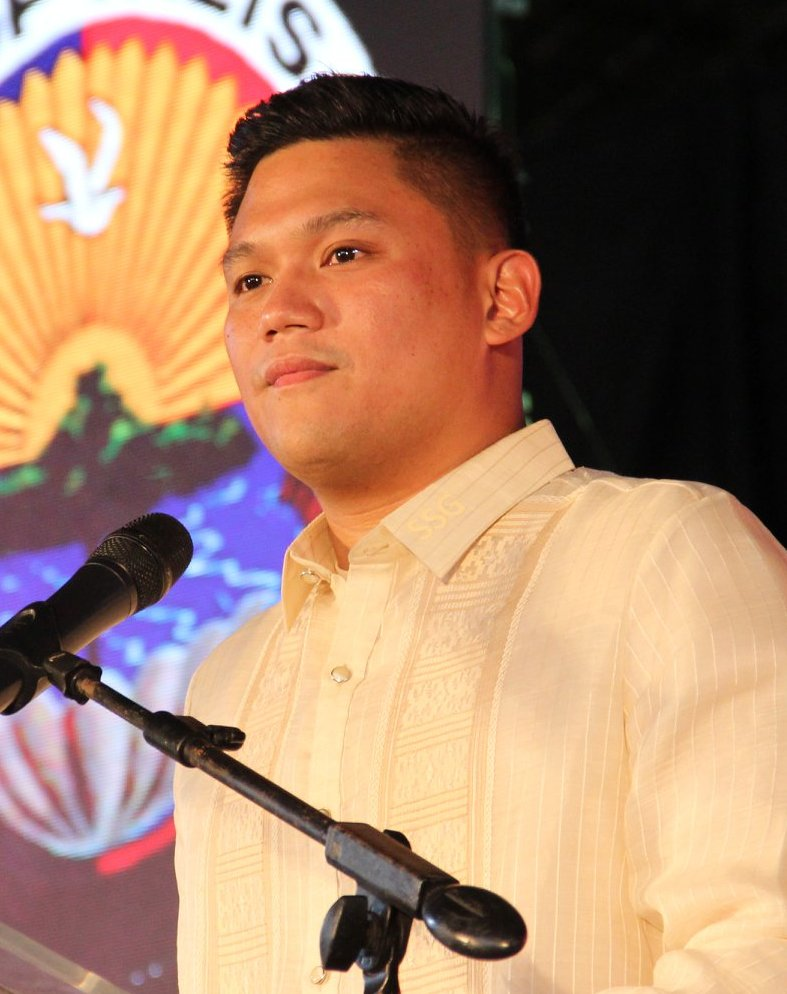
		PDR
Nominee	Gerald Anthony Gullas Jr.	Alan Bucao
Party	Nacionalista	Reporma
Running mate	Richard Francis Aznar	Rico Almaria
Popular vote	93,701	31,277
Percentage	74.97	25.03
Mayor before election
Gerald Anthony Gullas Jr.
Nacionalista Party
Elected mayor
Gerald Anthony Gullas Jr.
Nacionalista Party

Local elections were held in Talisay City on May 9, 2022 within the Philippine general election. Registered voters of the city will be electing candidates for the following elective local posts: mayor, vice mayor, and ten councilors.

== Mayoral election ==
Incumbent mayor Gerald Anthony Gullas Jr. is vying for a second term. He is running against incumbent vice mayor Alan Bucao.

Talisay City mayoral election
Party	Candidate	Votes	%
Nacionalista	Gerald Anthony Gullas Jr.	93,701	74.97
Reporma	Alan Bucao	31,277	25.03
Total votes		124,978	100.00
Margin of victory		62,424	49.94

== Vice mayoral election ==
Incumbent vice mayor Alan Bucao is running for mayor thereby making it an open seat. Former city councilor Richard Francis Aznar and former Tabunok barangay councilor aspirant Rico Almaria will compete for the seat.

Talisay City Vice mayoral election
Party	Candidate	Votes	%
Nacionalista	Richard Francis Aznar	89,109	78.08
Reporma	Rico Almaria	25,009	21.92
Total votes		114,118	100.00
Margin of victory		64,100	56.16

== City Council elections ==
Party	Seats
Aksyon Demokratiko	–
Nacionalista Party	10
Partido para sa Demokratikong Reporma	–
Independent	–
Ex officio seats	2
Total	12

Incumbents are expressed in italics.

=== By ticket ===
==== Nacionalista Party/Team Alayon, Team Aksyon Agad ====
#	Name	Party
2.	Alito Bacaltos	Nacionalista
3.	Marc Arthur Bas	Nacionalista
5.	Danilo Caballero	Nacionalista
6.	Rodolfo Cabigas	Nacionalista
8.	Manuel Cabriana	Nacionalista
9.	Lester Daan	Nacionalista
13.	Eduardo Gullas III	Nacionalista
20.	Ferdinand Rabaya	Nacionalista
21.	Gail Restauro	Nacionalista
25.	Ofelia Ylanan	Nacionalista

==== Partido para sa Demokratikong Reporma/Barug Lumad Talisaynon ====
#	Name	Party
7.	Jarred Cabilte	Reporma
10.	Gilbert Dela Serna	Reporma
11.	Clifford Delos Reyes	Reporma
12.	Aldin Diaz	Reporma
14.	Ignacio Luis Jordana	Reporma
15.	Ellen Lastimosa	Reporma
16.	Lina Libres	Reporma
17.	Rogerico Lopernes	Reporma
19.	Bernard Joseph Odilao	Reporma

==== Aksyon Demokratiko ====
#	Name	Party
22.	Herbert Ruiz	Aksyon

==== Independent ====
#	Name	Party
1.	Ariel Araw-Araw	Independent
18.	Rolando Miaga	Independent
23.	Reynaldo Salon	Independent
24.	Antonio Vargas	Independent

=== By candidate ===
City Council election at Talisay City
Party	Candidate	Votes	%
Nacionalista	Eduardo Gullas III	76,758	58.82
Nacionalista	Manuel Cabriana	70,611	54.11
Nacionalista	Rodolfo Cabigas	69,955	53.61
Nacionalista	Danilo Caballero	66,678	51.10
Nacionalista	Marc Arthur Bas	63,249	48.47
Nacionalista	Ferdinand Rabaya	62,808	48.13
Nacionalista	Alito Bacaltos	61,895	47.43
Nacionalista	Gail Restauro	61,804	47.36
Nacionalista	Lester Daan	61,237	46.93
Nacionalista	Ofelia Ylanan	56,534	43.32
Reporma	Aldin Diaz	46,091	35.32
Independent	Ariel Araw-Araw	45,548	34.90
Reporma	Ignacio Luis Jordana	34,052	26.09
Reporma	Clifford Delos Reyes	29,226	22.40
Reporma	Bernard Joseph Odilao	28,281	21.67
Reporma	Ellen Lastimosa	28,168	21.59
Reporma	Jarred Cabilte	26,292	20.15
Reporma	Lina Libres	26,134	20.03
Reporma	Rogerico Lopernes	21,028	16.11
Reporma	Gilbert Dela Serna	20,536	15.74
Aksyon	Herbert Ruiz	12,915	9.90
Independent	Antonio Vargas	4,858	3.72
Independent	Rolando Miaga	3,946	3.02
Independent	Reynaldo Salon	3,418	2.62
Total votes		982,022	100.00

Party	Votes	%	Seats
Nacionalista Party	651,529	66.35	10
Partido para sa Demokratikong Reporma	259,808	26.46	0
Independent	57,770	5.88	0
Aksyon Demokratiko	12,915	1.32	0
Total	982,022	100.00	10
