= Paulino Gullas =

Filipino lawyer and politician

The Honourable Paulino Arandia Gullas
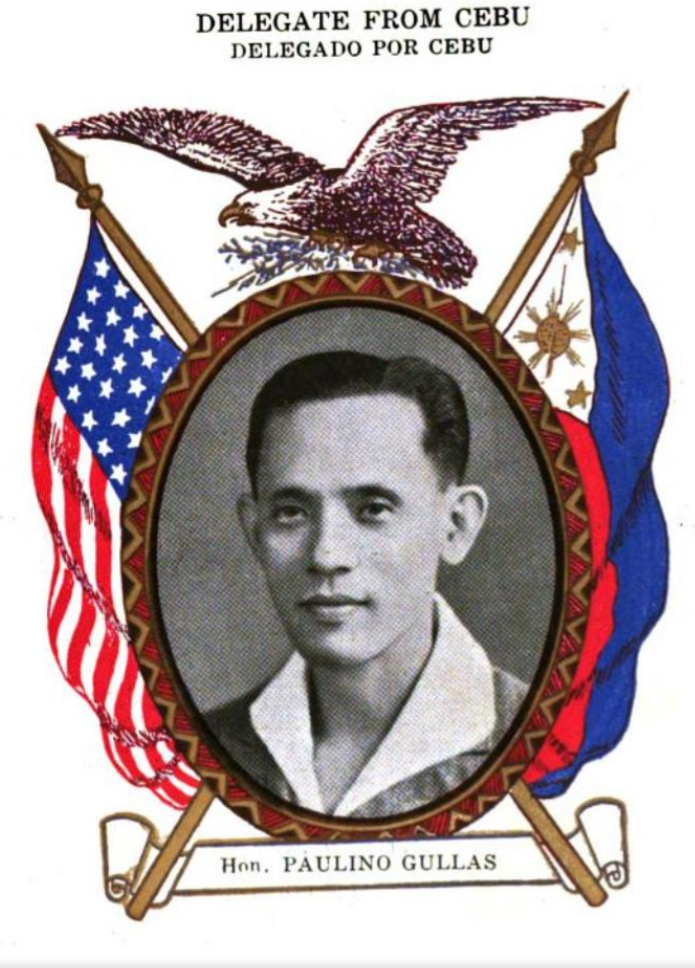
- Photograph published c. 1935

Member of the National Assembly from Cebu City
- In office 25 September 1943 – 2 February 1944 Serving with Juan C. Zamora

Delegate to the 1934 Constitutional Convention
- In office 30 July 1934 – 8 February 1935

Member of the House of Representatives of the Philippine Islands from Cebu's 2nd District
- In office June 2, 1925 – June 5, 1928
- Preceded by: Vicente Sotto
- Succeeded by: Sotero Cabahug

Personal details
- Born: 29 April 1891 Cebu, Captaincy General of the Philippines
- Died: 1945 (aged 53–54) Cebu City, Philippine Commonwealth
- Party: KALIBAPI (1942-1945); Nacionalista (1925-1942)
- Spouse: Gilda Kilayko Gullas (+)
- Children: 3
- Education: Colegio de San Carlos; University of the Philippines
- Occupation: Lawyer; Publisher; Poet

Paulino Arandia Gullas (29 April 1891 – 1945) was a Filipino Visayan lawyer, newspaper publisher, and legislator from Cebu, Philippines. He was the founder of The Freeman, Cebu's longest-running newspaper, served as member of the 7th Philippine Legislature for Cebu's 2nd district (1925–1927), Delegate to the 1934 Constitutional Convention, and member of the National Assembly during World War II.

== Education and personal life ==
Paulino Gullas was born in the then-town of Cebu on 29 April 1891. He was the son of Heminigildo Gullas and Necifora Arandia. He is the younger brother of Vicente Gullas and uncle of Eduardo and Jose Gullas. He attended Cebu Primary School, Colegio de San Carlos, Cebu Normal School, Cebu High School, and Manila High School.

He was known to be an orator during his student days at the University of the Philippines where he acquired his law degree. He also became the first business manager of Philippine Law Journal, a publication established in the University of the Philippines in 1914. When he passed the bar exams in 1916, he earned the highest marks among all examinees, becoming the first bar topnotcher from Cebu.

Married to Gilda Kilayko from Bacolod, Negros Occidental, he had three children namely Mary, Cecilia and Victoria.

== Career ==
Paulino A. Gullas established a law office that handled cases from different parts of the country. His law firm's partners included congressman Pedro Lopez and Jose Leuterio, who would later become an associate justice of the Court of Appeals.

=== Journalism ===
He started as a reporter of Cablenews American, a Manila-based newspaper.

He is the founder of The Freeman, Cebu's longest-running newspaper. Its maiden issue was printed on 10 May 1919. The newspaper stopped circulation on the outbreak of World War II. Jose Gullas, revived the periodical in 1965 as a weekly magazine and then to a daily English newspaper in 1969.

=== Education ===
From 1918 until 1919, he was chosen as the first registrar of the University of the Philippines Cebu. He was also the president of the Visayan Institute, a school founded by his brother Vicente.

=== Literature ===
According to Resil Mojares' book Cebuano Literature, Paulino wrote poems and used the pen name Paul Dantes.

=== Politics ===
He was voted member of the House of Representatives in 1925 until 1928 for the old 2nd district of Cebu, which was composed of Cebu City and the towns of Mandaue, Consolacion, Liloan, Compostela, Cordova and Opon. In 1934, he was elected as delegate to the Constitutional Convention to draft the 1935 Philippine Constitution.

== World War II ==
Paulino Gullas was forced to serve in the government during the Japanese occupation in World War II. He was the commissioner for the Visayas chapter of KALIBAPI, a political party formed during the war. He wrote the paper, "The Delicate Japanese-Filipino Problem", where he advised the Japanese to refrain from slapping Filipinos as slap to the face was considered abusively demeaning. Moreover, he intervened and helped release Irish confreres of the Redemptorists.

Additionally, he was a delegate to the National Assembly formed in 1943, representing the city of Cebu.

There are various accounts on his demise before the war ended. It is said that he was executed by the Japanese forces in the hills of Cebu. Another account claimed that together with war-time governor, Jose S. Leyson, and other Cebu officials, he was taken to the Babag Ridge area together with the retreating Japanese military and was killed when the Americans bombed the cave in which they were hiding.

Stories from his surviving relatives revealed that, while forced to serve the Japanese, Paulino Gullas was secretly leaking intel to the Cebuano guerillas. When the Japanese military discovered such treachery, they hunted him down but were unsuccessful since he was able to hide in a secret underground room located near a well beside his house. It was only when the Japanese threatened to kill his wife and daughters that Paulino Gullas surrendered to himself to the Japanese forces. He was eventually executed and his remains have never been found.

== Historical commemoration ==
- The University of Visayas College of Law was renamed Gullas Law School in his honor.
- On 4 April 1960, the street known previously as Calle Nueva was renamed Don Paulino Gullas Street in his honor by virtue of City Council Ordinance No. 285.
