= The Freeman (newspaper) =

Daily newspaper published in Cebu, Philippines

- Fair and Fearless

- Front page on June 25, 2015
- Type: Daily newspaper
- Format: Broadsheet and news website
- Owner(s): Philstar Daily Inc. MediaQuest Holdings (51%); Belmonte Family (21%); Private stock (28%)
- Founder: Paulino Gullas
- Publisher: Jose "Dodong" Gullas
- Editor-in-chief: Achilles Modequillo
- Managing editor: Lucky Malicay
- Founded: May 10, 1919; 107 years ago (39,204 issues)
- Political alignment: Independent
- Language: English, Cebuano
- Headquarters: Philippine STAR Building; V. Gullas Street corner D. Jakosalem Street, Cebu City, Philippines
- City: Cebu City
- Country: Philippines
- Sister newspapers: Banat, The Philippine Star, BusinessWorld, Pilipino Star Ngayon, Pang-Masa, Starweek
- Website: www.philstar.com/the-freeman

The Freeman is a daily English-language newspaper published in Cebu, Philippines. It is the longest-running newspaper in Cebu, first published on May 10, 1919. Since 2004, the newspaper has been published by the Philstar Media Group, publisher of the Manila-based newspaper, The Philippine STAR, with former owner Jose "Dodong" Gullas retaining editorial control over the newspaper. The motto of the newspaper is "Fair and fearless".

== History ==
=== Background ===
The Freeman's beginnings can be traced back to the American colonial era in the Philippines from 1898 to 1946. At the time, the Americans had just granted the Filipino people several civil and political rights, including freedom of the press, which encourage several enterprising individuals to establish various newspapers in English and the local languages.

In Cebu, several local newspapers emerged, such as the first Cebuano-owned newspapers La Justicia (1899) and El Nacional (1899), owned by politician, lawyer and journalist Vicente Sotto. He and his brother Filemon went on to establish other newspapers such as El Pueblo (1900), Ang Suga (1901–12), Ang Kaluwasan (1902–10), and La Revolucion (1910–41).

Other scions of political families also followed suit and published their own newspapers, such as Sergio Osmeña’s El Nuevo Dia (1900–03), Mariano Cuenco's El Precursor (1907–41) and El Boletin Catolico (1915–30), and Vicente Rama's La Nueva Fuerza/Bag-ong Kusog (1915–40). Other newspapers include La Epoca (1922), owned by Jewish entrepreneur Leopoldo Falek, and the Catholic newspapers Ang Camatuoran (1902–11) and Atong Kabilin (1916).

=== Early years ===
Inspired by the success of earlier newspapers and the increasing popularity of the English language among locals, lawyer, journalist and scion of the Gullas political family, Paulino Gullas, decided to establish his own newspaper. A former correspondent for the Manila-based newspaper The Cablenews-American, Paulino published the first issue of the English-language newspaper The Freeman on May 10, 1919.

The newspaper was first published at its office along P. Lopez Street corner Colon Street in Cebu City, before moving to an office at the corner of Juan Luna and Colon Streets later on. The maiden issue consisted of 16 pages: 12 in English and four in Visayan. The next six issues equally divided its pages between English and Visayan sections. Over the years, the number of pages varied from 18, 20, 22, 24, 28, 40 and 32.

The release of The Freeman soon gave rise to other English-language newspapers in Cebu, namely Jose Avila's The Advertiser (1922), Mariano Cuenco's Cebu Daily News, Leopoldo Falek's Star (1927), Vicente Rama's Progress (1928), Cesar Mercader's The Cebu Herald (1938), Cornelio Faigao's The Challenger (1940), Pete Calomarde's Morning Times (1943), and Alfredo Cruz and Angel Anden's The Pioneer Press (1945).

The Freeman became an important mouthpiece for the Gullas political family and was essential in Paulino's election as representative of Cebu City's Second District in the House of Representatives from 1925 to 1927. However, the newspaper temporarily ceased publication in 1934 after Paulino was elected as Cebu's delegate to the 1934 Constitutional Convention from July 30, 1934, to February 8, 1935, that created the Commonwealth of the Philippines.

The newspaper was not able to return to publication with the outbreak of World War II and the Japanese bombardment of Cebu in 1941. Paulino later joined the Kapisanan sa Paglilingkod sa Bagong Pilipinas (KALIBAPI), the only Filipino political party recognized by the Japanese Military Administration and became commissioner of its Visayas chapter. This led to his appointment as member of the National Assembly from 1943 to 1944 during the Second Philippine Republic.

=== Post-war revival ===
With Paulino's death during the American bombardment of Cebu in 1945, The Freeman would not return to newsstands until 1965 when his nephew Jose "Dodong'" Gullas revived the periodical as a weekly magazine, and then as a daily English newspaper in 1969. Dodong sought the advice of his father Vicente Gullas and Paulino's widow Hilda in reviving the paper. He also hired journalists Balt Quinain and Juanito Jabat to manage the paper, with Dodong serving as publisher, Quinain as editor-in-chief, and Jabat as associate editor.

=== Martial law ===
After dictator Ferdinand Marcos placed the entire Philippines under martial law in 1972, The Freeman and its printing press were shut down for a month, and one of its columnists, Resil Mojares (who would eventually be recognized as a National Artist of the Philippines for Literature) was jailed for several months because he had published columns which criticized the administration of dictator Ferdinand Marcos.

The Freeman was able to return to publication after a month, and was among the few Philippine community newspapers that remained in circulation and dared to publish news and accounts about the excesses and abuses of the regime.

=== Establishment of Banat ===
On August 23, 1994, The Freeman began publishing the Cebuano-language tabloid Banat as demand for printed news and content in the local language surged. In 2019, Banat celebrated 25 years in circulation as Cebu's leading tabloid newspaper in the local language.

=== Acquisition by the Philstar Media Group and by Mediaquest Holdings ===
The Freeman is currently owned and operated by the Philstar Media Group, publisher of the Manila-based, nationally circulated broadsheet The Philippine STAR. The media company, which is owned by the Belmonte family, acquired the newspaper along with its sister publication Banat on August 24, 2004, as part of its strategy of acquiring community newspapers to expand its reach and influence throughout the Philippines.

In 2014, Philstar Media Group was acquired by Mediaquest Holdings Inc., the media conglomerate of PLDT chairman and CEO Manuel V. Pangilinan, making The Freeman and Banat part of the MVP Group of Companies along with other publications such as The Philippine STAR, Pilipino Star Ngayon, Pang-Masa, Starweek and BusinessWorld.

Aside from print, The Freeman also has an online presence via The Philippine STAR's website, as well as in social media. In January 2011, the newspaper opened its official Facebook page, followed by a Twitter page in March. On May 10, 2019, The Freeman celebrated its 100th founding anniversary.

== Awards ==
In its more than a century of operation, The Freeman has received several accolades from different award-bodies due to its excellent reportage. The newspaper is a consistent award winner in various categories of the Philippine Press Institute (PPI) Civil Journalism Community Press Awards since its inception in 1996. The newspaper has won Best in Business and Economic Reporting (1996), Best in Photojournalism (1996, 1998, 2009), Best in Newspaper Design (1996, 1998), Best in Science and Technology Reporting (1996), Best Edited Newspaper (1998), Best in Environmental Reporting (1997, 2015), Best in Fisheries Reporting (2015), Best in Cultural-Historical Reporting (1998) and Best Editorial Page (1998, 2016). In 1999, PPI placed The Freeman in the awards' Hall of Fame for raking in numerous awards for three consecutive years.

The Freeman was also named by the Rotary Club of Manila as the Best Regional Newspaper in 2014, 2015, 2017, and 2018. It has also received accolades from the Cebu Archdiocesan Mass Media Awards for Photojournalism (2017) and Column Writing (2011, 2015).

In 2018, it received three Gawad Tugas awards—Environmental Story of the Year, Environmental Journalist of the Year, and Environmental Publisher of the Year—from the Department of Environment and Natural Resources Region 7.

== Notable columnists ==
- Jose Gullas, current chairman and CEO of The Freeman and nephew of its founder Paulino Gullas
- Josephus Jimenez, lawyer, author and former undersecretary of the Department of Labor and Employment
- Leo Lastimosa, TV and radio personality, former anchorman of TV Patrol Central Visayas
- Cherry Piquero-Ballescas, sociologist and retired professor at the University of the Philippines Diliman
- Korina Sanchez, TV and radio personality, former anchorwoman of TV Patrol

== See also ==
- Cebu Daily News
- SunStar Cebu
- The Philippine Star
