= Cebu City's at-large congressional district =

Former congressional district in the Philippines

Cebu City's at-large congressional district was the city-wide electoral district in Cebu City, Philippines. It elected representatives at-large to the Batasang Pambansa from 1984 to 1986 and earlier to the National Assembly from 1943 to 1944.

The district was first formed ahead of the 1943 Philippine legislative election following the ratification of the Second Philippine Republic constitution which called for a unicameral legislature composed of delegates from all provinces and chartered cities in the country. Cebu, a chartered city since 1937, elected Paulino Gullas to the National Assembly, who was joined by then-mayor Juan C. Zamora as an appointed second delegate. The district became inactive following the restoration of the House of Representatives in 1945 when the city reverted to its old provincial constituency of Cebu's 2nd congressional district. In the unicameral Batasang Pambansa that replaced the House in 1978, Cebu City was included in the multi-member regional electoral district of Region VII (Central Visayas) for its interim parliament. The district was again utilized in the 1984 Philippine parliamentary election when Cebu City was granted two seats in the regular parliament as a highly urbanized city.

After 1986, Cebu City elected its representatives from two single-member congressional districts drawn under a new constitution.

== Representation history ==
#	Term of office		National Assembly	Seat A				Seat B			
#	Start	End	National Assembly	Image	Member	Party	Electoral history	Image	Member	Party	Electoral history
=== Cebu City's at-large district for the National Assembly (Second Philippine Republic) ===
District created September 7, 1943.
–	September 25, 1943	February 2, 1944	1st		Paulino Gullas	KALIBAPI	Elected in 1943.		Juan C. Zamora	KALIBAPI	Appointed as an ex officio member.
District dissolved into Cebu's 2nd district.
#	Term of office		Batasang Pambansa	Seat A				Seat B			
#	Start	End	Batasang Pambansa	Image	Member	Party	Electoral history	Image	Member	Party	Electoral history
=== Cebu City's at-large district for the Regular Batasang Pambansa ===
District re-created February 1, 1984.
–	July 23, 1984	March 25, 1986	2nd		Antonio Cuenco	UNIDO	Elected in 1984.		Marcelo Fernan	UNIDO	Elected in 1984.
District dissolved into Cebu City's 1st and 2nd districts.

== See also ==
- Legislative districts of Cebu City
