= Talisay City Science High School =

Public high school in Cebu, Philippines

- Mataas na Paaralang Pang-Agham ng Lungsod ng Talisay (Filipino)

Location
- Talisay City, Cebu, Philippines
- Coordinates: 10°14′41″N 123°50′40″E

Information
- Type: Secondary Public Science High School
- Grades: 7 to 10

The Talisay City Science High School (Filipino: Mataas na Paaralang Pang-Agham ng Lungsod ng Talisay) is a public science high school system located in Cabaidog building, Jose Rizal Street, Poblacion, Talisay City, Cebu, Philippines. It was founded on June 7, 2004, and previously occupied the city college building. Currently it has its 3-9 building. It is a DepEd-recognized (Region VII -Central Visayas Division of Talisay City) Regional Science High School as a zone of peace (DepEd Order No. 44, s. 2005) under its head teacher Froilan "Froy" Delos Santos.

In August 2024, Talisay Mayor Samsam Gullas handed over to TCSHC the P3 million Interactive Laboratory with experiment apparatus, “Learnytic Multimedia Kit”, robotics facility and an 85-inch computer monitor. The school introduced robotics subject in grade 8 following the victory of its 4 students in the Summer Robot Games International Open and Youth Robotics Convention 2024.
