= Sugbo (hymn) =

Provincial Anthem of Cebu

- Provincial Anthem of Cebu
- Also known as: Sugbo Hymn
- Lyrics: Dr. Susana Cabahug; Rogelio Serna
- Music: Angel Cabilao
- Adopted: October 2, 2006

Audio sample
- "Sugbo", performed by the Capitol Choir: file; help

"Sugbo", also known as the Sugbo Hymn, is the official hymn of the province of Cebu in the Philippines.

== History ==
The hymn was composed by Dr. Susana Cabahug and Rogelio Serna, and arranged by Angel Cabilao. It was adopted by the Cebu Provincial Board with the passage of Provincial Ordinance No. 2006–10 on October 2, 2006.

In 2010, then Provincial Board member Julian Daan proposed and was able to secure the approval of a resolution mandating public elementary and high schools within the province to sing the hymn after the Philippine national anthem during the flag ceremony. Daan observed that despite the passage of the said ordinance in 2006, its implementation was not strictly followed. It was also proposed by Provincial Board member Miguel Antonio Magpale in 2015 to promote the singing of the hymn in official functions, gatherings and activities of the province's local government units to "strengthen the sense of community among the province's residents."

On August 6, 2019, the hymn was used during the raising of the provincial flag along with the flags of its towns and cities on the occasion of the province's 450th founding anniversary led by Governor Gwendolyn Garcia together with provincial officials, police and military officials, Cebu City vice mayor Michael Rama and Davao City mayor Sara Duterte.

== Lyrics ==
Official Cebuano version	Literal English translation
Sugbo, harang kapupud-an sa habagatan, Kinapusurang lalawigan sa kabisay-an Sa kaalam adunahan Sa among gugma ug dungog kanunay'ng halaran. Sugbo, unang binunyagan sa Kristohanong tinuho-an Gipanalipdan kanunay ni Señor Santo Niño, Makasaysayanon, maabi-abihon, madanihon Ug angay ka gayud nga ipasigarbo. Sugbo, pinangga sa klima ug panahon, Kalinaw, kauswagan — palungtaron, palambuon Bisan asa modangat sa among pagpaningkamot Ikaw amo kanunay nga handumon, Ikaw amo kanunay nga handumon! O Sugbo!	Cebu, queen archipelago of the south, Centermost province in the Visayas Abundant in knowledge We will always dedicate our love and reputation. Cebu, first baptized by the Christian faith Always protected by Señor Santo Niño, Historic, welcoming, captivating And you truly deserve to be proud. Cebu, blessed by its climate and weather, Peace and progress — let it endure and thrive Wherever we reach in our endeavors We will always remember you, We will always remember you! Oh Cebu!

== See also ==
- "Mabuhi!", the signature song of Gwendolyn Garcia and described as the "anthem" of her administration
