= DYAB-AM =

Defunct radio station in Cebu City, Philippines

DYAB
- Mandaue–Cebu City; Philippines
- Broadcast area: Central Visayas and surrounding areas
- Frequency: 1512 kHz

Programming
- Format: Silent

Ownership
- Owner: ABS-CBN Corporation
- Sister stations: DYLS-FM, DYCB-TV, DYAC-TV

History
- First air date: 1957
- Last air date: May 5, 2020 (radio); August 28, 2020 (as TeleRadyo Cebu)
- Former call signs: DYCB-AM (1957–1963); DYEE-AM (1963–1972)
- Former names: DYCB (1957-1963); DYEE (1963-1995); DYAB (1995-2020)
- Former frequencies: 570 kHz (1957–1972)
- Call sign meaning: ABS-CBN; Abante pa Bisaya

Technical information
- Licensing authority: NTC

TeleRadyo Cebu
- Country: Philippines
- Broadcast area: Cebu

Programming
- Languages: Cebuano, Filipino
- Picture format: 480i (SDTV)

Ownership
- Owner: ABS-CBN Corporation

Final logo.

DYAB (1512 AM) was a radio station formerly owned and operated by ABS-CBN Corporation. The station's studio and office were located at the ABS-CBN Broadcasting Complex, North Road, Brgy. Jagobiao, Mandaue, while its transmitter was located at Brgy. Cogon Pardo, Cebu City. DYAB originally operated on a 24-hour, 7-day schedule from its inception in 1995.

Similar to Manila-based DZMM (which is now operated under the ownership of Philippine Collective Media Corporation), DYAB also had a television channel on Sky Cable named DYAB TeleRadyo Cebu where the studio and hosts of its programs can be seen by its listeners and viewers. Selected programs of DZMM were also aired on the station.

On May 5, 2020, the station permanently suspended its broadcasting activities, following the cease-and-desist order issued by the National Telecommunications Commission due to the expiration of ABS-CBN's legislative license to operate. On May 8, 2020, most of its programming resumed via online feed and through TeleRadyo Cebu. On August 28, 2020, TeleRadyo Cebu signed off for the last time. The hosts and staff of the station launched Sibya TV on September 1, 2020.

== Notable anchors ==
- Leo Lastimosa
- Jun Tariman
- June Perez
- Ferdinand Mañus
- RC Dalaguit
- Angie Saniel
- Jenny Rica Vidad
- Jeffrey Astillo
- Atty. John Dx Lapid
- Atty. JT Benz
- Atty. Joselito "Boy" Alo
- Atty. Galicano "Jun" Arriesgado Jr.
- Atty. Pat Acabodillo
- Atty. Ina Magpale
- Rhea Soco
- Edison delos Angeles
- Najib Cubio
- Juve Villar
- Bob Malazarte
- Dave Tumulak
- Edgar Escalante
- Edgar Gutierrez
- Marlon Bellita
