= University of San Jose–Recoletos =

Roman Catholic university in Cebu City, Philippines

- Unibersidad sa San Jose–Recoletos (Cebuano); Pamantasan ng San Jose–Recoletos (Filipino); Unversidad de San Jose–Recoletos (Spanish)
- USJ-R official seal
- Other names: San Jose, Recoletos de Cebu
- Former names: Colegio de San Jose–Recoletos (1947–1984)
- Motto: Caritas et Scientia; Adelante!
- Motto in English: "Charity and Science"
- Type: Private, Co-educational, Research university
- Established: 1947; 79 years ago
- Founder: Order of Augustinian Recollects
- Religious affiliation: Roman Catholic (Augustinian Recollect)
- President: Eduardo S. Celiz Jr., OAR
- Undergraduates: 15,000
- Postgraduates: 2,000
- Location: Cebu City, Cebu, 6000, Philippines; 10°17′38″N 123°53′51″E
- Campus: Urban; Main Campus; Corner Magallanes and P. Lopez Streets, Cebu City Satellite Campuses; N. Bacalso Avenue, Barangay Basak Pardo, Cebu City; Barangay Arpili, Balamban, Cebu
- Language: English, Filipino, Cebuano, Spanish
- Newspaper: Forward Publications & The Josenian Premier
- Alma Mater Song: USJ-R Alma Mater Hymn (Forward Radiant Children)
- Colors: Green and Gold
- Nickname: Josenians
- Sporting affiliations: CESAFI
- Mascot: Jaguar
- Website: www.usjr.edu.ph
- Location in the Visayas Location in the Philippines

The University of San Jose–Recoletos, also referred to by its acronym USJ–R or to its colloquially shortened name San Jose, is a private Catholic research and coeducational basic and higher education institution run by the Order of Augustinian Recollects in Cebu City, Cebu, Philippines. It was founded by the Augustinian Recollects in 1947. From classes held in an old building and a portion of a convent, the school built modern structures while retaining classic features.

The university has three campuses. Two of which are located in different areas of Metro Cebu – the main campus along Corner P. Lopez and Magallanes Streets while the Basak Campus is at Cebu South Road, Basak Pardo, Cebu City. Its third campus, the Balamban Campus, is located in Arpili, a barangay in the Municipality of Balamban (in the province of Cebu).

== Background ==
=== History ===
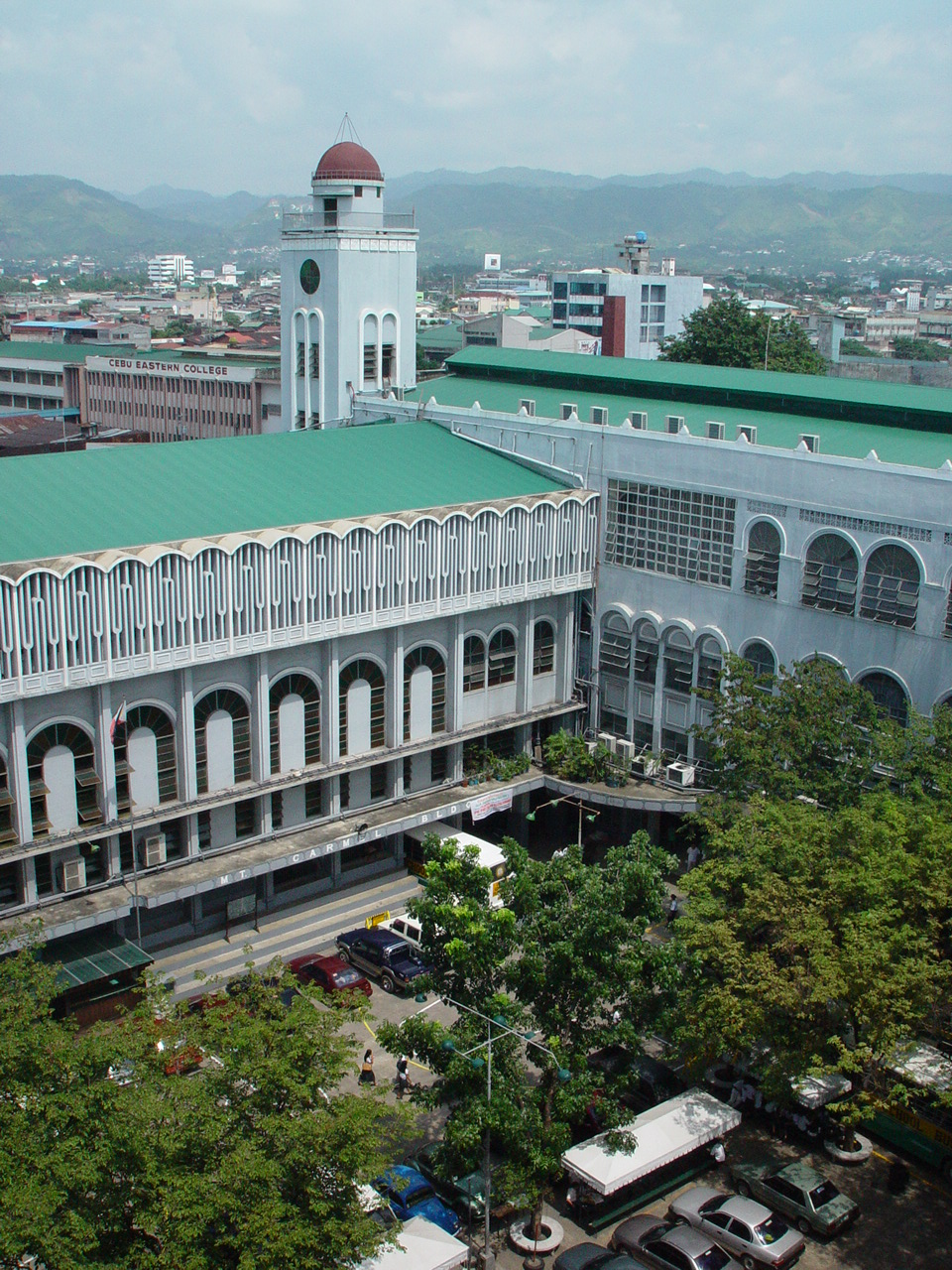
A top view image of USJ-R main campus

Established by the Order of Augustinian Recollects in Cebu City in 1947, the then Colegio de San Jose - Recoletos held classes in a portion of a convent, which can be traced back on 1621, and in an old building. On July 25, 1948, CSJ-R's second year marked the blessing of the college building in the then Carmelo Street, now Leon Kilat Street. With the rise of the new building, collegiate courses were offered. Liberal Arts, Education, Commerce, Secretarial, Vocational courses and Pianoforte were the first set of courses offered by CSJ-R in the college level.

The Augustinian Recollects decided to construct a new college building designed by architects Imelda Borromeo and Mariano Monasque. The new San Nicolas Building fronting Plaza Washington (now Freedom Park), was inaugurated on July 25, 1950. The year 1950 also witnessed another milestone in education, breaking free from the old system, the school adopted the system of departmentalized colleges appointing one dean for each college.

In 1955, another structure was added to the ever-expanding CSJ-R, the San Agustin Hall was inaugurated on August 28, 1955. Responding to the needs of the ever-increasing student population, the San Agustin Hall Annex was conceived and later inaugurated on March 19, 1960.

In the year 1965, the Iglesia de la Inmaculada Concepcion, also known as the Iglesia de los Padres Agustinos Recoletos, was demolished after thorough and emotionally charged deliberations as the conservatives of the church fought for its preservation. On the foundations of the old church, a new church would rise and would become known as the Church of Our Lady of Mt. Carmel and was finally blessed on March 18, 1966.

Tragedy struck in March 1967, bringing with it a conflagration which destroyed parts of Colegio de San Jose. The Augustinian Recollects were quick to address this occurrence and by the year 1969, a six-storey building along P. Lopez Street was constructed giving rise to what is now known as the San Jose Building.

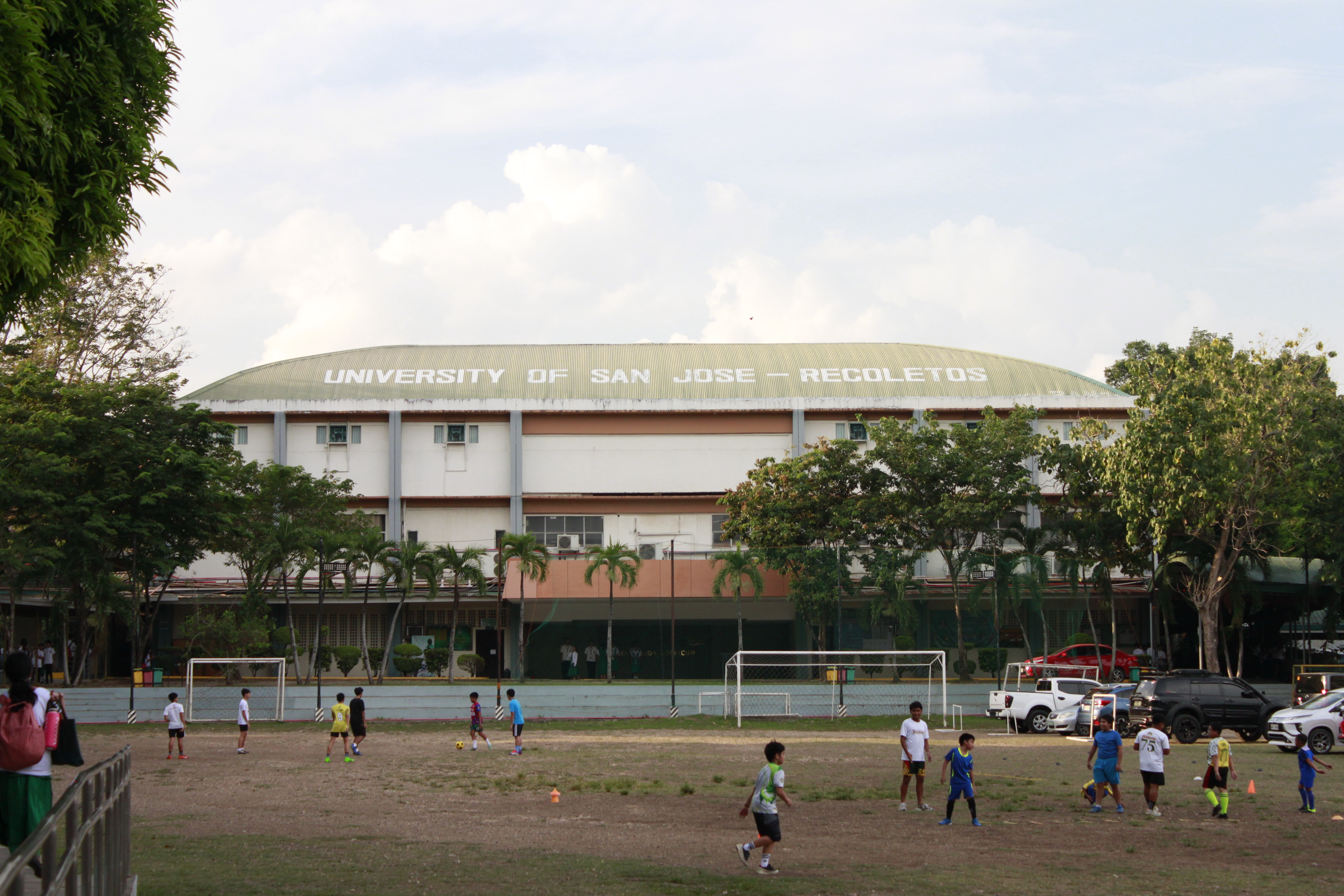
The Recoletos Coliseum in Basak Campus

In 1980, CSJ-R bought a new site in Basak Pardo, Cebu City, then built the new building for the grade and high schools, the Recoletos Coliseum, Open Gymnasium and the Pope Paul II Retreat House. In 1996, the Talavera House of Prayer was built in the scenic hills of Quiot Pardo, Cebu City.

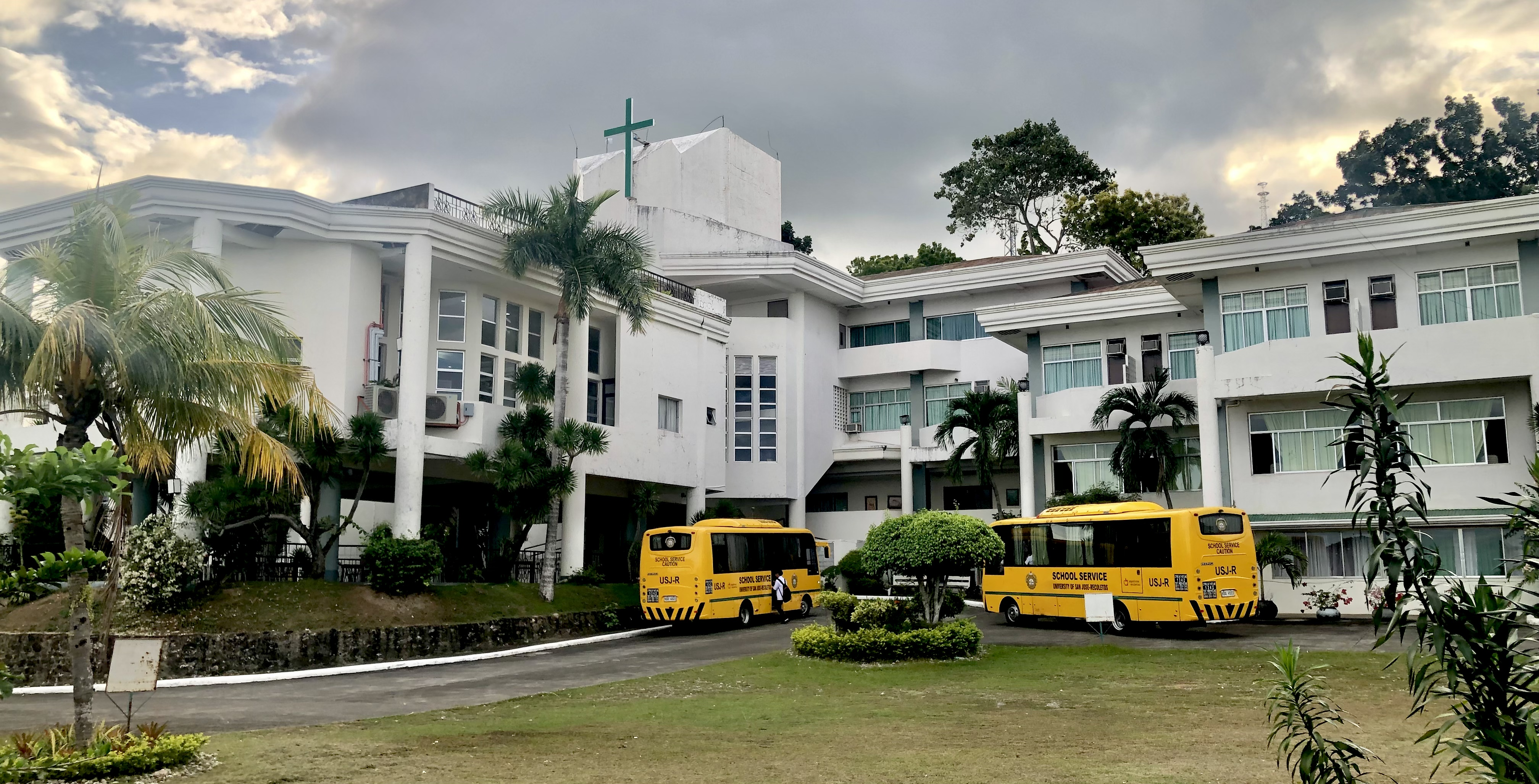
Talavera House of Prayer

June 13, 1981, marked the completion of the CSJ-R Basak Campus; right before achieving university status, school year 1982–1983 saw the transfer of the elementary and high school departments to the CSJ-R Basak Campus. Roughly three years later, the Recoletos Coliseum (now fully air-conditioned) was completed, making June 1984 a significant date for sports enthusiasts.

On September 21, 1984, CSJ-R attained university status. Spanning years of accreditation and re-accreditation, USJ-R, PAASCU Level 3, was granted Autonomous by CHED in 2001.

The curricular programs of USJ-R evolved from traditional to innovative course offerings: Arts and Sciences (started as liberal arts in 1947); Commerce and Education (founded in 1948); Engineering (1961); Bachelor of Laws (1957); and the Graduate School (1962). In 2003, the College of Information, Computer and Communications Technology was created. The Expanded Tertiary Education Equivalency and Accreditation Program (ETEEAP) followed in the same year. On April 1, 2004, the Vertical Alignment of the undergraduate and graduate schools took effect which established five graduate schools: Graduate School of Business and Management, Graduate School of Arts and Sciences, Graduate School of Information Technology and Computer Studies, Graduate School of Education and Graduate School of Engineering.

In June 2004, the B.S. in Nursing started its first operation due to the huge demand of nurses at the time. The university's College of Nursing held its 1st Capping, Badge Investiture and Candle Lighting Ceremony in June 2006 at the Recoletos Coliseum, Basak Campus.

The colonnaded, arched facade of the University of San Jose–Recoletos Main Campus gives a strong Romanesque appeal

Part of USJ-R's campaign is the provision of infrastructures and facilities to aid learning. Thus the rise of many school buildings like the Nursing Skills Laboratory, the St. Ezekiel Moreno Building, the International Language Center, the Recoletos Law Center, and the LET and CPA Review Centers were taken into place.

In 2006, the St. Ezekiel Moreno Building was completely established in the Basak Campus exclusive for the College of Information, Computer and Communications Technology (CICCT) and the College of Education (COE).

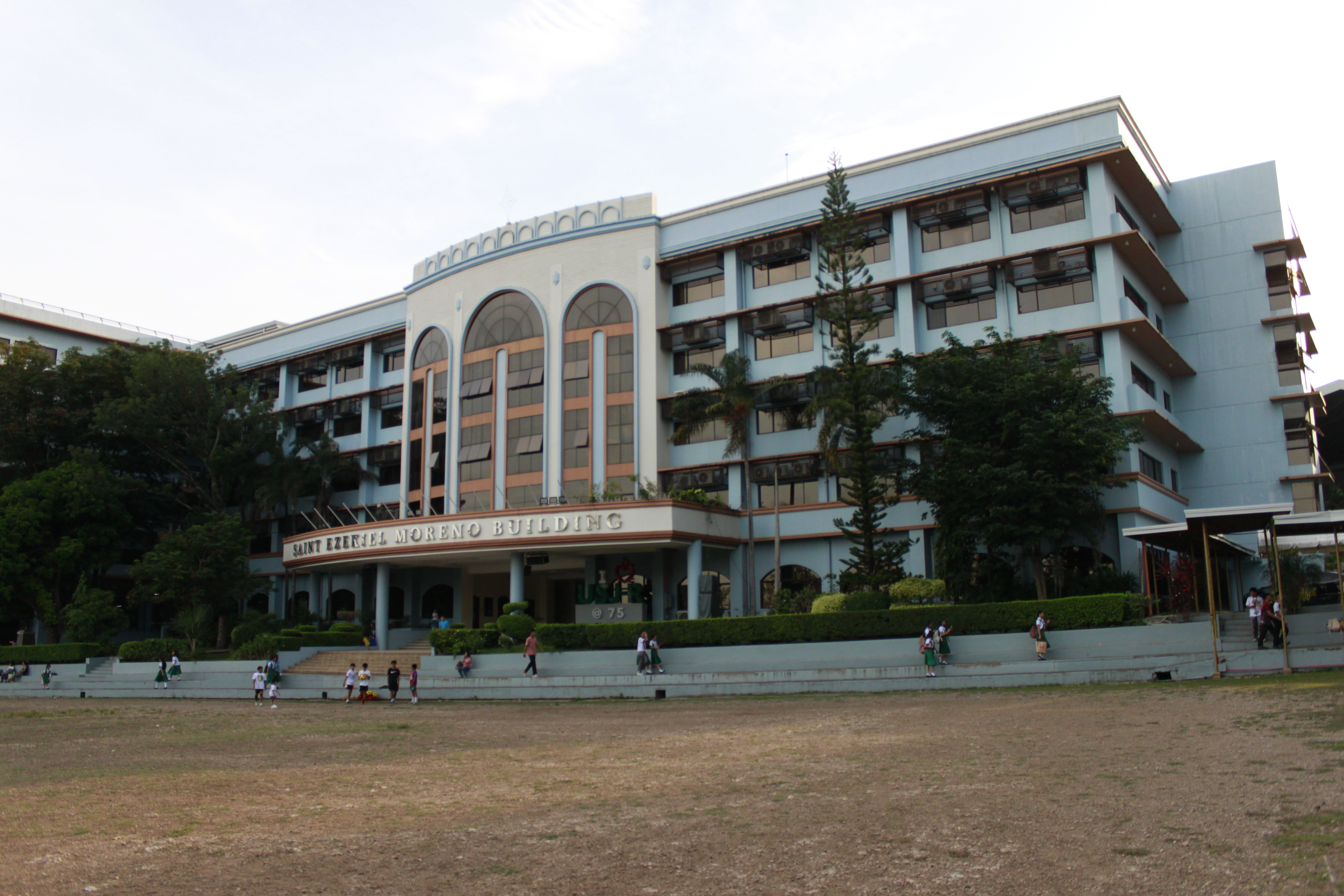
USJ-R Basak Campus (St. Ezekiel Moreno Building)

USJ-R had also opened some of the latest programs: Doctor of Philosophy in English, Master of Arts in Education major in Guidance and Counseling, Master of Media Studies with specialization in Broadcast Media and Journalism, Bachelor of Arts in International Studies, Diploma in advance program in Special Education and the English Language Program for foreign and Filipino students.

The years that followed gave the school opportunities to expand. On November 28, 1998, the 52nd General Chapter held in Granada, Spain, voted for the creation of a new Religious Province in the Philippines dedicated to St. Ezekiel Moreno, OAR. The Recollect Philippine Province, where USJ-R belongs, now stands as the eighth regional cluster of communities of the Order of Augustinian Recollect worldwide.

Furthermore, the USJ-R partnered with the Cebu Industrial Park Developers, Inc. and Tsuneishi Heavy Industries Inc., in the establishment of USJ-R Balamban Campus in the Municipality of Balamban, Cebu and inaugurated on June 22, 2009.

In 2019, the school bought a property in Ormoc City and plans for constructing a campus there are on the talks. If pushed through, it would be the first campus of the institution to be situated outside the island of Cebu.

In 2022, the University of San Jose–Recoletos secured a prestigious victory at the Philippine Startup Challenge 7, hosted by the Department of Information and Communications Technology. This marked the first championship win for Region 7 in this competition. The winning team, known as Team SUGOD, included students Daryll A. Gomez, Enrica Jules P. Carpena, and Carl Benedict T. Garces. They developed an innovative mobile application named 91Watch, an emergency hailing platform that uniquely incorporates mesh networking technology. This feature ensures continued communication even in scenarios where traditional communication networks fail completely.

== Academics ==
The academic and curricular programs below are offered by the different colleges of the university, the following are :

- Basic education:
  - Pre-school
  - Grade school (Grades 1–6)
  - Junior high school (Grades 7–10)
  - Senior high school (Grades 11–12)
- Baccalaureate/undergraduate programs and Graduate school:
  - School of Arts and Sciences
  - School of Business and Management
  - School of Education
  - School of Engineering
  - School of Computer Studies
  - School of Allied Medical Sciences
- Law:
  - School of Law
- TESDA-accredited programs:
  - Recoletos Industrial and Technological Training Center (RITTC)

== Campuses ==
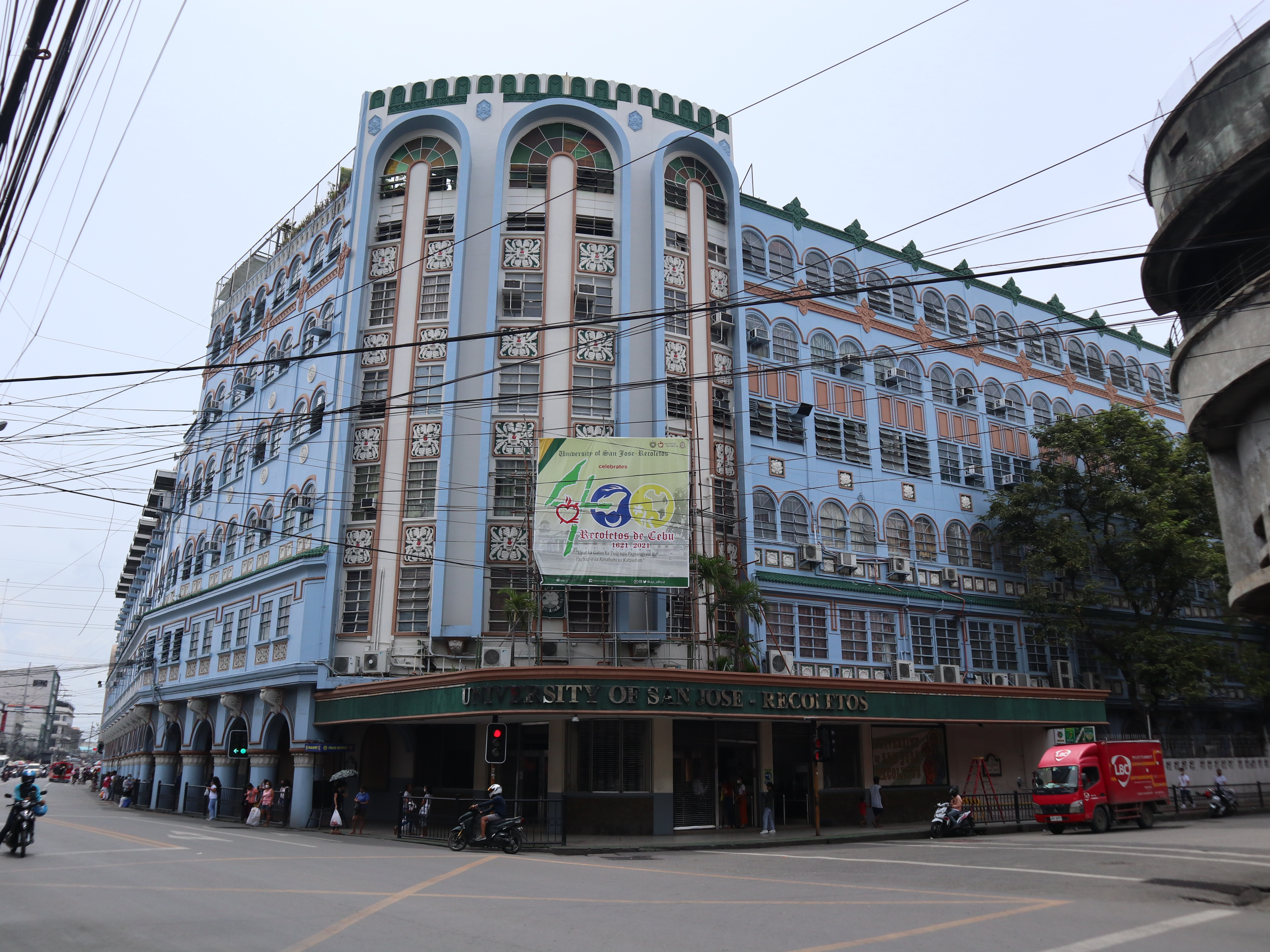
Façade of USJ-R Main Campus

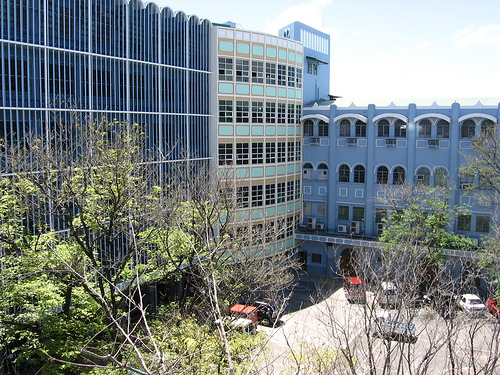
Inside USJ-R Main Campus showing the San Jose Bldg. (left) and San Nicolas Bldg. (right)

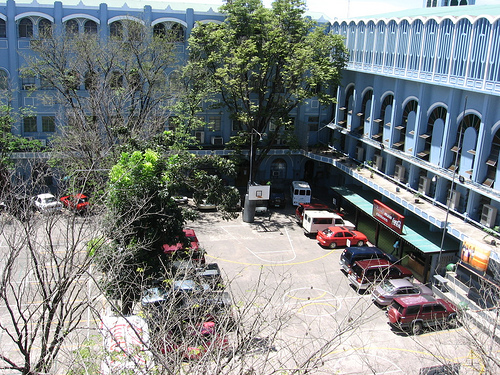
Inside the main campus showing the mini parking lot

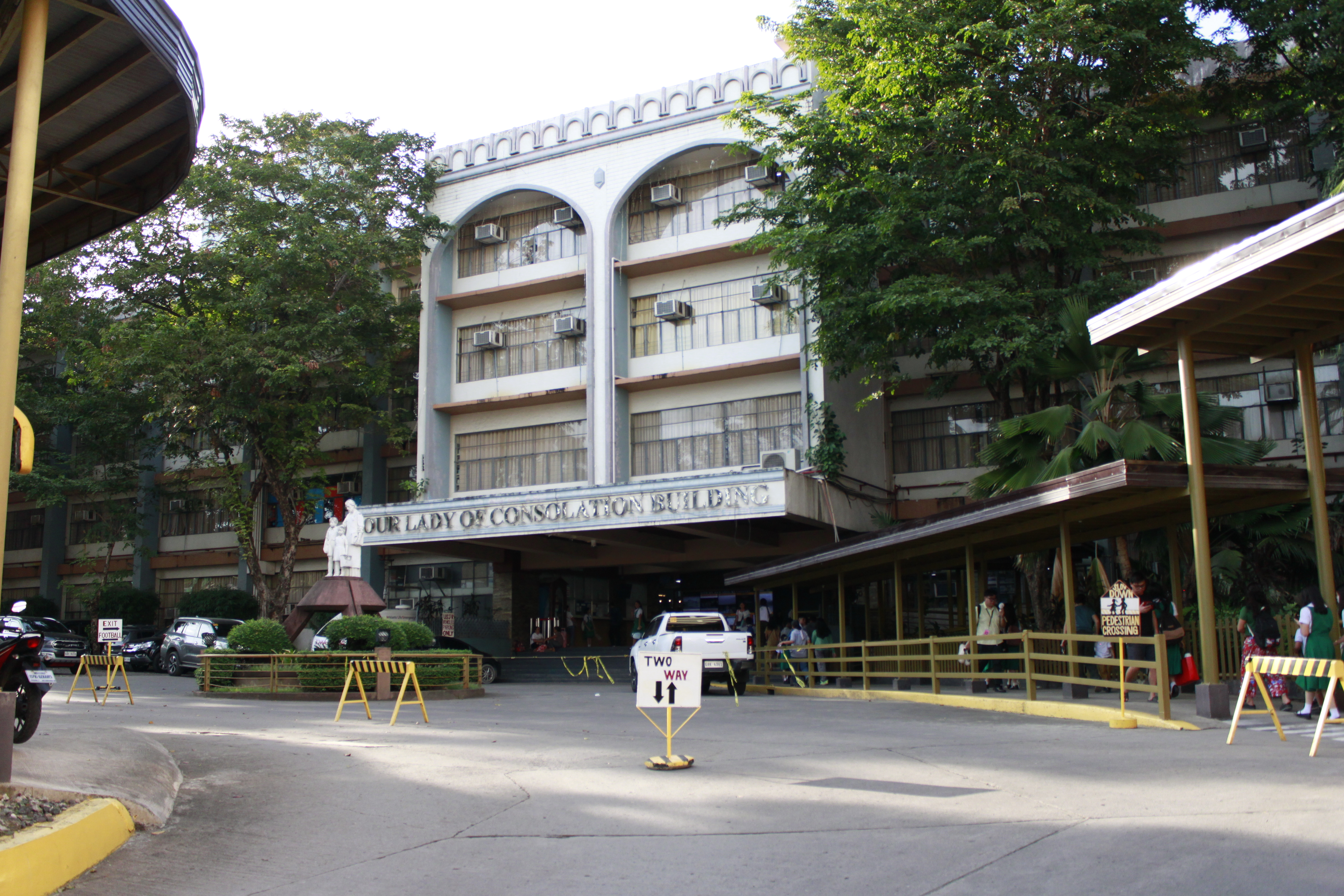
Our Lady of Consolation Building in Basak (Grade School - Junior High School)

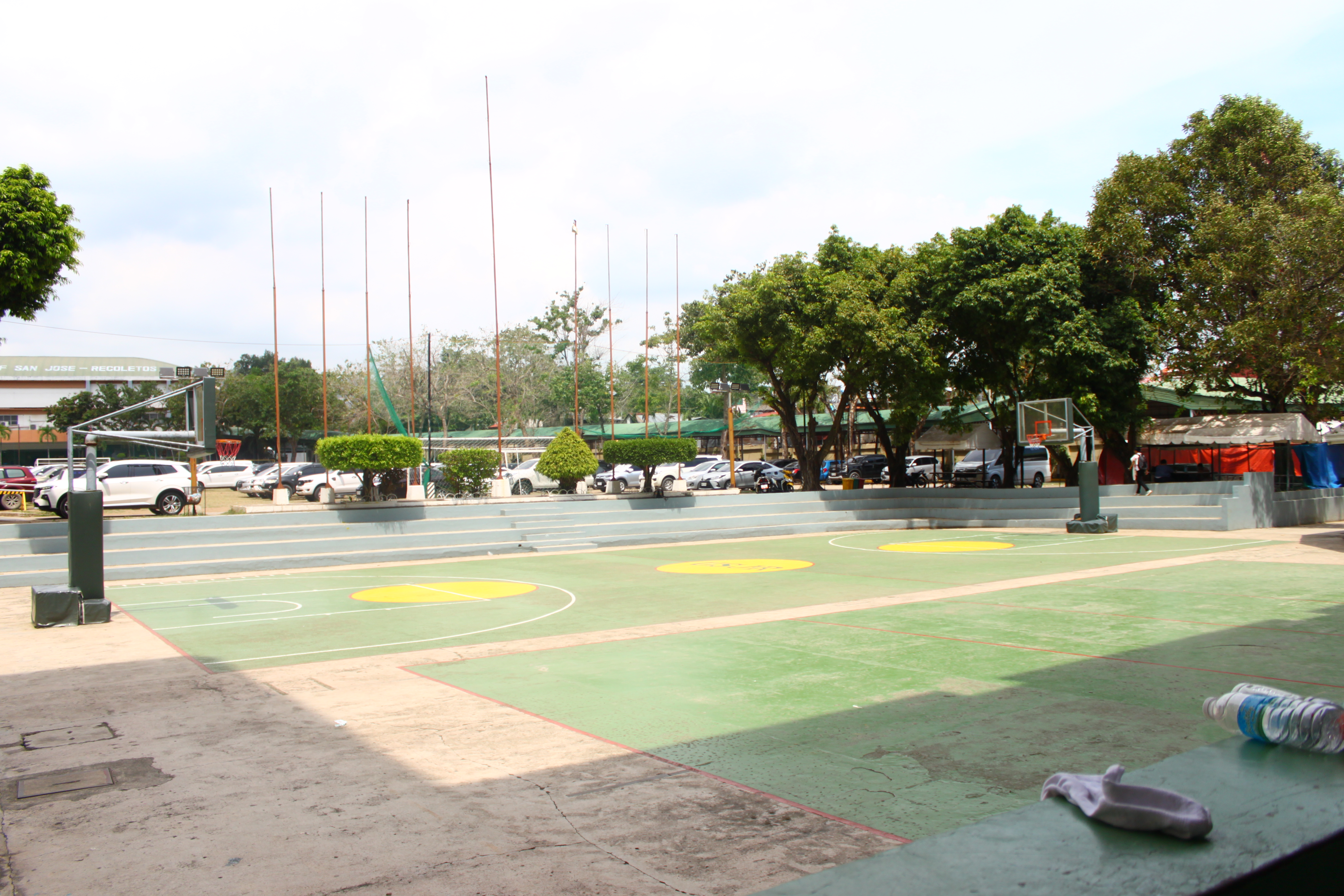
USJ-R Basak Amphitheater

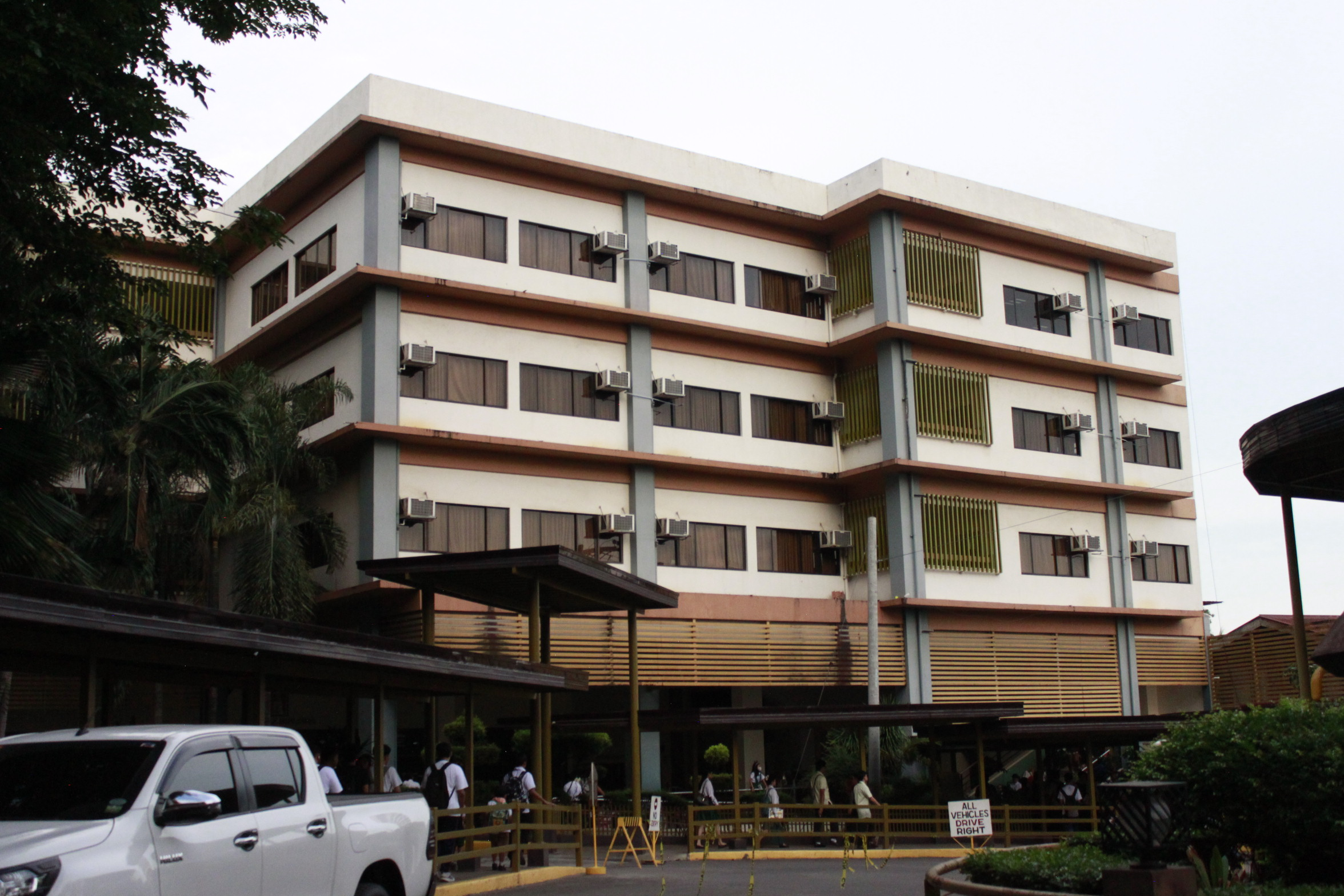
USJ-R Basak St. Pius X Building

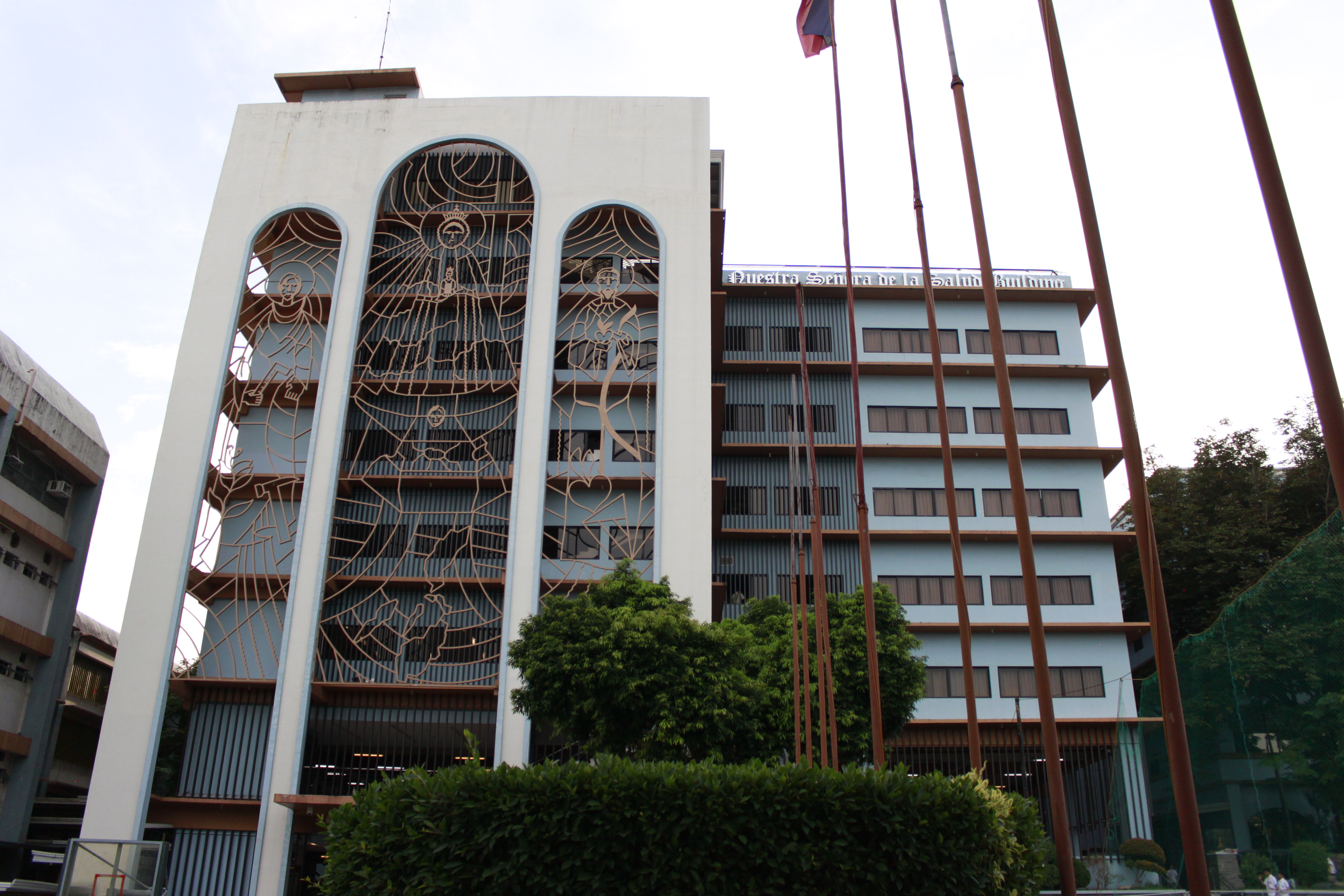
USJ-R Basak Nuestra Señora de la Salud Building

=== Main Campus ===
Location: Corner P. Lopez and Magallanes Sts., Cebu City, Cebu, Philippines

Departments and Colleges: School of Arts & Sciences; School of Business and Management; School of Engineering; School of Allied Medical Sciences; School of Law; Senior High School

Buildings

- San Jose Building
- San Agustin Building
- San Nicolas Building
- Mount Carmel Building

=== Basak Campus ===
Location: N. Bacalso Ave. (Cebu South Road), Basak Pardo, Cebu City, Cebu, Philippines

Departments and Colleges: Basic Education Department; Senior High School; School of Education; School of Computer Studies; RITTC

Buildings

- St. Pius X Building
- Our Lady of Consolation Building
- Saint Ezekiel Moreno Building
- Nuestra Señora de la Salud Building
- The Recoletos Coliseum

USJ-R's Basak Campus houses the Recoletos Coliseum and a soccer field. Intramural events are mostly done in Basak Campus. The soccer field also serves as marching and demonstration ground for boy scouts, girl scouts, and students undergoing civic welfare and reserve officers training.

=== Balamban Campus ===
Location: Arpili, Balamban, Cebu, Philippines

Departments and Colleges: Basic Education Department; Senior High School; RITTC

The Balamban Campus hosts a gymnasium, a separate building for the chapel and another for the auditorium. A swimming pool and open gym were also constructed. In addition to this, an exclusive dormitory named The Nicopolis was constructed in the Balamban Campus. Buildings for the high school, grade school and potential college departments were also constructed.

== Order of Augustinian Recollects (OAR) sister schools ==
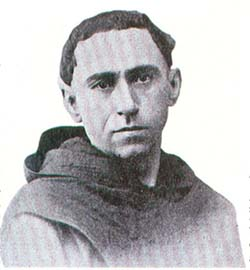
St. Ezekiel D. Moreno, OAR, USJ-R's patron saint

- San Sebastian College–Recoletos (Manila)
  - San Sebastian College–Recoletos, Canlubang, Canlubang satellite campus (Calamba, Laguna)
- University of Negros Occidental – Recoletos (Bacolod)
- San Sebastian College–Recoletos de Cavite
- Colegio de Santo Tomas – Recoletos (San Carlos City, Negros Occidental)
- Colegio de San Pedro–Recoletos (Poblacion, Valencia, Negros Oriental)
- San Pedro Academy–Recoletos (Caidiocan, Valencia, Negros Oriental)
- Colegio San Nicolas de Tolentino–Recoletos (formerly UNO-R High School Talisay Branch) (Talisay City, Negros Occidental)

=== Seminary and Formation Houses ===
- Santo Tomas de Villanueva Recoletos Formation House (High School) (San Carlos City, Negros Occidental)
- Casiciaco Recoleos Seminary (formerly Seminario Mayor - Recoletos de Baguio) (Philosophy) (Baguio)
- Recoletos Formation Center (Theology) (Mira-Nila Homes, Quezon City)

== Notable alumni ==
- Isabelo "Jojo" Lastimosa, Jr. – former professional basketball player and currently an assistant coach on PBA
- Luke Mejares – singer; studied AB English major in Marketing Studies
- Jamie Herrell – studied Mass Communication (Miss Earth 2014)
- Gazini Ganados – studied Tourism Management (Miss Universe Philippines 2019)
- Isabel Oli – actress; studied Information Technology
- Diva Montelaba – actress; studied Tourism Management
- Akiko Solon – singer-actress; studied Mass Communication
- Anna Fegi – singer; studied Mass Communication
- Beatrice Gomez – studied Mass Communication (Miss Universe Philippines 2021)
- Leo Lastimosa – studied Political Science; tri-media journalist
- Abet Guidaben – former PBA player; 2 time most valuable player; member PBA 25 Greatest Players
- Rolando "Klarex" A. Uy – Mayor of Cagayan de Oro (2022-present) and Cagayan de Oro 1st district representative (2007-2010, 2013-2022); B.S. Business and Finance
- Matteo Guidicelli – actor; studied Marketing Management
