= Eduardo Gullas =

Filipino politician (1930–2025)

The Honourable Eduardo Gullas
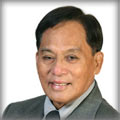
- Official portrait, 2010

House Majority Leader
- In office January 2, 2000 – November 13, 2000
- Preceded by: Mar Roxas
- Succeeded by: Bella Angara

Member of the Philippine House of Representatives from Cebu
- In office June 30, 2019 – June 30, 2022
- Preceded by: Gerald Anthony V. Gullas, Jr.
- Succeeded by: Rhea Mae Gullas
- Constituency: 1st District
- In office June 30, 2004 – June 30, 2013
- Preceded by: Jose R. Gullas
- Succeeded by: Gerald Anthony V. Gullas, Jr.
- Constituency: 1st District
- In office June 30, 1992 – June 30, 2001
- Preceded by: Antonio Bacaltos
- Succeeded by: Jose R. Gullas
- Constituency: 1st District
- In office December 30, 1969 – September 23, 1972
- Preceded by: Ernesto H. Bascón
- Succeeded by: Post abolished Post later held by Pablo Garcia
- Constituency: 3rd District

Mayor of Talisay, Cebu
- In office June 30, 2016 – June 30, 2019
- Preceded by: Johnny V. de los Reyes
- Succeeded by: Gerald Anthony V. Gullas, Jr.
- In office June 30, 2001 – June 30, 2004
- Preceded by: Socrates Fernandez
- Succeeded by: Socrates Fernandez

20th Governor of Cebu
- In office January 1, 1976 – March 26, 1986
- Vice Governor: Vacant (1976–1980); Ramon Durano III (1980–1984); Beatriz Durano-Calderon (1985–1986)
- Preceded by: Osmundo G. Rama
- Succeeded by: Osmundo G. Rama

Personal details
- Born: Eduardo Rivera Gullas; October 13, 1930 Philippine Islands
- Died: November 6, 2025 (aged 95) Cebu City, Cebu, Philippines
- Party: Nacionalista (1969–1972; 2004–2025); Alayon (local party; 1986–2025)
- Other political affiliations: 1CEBU (2018–2025); KAMPI (2007); PROMDI (1998–2001); Lakas (1995–1998); NPC (1992–1995)
- Spouse: Norma Selma-Gullas
- Relations: Gerald Anthony Gullas, Jr. (grandson); Jose R. Gullas (brother); Paulino Gullas (uncle)
- Children: 2
- Parent: Vicente Gullas (father)
- Education: University of the Visayas
- Occupation: Politician

Eduardo Rivera Gullas Sr. (October 13, 1930 – November 6, 2025), known as "Eddie" or "Eddiegul", was a Filipino politician from Cebu. The son of Vicente Gullas and Josefina "Pining" Rivera, he was elected to seven terms as a Member of the House of Representatives of the Philippines, representing the 1st District of Cebu from 1992 to 2001, 2004 to 2013, and from 2019 to 2022. He was at the time of his death a member of Nacionalista and the One Cebu party. Gullas had also served as the governor of Cebu during the administration of President Ferdinand Marcos, whom he was a close political associate of. During his tenure as governor, Cebu was struck by Typhoon Ike, which affected and devastated the province. Gullas also served as the president of the University of the Visayas. He had also held the offices of Deputy Speaker of the House of Representatives and the House Majority Leader. He served as mayor of Talisay, Cebu from 2016 to 2019. He was among the 70 congressmen who voted to deny the ABS-CBN franchise. Gullas died on November 6, 2025, at the age of 95.

== Early life and education ==
Eduardo was born in Cebu City on October 13, 1930. He was the eldest son and one of the three children of Vicente A. Gullas, a lawyer and educator from Cebu, and Josefina Rivera. His father was the founder of what is now the University of the Visayas (UV), (Note: University of the Visayas was founded as the Visayan Institute.) Cebu's oldest and Visayas' largest private university.

He completed his primary and secondary education in Cebu City. He earned the Bachelor of Laws at UV in 1956; and his pre-law, Bachelor of Arts with majors in English and Philosophy, graduating cum laude, at the University of Santo Tomas (UST) in 1951. On the other hand, he was conferred the Doctor of Public Administration, Honoris Causa, by the Cebu Normal University.

He passed the 1957 Bar Examination.

== Personal life ==
He was married to Norma Selma. They had two sons: Eduardo Jr. and Gerald Anthony.

=== Family's involvement in politics ===
The Gullas family has been involved in politics and remains influential due to their contributions to education, among others, and voter support in southern Cebu province, particularly in the city of Talisay. Notably, the 1st district of Cebu has been in their control.

While Eddie's father failed in his attempt to participate, some of his relatives also succeeded otherwise:

- Atty. Paulino (his uncle) was the representative of the old 2nd district of Cebu (1925–1928) and the "Commissioner of the Visayas" in the Japanese-sponsored government.
- Jose (his brother) was the representative of the 1st district (2001–2004).
- Samsam (his grandson) entered politics in 2013, and has been city mayor since 2019. His wife, Rhea, has been the district representative since 2022. Both were re-elected unopposed in 2025.
- Digul (Eduardo III; his grandson, Samsam's younger brother) has been a councilor of Talisay for more than a decade. He was likewise re-elected in 2025.

== Academic career ==
After graduation at UST, Gullas returned to Cebu and, later with his youngest brother Jose, worked in the family-run UV. He was a janitor and a teller in the accounting department.

Later, he became the university president; and from 1960s to 1980s, the school expanded with the installation of new facilities.

Gullas was also the executive vice president and dean of Gullas Law School. In 2004, he established the Talisay City College.

== Political career ==
=== Early years (1969–1986) ===
==== First years in Congress ====
Gullas started his political career in the Congress in 1969. Being a member of the ruling Nacionalista Party (NP) of president Ferdinand Marcos, he was elected representative of the old 3rd district of Cebu, (Note: Until 1972, the (old) 3rd district of Cebu was composed of Carcar, Minglanilla, Naga, San Fernando, and Talisay. Later, the district was converted as these local units were included to the (new) 1st district, with the inclusion of Sibonga.) defeating two incumbent representatives.—Atty. Antonio Cuenco of the old 5th district and from Liberal Party, with only a margin of 16 votes; and re-electionist Ernesto Bascon, a UV alumnus. That controversial result became the subject of an electoral protest filed by Cuenco before the Supreme Court which, however, was lost in a decision more than a month later.

His term was cut short in 1972 by the declaration of martial law as the president abolished Congress.

==== After the martial law declaration ====
On January 1, 1974, with the organization of the newly-created Professional Regulation Commission, Gullas was appointed by president Marcos as one of the associate commissioners.

==== As provincial governor ====
In 1976, Gullas, a close associate of First Lady Imelda Marcos, was appointed governor of Cebu by President Marcos who had been reorganizing the provincial government; replacing Osmundo Rama. The Duranos, yet another Marcos ally, opposed the appointment, leading to the rivalry which became public by 1978.

The rivalry was evident in the 1978 elections for the Interim Batasang Pambansa (National Assembly), as Gullas and the Duranos led two of the factions of the Kilusang Bagong Lipunan (KBL), Marcos' ruling party since the imposition of martial law. However, KBL lost all 13 seats for Central Visayas to oppositionist Pusyon Bisaya.

In the 1980 local elections, Gullas retained the governorship. In July 1981, Gullas was appointed by the president into the 14-member Executive Committee, a body of advisors that acted as the collective deputy presidency and which would serve in a caretaker capacity, representing the provincial governments.

In 1986, Gullas supported Marcos in the presidential election where the latter lost in the entire Cebu City and Cebu province. His governorship ended sometime after the EDSA revolt when he was replaced by Rama—the same man whom he had replaced—as Officer in Charge on President Corazon Aquino's orders.

Thereafter, He returned to resume his duties at UV. He declined calls to run for governor in the first post-EDSA local election to focus, albeit shortly, in his private life and in managing their university.

=== 1992–2013: Return to politics ===
==== Second time in Congress (1992–2001) ====
Gullas returned to politics in 1992. This time under Nationalist People's Coalition (NPC), he reclaimed the congressional seat in the elections, defeating incumbent representative of Cebu's 1st district, Atty. Antonio Bacaltos of Talisay, by landslide. He assumed the post until 2001.

Being one of NPC members, he became part of the so-called "Rainbow Coalition". He was a Promdi member at the time he won his third term in 1998.

During the presidency of Joseph Estrada, Gullas became the House deputy speaker for the Visayas until January 2000 when he was selected as the majority leader, succeeding Mar Roxas. In the height of controversies involving the president particularly the jueteng payola, he resigned from the position by November 5, the day he defected from the ruling coalition Lapian ng Masang Pilipino. The following day, he was one of the Cebuano representatives who relaunched the dormant regional political party Alayon, (Note: Alayon is a Cebuano term for "working mutually in groups.") which he established in 1986. He later served as the party's secretary general.

Meanwhile, he was later accused of misusing government-owned equipment for the construction of his hilltop mansion in Minglanilla, which he denied.

==== As city mayor (2001–2004) ====
Gullas was known for converting the municipality of Talisay into a city. Constitutionally barred to seek another congressional term, he became the first elected city mayor in 2001 as the conversion had been ratified in a plebiscite on December 30, 2000.

==== Return to Congress (2004–2013) ====
Gullas regained the seat for representative of the same district in 2004 and served until 2013. He had been a member again of NP by mid-2000s; and was once a member of Kampi, part of the majority coalition.

In 2005, he was among those more than a hundred representatives who openly supported president Gloria Arroyo amid an opposition-led move to impeach the president for electoral fraud.

He led the Cebuano legislators who opposed the proposed division of Cebu known as Sugbuak, which was later eventually shelved.

===== "Gullas Bills" =====
In the House of Representatives, Gullas, in some occasions, filed bills that sought to reinstate and institutionalize the use of English language as the sole medium of instruction (MOI) in all public schools countrywide; (Note: Multiple citations used (English-only MOI):) and to mandate its use in government and admission examinations to public learning institutions. (Note: Multiple citations used (English in examinations):) These were in an attempt to strengthen proficiency of Filipinos in English, in line with orders from President Arroyo. Also, these were among the attempts to revise the Bilingual Education Program by the Department of Education (DepEd), introduced in 1974. He said that the policy had weakened English as subjects supposed to be taught in that language were actually done in Taglish, or a blend of English and the local dialect. Such efforts failed to become a law on procedural grounds, despite having widespread support in the chamber and from DepEd.

Gullas first filed the bill during the 13th Congress—in 2006—causing mixed reactions among the Congress. Despite the approval on the English bill by the House in September, Senators failed to act on the bill because they were preoccupied with the 2007 midterm elections.

He refiled the bill at the start of the 14th Congress. He principally authored House Bill (HB) No. 305 (also called the English Bill and the Gullas Bill), which was later made a priority measure. Among the 240 House members, at least 205 signed as co-authors of the bill which was endorsed by a total of 207.

Later, HB No. 5619 was filed, with Gullas as the principal author and one of the six lead sponsors. It was a substitute measure, consolidating those individually authored by Gullas, Raul del Mar of Cebu City, and Luis Villafuerte of Camarines Sur (hence, the Gullas, Villafuerte and del Mar bill); and was one of two bills filed in the House on the issue of MOI. This time, coincided with the move towards globalization, it aimed to reinforce the use of English in the country for the Filipinos to be competitive on the labor market. The bill also sought to encourage the use of English in interaction in schools. (Note: Multiple citations used (English in interactions in schools):) Around 202 of 238 House members co-authored the bill. Despite the endorsement of the measure for approval, by January 2010, the bill was up for report on committee level and was reportedly not a priority.

=== Later years (2013–2022) ===
==== 2013 elections ====
In 2013, Gullas, running for the city mayorship of Talisay under the NP–Alayon, lost in an upset to businessman-inventor Johnny (JVR) delos Reyes by a margin of 736 votes; thus his only electoral defeat in his political career. His candidacy had been marred by massive opposition from those affected, both by the 2011 closure of the old public market in Tabunok, which he reopened in the final days of the campaign, as well as by the city government's decision to relocate the market to another barangay. He later conceded defeat.

==== 2016 victory; prior to retirement ====
In 2016, the Gullas family regained the city as Eddiegul defeated re-electionist delos Reyes by a margin of more than 35 thousand votes. He served for the second time as city mayor until 2019.

Gullas was among the 70 representatives who voted for the denial of a new franchise for ABS-CBN.

He retired from politics in 2022.

== Other careers ==
Gullas, along with Cuenco and Bascon, was a member of the Cebu's Junior Jaycees, a non-profit organization for the youth.

Gullas officially became a lawyer on March 8, 1957.

In 1981, he founded the Cebu Popular Music Festival, an annual song contest.

== Death ==
Gullas died on November 6, 2025, at the age of 95 due to septic shock, pneumonia, and acute respiratory failure.

== Notes ==
House of Representatives of the Philippines
Preceded by Antonio Bacaltos	Member of the Philippine House of Representatives from Cebu's 1st district 1992–2001; 2004–2013	Succeeded by Jose R. Gullas
Preceded by Jose R. Gullas	Member of the Philippine House of Representatives from Cebu's 1st district 1992–2001; 2004–2013	Succeeded by Gerald Anthony Gullas Jr.
Political offices
Preceded by Osmundo Rama	Governor of Cebu; 1976–1986	Succeeded by Osmundo Rama
Preceded by Johnny V. de los Reyes	Mayor of Talisay, Cebu; 2016–2019; 2001–2004	Succeeded by Gerald Anthony Gullas Jr.
Preceded by Socrates Fernandez	Mayor of Talisay, Cebu; 2016–2019; 2001–2004	Succeeded by Socrates Fernandez
