= Leo Lastimosa =

Filipino journalist

- Born: Leo Andanar Lastimosa; September 26, 1964 (age 62)
- Education: University of San Jose-Recoletos (Bachelor of Arts Political Science)
- Occupations: Journalist; Radio broadcaster; Newscaster; Columnist
- Organizations: ABS-CBN; The Freeman; DYAB; SIBYA TV
- Television: TV Patrol Central Visayas
- Spouse: Iris Jakosalem

YouTube information
- Channel: Leo Lastimosa
- Years active: July 29, 2022–present
- Genre: News Commentary
- Subscribers: 45,000
- Views: 26,810,580
- Last updated: 28 September 2026

Leo Andanar Lastimosa (born September 26, 1964) is a Filipino journalist. He was a former anchorman for ABS-CBN's regional television news program TV Patrol Central Visayas, former radio host of the current affairs program Arangkada on radio station DYAB, and columnist for The Freeman and Banat daily newspapers. Currently, he livestreams his news commentary in his YouTube channel.

== Early life ==
Lastimosa is the son of a farmer and a public school teacher. Growing up in poverty in Talisay, he had a dream of becoming a writer. During high school, he decided to submit an unsolicited article to the publisher of The Freeman, a local daily in Cebu. His submission was published the next day, an event that encouraged him to pursue a journalistic career.

He earned a degree in political science at the University of San Jose-Recoletos, through a scholarship from the Ramon Aboitiz Foundation Inc. (RAFI). Later, he enrolled at the University of San Carlos College of Law as a scholar (of Wilfredo “Baby” Camomot), but did not proceed to finish.

== Career ==
His professional journalism career began in 1985 at DYLA-AM. He later moved to another radio station, DYRF. During the height of the first EDSA revolution, he played a role in the newsroom operations at the radio station. In 1995, he became a news director in the newly-launched radio station, DYAB, and started hosting the regular television program, Banat Visayas, Sulong Mindanao. He claimed he had received death threats in the course of his journalistic career.

In 2003, he became an anchor for TV Patrol Central Visayas, which aired on ABS-CBN 3 Cebu. He also began writing a column called Arangkada in The Freeman, a local daily newspaper, using the Cebuano language.

=== Decriminalizing libel ===
G.R. No. 233577
- Court: Supreme Court of the Philippines en banc
- Decided: December 5, 2022
- G.R. number: 233577
- Citation: Leo A. Lastimosa Vs. People of the Philippines

Ruling
- Ponente: Alfredo Benjamin Caguioa
- ACQUITED
- Concurrence: Henri Jean Paul Inting, Samuel Gaerlan, Japar Dimaampao, Maria Filomena Singh

Keywords
- Freedom of the press, Defamation

In 2007, then Cebu Governor Gwendolyn Garcia filed a libel case against Lastimosa. The suit alleged that Garcia was the subject of his column entitled Doling Kawatan (Doling the Thief) that was published on The Freeman last June 29, 2007. On August 27, 2010, Regional Trial Court Branch 14 Judge Raphael Yrastorza signed a warrant of arrest against Lastimosa, who then posted bail. Lastimosa denied that Garcia was the subject of the article. On August 30, 2013, the court found Lastimosa guilty, and fined him ₱6,000 and an additional ₱2,000,000 for moral damages. He lost his appeal as the Court of Appeals upheld the lower court's decision. Attorney Celso Espinosa, his counsel, filed a motion for reconsideration to reverse the ruling of the appellate court.

This libel case, as well as other similar high-level cases filed against journalists in the country, prompted renewed calls to decriminalize libel in defense of press freedom.

On December 5, 2022, Lastimosa was acquitted of all charges of libel against Garcia by the Supreme Court.

=== CIDG subpoena ===
On August 17, 2018, Lastimosa appeared in the regional office of Criminal Investigation and Detection Group (CIDG) - Central Visayas in response to a subpoena that directed him to provide a copy of his interview with Senator Antonio Trillanes on his radio show last September 8, 2017. The subpoena came after former Davao City vice mayor Paolo Duterte, son of President Rodrigo Duterte, requested the police to obtain a copy of the interview as evidence in court for a libel case he was filing against Trillanes who accused him for being involved in Php 6.2 billion shabu shipment in 2016. Lastimosa executed an affidavit stating that audio recordings were long deleted as radio stations were only mandated to keep the records for 10 days or 30 days when there is a court order. He also declined to authenticate a recording of the said interview presented by the CIDG.

=== Give Up Tomorrow ===
Lastimosa also appeared in the documentary Give Up Tomorrow alongside other journalists who were interviewed regarding the controversial conviction of Paco Laranaga, one of the suspects of the murder of the Chiong sisters in the 1990s.

=== Journalist in Online Media ===
After the shutdown of ABS-CBN, Lastimosa eventually became a news commentator in online media, independent of an established news outfit. He is among a number of journalists who are now becoming content creators. He livestreams everyday primarily in his YouTube channel. In the morning he goes live with Baruganan (Stand) and in the evening with Panahum sa Kilom-Kilom (Opinion at Dusk).

== Personal life ==
Aside from journalism, he also ventured into music. He penned the lyrics of Awit ni Dodong, the winning entry of the theme song contest for the Jose “Dodong” R. Gullas (JRG) Halad Museum. About a lover's hopes and fears for a beloved, the song was put into music by Emilio Villareal.

Lastimosa married to practitioner Iris Jakosalem.

== Awards ==
Lastimosa has won numerous awards and recognition for his work. Notably, the Talisay City Council passed a resolution congratulating him for his win at 2005 KBP Golden Dove Awards citing his "commendable competence, integrity and fairness in the field of newscasting and showed his dedication and deep love for his country and people by his humble service as a media man."

- Best TV Newscaster, The 14th Golden Dove Awards of the Kapisanan ng mga Brodkaster ng Pilipinas (KBP)
- Garbo Sa Sugbo, by the Cebu Provincial Government in the field of broadcast journalism and television
- Best TV News Program, TV Patrol Central Visayas, 16th Cebu Archdiocesan Mass Media Awards, 2013
- Outstanding Talisaynon, by the Talisay City Government in the field of media.
- Hall of Fame, Radio News Category, Cebu Archdiocesan Mass Media Awards (CAMMA)
- Hall of Fame, Radio Commentary Category, Cebu Archdiocesan Mass Media Awards (CAMMA)
- Finalist, Column Writing Category, Cebu Archdiocesan Mass Media Awards (CAMMA)
- Special Citation, Kasayurang Kinuykoyan, National Press Club (NPC), 1991
- Best Public Affairs Program (Arangkada), KBP Golden Dove Awards, 1998
- Best Public Affairs Program Host, KBP Golden Dove Awards, 2002
- Best Commentary Program (Kuwentas Klaras), KBP Golden Dove Awards, 2002
- Best TV News Program, Catholic Mass Media Awards (CMMA-Manila), 2005

== Filmography ==
=== Television ===
Year	Title	Role	Channel
1995-1996	Banat Visayas, Sulong Mindanao	Anchor	ABS-CBN Regional Network Group (RNG)
2003–2020	TV Patrol Central Visayas	Main News Anchor	ABS-CBN Channel 3 Cebu

== Radio ==
Year	Title	Role	Channel
Until 2020	Arangkada	Commentary Anchor	DYAB
Until 2020	DYAB Radyo Patrol Balita	News Anchor	DYAB
Until 2020	Kasayurang Kinuykoyan	Commentary Anchor	DYAB

== See also ==
- TV Patrol Central Visayas
- DYAB
- The Freeman
