= Philippine Startup Challenge =

Annual national startup pitching competition

- Genre: Startup pitching competition
- Purpose: Promote innovation, entrepreneurship, and ICT-driven student startups
- Frequency: Annually
- Country: Philippines
- Inaugurated: 2014
- Founder: Department of Information and Communications Technology
- Website: startup.gov.ph

The Philippine Startup Challenge is an annual national startup pitching competition in the Philippines organized by the Department of Information and Communications Technology (DICT) through its ICT Industry Development Bureau (IIDB). Launched in 2014, the competition serves as the DICT's flagship youth innovation program, aimed at encouraging Filipino students to develop technology-driven solutions addressing local and society challenges.
