= Samsam Gullas =

Filipino politician

The Honorable Samsam Gullas
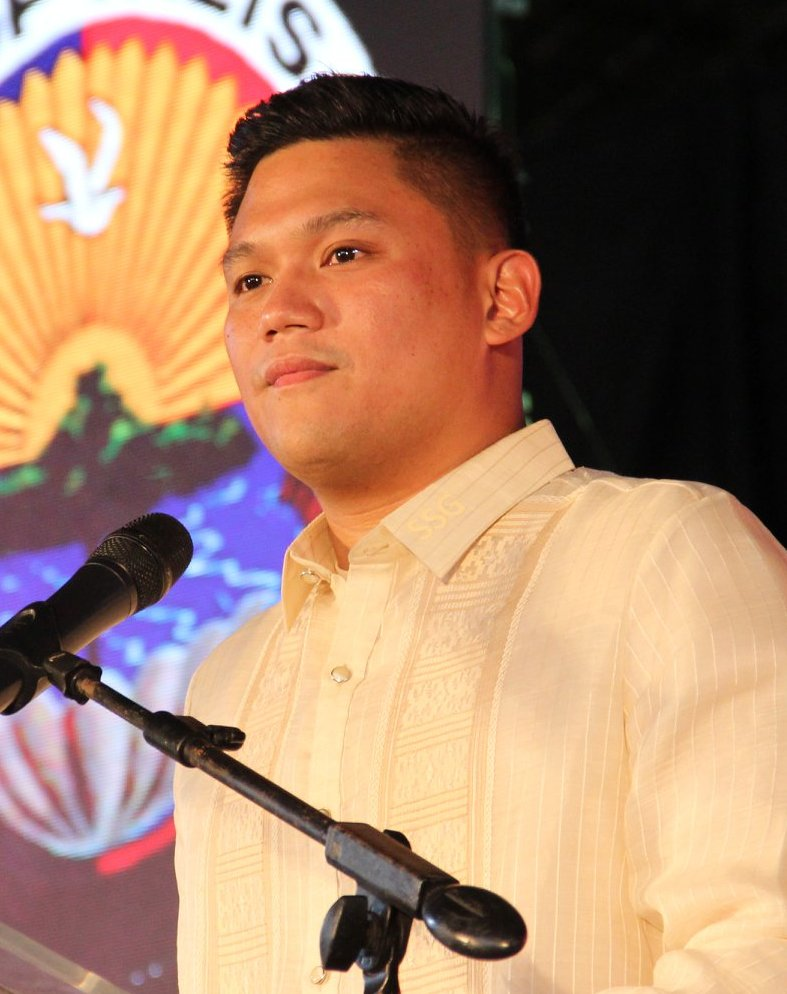
- Gullas in 2019

Mayor of Talisay, Cebu
- Incumbent
- Assumed office June 30, 2019
- Vice Mayor: Alan Bucao
- Preceded by: Eduardo R. Gullas

Member of the Philippine House of Representatives from Cebu's 1st district
- In office June 30, 2013 – June 30, 2019
- Preceded by: Eduardo R. Gullas
- Succeeded by: Eduardo R. Gullas

Personal details
- Born: Gerald Anthony Vargas Gullas Jr. December 1, 1984 (age 41) Quezon City, Philippines
- Party: Nacionalista (2012–present); Alayon (local party; 2012–present)
- Spouse: Rhea Mae Aquino
- Parents: Gerald Anthony Gullas, Sr. (father); Josephine Vargas (mother)
- Education: Centre for International Education (BS); Ateneo de Manila University (MBA)

Gerald Anthony "Samsam" Vargas Gullas Jr. (born December 1, 1984) is a Filipino politician serving as the mayor of Talisay, Cebu since 2019. He previously served as representative for Cebu's 1st congressional district from 2013 to 2019.

== Early life and education ==
Gullas is the eldest son of Gerald Anthony "Didi" Gullas and Josephine Vargas. He is also the grandson of former Talisay City mayor and incumbent Cebu 1st district representative Eduardo Gullas. He completed his tertiary education and graduated as summa cum laude in 2009 at Centre for International Education and earned a master's degree in business administration at the Ateneo Graduate School of Business in 2015.

== Early career ==
Gullas started working as assistant vice president for Finance and Administration of the University of the Visayas and also served as manager UV Green Lancers, the school's basketball team.

== Political career ==
=== House of Representatives (2013–2019) ===
Running unopposed as representative of Cebu' 1st district in the 2013 local elections, Gullas won with 153,514 votes and succeeded his grandfather, Eduardo Gullas who reclaimed his old post as mayor of Talisay City. At the age of 28, he became the youngest member of the 16th Congress of the Philippines. In his re-election bid in 2016, he ran against then San Fernando mayor Antonio "Abe" Canoy and overwhelmingly defeated the latter by garnering 186,091 votes to Canoy's 83,023 votes.

=== Mayor of Talisay City (2019–present) ===
Despite being eligible for a third and last term, Gullas opted to run as mayor of Talisay City which in turn allowed his grandfather Eduardo to run again as representative of Cebu's 1st district in the 2019 local elections. The younger Gullas won in the said election.

In his 2019 State of the City Address, Gullas indicated that tourism was his top priority for the city as it aims to promote food tourism with its lechon delicacy and the historic landing site of American forces located at Barangay Poblacion. He also proposed for the construction of a boardwalk and a site to host lechon stalls. He was confronted by the city's illegal drug problem which was mentioned by President Rodrigo Duterte for the second time during his speech on January 19, 2020, for the Sinulog Festival in Cebu. Duterte previously called out the city police officials on the said problem in a speech last February 24, 2019.

On March 29, 2020, Gullas confirmed the city's first COVID-19 case amidst the COVID-19 pandemic in the Philippines.

In August 2024, Talisay Mayor Gullas handed over to Talisay City Science High School the P3 million Interactive Laboratory with experiment apparatus, “Learnytic Multimedia Kit”, robotics facility and an 85-inch computer monitor.

== Personal life ==
Gullas is married to Rhea Mae Aquino and together have two daughters, namely Princess and Samantha Niña.

House of Representatives of the Philippines
Preceded by Eduardo R. Gullas	Member of the Philippine House of Representatives from Cebu's 1st district 2013–2019	Succeeded by Eduardo R. Gullas
Political offices
Preceded by Eudardo R. Gullas	Mayor of Talisay, Cebu; 2019–present	Incumbent
