= Jose Gullas =

Filipino Visayan politician (1934–2021)

The Honorable Jose Gullas
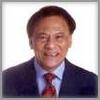
- Official portrait, 2001

Member of the Philippine House of Representatives from Cebu's 1st District
- In office June 30, 2001 – June 30, 2004
- Preceded by: Eduardo R. Gullas
- Succeeded by: Eduardo R. Gullas

Personal details
- Born: Jose Rivera Gullas; February 1, 1934
- Died: February 25, 2021 (aged 87) Cebu City, Philippines
- Resting place: Daughters of Saint Teresa compound, Valladolid, Carcar, Cebu, Philippines
- Party: NPC (2001–2004); Alayon (local party; 2001–2004)
- Parent(s): Vicente Gullas (father); Josefina Rivera-Gullas (mother)
- Education: University of the Visayas
- Occupation: Politician

Jose "Dodong" Rivera Gullas (February 1, 1934 – February 25, 2021) was a Filipino Visayan politician from Cebu, Philippines. The son of Vicente Gullas and Pining Rivera, he has been elected to one term as a Member of the House of Representatives of the Philippines, representing the 1st District of Cebu from 2001 to 2004. He died on February 25, 2021, at 87 from pancreatic cancer and was buried on March 3, 2021, at the Daughters of Saint Teresa compound in Valladolid, Carcar.

== Personal life ==
Preceded by Eduardo R. Gullas	Representative, 1st District of Cebu; 2001–2004	Succeeded by Eduardo R. Gullas
