= Vicente Gullas =

Filipino writer and educator

- Born: January 12, 1888; Cebu City, Cebu, Captaincy General of the Philippines
- Died: December 22, 1970 (aged 82); Cebu, Philippines
- Monuments: Vicente Gullas Memorial Hospital; Vicente Gullas Street, Cebu City
- Education: Cebu High School; Manila High School; University of the Philippines
- Occupations: Lawyer; Educator; Writer
- Known for: Founder of the Visayan Institute; English-Cebuano-Spanish Dictionary; Author of Lapu-lapu: Ang Nagbuntog Kang Magellan
- Spouse: Josefina Rivera Gullas
- Children: Eduardo Gullas; Jose Gullas; Gliceria Gullas
- Relatives: Paulino Gullas (brother)

Vicente Arandia Gullas (January 12, 1888 – December 22, 1970) was a Filipino writer, lawyer, and educator from Cebu, Philippines. Founder of the Visayan Institute, he introduced innovation in educational system through the establishment of working student and study-now-pay-later schemes and of satellite schools to allow students from locations outside Cebu City. In 2019, he was hailed as one of the top 100 Cebuano personalities.

As a writer, he published three editions of the English-Cebuano-Spanish dictionary, wrote poems that were printed in the Cebuano periodical, Ang Suga, and published the 1938 historical fiction, Lapu-lapu: Ang Nagbuntog Kang Magellan (Lapu-lapu: The Conqueror of Magellan), which was republished in 2007.

== Early life and education ==
Vicente Gullas was born to Herminigildo Gullas and Necifora Arandia in Cebu City on January 12, 1888. His brother, Paulino Gullas, was the first Cebuano to top the bar exams who perished during World War II.

His parents were of modest means, and he worked to pay for his high school studies such as getting employed as a clerk and checker on shipping vessels operating in Cebu City. He attended San Nicolas Elementary School, Seminario de San Carlos, Cebu High School, and Manila High School.

As a working student, he excelled in school and became known as a skilled public speaker, becoming president of Cebu Debating Club three times and of Manila's Rizal Debating Club. Upon moving in Manila, he became a reporter while continuing his education and attended Manila High School in 1909 where he was schoolmates with Jose Laurel, Manuel Roxas, and Elpidio Quirino.

He acquired his law degree at the University of the Philippines. In his time, students can take the bar examination without completing the four-year curriculum of Bachelor of Laws. He took and passed the exams when he was a junior student and became a lawyer.

== Personal life ==
He married Josefina Rivera. The couple bore three children namely former Cebu governor Eduardo Gullas (b.1930), former Congressman of Cebu 1st district Jose Gullas (1934–2021), and Gliceria.

== Career ==
=== Educator ===
While he started practicing law as a profession, he shifted focus on education. He founded and became the president of Visayan Institute in 1919. On October 1, 1921, he transformed the management of the school from sole proprietorship to a non-stock corporation and invited friends as its incorporators such as Pantaleon E. Del Rosario, Manuel C. Briones, Eugenio S. del Rosario, and his brother Paulino.

Renamed as the University of the Visayas in 1948, it was the first university in Cebu and the biggest school in Central Visayas in his time. With the advocacy of providing education to students from average-income to low-income families, it introduced innovations in the educational system such as the availability of evening classes for high school and college students, working student programs, study-now-pay-later scheme, and establishment of satellite schools in locations outside of Cebu City.

=== Writer ===
He was a writer in English and Cebuano and authored books on law, education, and civics. His poems were published in Vicente Sotto's Ang Suga. Moreover, he published a Cebuano-English-Spanish dictionary that was printed for three editions from 1935 to 1953. In 1938, he published the novel of historical fiction, Lapu-lapu: Ang Nagbuntog Kang Magellan (Lapu-lapu: The Conqueror of Magellan). The book was relaunched on March 12, 2007, with introduction and annotation by Resil Mojares and English translation by Erlinda K. Alburo. Critic Alfred A. Yuson commented that the novel was a fictional biography of Lapu-lapu that "merged moralistic teachings with a near-mythic tale of Lapu-lapu's growth as a young boy of athletic prowess and dauntless courage."

== Later years ==
He died on December 22, 1970.

== Historical commemoration ==
- The Vicente Gullas Street located in Cebu City as named in his honor. Previously known as Manalili Street, it starts from Mariano Jesus Cuenco (M.J. Cuenco) Avenue and ends at Osmeña Boulevard. The renaming was made on August 5, 1971, months after his death.
- He was included in the Top 100 Cebuano Personalities according to The Freeman.

== Publications ==
- English-Visayan-Spanish Dictionary (1953) and (1937) editions
- Philippine Government: Development, Organization, Functions and Comparative Organic Studies
- Lapu-lapu: Ang Nagbuntog Kang Magellan (Lapu-lapu: The Conqueror of Magellan) (2007)
