= University of the Visayas =

Private university in Cebu City, Philippines

- Pamantasan sa Bisayas
- Former name: Visayan Institute (1919–1948)
- Motto: Amor, Servitium, Humanitas (Latin)
- Motto in English: Love, Service to Humanity
- Type: Private, Research university, Coeducational, Basic and Higher education institution
- Established: 1919
- Founder: Vicente A. Gullas
- Academic affiliations: PACUCOA
- President: Dr. Condrado E. Iñigo, Jr.
- Emeritus: Eduardo R. Gullas, Sr.
- Students: 35,000 (Main campus); 20,000 (Satellite campuses)
- Location: Corner Colon and D. Jakosalem Streets, Cebu City, 6000 Cebu, Philippines; 10°17′54″N 123°54′04″E
- Campus: Main campus: Downtown Cebu City Satellite campuses: Pob. Pardo, Cebu City Banilad, Mandaue City Toledo City Danao City Dalaguete, Cebu Minglanilla, Cebu Compostela, Cebu
- Alma Mater Song: Green and White March
- Colors: Green and White
- Sporting affiliations: CESAFI
- Mascot: Green Lancers
- Website: www.uv.edu.ph
- Location in the Visayas Location in the Philippines

The University of the Visayas (UV) is a private institution located in Cebu City, Philippines. It is the first school in the province of Cebu to attain university status.

== History ==
Vicente Gullas (1898–1970) founded the University of the Visayas in 1919 aiming to educate young people from average-income families. It was initially called the Visayan Institute, and occupied two rooms rented at the City Intermediate School. The number of students had increased from 37 in 1919 to 87 in 1920, and kept growing, but Gullas could not find a permanent building for the institute and kept moving over various locations in Cebu, borrowing auxiliary facilities from other schools nearby, such as physical education grounds of the Cebu Normal School and the public library near Fuente Osmeña. Finally, in 1946 the institute moved to its present site at Colon Street, and in 1948 received the university status.

In the 1980s–90s, the university added new master's degrees, in education, engineering, maritime studies, criminology and nursing. In 1994, four of the university programs were recognised by the Philippine Association of Colleges and Universities Commission on Accreditation. Earlier in 1994 the Gullas Medical Center and the College of Medicine were opened in Banilad.

== Campuses and location ==
The university has seven campuses:

- Main Campus along Colon Street, Cebu City
- Pardo Campus along E. Sabellano St., Brgy. Poblacion Pardo, Cebu City
- Banilad Campus/UV Gullas College of Medicine along Gov. Cuenco Ave., Brgy. Banilad, Mandaue City
- Minglanilla Campus along N. Bacalso Ave.(Cebu South Road), Brgy. Pob Ward I, Minglanilla, Cebu
- Compostela Campus along P. Cabatingan St., Brgy. Poblacion, Compostela, Cebu
- Dalaguete Campus along Pedro Calungsod St., Brgy. Poblacion, Dalaguete, Cebu
- Toledo Campus along S. Osmeña St., Brgy. Poblacion, Toledo City, Cebu
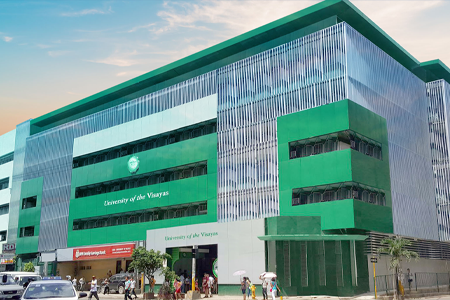
UV Main Campus

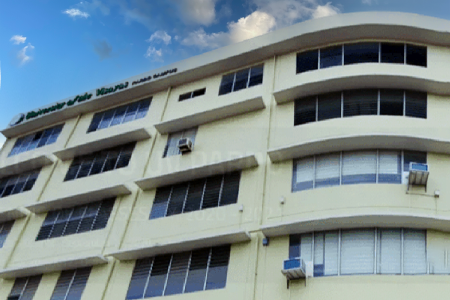
UV Pardo

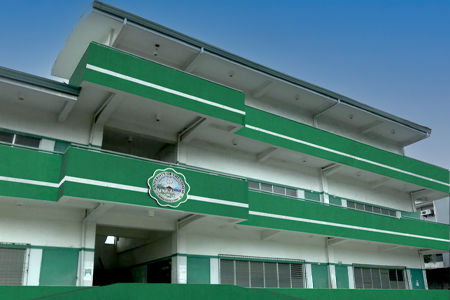
UV Minglanilla

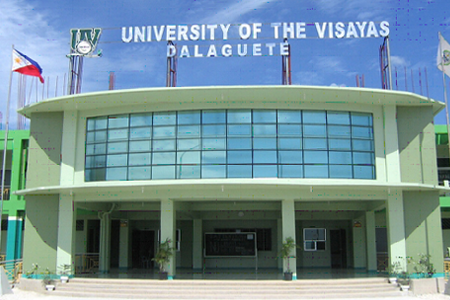
UV Dalaguete

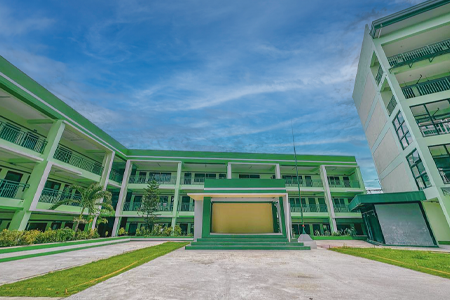
UV Toledo

The College of Dentistry and Nursing is situated on a separate campus in Banilad, Mandaue City, alongside the Vicente Gullas Memorial Hospital and the Gullas College of Medicine. Previously, the Gullas College of Medicine (formerly known as Mandaue Academy) operated from a campus in downtown Cambaro, Mandaue City. As of 2025, the UV Gullas College of Medicine has been relocated to the Banilad campus; little to no known released information about the campus' closure. The former Cambaro site has since been demolished, to make way for a new Jollibee branch.

== Administration ==
- President: Dr. Conrado E. Iñigo, Jr.
- Vice President for Academic Affairs: Dr. Anna Lou C. Cabuenas
- Vice President for Finance & QMS: Dr. Rosemarie Cruz- Español
- Vice President for Administration: Mr. Elmer S. Ocaba

== Notable alumni ==
- Eduardo Gullas, politician
- Elmer Cabahug (retired PBA player)
- Arnulfo "Arnie" Tuadles✝ (retired PBA player)
- Joaquin Rojas, MICAA and PBA basketball player
- Greg Slaughter, PBA basketball player
- Edgardo Labella, mayor of Cebu City
- Nerissa Soon-Ruiz, councilor of Mandaue City, former Sixth District representative
- Golden Cañedo, UV-Minglanilla, The Clash S1 Grand Champion
- Vicente Duterte, politician and father of President Rodrigo Duterte

== Gallery ==
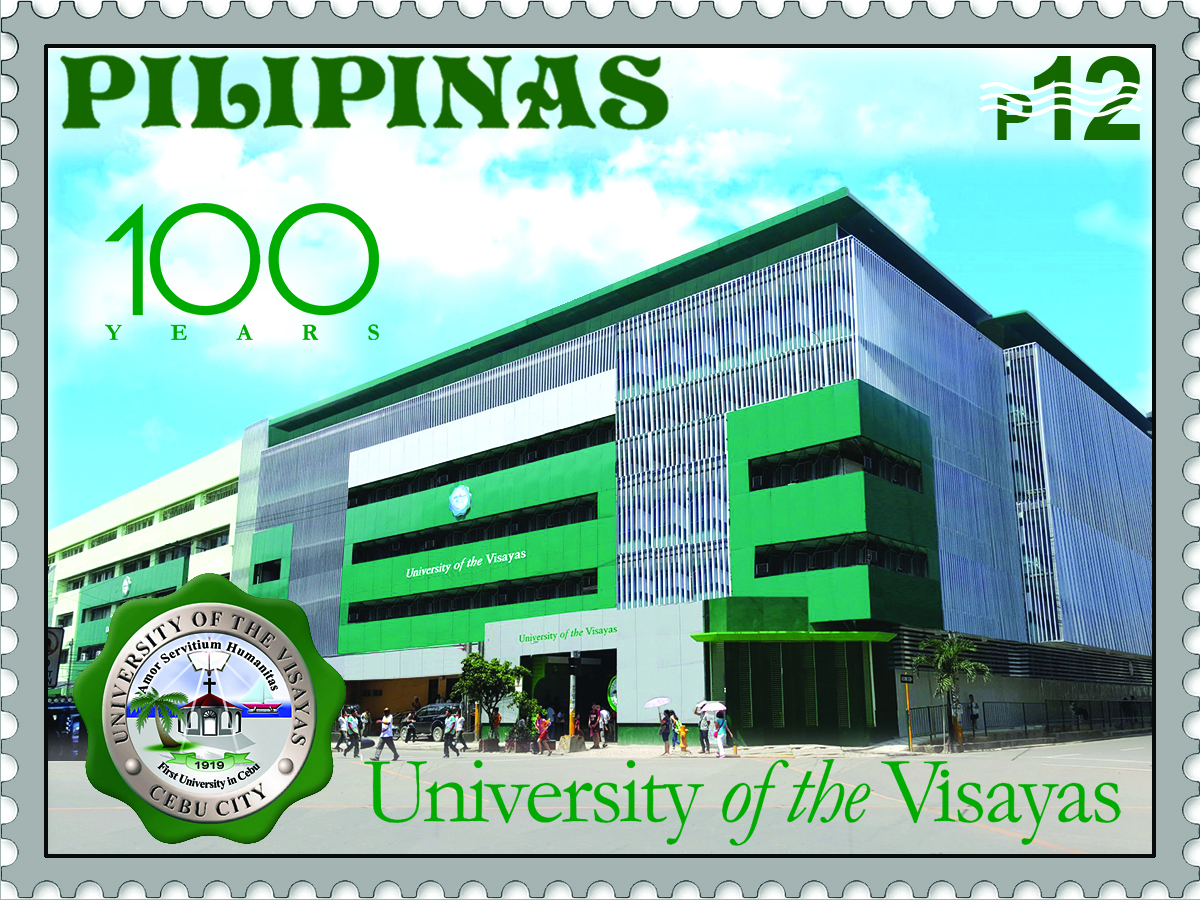
A 2019 stamp dedicated to the 100th anniversary of the University of the Visayas

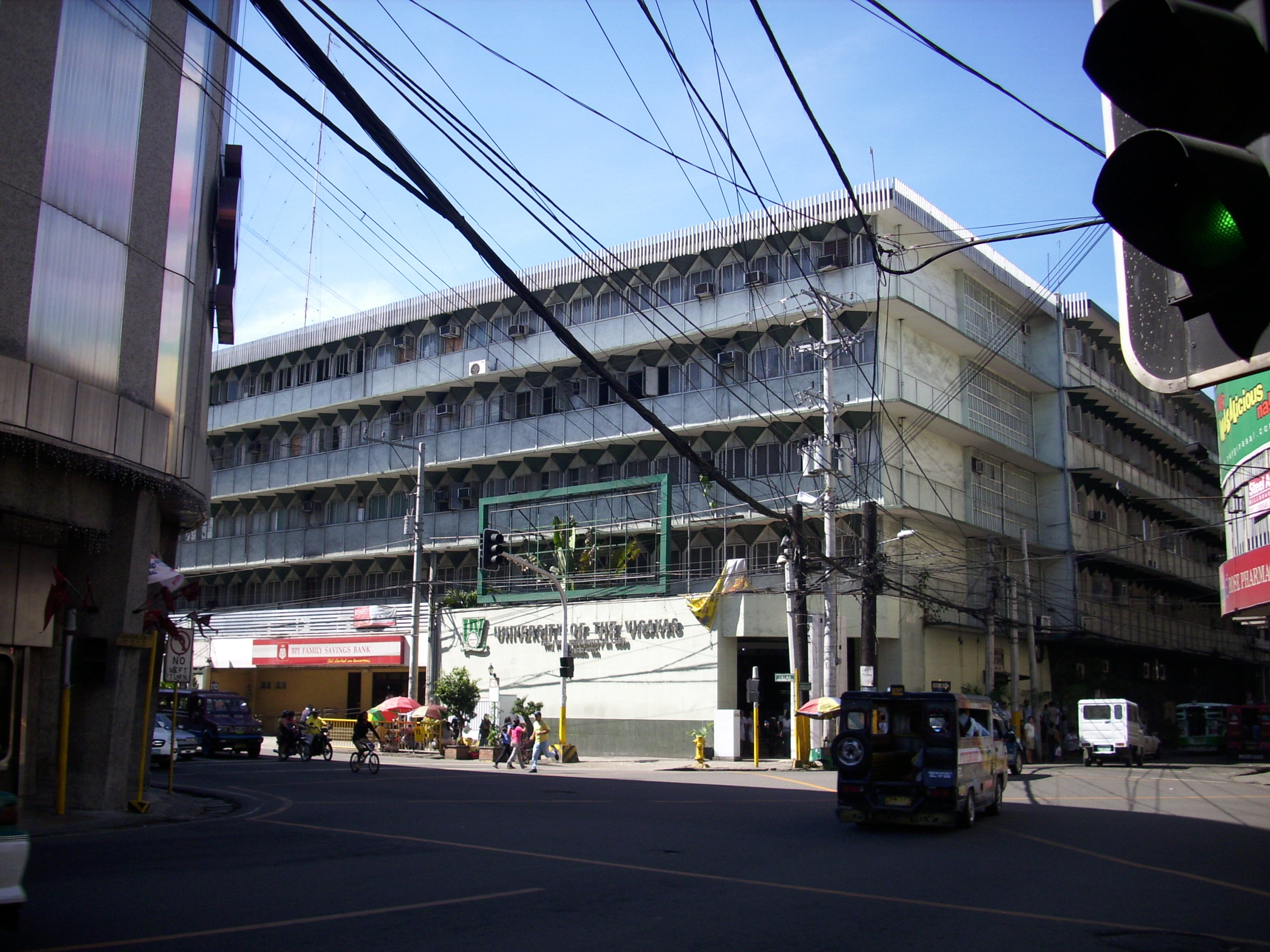
UV Main Campus in Cebu City, Philippines

== See also ==
- Medical education in the Philippines
