= 2019 Cebu local elections =

Election in Cebu, Philippines in 2019

2019 Cebu gubernatorial election
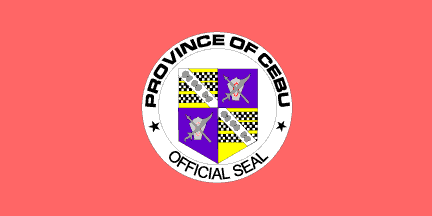
- May 13, 2019
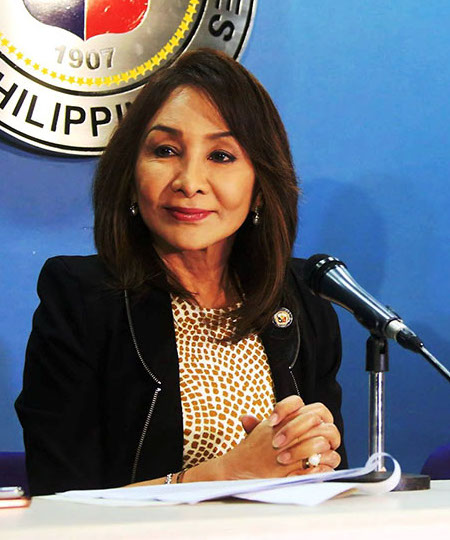

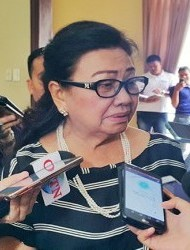
Nominee	Gwendolyn Garcia	Agnes Magpale
Party	PDP–Laban	NPC
Running mate	Daphne Salimbangon	Hilario Davide III
Popular vote	887,290	593,725
Percentage	58.51	39.47
- A map showing the results of the Cebu gubernatorial election by barangay
Governor before election
Hilario Davide III
Liberal
Elected Governor
Gwendolyn Garcia
PDP–Laban
- Vice gubernatorial election
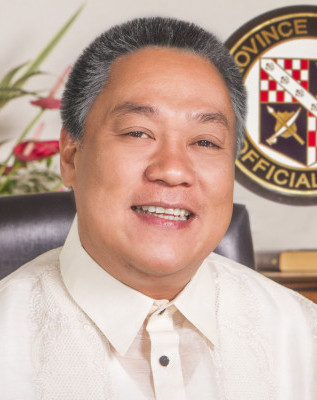

Candidate	Hilario Davide III	Daphne Salimbangon
Party	Liberal	PDP–Laban
Popular vote	781,312	618,828
Percentage	55.80	44.19
- A map showing the results of the Cebu vice gubernatorial election by barangay
Vice Governor before election
Agnes Magpale
NPC
Elected Vice Governor
Hilario Davide III
Liberal

Local elections were held in the province of Cebu on May 13, 2019, as part of the 2019 Philippine general election. Voters selected from among candidates for all local positions: a town mayor, vice mayor and town councilors, as well as members of the Sangguniang Panlalawigan, the vice governor, governor and representatives for the seven districts of Cebu (including two districts of Cebu City and the lone district of Lapu-Lapu City).

== Gubernatorial and Vice Gubernatorial race ==
=== Governor ===
Vice Governor Agnes Magpale ran for the first time as governor and was defeated by her opponent, former Governor Gwendolyn Garcia, who was also serving as representative of Cebu's third legislative district.

Cebu Gubernatorial election
Party	Candidate	Votes	%
PDP–Laban	Gwendolyn Garcia	887,290	58.51
NPC	Agnes Magpale	598,567	39.47
Independent	Roliveth Cortes	30,499	2.01
Total votes		1,516,356	100.00
Margin of victory		288,723	19.04
PDP–Laban gain from Liberal			

=== Vice Governor ===
Magpale's running mate was Governor Hilario Davide III while Garcia's running mate was businesswoman Daphne Salimbangon.

Cebu Vice gubernatorial election
Party	Candidate	Votes	%
Liberal	Hilario Davide III	781,312	55.80
PDP–Laban	Daphne Salimbangon	618,828	44.19
Total votes		1,400,140	100.00
Margin of victory		162,484	11.61
Liberal hold			

== Congressional race ==
=== 1st District ===
2019 Philippine House of Representatives election in Cebu's 1st District
Party	Candidate	Votes	%
Nacionalista	Eduardo Gullas	236,944	81.32
Independent	Ron Del Mar	48,131	16.51
Independent	Solomon Paypa	6,291	2.15
Total votes		291,366	100.00

=== 2nd District ===
Wilfredo Caminero is the incumbent.

2019 Philippine House of Representatives election in Cebu's 2nd District
Party	Candidate	Votes	%
NUP	Wilfredo Caminero	66,166	56.45
PDP–Laban	Ronald Allan Cesante	48,918	41.73
UNA	Cora Lou Kintanar	2,125	1.81
Total votes		117,209	100.00

=== 3rd District ===
2019 Philippine House of Representatives election in Cebu's 3rd District
Party	Candidate	Votes	%
PDP–Laban	Pablo John Garcia	128,878	51.68
Independent	John Henry Osmeña	77,068	30.90
NPC	Geraldine Yapha	43,416	17.41
Total votes		249,362	100.00

=== 4th District ===
2019 Philippine House of Representatives election in Cebu's 4th District
Party	Candidate	Votes	%
PDP–Laban	Janice Salimbangon	136,582	56.89
NPC	Celestino Martinez Jr.	103,493	43.10
Total votes		240,075	100.00

=== 5th District ===
2019 Philippine House of Representatives election in Cebu's 5th District
Party	Candidate	Votes	%
Lakas	Vincent Franco Frasco	152,435	56.61
NPC	Ramon Durano VI	116,826	43.38
Total votes		269,261	100.00

=== 6th District ===
2019 Philippine House of Representatives election in Cebu's 6th District
Party	Candidate	Votes	%
PDP–Laban	Emmarie Ouano-Dizon	177,791	78.93
NPC	Baldomero Estenzo	41,477	18.41
Independent	Walter Dy	5,974	2.65
Total votes		225,242	100.00

=== 7th District ===
2019 Philippine House of Representatives election in Cebu's 7th District
Party	Candidate	Votes	%
NPC	Peter John Calderon	71,123	66.30
PDP–Laban	Nelson Gamaliel Garcia	36,147	33.69
Total votes		107,270	100.00

=== Cebu City ===
==== 1st District ====
Raul del Mar ran for his third and final term and won. His opponent is actor and businessman Richard Yap. Yap is known for his character as Richard "Sir Chief" Lim in the drama series Be Careful with My Heart.

2019 Philippine House of Representatives election in the Cebu City's 1st District
Party	Candidate	Votes	%
Liberal	Raul del Mar	135,528	61.34
PDP–Laban	Richard Edison Yap	81,575	36.92
Independent	Florencio Villarin	2,244	1.02
Independent	Ricardo Dungog	1,609	0.73
Total votes		220,956	100.00

==== 2nd District ====
Rodrigo Abellanosa ran for his third and final term and won.

2019 Philippine House of Representatives election in the Cebu City's 2nd District
Party	Candidate	Votes	%
LDP	Rodrigo Abellanosa	163,752	61.22
PDP–Laban	Jocelyn Pesquera	103,717	38.78
Total votes		267,469	100.00

=== Lapu-Lapu City ===
2019 Philippine House of Representatives election in Lapu-Lapu City's Lone District
Party	Candidate	Votes	%
Lakas	Paz Radaza	76,645	52.38
PDP–Laban	Eugene Espedido	62,784	42.90
UNA	Karina Virginia Perpetua Cabahug	5,268	3.60
Independent	Pablo Doronio Jr.	1,623	1.10
Total votes		146,320	100.00

== Sangguniang Panlalawigan ==
Party	Popular vote		Seats	
Party	Total	%	Total	%
PDP–Laban	547,580	25.40%	4	24%
NPC	381,501	17.70%	3	18%
Nacionalista	332,700	15.43%	2	12%
BAKUD	211,767	9.82%	1	6%
Liberal	161,734	7.50%	1	6%
1-Cebu	110,680	5.13%	1	6%
NUP	104,899	4.87%	1	6%
Independent	304,745	14.14%	1	6%
Total	2,155,606	100%	14	82%

=== 1st District ===
Cebu 1st District Sangguniang Panlalawigan election
Party	Candidate	Votes	%
Nacionalista	Yolanda Daan	202,810	50.22
Nacionalista	Raul Bacaltos	129,890	32.16
Independent	Alexander Lara	71,132	17.61
Total votes		403,832	100.00

=== 2nd District ===
Cebu 2nd District Sangguniang Panlalawigan election
Party	Candidate	Votes	%
NPC	Jose Mari Salvador	70,149	36.77
PDP–Laban	Edsel Galeos	57,517	30.15
Liberal	Jonathan Villegas Sr.	36,139	18.94
PDP–Laban	Vip Semilla	26,958	14.13
Total votes		190,763	100.00

=== 3rd District ===
Cebu 3rd District Sangguniang Panlalawigan election
Party	Candidate	Votes	%
NPC	Victoria Corominas-Toribio	109,900	32.09
PDP–Laban	John Ismael Borgonia	101,342	29.59
NPC	Grecilda Sanchez	69,582	20.32
Independent	Leo Dolino	61,551	17.97
Total votes		342,375	100.00

=== 4th District ===
Cebu 4th District Sangguniang Panlalawigan election
Party	Candidate	Votes	%
NUP	Kerrie Keane Shimura	104,899	36.57
Liberal	Horacio Paul Franco	84,647	29.51
NPC	Miguel Angelo Pacheco	72,213	25.17
Independent	Samuel Moralde	25,055	8.73
Total votes		286,814	100.00

=== 5th District ===
Cebu 5th District Sangguniang Panlalawigan election
Party	Candidate	Votes	%
1-Cebu	Andrei Duterte	110,680	27.25
BAKUD	Miguel Magpale	107,806	26.55
BAKUD	Rosemarie Sybico	103,961	25.60
PDP–Laban	Michael Joseph Villamor	83,586	20.58
Total votes		406,033	100.00

=== 6th District ===
Cebu 6th District Sangguniang Panlalawigan election
Party	Candidate	Votes	%
PDP–Laban	Thadeo Jovito Ouano	144,066	38.94
PDP–Laban	Glenn Anthony Soco	134,111	36.25
NPC	Editha Cabahug	54,664	14.77
Independent	Paulus Mariae Cañete	37,107	10.03
Total votes		369,948	100.00

=== 7th District ===
Cebu 7th District Sangguniang Panlalawigan election
Party	Candidate	Votes	%
NPC	Jerome Librando	67,900	43.57
NPC	Christopher Baricuatro	46,993	30.15
Liberal	Erick Elmer Gica	40,948	26.27
Total votes		155,841	100.00

== City and municipal elections ==
=== 1st District, mayoral elections ===
==== Carcar ====
Carcar mayoral election
Party	Candidate	Votes	%
Nacionalista	Mercedita Apura	38,534	64.50
Independent	Roberto Aleonar Jr.	21,201	35.49
Total votes		59,735	100.00

==== Naga City ====
Naga City Mayoral election
Party	Candidate	Votes	%
Nacionalista	Valdemar Chiong	40,647	71.53
Independent	Delfin Señor	15,847	27.88
Independent	Epitacio Quimada	331	0.58
Total votes		56,825	100.00

==== Talisay City ====
Talisay City Mayoral election
Party	Candidate	Votes	%
Nacionalista	Gerald Anthony Gullas Jr.	88,105	88.88
Independent	Johnny De Los Reyes	11,016	11.11
Total votes		99,121	100.00

==== Minglanilla ====
Minglanilla Mayoral election
Party	Candidate	Votes	%
Nacionalista	Elanito Peña	27,196	56.66
NPC	Jesus Velez	20,795	43.33
Total votes		47,991	100.00

==== San Fernando ====
San Fernando Mayoral election
Party	Candidate	Votes	%
Nacionalista	Lakambini Reluya	22,294	58.88
Independent	Ruben Feliciano	15,567	41.11
Total votes		37,861	100.00

==== Sibonga ====
Sibonga Mayoral election
Party	Candidate	Votes	%
Nacionalista	Lionel Bacaltos	20,138	84.33
Independent	Tito Satera	3,403	14.25
Independent	Edgardo Anuada	219	0.91
Independent	Eutiquio Vilocura Jr.	119	0.49
Total votes		23,879	100.00

=== 2nd District, mayoral elections ===
==== Alcoy ====
Alcoy Mayoral election
Party	Candidate	Votes	%
NPC	Michael Angelo Sestoso	8,900	94.21
Independent	Jacinto Antig	546	5.78
Total votes		9,446	100.00

==== Argao ====
Argao Mayoral election
Party	Candidate	Votes	%
PDP–Laban	Allan Sesaldo	21,653	56.50
NPC	Stanley Caminero	16,449	42.92
Independent	Gina Kneller	217	0.56
Total votes		38,319	100.00

==== Boljoon ====
Boljoon Mayoral election
Party	Candidate	Votes	%
NPC	Merlou Derama	6,521	86.26
Independent	Jose Emmanuel Derama	1,038	13.73
Total votes		7,559	100.00

==== Dalaguete ====
Dalaguete Mayoral election
Party	Candidate	Votes	%
PDP–Laban	Jeffey Belciña	16,872	57.44
NPC	Francis Sydney Belciña	12,497	42.55
Total votes		29,369	100.00

==== Oslob ====
Oslob Mayoral election
Party	Candidate	Votes	%
NPC	Jose Tumulak Jr.	7,653	50.38
PDP–Laban	Ronald Guaren	7,536	49.61
Total votes		15,189	100.00

==== Samboan ====
Samboan Mayoral election
Party	Candidate	Votes	%
NPC	Emerito Calderon Jr.	7,024	68.30
PDP–Laban	Restito Catipay	3,260	31.69
Total votes		10,284	100.00

==== Santander ====
Santander Mayoral election
Party	Candidate	Votes	%
NPC	Marites Buscato	7,455	78.66
PDP–Laban	Fausto Rabadon Jr.	2,022	21.33
Total votes		9,477	100.00

=== 3rd District, mayoral elections ===
==== Toledo City ====
Toledo City Mayoral election
Party	Candidate	Votes	%
Independent	Marjorie Perales	34,960	42.37
PDP–Laban	Arlene Zambo	34,319	41.60
NPC	Walter Lao	10,869	13.17
Independent	Merly Abad	2,346	2.84
Total votes		82,494	100.00

==== Aloguinsan ====
Aloguinsan Mayoral election
Party	Candidate	Votes	%
PDP–Laban	Cesare Ignatius Moreno	12,536	80.32
NPC	Socorro Alma Gacang	3,070	19.67
Total votes		15,606	100.00

==== Asturias ====
Asturias Mayoral election
Party	Candidate	Votes	%
PDP–Laban	Jose Antonio Pintor	14,485	53.56
NPC	Joel Dumdum	12,555	46.43
Total votes		27,040	100.00

==== Balamban ====
Balamban Mayoral election
Party	Candidate	Votes	%
1-Cebu	Alex Binghay	35,238	100.00
Total votes		35,238	100.00

==== Barili ====
Barili Mayoral election
Party	Candidate	Votes	%
PDP–Laban	Marlon Garcia	22,860	58.68
NPC	Teresito Mariñas	15,856	40.70
Independent	Candido Caquilala	129	0.33
Independent	Feliciano Arias	111	0.28
Total votes		38,956	100.00

==== Pinamungajan ====
Pinamungajan Mayoral election
Party	Candidate	Votes	%
1-Cebu	Glenn Baricuatro	21,400	59.72
NPC	Maria Honeylette Yapha	14,432	40.27
Total votes		35,832	100.00

==== Tuburan ====
Tuburan Mayoral election
Party	Candidate	Votes	%
NPC	Danilo Diamante	21,099	54.17
1-Cebu	Daphne Lagon	17,846	45.82
Total votes		38,945	100.00

=== 4th District, mayoral elections ===
==== Bogo ====
Bogo Mayoral election
Party	Candidate	Votes	%
NPC	Carlo Jose Martinez	33,198	82.91
NUP	Arturo Pacifico	6,840	17.08
Total votes		40,038	100.00

==== Bantayan ====
Bantayan Mayoral election
Party	Candidate	Votes	%
NPC	Arthur Despi	17,095	52.46
PDP–Laban	Geralyn Escario-Cañares	15,049	46.18
Independent	Arsenio Mata	442	1.35
Total votes		32,586	100.00

==== Daanbantayan ====
Daanbantayan Mayoral election
Party	Candidate	Votes	%
NUP	Sun Shimura	22,989	54.94
NPC	Renillo Gullem	18,541	44.31
Independent	Arsenio Luciano	312	0.74
Total votes		41,842	100.00

==== Madridejos ====
Madridejos Mayoral election
Party	Candidate	Votes	%
Nacionalista	Salvador Dela Fuente	13,507	75.16
Independent	Sergelito Jarina	4,462	24.83
Total votes		17,969	100.00

==== Medellin ====
Medellin Mayoral election
Party	Candidate	Votes	%
NUP	Joven Mondigo Jr.	20,911	100.00
Total votes		20,911	100.00

==== San Remigio ====
San Remigio Mayoral election
Party	Candidate	Votes	%
NPC	Mariano Martinez	23,490	100.00
Total votes		23,490	100.00

==== Santa Fe ====
Santa Fe Mayoral election
Party	Candidate	Votes	%
NUP	Ithamar Espinosa	8,271	54.20
NPC	Jose Esgana	6,989	45.79
Total votes		15,260	100.00

==== Tabogon ====
Tabogon Mayoral election
Party	Candidate	Votes	%
NUP	Zigfred Duterte	16,950	89.97
Independent	Trinidad Manloloyo IV	1,280	6.79
Independent	Roel Amistoso	608	3.22
Total votes		18,838	100.00

==== Tabuelan ====
Tabuelan Mayoral election
Party	Candidate	Votes	%
NUP	Raul Gerona	11,377	73.52
NPC	Ronilo Diamante	3,583	23.15
Independent	Joel Gerona	514	3.32
Total votes		15,474	100.00

=== 5th District, mayoral elections ===
==== Danao ====
Danao mayoral election
Party	Candidate	Votes	%
BAKUD	Ramon Durano III	41,767	64.60
1-Cebu	Eleanore Duterte	22,883	35.39
Total votes		64,650	100.00

==== Borbon ====
Borbon Mayoral election
Party	Candidate	Votes	%
PDP–Laban	Noel Dotillos	11,552	57.01
BAKUD	Neal Vergara	8,594	42.41
Independent	Joshua Polinag	115	0.56
Total votes		20,261	100.00

==== Carmen ====
Carmen Mayoral election
Party	Candidate	Votes	%
BAKUD	Carlo Villamor	16,931	60.12
Independent	Antonio Awing	9,355	33.22
Independent	Sonia Pua	1,654	5.87
Independent	Virgilio Escoton	220	0.78
Total votes		28,160	100.00

==== Catmon ====
Catmon Mayoral election
Party	Candidate	Votes	%
BAKUD	Irish Baylon-Gestopa	8,585	55.43
PDP–Laban	Avis Monleon	6,902	44.56
Total votes		15,487	100.00

==== Compostela ====
Compostela Mayoral election
Party	Candidate	Votes	%
BAKUD	Froilan Quiño	16,007	63.11
PDP–Laban	Ritchie Wagas	8,437	33.26
Independent	Renan Wagas	917	3.61
Total votes		25,361	100.00

==== Liloan ====
Liloan Mayoral election
Party	Candidate	Votes	%
PDP–Laban	Maria Esperanza Christina Frasco	31,850	57.47
BAKUD	Ulric Cañete	23,566	42.52
Total votes		55,416	100.00

==== Pilar ====
Pilar Mayoral election
Party	Candidate	Votes	%
BAKUD	Manuel Santiago	3,852	52.01
PDP–Laban	Eufracio Maratas Jr.	3,554	47.98
Total votes		7,406	100.00

==== Poro ====
Poro Mayoral election
Party	Candidate	Votes	%
BAKUD	Edgar Rama	7,425	62.60
Independent	Emie Carcellar Jr.	2,959	24.94
PDP–Laban	Jay Estrera	1,477	12.45
Total votes		11,861	100.00

==== San Francisco ====
San Francisco Mayoral election
Party	Candidate	Votes	%
BAKUD	Alfredo Arquillano Jr.	13,918	56.36
PDP–Laban	Hector Capao	10,776	43.63
Total votes		24,694	100.00

==== Sogod ====
Sogod Mayoral election
Party	Candidate	Votes	%
BAKUD	Richard Streegan	14,871	82.89
1-Cebu	Fruclina Gesulga	2,495	13.90
Independent	Lowe Arnado	574	3.19
Total votes		17,940	100.00

==== Tudela ====
Tudela Mayoral election
Party	Candidate	Votes	%
BAKUD	Greman Solante	3,613	56.21
PDP–Laban	Ann Tirando	2,729	42.46
Independent	Cristine Uy	85	1.32
Total votes		6,427	100.00

=== 6th District, mayoral elections ===
==== Mandaue City ====
Mandaue City Mayoral election
Party	Candidate	Votes	%
PDP–Laban	Jonas Cortes	101,641	62.49
NPC	Gabriel Luis Quisumbing	58,842	36.18
Independent	Eric Fortuna	1,307	0.80
Independent	Wilmer Zanoria	842	0.51
Total votes		162,632	100.00

==== Consolacion ====
Consolacion Mayoral election
Party	Candidate	Votes	%
PDP–Laban	Joannes Alegado	47,833	100.00
Total votes		47,833	100.00

==== Cordova ====
Cordova Mayoral election
Party	Candidate	Votes	%
PDP–Laban	Mary Therese Cho	18,775	63.16
UNA	Boyet Tago	9,449	31.78
Lakas	Pablo Villaber	1,259	4.23
Independent	Sherly Pogoy	242	0.81
Total votes		29,725	100.00

=== 7th District, mayoral elections ===
==== Alcantara ====
Alcantara Mayoral election
Party	Candidate	Votes	%
PDP–Laban	Fritz Lastimoso	5,067	55.37
NPC	Beatriz Caburnay	4,084	44.62
Total votes		9,151	100.00

==== Alegria ====
Alegria Mayoral election
Party	Candidate	Votes	%
NPC	Verna Magallon	8,631	63.11
PDP–Laban	Raul Guisadio	5,045	36.88
Total votes		13,676	100.00

==== Badian ====
Badian Mayoral election
Party	Candidate	Votes	%
NPC	Carmencita Lumain	16,666	100.00
Total votes		16,666	100.00

==== Dumanjug ====
Dumanjug Mayoral election
Party	Candidate	Votes	%
NPC	Efren Guntrano Gica	17,608	60.79
PDP–Laban	Cesar Baricuatro	11,354	39.20
Total votes		28,962	100.00

==== Ginatilan ====
Ginatilan Mayoral election
Party	Candidate	Votes	%
NPC	Dean Michael Singco	5,432	50.55
PDP–Laban	Ritzi Tolabing	5,312	49.44
Total votes		10,744	100.00

==== Malabuyoc ====
Malabuyoc Mayoral election
Party	Candidate	Votes	%
PDP–Laban	Lito Narciso Creus	5,915	52.18
NPC	Erlinda Piedad	5,420	47.81
Total votes		11,335	100.00

==== Moalboal ====
Moalboal Mayoral election
Party	Candidate	Votes	%
NPC	Paz Rozgoni	9,686	57.49
Independent	Raymond Mendoza	6,090	36.14
Independent	Narciso Apollo	816	4.84
Independent	Richard Domugho	256	1.51
Total votes		16,848	100.00

==== Ronda ====
Ronda Mayoral election
Party	Candidate	Votes	%
NPC	Mariano Terence Blanco	6,889	56.28
PDP–Laban	Sisinia Rosalinda Acosta	5,201	42.49
Independent	Fiel Condiman	150	1.22
Total votes		12,240	100.00

=== Cebu City, mayoral elections ===
Cebu City Mayoral election
Party	Candidate	Votes	%
PDP–Laban	Edgardo Labella	265,738	51.40
LDP	Tomas Osmeña	246,813	47.74
Independent	Paulino Osmeña	2,735	0.53
Independent	Junry Concepcion	1,000	0.19
Independent	John Edwin Dayondon	703	0.14
Total votes		516,989	100.00

=== Lapu-Lapu City, mayoral elections ===
Lapu-Lapu City Mayoral election
Party	Candidate	Votes	%
PDP–Laban	Junard Chan	85,976	54.41
Lakas	Arturo Radaza	66,108	41.83
UNA	Rolando Patalinjug	5,151	3.26
Independent	Paulo Cabahug	623	0.39
Independent	Virgilio Cano	146	0.09
Total votes		158,004	100.00
