= 2025 Cebu local elections =

Philippine local elections

- Gubernatorial election
- May 12, 2025
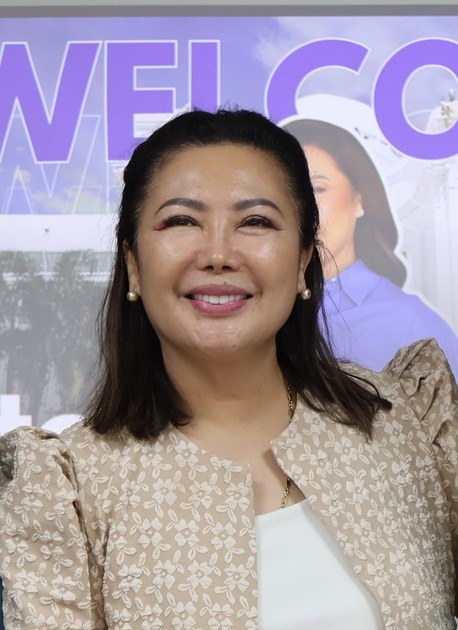

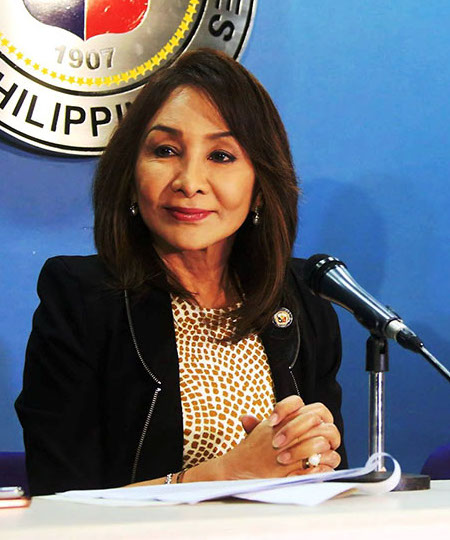
Nominee	Pam Baricuatro	Gwendolyn Garcia
Party	PDP	1CEBU
Running mate	Joselito Ruiz	Glenn Soco
Popular vote	1,107,924	765,051
Percentage	58.11%	40.13%
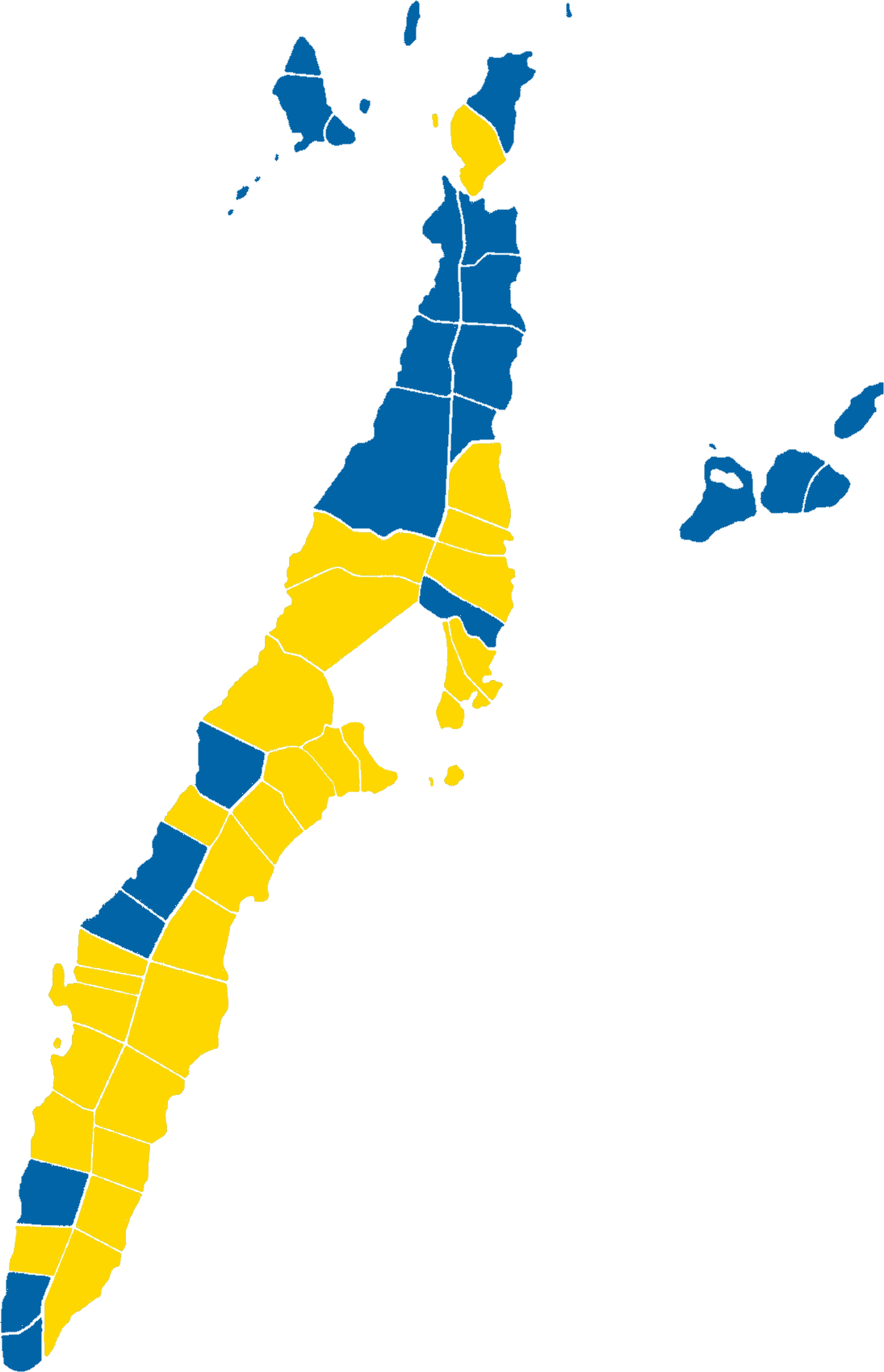
- Baricuatro Garcia
Governor before election
Gwendolyn Garcia
1CEBU
Elected Governor
Pam Baricuatro
PDP
- Vice gubernatorial election
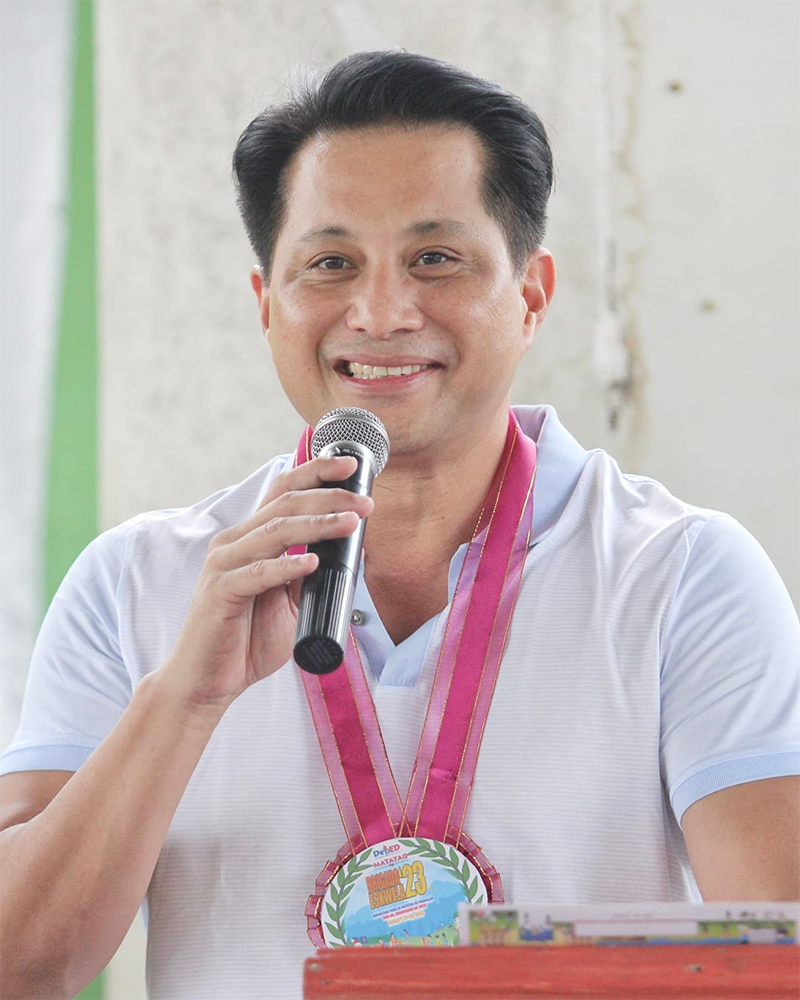
Nominee	Glenn Soco	Joselito Ruiz
Party	1CEBU	Independent
Popular vote	1,090,199	414,403
Percentage	72.46%	27.54%
Vice Governor before election
Hilario Davide III
Liberal
Elected Vice Governor
Glenn Soco
1CEBU
- Provincial Board election

16 out of 19 seats in the Cebu Provincial Board 10 seats needed for a majority
	First party	Second party	Third party
Party	1CEBU	Nacionalista	Lakas
Last election	3 seats, 21.95%	2 seats, 16.57%	Did not participate
Seats before	1 seats	3 seats	0 seats
Seats won	12	2	2
Seat change	▲11	▼1	▲2
Popular vote	1,463,453	349,055	243,636
Percentage	59.85	14.28	9.97

Local elections were held in the province of Cebu on May 12, 2025, as part of the 2025 Philippine general election. Voters elected candidates for all local positions: town mayor, vice mayor, and town councilors, as well as members of the Sangguniang Panlalawigan, the vice governor, governor, and representatives for the seven legislative districts of Cebu (including two districts of Cebu City, the lone district of Lapu-Lapu City, and the lone district of Mandaue City).

Pam Baricuatro, backed by Duterte's PDP, emerged victorious in the gubernatorial race, defeating incumbent Gwendolyn Garcia, who was also supported by the current administration. However, Baricuatro's running mate, Joselito Ruiz, was defeated by Glenn Soco in the vice gubernatorial race.

== Provincial Elections ==
All incumbents are marked in Italics.

=== Governor ===
Incumbent Gwendolyn Garcia (One Cebu) is running for a third term. She was re-elected with 80.80% of the vote in 2022.

Garcia is running against Pam Baricuatro (Partido Demokratiko Pilipino) and Valeriano Gingco (Independent).

Cebu 2025 Gubernatorial election
Party	Candidate	Votes	%
PDP–Laban	Pam Baricuatro	1,107,924	58.11
1CEBU	Gwendolyn Garcia	765,051	40.13
Independent	Valeriano Ginco	33,563	1.76
Total votes		1,906,538	100%

=== Vice Governor ===
Incumbent Hilario Davide III (Independent) is running for the House of Representatives in Cebu's 2nd legislative district. He was re-elected under the Liberal Party with 50.60% of the vote in 2022.

The candidates for vice governor are Cebu board member Glenn Soco (One Cebu) and former Department of the Interior and Local Government undersecretary Joselito Ruiz (Independent).

Cebu 2025 Vice gubernatorial election
Party	Candidate	Votes	%
1CEBU	Glenn Soco	1,090,199	72.46
Independent	Joselito Ruiz	414,403	27.54
Total votes		1,504,602	100%

=== Provincial Board ===
Following a Supreme Court ruling in 2023 on provincial board representation for component cities having their own legislative districts, the Cebu Provincial Board is composed of 19 board members, 16 of whom are elected.

Party	Votes	%	Seats
One Cebu	1,463,453	59.89	12
Nacionalista Party	349,055	14.28	2
Lakas–CMD	243,636	9.97	2
Barug Alang sa Kauswagan ug Demokrasya	159,001	6.51	0
Independent	148,637	6.08	0
National Unity Party	60,262	2.47	0
Partido Federal ng Pilipinas	19,559	0.80	0
Ex officio seats			3
Total	2,443,603	100.00	19

==== 1st district ====
- City: Carcar, Naga, Talisay
- Municipalities: Minglanilla, San Fernando, Sibonga

Incumbent Board Members Yolanda Daan and Raul Bacaltos are term-limited and is prohibited to run for a fourth consecutive term. Former Talisay City Councilor Antonio Bacaltos Jr. and Former San Fernando Mayor Lakambini Reluya are running for their first term. Both are unopposed.

Cebu 1st District Sangguniang Panlalawigan election
Party	Candidate	Votes	%
Nacionalista	Antonio 'Jojo' Bacaltos Jr.	209,375	59.98
Nacionalista	Lakambini Reluya	139,680	40.02
Total votes		349,055	100%

==== 2nd district ====
- Municipalities: Alcoy, Argao, Boljoon, Dalaguete, Oslob, Samboan, Santander

Incumbent Board Members Stanley Caminero and Raymond Calderon are running for a second term.

Cebu 2nd District Sangguniang Panlalawigan election
Party	Candidate	Votes	%
1CEBU	Stanley 'Doc Stanley' Caminero	92,958	44.10
1CEBU	Raymond Calderon	66,252	31.43
Independent	Odysseus 'Doc Ody' Camarillo	51,580	24.47
Total votes		210,790	100%

==== 3rd District ====
- City: Toledo
- Municipalities: Aloguinsan, Asturias, Balamban, Barili, Pinamungajan, Tuburan

Incumbent Member Victoria Corominas-Toribio is term-limited and is prohibited to run for a fourth consecutive term, while Incumbent Member John Ismael Borgonia is running for a third term. On March 24, 2025, Borgonia withdrew his candidacy, citing problems with party support and logistics. However, COMELEC clarified that his name can no longer be removed from the official ballot, and any votes cast for him will be considered stray and will not be counted.

Cebu 3rd District Sangguniang Panlalawigan election
Party	Candidate	Votes	%
1CEBU	Julius Anthony 'Oloy' Corominas	127,330	35.52
Lakas	Dason Lorenz Lagon	87,737	24.48
1CEBU	John Ismael 'Atty. Jiembo' Borgonia (withdrew)	123,803	34.54
PFP	Farid Baena	19,559	5.46
Total votes		358,429	100%

==== 4th District ====
- City: Bogo
- Municipalities: Bantayan, Daanbantayan, Madridejos, Medellin, San Remigio, Santa Fe, Tabogon, Tabuelan

Incumbent Member Horacio Paul Franco died while in office in 2022, he was replaced by his wife Minuel Carmela Franco who opted not to run for re-election. Incumbent Member Kerrie Shimura is running for a third term.

Cebu 4th District Sangguniang Panlalawigan election
Party	Candidate	Votes	%
1CEBU	Kerrie Keane Shimura	164,718	42.80
1CEBU	Nelson Mondigo	94,032	24.44
Independent	Frederick 'Icky' Salazar	65,807	17.10
NUP	Jenny Armamento	60,262	15.66
Total votes		384,819	100%

==== 5th District ====
- City: Danao
- Municipalities: Borbon, Carmen, Catmon, Compostela, Liloan, Pilar, Poro, San Francisco, Sogod, Tudela

Incumbent Members Andrei Duterte and Michael Joseph Villamor is running for third and second term, respectively.

Cebu 5th District Sangguniang Panlalawigan election
Party	Candidate	Votes	%
1CEBU	Andrei 'Red' Duterte	200,271	38.82
1CEBU	Michael Joseph 'Mike' Villamor	156,605	30.36
BAKUD	Rosemary St. Vincent 'Binky' Durano-Sybico	89,485	17.35
BAKUD	Adrian 'Doc Adi' Pilones	69,516	13.48
Total votes		515,877	100%

==== 6th District ====
- Municipalities: Consolacion, Cordova

The city of Mandaue used to be under this provincial district until a Supreme Court ruling in 2023 created a separate provincial district for the city.

Incumbent Member Jonkie Ouano is term-limited and is running for Mandaue City Mayor. Incumbent Member Glenn Soco opted to run as Vice Governor and won.

Cebu 6th District Sangguniang Panlalawigan election
Party	Candidate	Votes	%
1CEBU	Dason Larenz Lagon	87,744	60.21
Lakas	Alfred Francis 'Alfie' Ouano	57,978	39.79
Total votes		145,722	100%

==== 7th District ====
- Municipalities: Alcantara, Alegria, Badian, Dumanjug, Ginatilan, Malabuyoc, Moalboal, Ronda

Incumbent Member Jerome Librando is term-limited and is prohibited to run for a third consecutive term. Incumbent Member Cesar Baricuatro is running for a second term.

Cebu 7th District Sangguniang Panlalawigan election
Party	Candidate	Votes	%
1CEBU	Paz 'Lingling' Rozgoni	66,367	45.03
1CEBU	Cesar 'Sarsi' Baricuatro	65,411	44.38
Independent	Lorenzo 'Bro.Lorenz' Lorono	15,602	10.59
Total votes		147,380	100%

==== Mandaue City ====
Following a Supreme Court ruling in 2023, a provincial district was created for the city of Mandaue, which used to be under the 6th provincial district. Two board members are elected from this provincial district.

Incumbent Mandaue City Councilor Malcolm Sanchez is running for his first term in the newly created district.

Mandaue City Lone District Sangguniang Panlalawigan election
Party	Candidate	Votes	%
1CEBU	Malcolm Sanchez	107,453	38.38
Lakas	Nilo 'Olin' Seno	97,921	34.98
1CEBU	Jesse James 'JJ'Go	58,929	21.05
Independent	Wilmer Zanoria	15,648	5.59
Total votes		279,951	100%

== Congressional Elections ==
=== 1st District ===
- City: Carcar, Naga, Talisay
- Municipalities: Minglanilla, San Fernando, Sibonga

Incumbent Representative Rhea Gullas is running for second term and is running unopposed.

2025 Philippine House of Representatives election at Cebu's 1st District
Party	Candidate	Votes	%
Lakas	Rhea Gullas	282,814	100%
Total votes		282,814	100%

=== 2nd district ===
- Municipalities: Alcoy, Argao, Boljoon, Dalaguete, Oslob, Samboan, Santander

Incumbent Representative Edsel Galeos is running for a second term. Incumbent Vice Governor Hilario Davide III is also running for congress

2025 Philippine House of Representatives election in Cebu's 2nd District
Party	Candidate	Votes	%
Lakas	Edsel Galeos	91,984	60.48
Independent	Hilario 'Junjun' Davide	60,111	39.52
Total votes		152,095	100%

=== 3rd District ===
- City: Toledo
- Municipalities: Aloguinsan, Asturias, Balamban, Barili, Pinamungajan, Tuburan

Incumbent Representative Pablo John Garcia is running for a third term, However, on October 8, 2025, he withdrew his Certificate of Candidacy in order to pursue career advancement and personal projects that had been put on hold due to his duties at the Congress. He was replaced by his wife Karen Flores-Garcia and is running unopposed.

2025 Philippine House of Representatives election at Cebu's 3rd District
Party	Candidate	Votes	%
NUP	Karen Flores-Garcia	155,730	100%
Total votes		155,730	100%

=== 4th District ===
- City: Bogo
- Municipalities: Bantayan, Daanbantayan, Madridejos, Medellin, San Remigio, Santa Fe, Tabogon, Tabuelan

Incumbent Representative Janice Salimbangon is running for a third term. Also running for congress is Daanbantayan Mayor Sun Shimura.

2025 Philippine House of Representatives election in Cebu's 4th District
Party	Candidate	Votes	%
PMP	Sun Shimura	149,336	52.56
NUP	Janice Salimbangon	132,302	46.56
Independent	Salvadore 'Sal Arapal' Cariaga	2,509	0.88
Total votes		284,147	100%

=== 5th District ===
- City: Danao
- Municipalities: Borbon, Carmen, Catmon, Compostela, Liloan, Pilar, Poro, San Francisco, Sogod, Tudela

Incumbent Representative and Deputy Speaker Duke Frasco is running for a third term. Also running for the seat is Danao City Mayor Mix Durano.

2025 Philippine House of Representatives election in Cebu's 5th District
Party	Candidate	Votes	%
NUP	Vincent Franco 'Duke' Frasco	217,303	62.01
Independent	Thomas Mark 'Mix' Durano	133,102	37.99
Total votes		350,405	100%

=== 6th District ===
- Municipalities: Consolacion, Cordova

Incumbent Representative Daphne Lagon is running for a second term and is running unopposed.

2025 Philippine House of Representatives election at Cebu's 6th District
Party	Candidate	Votes	%
Lakas	Daphne Lagon	104,768	100%
Total votes		104,768	100%

=== 7th District ===
- Municipalities: Alcantara, Alegria, Badian, Dumanjug, Ginatilan, Malabuyoc, Moalboal, Ronda

Incumbent Representative Peter John Calderon is term-limited and is prohibited to run for a fourth consecutive term. His wife Patricia Calderon is seeking for the seat.

2025 Philippine House of Representatives election in Cebu's 7th District
Party	Candidate	Votes	%
NPC	Patricia Calderon	74,936	59.71
PDP–Laban	Maria Fema Duterte	43,725	34.84
Independent	Joselito 'Lito' Navarro	6,829	5.44
Total votes		125,490	100%

=== Cebu City ===
==== 1st District (North) ====
- Barangays: Adlaon, Agsungot, Apas, Bacayan, Banilad, Binaliw, Budlaan, Busay, Cambinocot, Capitol Site, Carreta, Cogon Ramos, Day‑as, Ermita, Guba, Hipodromo, Kalubihan, Kamagayan, Kamputhaw (Camputhaw), Kasambagan, Lahug, Lorega‑San Miguel, Lusaran, Luz, Mabini, Mabolo, Malubog, Pahina Central, Pari-an, Paril, Pit-os, Pulangbato, Sambag I, Sambag II, San Antonio, San Jose, San Roque, Santa Cruz, Santo Niño (Central), Sirao, T. Padilla (Villa Gonzalo), Talamban, Taptap, Tejero, Tinago, Zapatera

Incumbent Representative Rachel del Mar (running under KUSUG- Panaghiusa coalition) is running for a second term. Also running for the seat is incumbent North District Councilor Mary Ann delos Santos (running under BOPK) and ABC President and City Councilor Franklyn Ong (running under Partido Barug)

2025 Philippine House of Representatives election in Cebu City First District
Party	Candidate	Votes	%
NPC	Rachel del Mar	105,581	42.26
LDP	Franklyn Ong	81,705	32.70
Liberal	Mary Ann de los Santos	60,282	24.13
Independent	Berty Neil 'Bert' Lerios	2,257	0.90
Total votes		249,825	100%

==== 2nd District (South) ====
- Barangays: Babag, Basak Pardo, Basak San Nicolas, Bonbon, Buhisan, Bulacao, Buot, Calamba, Cogon Pardo, Duljo Fatima, Guadalupe, Inayawan, Kalunasan, Kinasang-an Pardo, Labangon, Mambaling, Pahina San Nicolas, Pamutan, Pasil, Poblacion Pardo, Pung-ol Sibugay, Punta Princesa, Quiot, San Nicolas Proper, Sapangdaku, Sawang Calero, Sinsin, Suba, Sudlon I, Sudlon II, Tabunan, Tagbao, Tisa, Toong

Incumbent representative Eduardo Rama Jr. (running under Partido Barug) ran for a second term. Former Cebu City 2nd District respresentative Rodrigo Abellanosa (running under BOPK) attempted to return to congress. Rama successfully defeated his seat and dealt Abellanosa his first-ever electoral defeat.

2025 Philippine House of Representatives election in Cebu City Second District
Party	Candidate	Votes	%
Lakas	Eduardo Rama Jr. (Incumbent)	181,055	57.89
Independent	Rodrigo 'Bebot' Abellanosa	131,723	42.11
Total votes		312,778	100%

=== Lapu-Lapu City ===
Incumbent Representative Ma. Cynthia Chan is eligible for re-election but opted to run for City Mayor. Lapu Lapu City Mayor Junard Chan is running for congress.

2025 Philippine House of Representatives election in Lapu-Lapu Lone District
Party	Candidate	Votes	%
PFP	Junard 'Ahong' Chan	160,447	72.17
PDP–Laban	Ryan Jay Yuson	61,856	27.83
Total votes		222,303	100%

=== Mandaue City ===
Incumbent Representative Emmarie Ouano-Dizon (running under ONE Mandaue) is running for a second term. Former Mandaue City Treasurer Atty. Regal Oliva (running under TEAM Mandaue) is also running for congress.

2025 Philippine House of Representatives election in Mandaue Lone District
Party	Candidate	Votes	%
Lakas	Emmarie 'Lolypop' Ouano-Dizon	117,107	59.55
Aksyon	Regal Oliva	79,548	40.45
Total votes		196,555	100%

== City & Municipal Elections ==
=== 1st District ===
==== Carcar City ====
Incumbent Mayor Patrick Barcenas is running for a second term. Former Mayor Mercedita Apura is eying to return to the mayoral post.

Carcar City Mayoral election
Party	Candidate	Votes	%
Nacionalista	Patrick Barcenas	45,889	60.27
NPC	Mercy Apura	29,678	38.98
Independent	Raul Gabijan	572	0.75
Total votes		76,139	100%

Incumbent Vice Mayor Efren Quijano is running for a second term.

Carcar City Vice Mayoral election
Party	Candidate	Votes	%
Nacionalista	Perkins de Dios	34,246	47.11
NPC	Efren Quijano	19,574	26.93
PDP–Laban	Jhufel Alcuizar	18,875	25.96
Total votes		72,695	100%

Carcar City City Council Election
Party	Candidate	Votes	%
Nacionalista	Rey Lawas	42,725	7.02%
Nacionalista	Bebe Barcenas	41,690	6.85%
Independent	Eddie Alberca	40,797	6.7%
Nacionalista	Inting Escobido	39,501	6.49%
NPC	Mich Amistad-Zozobrado	35,424	5.82%
Nacionalista	Jeson Fernandez	35,258	5.79%
Nacionalista	Roy Velez	34,723	5.7%
Nacionalista	Archilles Gantuangco	31,284	5.14%
NPC	Nice Apura	29,874	4.91%
NPC	Lorena Mae Tabora	29,313	4.81%
Nacionalista	Harold Nacua	28,394	4.66%
NPC	Ian Bhokyol Del Rosario	27,069	4.44%
Nacionalista	Kimson Castañares	24,888	4.09%
NPC	Kimbox Lapinid	23,936	3.93%
NPC	Chowking Quijano	19,688	3.23%
NPC	Richard Noel Barangan	17,762	2.92%
Nacionalista	Rogelio Baran	16,935	2.78%
Nacionalista	Danilo Satinitigan	16,456	2.7%
NPC	Ed Lawas	15,796	2.59%
Independent	Romart Tangaro	12,858	2.11%
NPC	Kashii Delacerna-Apostol	12,697	2.08%
NPC	Marco Espiritu	10,226	1.68%
PDP–Laban	Juric Sato	7,581	1.24%
PDP–Laban	Daddy Bonch Yamid	7,444	1.22%
Independent	Manolito Languido	4,611	0.76%
Independent	Jonathan Lapaz	2,057	0.34%
Total votes		608,987	100.00%

==== Naga City ====
Incumbent Mayor Valdemar Chiong is running for a second term.

Naga City Mayoral election
Party	Candidate	Votes	%
Nacionalista	Valdemar Chiong	63,102	94.96
Independent	Manny Sanchez	3,348	5.04
Total votes		66,450	100%

Incumbent Vice Mayor Virgilio Chiong is running for a second term and is unopposed.

Naga City Vice Mayoral election
Party	Candidate	Votes	%
Nacionalista	Virgilio Chiong	56,492	100
Total votes		56,492	100%

Naga City City Council Election
Party	Candidate	Votes	%
Nacionalista	Clint Isidro Chiong	45,849	10.02%
Nacionalista	Alex Lara	38,890	8.5%
Nacionalista	Domer Libor	37,688	8.23%
Nacionalista	Aniceto Alinsonorin	35,998	7.86%
Nacionalista	Junjie Navales Cruz	35,875	7.84%
Nacionalista	Charmaine Navarro	35,872	7.84%
Nacionalista	Elmer John Lapitan	35,707	7.8%
Nacionalista	Justino Dakay	34,106	7.45%
Nacionalista	Ray Manabat	31,905	6.97%
Nacionalista	Letty Abangan	31,415	6.86%
Liberal	Venci Del Mar	23,906	5.22%
Independent	Boy Tablate	18,750	4.1%
Independent	Theresa Palarion	12,745	2.78%
Independent	Kenneth Abella	10,000	2.18%
Independent	Normando Panilag	9,402	2.05%
Liberal	Fabie Villasencio	7,761	1.7%
Independent	Uni Abella	7,044	1.54%
Independent	Undo Reroma	4,875	1.06%
Total votes		457,788	100.00%

==== Talisay City ====
Incumbent Mayor Samsam Gullas is running for a third term and is running unopposed.

Talisay City Mayoral election
Party	Candidate	Votes	%
Nacionalista	Samsam Gullas	115,825	100.00
Total votes		115,825	100%

Incumbent Vice Mayor Choy Aznar is running for a second term and is running unopposed

Talisay City Vice Mayoral election
Party	Candidate	Votes	%
Nacionalista	Richard Francis 'Choy' Aznar	106,186	100.00
Total votes		106,186	100%

==== Minglanilla ====
Incumbent Mayor Rajiv Enad is running for a second term and is running unopposed.

Minglanilla Mayoral election
Party	Candidate	Votes	%
Nacionalista	Rajiv Enad	61,914	100.00
Total votes		61,914	100%

Incumbent Vice Mayor Elanito Peña is running for a second term and is running unopposed.

Minglanilla Vice Mayoral election
Party	Candidate	Votes	%
Nacionalista	Elanito Peña	57,571	100.00
Total votes		57,571	100%

Minglanilla Municipal Council Election
Party	Candidate	Votes	%
Nacionalista	Lheslen Enad	56,656	12.88%
Nacionalista	Jay-R De La Calzada	51,076	11.62%
Nacionalista	Jong-Jong Adlawan	43,697	9.94%
Nacionalista	Atty. Boyet Velez	37,056	8.43%
Nacionalista	Kap Mulot Laput	36,569	8.32%
Nacionalista	Kap Jehn Lariosa	36,475	8.29%
Nacionalista	Jerry Cañares	32,016	7.28%
Nacionalista	Jaime Caumeran	30,247	6.88%
NUP	Jyra Lapitan	29,531	6.72%
Independent	Jenny Young	25,596	5.82%
Independent	Jojo Selma	22,150	5.04%
Independent	Loben Geonzon	16,692	3.8%
Independent	Engr. Roy Nacario	14,841	3.37%
Independent	Alejandro Bastida	4,629	1.05%
Independent	Tony Tan	2,506	0.57%
Total votes		439,288	100.00%

==== San Fernando (Cebu) ====
Incumbent Mayor Mytha Canoy is running for a second term and is running unopposed.

San Fernando Mayoral election
Party	Candidate	Votes	%
Nacionalista	Mytha Canoy	34,571	100.00
Total votes		34,571	100%

Incumbent Vice Mayor Ricci Regen Reluya is running for a second term. Incumbent SB Member Gema Bacalla is also running for the post.

San Fernando Vice Mayoral election
Party	Candidate	Votes	%
Nacionalista	Gema Bacalla	20,805	50.33
NPC	Ricci Regen Reluya	20,534	49.67
Total votes		41,339	100%

San Fernando Municipal Council Election
Party	Candidate	Votes	%
Nacionalista	PJ Medalla	28,866	11.43%
Nacionalista	Carlos Miguel Canoy	27,251	10.79%
Nacionalista	Rizza Canoy	23,773	9.41%
Nacionalista	Libby Manlosa	21,147	8.37%
Nacionalista	Jovie Aratia	20,998	8.31%
Nacionalista	Juvy Procianos	19,735	7.81%
Nacionalista	Cocoy Enad	19,011	7.53%
Nacionalista	Sulping Alguire	18,944	7.50%
Independent	Leizel Garcia	17,682	7.00%
NPC	Travis Reluya	17,670	7.00%
NPC	Talino Villasan	11,068	4.38%
NPC	Jayvee Sebial	10,489	4.15%
NPC	Joemar Romano	8,122	3.22%
Independent	Rea Ramirez	3,719	1.47%
Independent	Doter Geocallo	2,389	0.95%
Independent	Jesus Christ Talledo	1,702	0.67%
Total votes		252,867	100.00%

==== Sibonga ====
Incumbent Mayor Lionel Bacaltos died while in office last 2024, Vice Mayor Mariano Ponce took over in accordance to the Order of succession. Ponce opted to run for vice mayor. Incumbent councilor Caroline Bacaltos is running for the position where she was the mayor from 2016 to 2019.

Sibonga Mayoral election
Party	Candidate	Votes	%
Nacionalista	Caroline Bacaltos	20,968	70.86
Independent	Nestor Ponce	8,504	28.74
Independent	Eutiquijo Vilocura Jr.	117	0.4
Total votes		34,444	100%

Incumbent Vice Mayor Joel Ponce opted to run for councilor. Mayor Mariano Ponce is running back to his former post and is unopposed.

Sibonga Vice Mayoral election
Party	Candidate	Votes	%
Nacionalista	Mariano 'Dotis' Ponce	24,917	100.00
Total votes		24,917	100%

Sibonga Municipal Council Election
Party	Candidate	Votes	%
Nacionalista	Joel Ponce	23,294	11.47
Nacionalista	Lorraine Khate Bacaltos	19,771	9.74
Nacionalista	Eloisa Bacaltos	19,593	9.65
Nacionalista	Michelle Caballes	17,569	8.65
Nacionalista	Cirila Dela Cruz	12,917	6.36
Nacionalista	Tommy Codilla	12,223	6.02
Nacionalista	Rolando Dela Vega	9,772	4.81
Liberal	Joejie Chan	9,736	4.8
Liberal	Noel Ponce	9,613	4.73
Liberal	Gina Patalinghug	8,740	4.3
Independent	Sally Blanco	7,615	3.75
Liberal	Mariano Marvin Lee	7,375	3.63
Liberal	Elerio Alima	6,931	3.41
Independent	Glenn Milagrosa	6,016	2.96
Nacionalista	Fortunato Jr. Diez	4,035	1.99
Liberal	Clint John Recopilacion	3,229	1.59
Independent	Puyot Uytico	902	0.44
Independent	Sweet Secretaria	611	0.3
Independent	Dolreich Cabilao	590	0.29
Independent	Rizalde Dingding	318	0.16
Independent	Dexter Magallano	311	0.15
Total votes		203,199	100.00

=== 2nd District ===
==== Alcoy ====
Incumbent Mayor Michael Sestoso is term-limited and is prohibited to run for a fourth consecutive term. Eugene Singson who run for mayor last 2022 which he lost against Sestoso, is running and is unopposed.

Alcoy Mayoral election
Party	Candidate	Votes	%
1CEBU	Eugene Singson	10,240	100.00
Total votes		10,240	100%

incumbent Vice Mayor Neil Plando is running for councilor. Incumbent Mayor Michael Sestoso is running for vice mayor and is unopposed

Alcoy Vice Mayoral election
Party	Candidate	Votes	%
1CEBU	Michael Sestoso	9,375	100.00
Total votes		9,375	100%

Alcoy Municipal Council Election
Party	Candidate	Votes	%
Independent	Jojo Miñoza	8,980	10.5
Lakas	Jojo Duran	7,705	9.01
Independent	Coach Niño Delos Santos	7,329	8.57
Independent	Guia Romarate	7,235	8.46
1CEBU	Jimmy Abajon	6,041	7.06
Independent	Hank Ocampo	6,098	7.13
1CEBU	Neil Plando	6,472	7.57
1CEBU	Tata Abajon	5,909	6.91
1CEBU	Beroy Carungay	4,551	5.32
1CEBU	Beth Mejares Metcalf	4,820	5.64
Lakas	Charmaigne Gonzales	5,478	6.41
Independent	Ascher Medel	6,659	7.79
Independent	Jun F Fuentes	3,731	4.36
1CEBU	Riric Teo	3,923	4.59
Independent	Gerry Paler	587	0.69
Total votes		85,512	100.00

==== Argao ====
Incumbent Mayor Allan Sesaldo is running for a third term.

Argao Mayoral election
Party	Candidate	Votes	%
1CEBU	Allan Sesaldo	27,358	56.73
Lakas	Clifford 'General' Gairanod	20,869	43.27
Total votes		48,227	100%

Incumbent Vice Mayor Orvi Ortega is running for a second term. Incumbent SB Member Jonathan Villegas Sr. is eying for the post.

Argao Vice Mayoral election
Party	Candidate	Votes	%
Independent	Orvi Ortega	26,300	55.86
Lakas	Jonathan 'Atty.Atan' Villegas Sr.	20,786	44.14
Total votes		47,086	100%

Argao Municipal Council Election
Party	Candidate	Votes	%
1CEBU	Atty. Collin Rizon	25,430	8.99
1CEBU	Doktor Rhine Mamac	24,327	8.60
Independent	Jessa Flores-Mier	23,479	8.30
1CEBU	Bootsie Almirante	19,717	6.97
1CEBU	Kuya Medics Albero	19,569	6.91
Independent	Juncam Caminero	19,143	6.76
1CEBU	Jag-Lucero Bacalso	18,260	6.45
Independent	Vip-Choy Semilla	17,243	6.09
1CEBU	Elican Canada	17,236	6.09
Independent	Mariglen Lucero	16,992	6.00
Independent	Kap Boyet Saragena	12,956	4.58
Lakas	Boy Saniel	12,768	4.51
Lakas	Audrey Sarmago	12,527	4.43
Independent	Atty. Rj Miranda	10,943	3.87
Lakas	Chanito Quiblat	9,416	3.33
Lakas	Parekoy Lanutan	9,134	3.23
Independent	Doc Torre Dela Torre	7,761	2.74
Independent	Roy Sarael	2,142	0.76
Independent	Coach Jun Villamejor	2,011	0.71
Independent	Pito Garganera	1,970	0.70
Total votes		282,935	100.00

==== Boljoon ====
Incumbent Mayor Jojie Derama is running for a second term.

Boljoon Mayoral election
Party	Candidate	Votes	%
1CEBU	Jojie Derama	6,154	60.51
Independent	Alfredo Awe	4,016	39.49
Total votes		10,170	100%

Incumbent Vice Mayor Ervin Villanueva is eligible for a second term but opted to run for councilor. Incumbent SB Member Inday Mubarak Obaid is running for the seat.

Boljoon Vice Mayoral election
Party	Candidate	Votes	%
1CEBU	Feliberta 'Inday' Mubarak Obaid	6,808	68.91
Independent	Archibaldwin 'Baldwin' Navarro	3,071	31.09
Total votes		9,879	100%

Boljoon Mayoral Election
Party	Candidate	Votes	%
Independent	Genus Navarro	6,383	9.81
1CEBU	Merlou Derama	6,253	9.61
1CEBU	Anjo Nicanor	5,965	9.17
Independent	Marvin Ian Niere	5,878	9.04
1CEBU	Monit Fedillaga	5,907	9.08
Independent	Darrel John Felices	5,600	8.61
1CEBU	Ervin Villanueva	5,561	8.55
1CEBU	Lindzey Romero	4,998	7.68
1CEBU	Alexseus Celis	4,965	7.63
Lakas	Rick Bentazal	4,917	7.56
Independent	Edmundo Estavilla	3,906	6.00
Independent	Alberto Ordoña	3,200	4.92
Independent	Enton Figueroa	1,064	1.64
Independent	Orsing Sestoso	454	0.70
Total votes		65,091	100.00

==== Dalaguete ====
Incumbent Mayor Ronald Cesante is running for a second term.

Dalaguete Mayoral election
Party	Candidate	Votes	%
PMP	Nelin 'Bembie' Tambis	22,933	52.47
1CEBU	Ronald Cesante	20,770	47.53
Total votes		43,703	100%

Incumbent Vice Mayor William Lagahid is running for a third term. Incumbent SB Member Jeffrey Belciña is also running for the post.

Dalaguete Vice Mayoral election
Party	Candidate	Votes	%
1CEBU	Wiiliam Lagahid	24,500	58.61
PMP	Jeffrey Belciña	17,305	41.39
Total votes		41,805	100%

Dalaguete Municipal Council Election
Party	Candidate	Votes	%
PMP	Coca Nicohl Bustamante	21,927	7.97
PMP	Lowell Amaya	21,807	7.92
1CEBU	Ernesto Tangpos	20,628	7.49
PMP	Andrade Alcantara	19,286	7.01
1CEBU	John Ritz Osorio	18,965	6.89
PMP	Ricardo Villahermosa	17,380	6.31
1CEBU	Kevin Belandres	17,291	6.28
PMP	El-Joesur Survilla	17,034	6.19
PMP	Jose Eser Coronel	15,884	5.77
1CEBU	Rommel Alcantara	15,789	5.74
1CEBU	Felix Villahermosa	15,710	5.71
PMP	Jack Elemino	15,040	5.46
1CEBU	Kap Phine Nepomuceno	14,306	5.20
PMP	Ating Anore	14,134	5.13
1CEBU	Mario Montenegro	12,900	4.69
1CEBU	Bai Ferds Llanos	12,629	4.59
Independent	Sir Ricky Geldore	2,353	0.85
Independent	Emilio Dibdib Jr.	2,227	0.81
Total votes		282,910	100.00

==== Oslob ====
Incumbent Mayor Ronald Guaren is running for a second term. Incumbent Vice Mayor Roger Trapa is also running for mayor.

Oslob Mayoral election
Party	Candidate	Votes	%
1CEBU	Ronald Guaren	10,427	57.32
PMP	Roger Trapa	7,765	42.68
Total votes		18,192	100%

Incumbent Vice Mayor Roger Trapa is eligible for a second term but opted to run for mayor. Former Mayor Jun Tumulak and Incumbent SB Member Edel Nazareno is running.

Oslob Vice Mayoral election
Party	Candidate	Votes	%
1CEBU	Friedel Ricardo 'Edel' Nazareno	9,806	55.34
PMP	Jose 'Jun' Tumulak	7,914	44.66
Total votes		17,720	100%

Oslob Municipal Council Election
Party	Candidate	Votes	%
1CEBU	Eti Franz Barrera	10,562	8.67
1CEBU	Therese Guaren	10,180	8.35
1CEBU	Jose Dodjie Abines	9,558	7.84
1CEBU	Engr. Carlos Mirasol	9,349	7.67
1CEBU	Brando Romares	8,258	6.78
1CEBU	Gwen Gallano	8,186	6.72
1CEBU	Arturo Doroon	8,014	6.58
PMP	Florencio Labiste	8,014	6.58
PMP	Raul Butron	7,790	6.39
PMP	Veronica Rendon	7,357	6.04
1CEBU	Jun Llena	7,182	5.89
PMP	Therese Dalumpines	6,447	5.29
PMP	Luche Abines	6,427	5.27
PMP	Jevey Dacoron	5,272	4.33
PMP	Lino Baguio	5,146	4.22
PMP	Ananias Legarde	4,135	3.39
Total votes		121,877	100.00

==== Samboan ====
Incumbent Mayor Emerito Calderon is running for a third term. His opponent is former DOE Visayas director Mark Gamallo.

Samboan Mayoral election
Party	Candidate	Votes	%
1CEBU	Emerito 'Tito-Tito' Calderon	8,156	62.70
Aksyon	Mark Gamallo	4,851	37.30
Total votes		13,007	100%

Incumbent Vice Mayor Irving Gamallo is running for a third term.

Samboan Vice Mayoral election
Party	Candidate	Votes	%
1CEBU	Irving Gamallo	11,013	94.54
Independent	Peter Bilocura	636	5.46
Total votes		11,649	100%

Oslob Municipal Council Election
Party	Candidate	Votes	%
1CEBU	Eti Franz Barrera	10,562	8.67
1CEBU	Therese Guaren	10,180	8.35
1CEBU	Jose Dodjie Abines	9,558	7.84
1CEBU	Engr. Carlos Mirasol	9,349	7.67
1CEBU	Brando Romares	8,258	6.78
1CEBU	Gwen Gallano	8,186	6.72
1CEBU	Arturo Doroon	8,014	6.58
PMP	Florencio Labiste	8,014	6.58
PMP	Raul Butron	7,790	6.39
PMP	Veronica Rendon	7,357	6.04
1CEBU	Jun Llena	7,182	5.89
PMP	Therese Dalumpines	6,447	5.29
PMP	Luche Abines	6,427	5.27
PMP	Jevey Dacoron	5,272	4.33
PMP	Lino Baguio	5,146	4.22
PMP	Ananias Legarde	4,135	3.39
Total votes		121,877	100.00

==== Santander ====
Incumbent Mayor Marites Buscato is running for a third term.

Santander Mayoral election
Party	Candidate	Votes	%
1CEBU	Marites 'Monic' Buscato	9,956	87.68
Independent	Benny Aseñas	1,349	11.88
Independent	Roy Gumere	50	0.44
Total votes		13,642	100%

Incumbent Vice Mayor Julie Wenceslao is running for a second term.

Santander Vice Mayoral election
Party	Candidate	Votes	%
1CEBU	Julie Wenceslao	9,945	87.83
Independent	Mary Ann Aseñas	1,378	12.17
Total votes		11,323	100%

Santander Municipal Council Election
Party	Candidate	Votes	%
1CEBU	Wilson Wenceslao	9,401	11.99
1CEBU	Joji Culanag	9,036	11.52
1CEBU	Rene Pentac Estaño	8,366	10.67
1CEBU	Manny Regulacion	8,368	10.67
1CEBU	Margie Cajigas	8,042	10.26
1CEBU	Judito Buscato	8,029	10.24
1CEBU	Bambi Buscato	7,846	10.01
1CEBU	Dondon Teves	7,677	9.79
Independent	Ric Zablan	3,413	4.35
Independent	Elecia Luzano	1,266	1.61
Independent	Emeliana Malana	1,110	1.42
Independent	Jun Onlagada	1,029	1.31
Independent	Emmanuel Frejoles	984	1.25
Independent	Lucila Joyohoy	756	0.96
Independent	Junior Rabadon	747	0.95
Independent	Etoy Binondo	694	0.89
Independent	Florenda Miramon	680	0.87
Independent	Renato Ferrater	402	0.51
Independent	John Andry Tesio	329	0.42
Independent	Renaldo Villamor	238	0.30
Total votes		80,751	100.00

=== 3rd District ===
==== Toledo City ====
Incumbent Mayor Marjorie Perales is running for a third term.

Toledo City Mayoral election
Party	Candidate	Votes	%
1CEBU	Marjorie Perales	72,616	68.42
NUP	Ian Zambo	32,419	30.55
PFP	Mansueto Birao	1,096	1.03
Total votes		106,131	100.00
