= Kristine Vanessa Chiong =

Filipina politician

The Honorable Kristine Vanessa Chiong
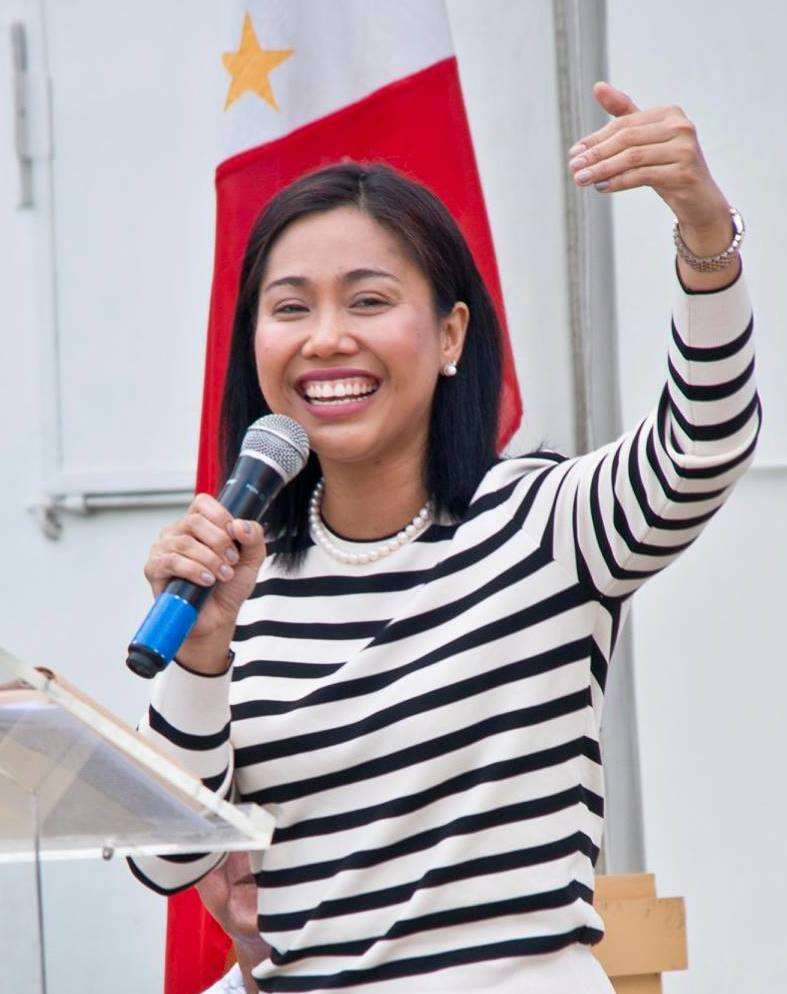

Mayor of Naga
- In office March 16, 2020 – June 30, 2022
- Vice Mayor: Virgilio M. Chiong
- Preceded by: Valdemar Chiong
- Succeeded by: Valdemar Chiong
- In office June 30, 2016 – June 30, 2019
- Vice Mayor: Othello M. Chiong
- Preceded by: Valdemar Chiong
- Succeeded by: Valdemar Chiong

Vice Mayor of Naga
- In office June 30, 2019 – March 16, 2020
- Mayor: Valdemar Chiong
- Preceded by: Othello M. Chiong

Personal details
- Born: Kristine Vanessa Tadiwan Chiong
- Party: Nacionalista
- Profession: Teacher, lawyer

Kristine Vanessa Tadiwan Chiong is a Filipina politician from Naga, Cebu, Philippines. She previously served as the mayor of Naga from 2016 to 2019 and 2020 to 2022. She ran as vice mayor in the 2019 elections and won together with her father, Valdemar Chiong. She assumed the mayoral position after the elder Chiong announced his resignation effective on March 16, 2020.
