= Pam Baricuatro =

Governor of Cebu (born 1966)

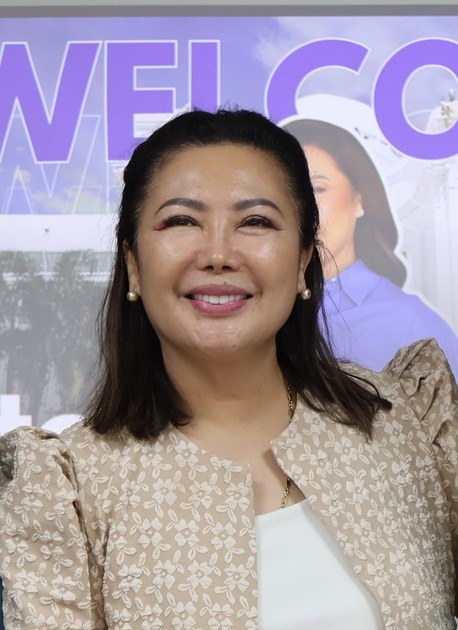
- Baricuatro in 2025

28th Governor of Cebu
- Incumbent
- Assumed office June 30, 2025
- Vice Governor: Glenn Soco
- Preceded by: Gwendolyn Garcia

Personal details
- Born: Pamela Silagan Baricuatro; November 9, 1966 (age 59) Pinamungajan, Cebu, Philippines
- Party: PDP (since 2024)
- Other political affiliations: PFP (until 2024)
- Domestic partner: Brian To
- Children: 1
- Education: University of San Carlos (BA)
- Occupation: Politician; philanthropist; businesswoman; flight attendant (formerly)
- Website: pambaricuatro.com

Pamela "Pam" Silagan Baricuatro (born November 9, 1966) is a Filipino politician and philanthropist who has served as the 28th governor of Cebu since 2025. A member of the Partido Demokratiko Pilipino-Lakas ng Bayan (PDP-Laban), she is the founder of the Visayas-based food bank Simply Share Foundation.

Baricuatro is a graduate of the University of San Carlos. She pursued legal studies at the University of the Visayas before dropping out to work as a flight attendant for Cathay Pacific. She founded the Simply Share Foundation in 2015 and later served as a board executive of the Landbank Resource and Development Corporation during the presidency of Rodrigo Duterte.

In 2025, Baricuatro ran for governor of Cebu under the PDP banner. She positioned herself as an ally of former President Duterte and received endorsements from personalities identified with his camp. Though her campaign had limited political machinery, she defeated incumbent Governor Gwendolyn Garcia in an upset victory. Garcia later contested the results, leading to a contentious transfer of power.

== Early life and education ==
Baricuatro was born on November 9, 1966. She studied at the University of San Carlos in Cebu City, earning a degree in political science. She attended law school at the University of the Visayas but dropped out after her third year when she joined Cathay Pacific as a flight attendant to support her child. Baricuatro also attended formal programs in strategy at the City University of Hong Kong and in public administration at Harvard University.

== Simply Share Foundation ==
In 2015, Baricuatro founded the Simply Share Foundation, the first food bank in Visayas. The organization actively participated in relief efforts following the landfall of Typhoon Odette in 2021, which heavily impacted Cebu. Miss Universe Philippines 2021 titleholder Beatrice Gomez, who hailed from Cebu, rallied support for the foundation and other non-governmental organizations through donation drives in response to the typhoon.

Baricuatro's daughter, Elisse Nicole Catalan, succeeded her as director of the Simply Share Foundation.

=== Legal issues ===
On April 1, 2025, Baricuatro dismissed allegations that the operations of her foundation were a scam, deeming such claims as "political persecution".

On April 5, 2025, the central office of the Department of Social Welfare and Development (DSWD) launched an investigation into the organization after a Facebook post reported that the foundation received a ₱1 million donation from the Philippine Navy in February 2022 while lacking the appropriate permits under the DSWD to operate. A subpoena was issued for Baricuatro on April 2 to appear before the National Bureau of Investigation (NBI). While she expressed confidence in facing the bureau, she did not appear before the NBI on April 7, upon legal advice from her lawyer. The DSWD formally filed a criminal complaint against the organization on April 8, citing violations of the Solicitation Permit Law.

In response to the litigation, Commodore Jose Lito de Guzman, the commander of the Naval Forces Central of the Philippine Navy, clarified that their donations were sourced from voluntary donations from Navy personnel coming from their meal allowances.

== Duterte administration ==
During the Duterte administration, Baricuatro was appointed as a board executive of the Landbank Resource and Development Corporation, where she established political ties with then-Davao City mayor Sara Duterte. Baricuatro served as secretary-general of the Partido Federal ng Pilipinas.

== 2025 Cebu gubernatorial campaign ==
Baricuatro had originally planned to seek a seat in the House of Representatives in 2025, running in Cebu's third district. When Rowena Burden, a critic of incumbent governor Gwendolyn Garcia who was poised as a possible gubernatorial candidate, died on December 15, 2023, she shifted her plans and sought the province's governorship. She filed her certificate of candidacy as a candidate of the Partido Demokratiko Pilipino.

Describing herself as the "people's governor", Baricuatro positioned herself as an ally of former President Rodrigo Duterte and a staunch critic of Governor Garcia. She refused to identify as a politician and capitalized on her image as a philanthropist. During the campaign, Hakbang ng Maisug-Cebu accused Baricuatro of sidelining Duterte-aligned senatorial candidates and questioned her intentions. Baricuatro denied the allegations, insisting that she consistently supported all candidates aligned with the party.

Media outlets such as the Cebu Daily News and Rappler viewed Governor Garcia, who sought re-election, to be heavily favored in the gubernatorial race, owing to her lengthy tenure and consistent electoral strength. Baricuatro, in contrast, was viewed as a neophyte who lacked political machinery, local networks, and funds. In the lead-up to the election, Baricuatro received endorsements from former president Duterte and other Duterte-aligned figures, including his partner Honeylet Avanceña. She also received endorsements from the Barug Alang sa Kauswagan ug Demokrasya, led by Ramon Durano III, the vice mayor of Danao. On March 11, 2025, Baricuatro and independent vice gubernatorial candidate Lito Ruiz allied and began running as a ticket.

On May 12, 2025, Baricuatro was elected governor in an upset victory, defeating Garcia and her other opponents. She won in 29 of the province's cities and municipalities and made inroads in the congressional districts held by Garcia's allies. Allies of former President Duterte regarded Baricuatro's election as a political realignment in the local politics of Cebu.

=== Gubernatorial transition and electoral dispute ===
Baricuatro's victory was proclaimed on May 13 and she promptly became the governor-elect of Cebu. On May 19, Baricuatro announced her transition team, led by lawyer Edmund Lao, and sought the assistance of the Department of the Interior and Local Government and the Philippine National Police in securing a smooth transition of power from the outgoing Garcia administration.

While Garcia created a local government transition team on May 20, Baricuatro accused the outgoing administration of obstructing her gubernatorial transition, describing Garcia's camp as deliberate in their refusal to cooperate. Subsequently, on June 3, Garcia filed an electoral protest before the Commission on Elections (COMELEC), citing "technical and software-proven evidence" that suggests that votes intended for Garcia were counted for Baricuatro in over 4,100 precincts. Baricuatro dismissed the protest, describing Garcia's claims as "baseless and absurd". She asserted that there was "no room for refusal or drama" with her transition to the governorship and left her legal team to address the dispute. Upon receiving the summons from the COMELEC on June 13, Baricuatro maintained that the protest was "without merit". The protest was subsequently dismissed by the COMELEC First Division on November 26, 2025, citing insufficiencies.

== Governor of Cebu (2025–present) ==
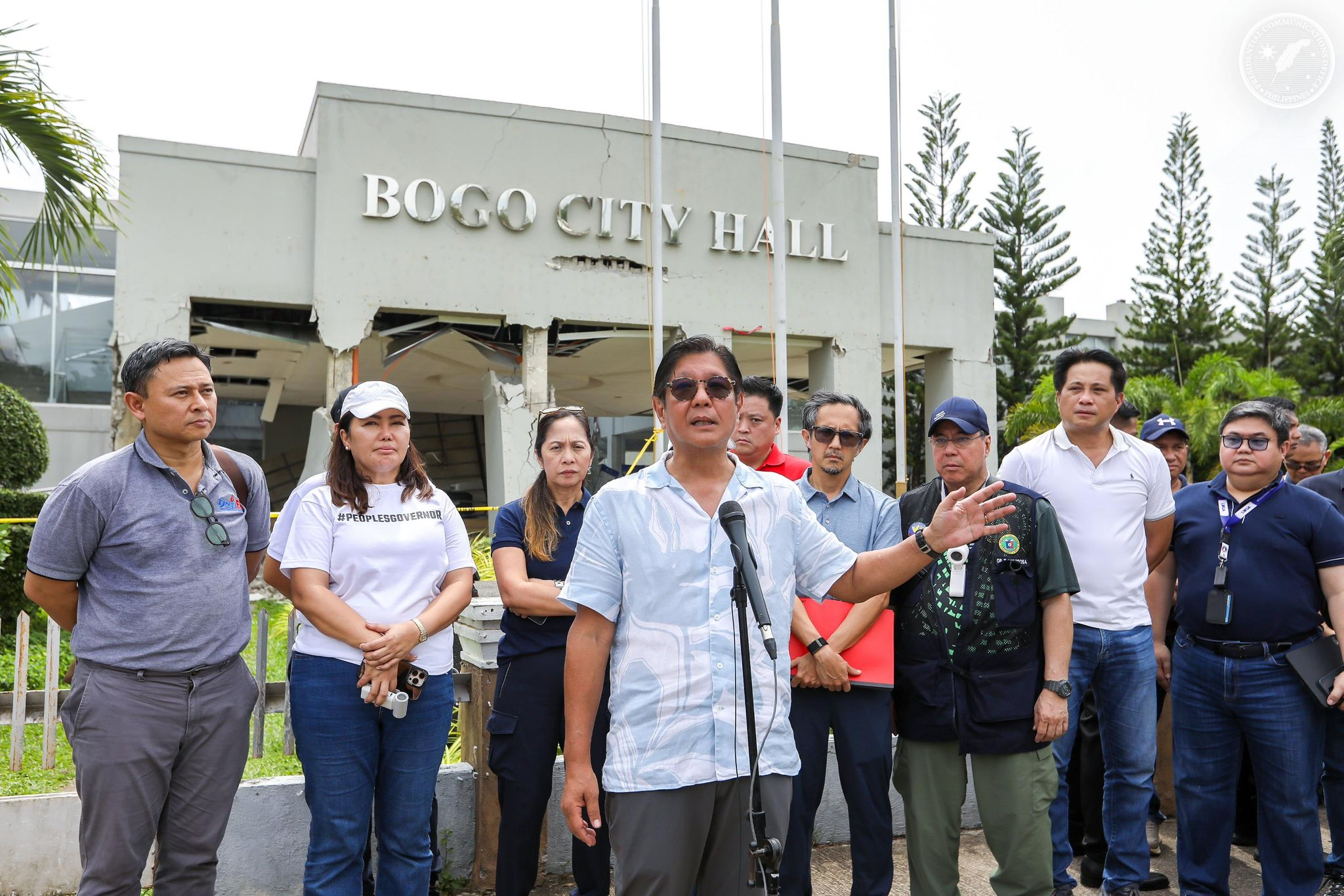
Baricuatro (second on the left) with President Bongbong Marcos (center) after the 6.9 magnitude earthquake in Cebu on October 2, 2025.

Baricuatro's term as the 28th governor of Cebu began on June 30, 2025. She previously took the oath as governor before Judge Anna Marie Militante in a small gathering on May 22 at the Cebu City Sports Club. In her inaugural remarks, she declared financial transparency and public trust as a key mission of her government. Baricuatro appointed former tourism secretary Ace Durano as provincial administrator.

=== Healthcare ===
She has cited healthcare as her priority in her administration. Upon taking office, Baricuatro signed 12 executive orders led by a measure mandating the release of funds for the operation and capacity of all hospitals owned by the province.

=== Tourism ===
On May 21, Baricuatro announced that her administration will discontinue the Pasigarbo sa Sugbo and Suroy-Suroy Sugbo programs instituted by her predecessor, citing challenges in logistics and finance.

== Personal life ==
Baricuatro is a resident of Pinamungajan. She has one child, Elisse Nicole "Nikki", who was born when she was 20 and whom she raised as a single parent.

Baricuatro was close friends with Rowena Burden, who announced her intentions to run for the Cebu governorship before her death. Baricuatro has stated that Burden's death compelled her to seek the governorship herself.

== Electoral history ==
Electoral history of Pam Baricuatro
Year	Office	Party	Votes received				Result
Year	Office	Party	Total	%	P.	Swing	Result
2025	Governor of Cebu	PDP	1,107,924	58.11%	1st	—N/a	Won

Political offices
Preceded by Gwendolyn Garcia	Governor of Cebu; 2025–present	Incumbent
