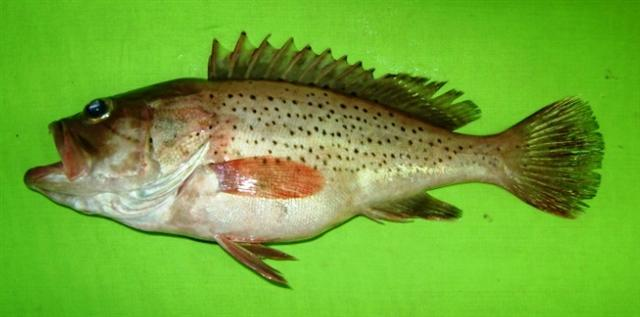

Conservation status
- Least Concern (IUCN 3.1)

Scientific classification
- Kingdom: Animalia
- Phylum: Chordata
- Class: Actinopterygii
- Order: Perciformes
- Family: Epinephelidae
- Genus: Epinephelus
- Species: E. epistictus

Binomial name
- Epinephelus epistictus (Temminck & Schlegel, 1842)

Synonyms
- Serranus epistictus Temminck & Schlegel, 1842; Serranus praeopercularis Boulenger, 1888; Epinephelus praeopercularis (Boulenger, 1888); Epinephelus stigmogrammacus C.T. Cheng & Yang, 1983

= Epinephelus epistictus =

Species of fish

Epinephelus epistictus, the dotted grouper, black-dotted rock-cod, black-spotted grouper, broken-line grouper or spottedback grouper, is a species of marine ray-finned fish, a grouper from the subfamily Epinephelinae which is part of the family Serranidae, which also includes the anthias and sea basses. This species is found in the Indo-Pacific where its distribution ranges form the Red Sea to Australia and Japan. The dotted grouper may grow up to 70–80 cm length. It is a demersal fish found at 70–300 m depths.

== Description ==
The dotted grouper has a body which has a standard length which is around three times its depth. The dorsal profile of the head is a little convex as is the area between the eyes. The preopercle is serrated and projects at its angle where the serrations are enlarged. The dorsal fin contains 11 spines and 14-15 soft rays while the anal fin has 3 spines and 8 soft rays. The membranes between the dorsal fin spines has deep indentations and the caudal fin is moderately rounded. There are 57-70 scales in the lateral line. This grouper has a pale brown to greenish-grey body marked with irregular lines of small dark spots on the flanks and upper body. In some individuals there is a wide dark band running from the eye to the gill cover and two thinner bands running obliquely over the cheek. This species has a maximum total length of 80 centimetres (31 in), although around 70 centimetres (28 in) is more common, and a maximum weight of 7.0 kilograms (15.4 lb).

== Distribution ==
The dotted grouper is found in the Indo-Pacific region. It has a discontinuous distribution which extends from the Red Sea and Gulf of Aden, the coast of East Africa off Eritrea, Kenya, Zanzibar and off southern Mozanmbique and KwaZulu-Natal as well as northwestern Madagascar. In Asia it is found in the Persian Gulf, off India, Indonesia, the South China Sea and southern Japan. In the Pacific it occurs off Papua New Guinea and Australia, although it is rarely sighted in the Philippines, with the only well documented thriving population in the country found in Cebu. It has been recorded in Malaysia.

== Habitat and biology ==
The dotted grouper prefers deeper waters at depths of 71 to 290 metres (233 to 951 ft) and is found over rocky and sandy substrates.

== Taxonomy ==
The dotted grouper was first formally described as Serranus epistictus in 1842 by the Dutch zoologist Coenraad Jacob Temminck (1778-1858) and his student, the German ichthyologist Hermann Schlegel (1804-1884), with the type locality given as Nagasaki. There are some differences in counts of lateral line scales and in the size of the spots and their distribution in fish from the Indian Ocean compared to those taken in the Pacific Ocean.

== Utlisation ==
The dotted grouper is fished for by artisanal and commercial fisheries in Asia.

== Influence ==
The dotted grouper is one of the many known and commonly found grouper species in Cebu, Philippines, where it is given the term Kinsan. Dotted groupers are plentiful in the waters off the coast of Aloguinsan, Cebu. The town's economy, which heavily revolves around fishing, is dependent on most of its catch from the dotted grouper. The town itself was named after the local term of the fish, which the natives thought was the head of the dotted grouper or Ulo sa Kinsan that the Spaniards were referring to, upon which the Spaniards identified the kingdom as "Aloguinsan". As a form of thanksgiving for the abundance of the said grouper fish and as a movement for eco-tourism, the town established a festival named after the dotted grouper. The Kinsan Festival has since become an official festival of Cebu. It is celebrated on the local feast of the town's patron saint, St. Raphael the Archangel, every 2nd Sunday of June..
