= Joannes Alegado =

Filipino politician

The Honorable Joannes Alegado
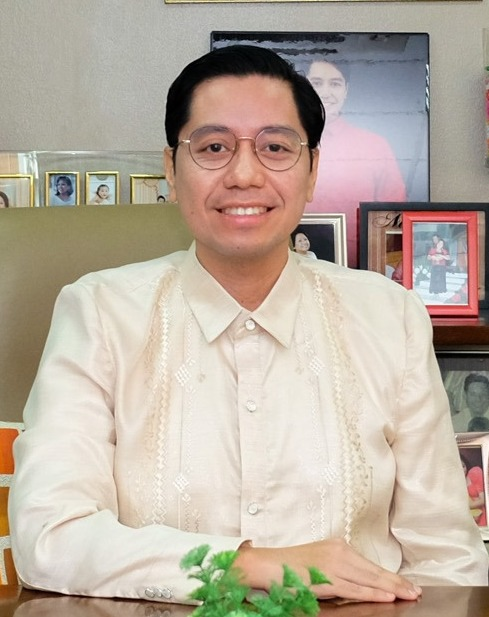

Vice Mayor of Consolacion
- Incumbent
- Assumed office June 30, 2025
- Mayor: Teresa Alegado
- Preceded by: Aurelio Damole

Mayor of Consolacion
- In office June 30, 2019 – June 30, 2022
- Vice Mayor: Teresa Alegado
- Preceded by: Teresa Alegado
- Succeeded by: Teresa Alegado

Member of the Consolacion Municipal Council
- In office June 30, 2016 – June 30, 2019

Personal details
- Born: Joannes Pepito Alegado; January 23, 1981 (age 45) Cebu City, Philippines
- Party: Lakas (2024–present)
- Other political affiliations: PDP (2018–2024); Liberal (2015–2018)
- Profession: Physician

Joannes "Joyjoy" Pepito Alegado is a Filipino politician from Consolacion, Cebu, Philippines. He previously served as the mayor of Consolacion from 2019 to 2022 along with former vice mayor, and now mayor Teresa Alegado. Alegado also previously served as a councilor of Consolacion.
