= Valdemar Chiong =

Filipino politician

The Honorable Valdemar Chiong

Mayor of Naga
- Incumbent
- Assumed office June 30, 2022
- Vice Mayor: Virgilio M. Chiong
- Preceded by: Kristine Vanessa Chiong
- In office June 30, 2019 – March 16, 2020
- Vice Mayor: Kristine Vanessa Chiong
- Preceded by: Kristine Vanessa Chiong
- Succeeded by: Kristine Vanessa Chiong
- In office 2006 – June 30, 2016
- Preceded by: Ferdinand Chiong
- Succeeded by: Kristine Vanessa Chiong

Personal details
- Born: Valdemar Mendiola Chiong; September 5, 1960 (age 65) Cebu City, Cebu, Philippines
- Party: Nacionalista (2008–present)
- Other party: KAMPI (until 2008)

Valdemar "Val" Mendiola Chiong (born September 5, 1960) is a Filipino politician who is the incumbent mayor of Naga, Cebu, Philippines. He previously held the position twice, first from 2006 to 2016 when he assumed the position after the death of his brother and then mayor Ferdinand Chiong and went on to serve for three consecutive terms, and from June 30, 2019, to March 16, 2020.

On August 14, 2019, the Sandiganbayan ordered a 90-day suspension for Chiong on graft charges filed against him. He started serving his suspension on September 2, 2019.

More than two months upon his return from suspension, he announced his resignation as mayor of Naga effective on March 16, 2020, in a letter to Cebu Governor Gwendolyn Garcia on February 24, 2020. His then-vice mayor at the time Kristine Vanessa Chiong, his daughter who also served as mayor from 2016 to 2019, succeeded him.
