= Gwendolyn Garcia =

Filipina politician (born 1955)

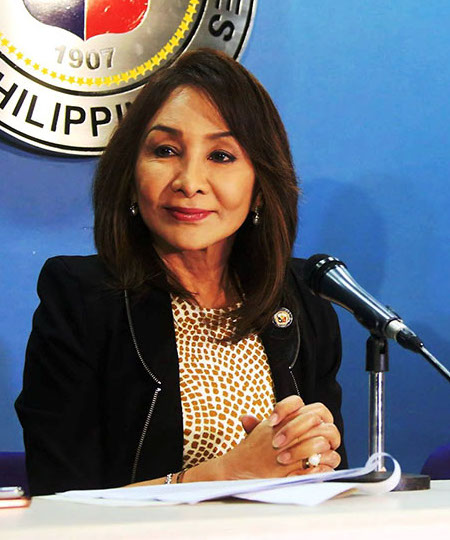
- Garcia in 2018, addressing a press briefing of the House of Representatives

25th and 27th Governor of Cebu
- In office June 30, 2019 – June 30, 2025
- Vice Governor: Hilario Davide III
- Preceded by: Hilario Davide III
- Succeeded by: Pam Baricuatro
- In office June 30, 2004 – June 30, 2013; Suspended: December 19, 2012 – June 19, 2013
- Vice Governor: Gregorio G. Sanchez Jr. (2004–2011); Agnes Magpale (2011–2013)
- Preceded by: Pablo P. Garcia
- Succeeded by: Agnes Magpale (acting); Hilario Davide III

Deputy Speaker of the House of Representatives of the Philippines
- In office August 15, 2016 – August 15, 2018
- House Speaker: Pantaleon Alvarez (2016–2018); Gloria Macapagal Arroyo (2018)

Member of the Philippine House of Representatives from Cebu's 3rd district
- In office June 30, 2013 – June 30, 2019
- Preceded by: Pablo John Garcia
- Succeeded by: Pablo John Garcia

Personal details
- Born: Gwendolyn Fiel Garcia; October 12, 1955 (age 70) Cebu City, Cebu, Philippines
- Party: 1CEBU (2007–present)
- Other political affiliations: KAMPI (2007); UNA (2012–2016); NUP (2011–2012); Lakas (2004–2011); PDP–Laban (2016–2024)
- Spouse(s): Eufrocino Codilla, Jr.
- Children: 3, including Christina
- Parent: Pablo P. Garcia (father)
- Relatives: Garcia family (including siblings Winston and Pablo John); Duke Frasco (son-in-law)
- Education: University of the Philippines Diliman (BA, LL.B)
- Profession: Politician, businesswoman

Gwendolyn Fiel Garcia-Codilla (born October 12, 1955) is a Filipino politician who formerly served as the 27th governor of Cebu from 2019 to 2025. She held the position from 2004 to 2013 and served as the representative for Cebu's third district from 2013 to 2019, during which she served as a house deputy speaker from 2016 to 2018

== Early life and education ==
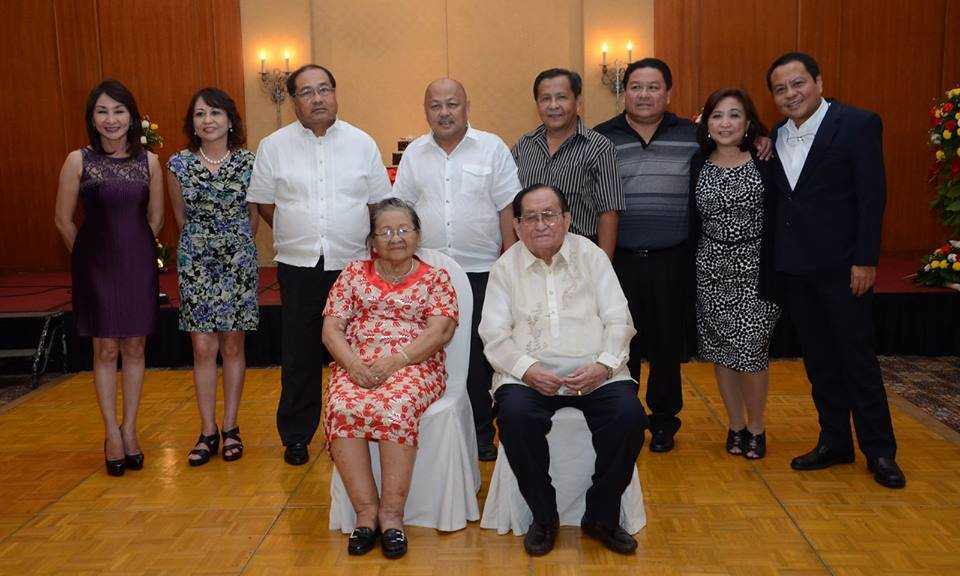
Gov. Gwen Garcia (leftmost, second row) with her family

Garcia was born on October 12, 1955. She is the eldest daughter of former Cebu Governor and House Deputy Speaker Pablo P. Garcia and Judge Esperanza "Inday" Fiel García. Her youngest brother, Pablo John Garcia, is a lawyer-congressman. Another brother, Byron Garcia, has been a security consultant for the Cebu Provincial Detention and Rehabilitation Center (CPDRC), which caught global attention in 2007 for its rendition of Michael Jackson's "Thriller" featuring its inmates. Another brother, Winston Garcia, is the former general manager of the Government Service Insurance System. Another brother, Marlon Garcia, served as the mayor of the Barili, Cebu, from 2016 to his death on September 6, 2020.

Garcia studied at St. Theresa's College in Cebu. She earned her Bachelor of Arts degree in Broadcast Communication from the University of the Philippines Diliman and studied law at the same university. She was awarded with the honorary degrees of Doctor of Humanities from Cebu Normal University (CNU) and Doctor of Philosophy in Technology Management from Cebu State College of Science and Technology (CSCST).

== Private career ==
Prior to being elected as governor, she was responsible for instituting various reforms at the Cebu Provincial Capitol as a Consultant on Systems Promotion and Development for three years. Earlier, she was Consultant on Financial Affairs and assisted her father in expanding the province's resources.

She was active in the private sector as chairperson of the Leyte Cooperative Bank from 1996 to 1998. She is, since 1998, the president and CEO of the GGC Group, Inc.

She is the head of the Regional Development Council, the Regional Peace and Order Council, and chairman of the Visayas RDCom (comprising RDC 6, RDC 7 and RDC 8), the Deputy Secretary General for Visayas of the League of Provinces of the Philippines (LPP), chairman of the board of the Mactan Cebu Bridge Management Board (MCBMB), and member of the board of the Mactan Cebu International Airport Authority (MCIAA).

== Governor of Cebu (2004–2013) ==
Garcia first entered politics in 2004, when she was elected as governor by 7,000 votes to succeed her father. Three years later, in 2007, she was reelected overwhelmingly, obtaining a lead of 500,000 votes. In 2010, she defeated Hilario Davide III, son of former Chief Justice Hilario Davide, Jr., for a third and final term by almost 100,000 votes.

On December 19, 2012, Garcia was suspended by the office of the President for six months for usurping the appointing power of the office of the vice governor. This means she took control over appointments that should have been made by then vice governor Gregorio Sanchez, specifically by making significant cuts to the budget of the Vice Governor's Office without proper permission. The investigation also found that Garcia committed "grave abuse of authority" by hiring consultants without getting approval from the provincial legislative council, the Sangguniang Panlalawigan. Vice-Governor Agnes Magpale was sworn immediately into office as acting governor. Despite this, Garcia said she remains to be the governor. She dared police on December 20, 2012, to forcibly remove her from the governor's office where she had holed up, saying her removal could only happen "over my dead body."

== House of Representatives of the Philippines (2013–2019) ==
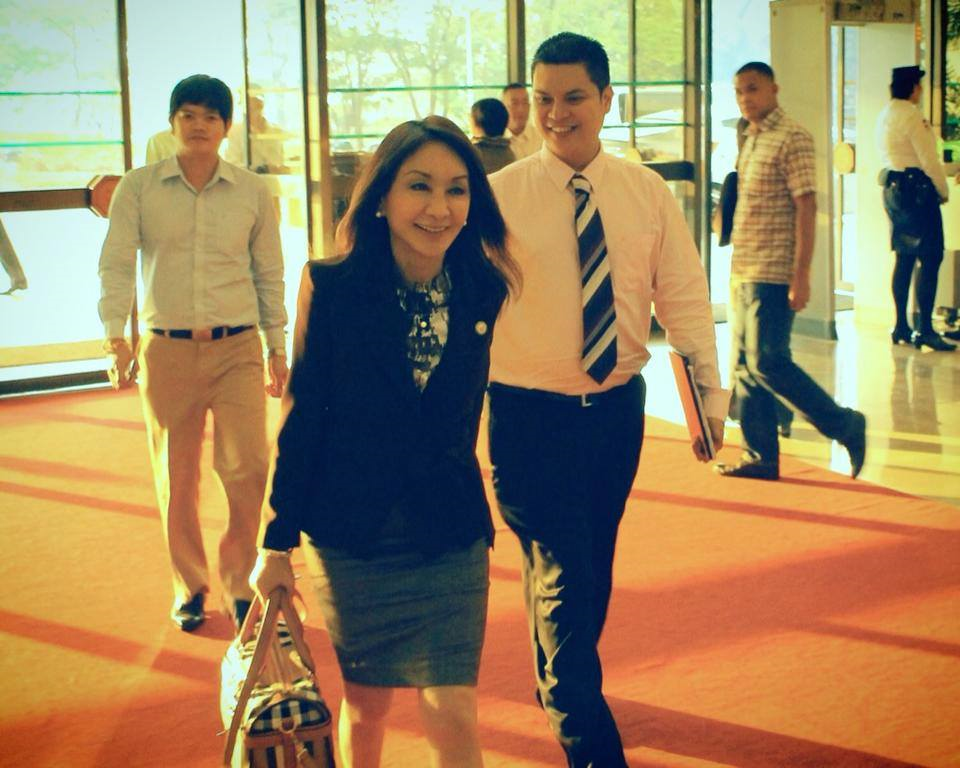
Rep. Garcia arriving at the Batasang Pambansa as a member of the House of Representatives

From December 2012 to June 2013, Garcia was preventively suspended by the Office of the President pending an investigation into a complaint of "grave abuse of authority" filed by Vice Governor Gregorio Sanchez.

Garcia was elected as the representative of the third congressional district in 2013, over Pinamungahan Mayor Geraldine Yapha. She was re-elected in 2016.

=== Graft charges ===
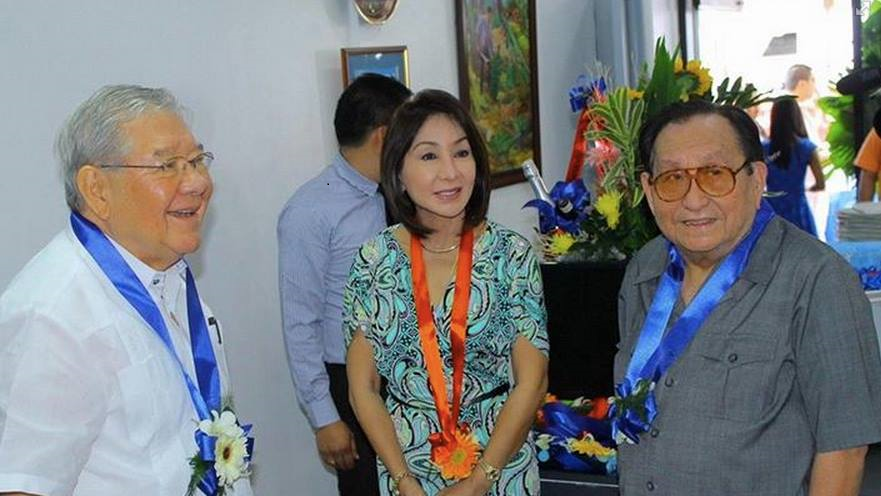
Rep. Garcia with House of Representatives Speaker Feliciano Belmonte (left) and her father, former Representative Pablo P. Garcia (right)

In 2016, Garcia faced 11 counts of graft for the anomalous construction of the Cebu International Convention Center (CICC) in 2006. The Ombudsman dismissed criminal charges on Garcia in December 2020.

In 2018, the Sandiganbayan heard a criminal case against then-Representative Garcia and other officials on the acquisition of the Barili property in Naga, Cebu in 2008. In 2020, the anti-graft court dismissed the charges against Garcia and seven others.

In 2018, Ombudsman Conchita Carpio-Morales ordered her dismissal from service for grave misconduct in connection with the purchase of a ₱98.9-million property in Balili, Naga, Cebu. More than half of the property was discovered to be underwater and was partly in a mangrove area. In 2012, Garcia tapped Supreme ABF Construction to supply backfilling materials for the submerged portion of the land for ₱24.47 million. The Ombudsman however found that Garcia had no authority from the Sangguniang Panlalawigan when she entered into the contract with the firm. However, on April 23, 2014, the Court of Appeals (CA) Special 18th Division in Cebu City cleared Garcia of grave misconduct over the same case.

The dismissal from service was reversed by the Court of Appeals (CA) in 2019. The decision of the CA Special Division of Five was promulgated on May 10, 2019, three days before election day. If was signed by five associate justices but with two dissenting. The CA's reversal of CA allowed Garcia to run as Governor of Cebu which she won against Agnes Magpale.

== Governor of Cebu (2019–2025) ==
=== Elections ===
During the 2019 Cebu local elections, Garcia ran for governor of Cebu as a candidate of the PDP–Laban / One Cebu Party coalition and won against NPC candidate Agnes Magpale. Her brother Pablo John Garcia won the seat she vacated – the third congressional district of Cebu of the House of Representatives. She was re-elected in 2022, but lost reelection in 2025 to Pam Baricuatro, marking her first electoral defeat in her political career.

=== Tenure ===
==== COVID-19 pandemic: public shaming and promotion of alternative medicine ====
On May 18, 2020, Garcia held a briefing with the local press where she usually goes over the latest COVID-19 updates in the province. This briefing was also aired on Facebook Live. During the press conference, she pulled out large sheets of paper with Facebook comments printed on them, while having the posts broadcast on half the screen through Sugbo News, the province's public information office. Garcia began to publicly shame a netizen in retaliation for Facebook comments criticizing and insulting her and her provincial government. This action was met with criticism and backlash on social media, as well as the Commission on Human Rights (CHR) for publicly exposing and belittling the personal information of said netizen.

In another incident on June 23, 2020, Garcia extensively shamed a doctor who had criticized the local mandate of relying on tuob (steam inhalation) to treat possible symptoms of novel coronavirus disease 2019 (COVID-19). Garcia questioned the doctor's qualifications and undermined her years of experience, even telling her to run for office if she was confident about her medical knowledge. This event was once again met with tremendous backlash online, especially from those within the medical community.

==== Probe into Garcia brothers' deaths ====
Governor Gwen Garcia, with Congressman Pablo Garcia, launched an inquiry to ascertain the death of her brothers: former Barili Mayor Nelson Garcia and Dumanjug Mayor Marlon Garcia. Rep. Garcia said their brothers tested positive for COVID-19 "but they recovered and what happened after was the cause of their deaths." Governor said that based on the death certificate, Nelson Garcia died due to "immediate cardio pulmonary arrest secondary to probable massive embolism". For Marlon Garcia, the cause of death was "septic shock secondary to catheter related blood stream infection, ventilator associated pneumonia."

==== HSBC 1996 loan dispute ====
In September 2024, the Supreme Court of the Philippines released a December 4, 2023 ruling on a 1996 loan litigation stating that Garcia should pay Hongkong and Shanghai Banking Corporation $700,000 with 12% legal interest from July 2000, and P404,560.50 in legal costs.

==== 2025 suspension ====
On March 20, 2024, Mayor Michael Rama, her fellow PDP–Laban member, filed an administrative complaint before the Office of President and sought the suspension of Garcia regarding the Cebu Bus Rapid Transit System. Garcia issued a memorandum to stop the CBRT construction in heritage buffer zones of the Cebu Provincial Capitol and Fuente Osmeña Circle on February 27, 2024. Garcia eventually resigned as a member of PDP on May 28, 2024. On April 28, 2025, the Ombudsman imposed a six-month suspension on Garcia for issuing a construction permit to a private firm without securing clearance from the Department of Environment and Natural Resources. Despite this, Garcia refused to step down.

After leaving office, Garcia was fined P1.2 million in August 2025 by the Ombudsman for illegal dredging operations from a protected nature reserve along the Manganga River in Talisay when she was governor in 2024. This was overturned by the Court of Appeals in March 2026.

== Public profile ==
Garcia is locally dubbed as the "Iron Lady of Cebu" or the "Iron Lady of Southern Philippines" after preserving the territorial integrity of Cebu and putting the province back as the richest province in the country.

== Personal life ==
Gwendolyn Garcia was previously married to Eufrocino Codilla Jr., the son of former Leyte's 4th district representative Eufrocino Codilla Sr. She has three children including Christina Frasco, who has served as the secretary of tourism since 2022.

== Electoral history ==
Electoral history of Gwendolyn Garcia
Year	Office	Party		Votes received				Result
Year	Office	Local	National	Total	%	P.	Swing	Result
2004	Governor of Cebu	—N/a	Lakas–CMD	405,852	39.64%	1st	—N/a	Won
2007	Governor of Cebu	1CEBU	KAMPI	757,356	70.25%	1st	+30.61	Won
2010	Governor of Cebu	1CEBU	Lakas–Kampi	639,587	53.50%	1st	-16.75	Won
2019	Governor of Cebu	1CEBU	PDP–Laban	887,290	58.51%	1st	+5.01	Won
2022	Governor of Cebu	1CEBU	PDP–Laban	1,478,436	80.80%	1st	+22.29	Won
2025	Governor of Cebu	1CEBU	—N/a	765,051	40.13%	2nd	-40.67	Lost
2013	Representative (Cebu–3rd)	1CEBU	UNA	94,305	42.71%	1st	—N/a	Won
2016	Representative (Cebu–3rd)	1CEBU	UNA	139,923	62.20%	1st	+19.49	Won
