= Aloguinsan =

Municipality in Cebu, Philippines

- Municipality
- Municipality of Aloguinsan
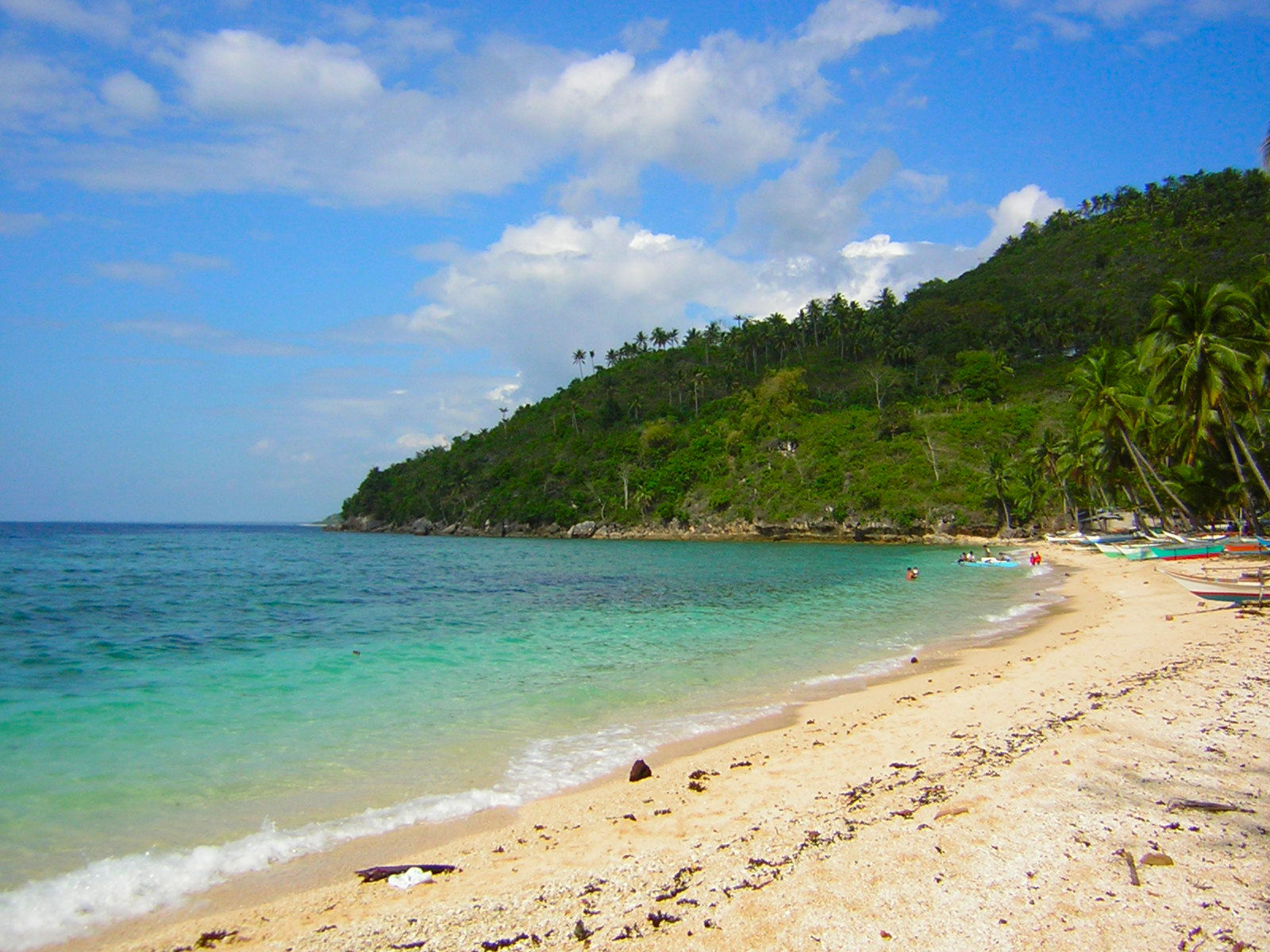
- Cantabugon, Aloguinsan

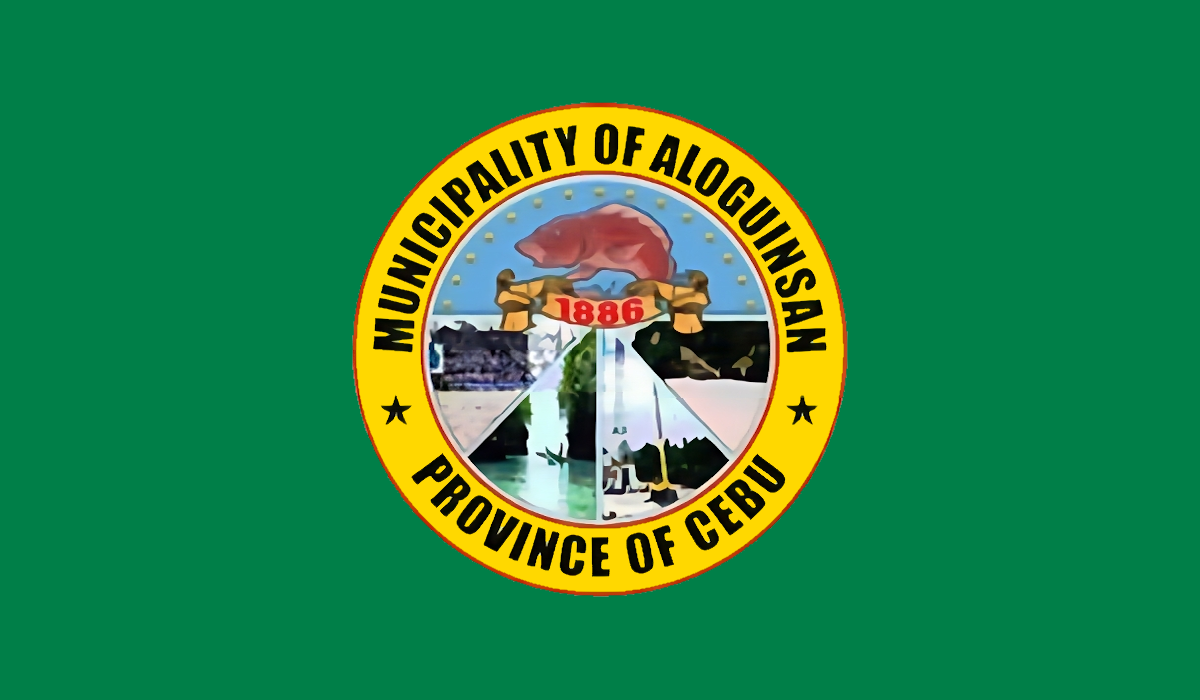
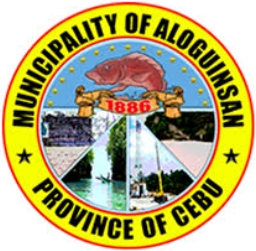
- Flag Seal
- Anthem: Aloguinsan hymn
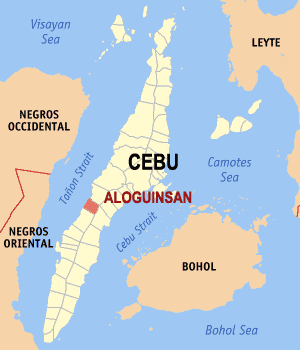
- Map of Cebu with Aloguinsan highlighted
- Interactive map of Aloguinsan
- Location within the Philippines
- Coordinates: 10°13′22″N 123°32′57″E
- Country: Philippines
- Region: Central Visayas
- Province: Cebu
- District: 3rd district
- Founded: 1886
- Barangays: 15 (see Barangays)

Government
  - Type: Sangguniang Bayan
  - Mayor: Cesare Ignatius G. Moreno (1Cebu)
  - Vice Mayor: Raisa G. Moreno (1Cebu)
  - Representative: Pablo John F. Garcia
  - Municipal Council: Members: Ronald D. Paras; Christian G. Moreno; Mariolito R. Biton; Rogelio D. Dealagdon; Porferio S. Nudnud; Michael E. Pabroa; Susan G. Laña; Josephine T. Concon
  - Electorate: 21,021 voters (2025)

Area
  - Total: 61.92 km^{2} (23.91 sq mi)
- Elevation: 36 m (118 ft)

Population (2024 census)
  - Total: 34,990
  - Density: 565.1/km^{2} (1,464/sq mi)
  - Households: 7,763

Economy
  - Income class: 3rd municipal income class
  - Poverty incidence: 2% (2025)
  - Revenue: ₱ 156.4 million (2024)
  - Assets: ₱ 201.5 million (2024)
  - Expenditure: ₱ 246.8 million (2024)
  - Liabilities: ₱ 205.6 million (2024)

Service provider
  - Electricity: Cebu 3 Electric Cooperative (CEBECO 3)
- Time zone: UTC+8 (PST)
- ZIP code: 6040
- PSGC: 072204000
- IDD : area code: +63 (0)32
- Native languages: Cebuano; Tagalog

Aloguinsan, officially the Municipality of Aloguinsan (Cebuano: Lungsod sa Aloguinsan; Tagalog: Bayan ng Aloguinsan), is a municipality in the province of Cebu, Philippines. According to the 2024 census, it has a population of 34,990 people.

== History ==
Aloguinsan was formerly a barrio of Pinamungajan. It was created a town by the Royal Decree of the Kingdom of Spain in 1886.

Bulwarte, a historic landmark, still stands as mute testimony to the courage of the early inhabitants of Aloguinsan. Because of the frequent Moro attacks, the natives, under the supervision of the Spaniards, constructed a watchtower on top of a hill at the mouth of a river. From this vantage point, they could see incoming Moro vintas.

One night (a full moon and favorable winds), the Muslim invaders approached the village. With old people, women, and children safe behind the hills, the men began firing their cannons and did not stop until the pirates had been annihilated. It was the end of Moro assaults.

The historic hill of Villona between the barrios of Olango and Cawasan was also the site of a battle between the American forces and Filipino revolutionaries. The rebels under the leadership of Anastacio de la Cruz encountered the forces of Lt. Walker on Holy Thursday, April 1903. Lt. Walker and a number of his men were killed. The following day, Good Friday, Lt. McCoy took over the command of the American troops and outfought the Pulahanes (the rebels were so called because of their red headbands) who were defeated.

The courage and patriotism of the Aloguinsan were again tested in World War II. Cebuano guerillas resisted Japanese invaders, and joined Allied and Filipino troops of the 3rd, 8th, 82nd and 83rd Infantry Division of the Philippine Commonwealth Army.

== Geography ==
Aloguinsan is bordered to the north by the town of Pinamungajan, to the west is the Tañon Strait, to the east is the city of Carcar, and to the south is the town of Barili. It is 90 kilometres (56 mi) southwest of Cebu City.

=== Barangays ===
Aloguinsan is politically subdivided into 15 barangays. Each barangay consists of puroks and some have sitios.

PSGC	Barangay	Population			±% p.a.	
		2024		2010		
072204001	Angilan	7.5%	2,634	1,926	▴	2.19%
072204002	Bojo	5.3%	1,869	1,603	▴	1.07%
072204003	Bonbon	22.3%	7,807	6,611	▴	1.16%
072204004	Esperanza	5.3%	1,866	1,759	▴	0.41%
072204005	Kandingan	2.7%	937	848	▴	0.69%
072204006	Kantabogon	4.8%	1,697	1,526	▴	0.74%
072204007	Kawasan	6.4%	2,239	1,975	▴	0.87%
072204008	Olango	3.3%	1,151	1,026	▴	0.80%
072204009	Poblacion	9.7%	3,392	2,747	▴	1.47%
072204010	Punay	4.4%	1,544	1,531	▴	0.06%
072204011	Rosario	5.3%	1,868	1,864	▴	0.01%
072204012	Saksak	3.3%	1,157	1,139	▴	0.11%
072204013	Tampa‑an	5.8%	2,021	1,513	▴	2.03%
072204014	Toyokon	2.0%	693	680	▴	0.13%
072204015	Zaragosa	3.5%	1,225	902	▴	2.15%
	Total		34,990	27,650	▴	1.65%

=== Climate ===
Climate data for Aloguinsan, Cebu
Month	Jan	Feb	Mar	Apr	May	Jun	Jul	Aug	Sep	Oct	Nov	Dec	Year
Mean daily maximum °C (°F)	28 (82)	29 (84)	30 (86)	31 (88)	31 (88)	30 (86)	30 (86)	30 (86)	30 (86)	29 (84)	29 (84)	28 (82)	30 (85)
Mean daily minimum °C (°F)	23 (73)	23 (73)	23 (73)	24 (75)	25 (77)	25 (77)	25 (77)	25 (77)	25 (77)	25 (77)	24 (75)	23 (73)	24 (75)
Average precipitation mm (inches)	70 (2.8)	49 (1.9)	62 (2.4)	78 (3.1)	138 (5.4)	201 (7.9)	192 (7.6)	185 (7.3)	192 (7.6)	205 (8.1)	156 (6.1)	111 (4.4)	1,639 (64.6)
Average rainy days	13.4	10.6	13.1	14.5	24.2	27.9	28.4	27.7	27.1	27.4	22.5	15.9	252.7
Source: Meteoblue (Use with caution: this is modeled/calculated data, not measured locally.)

== Demographics ==
Population census of Aloguinsan
Year	Pop.	±% p.a.
1903	14,013	—
1918	14,020	+0.00%
1939	13,040	−0.34%
1948	12,550	−0.42%
1960	12,115	−0.29%
1970	13,192	+0.85%
1975	13,712	+0.78%
1980	15,775	+2.84%
1990	19,214	+1.99%
1995	21,472	+2.10%
2000	24,180	+2.58%
2007	26,353	+1.19%
2010	27,650	+1.76%
2015	32,100	+2.88%
2020	34,466	+1.51%
2024	34,990	+0.36%
Source: Philippine Statistics Authority

== Economy ==
Poverty incidence of Aloguinsan (%)

Source: Philippine Statistics Authority

== Festival ==
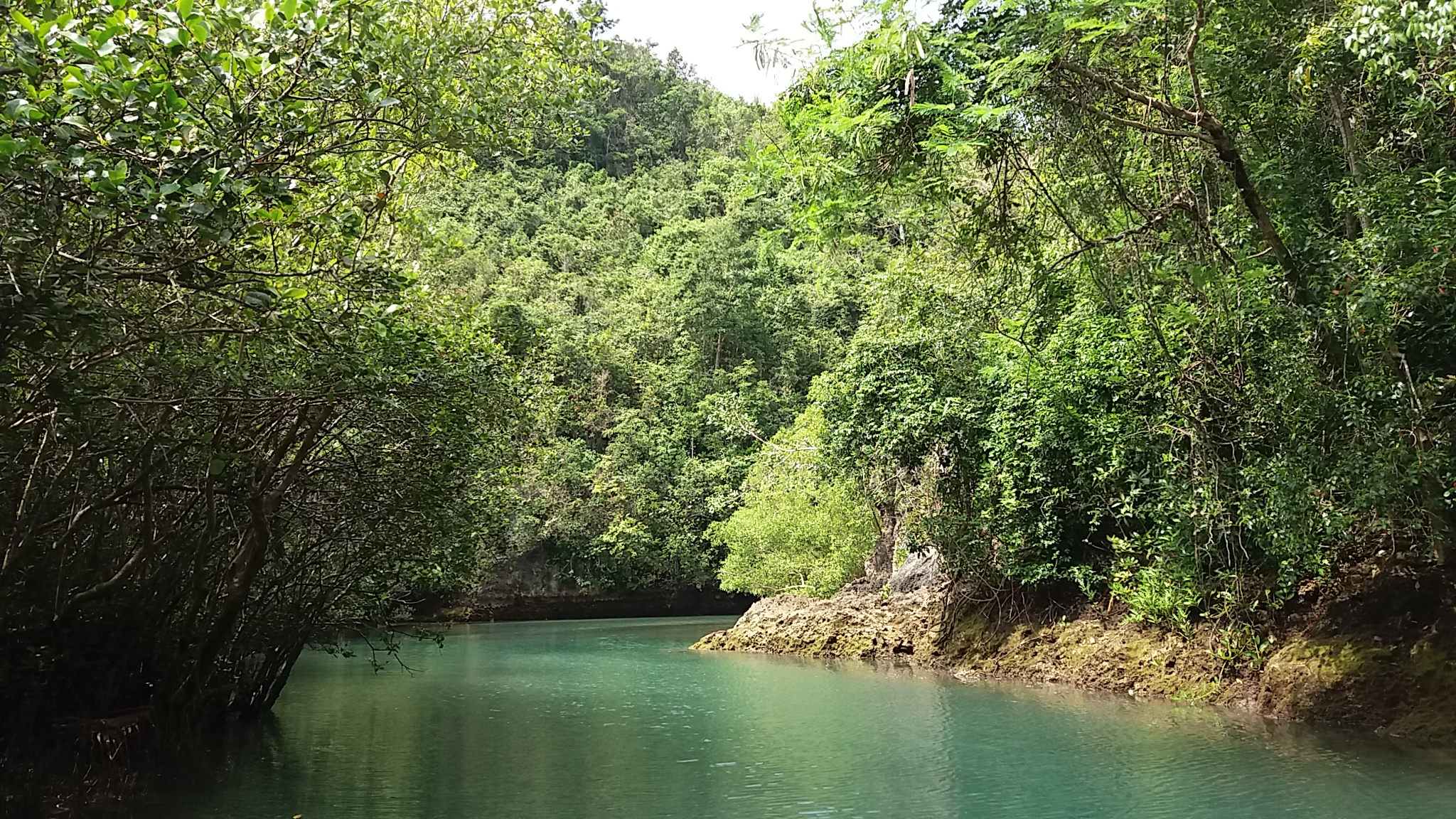
Bojo River

Every June, they celebrate the famous "Kinsan Festival", named after the Dotted Grouper (Epinephelus epistictus), known locally as Kinsan, that is usually abundant in months of May to July. The town fiesta is celebrated every 2nd Sunday of June in honor of St. Raphael the Archangel. Interestingly, the saint is sometimes depicted in religious iconography as holding a fish.

Only Aloguinsan has a titular parish dedicated to Saint Raphael the Archangel throughout the entire Archdiocese of Cebu.

== Tourism ==
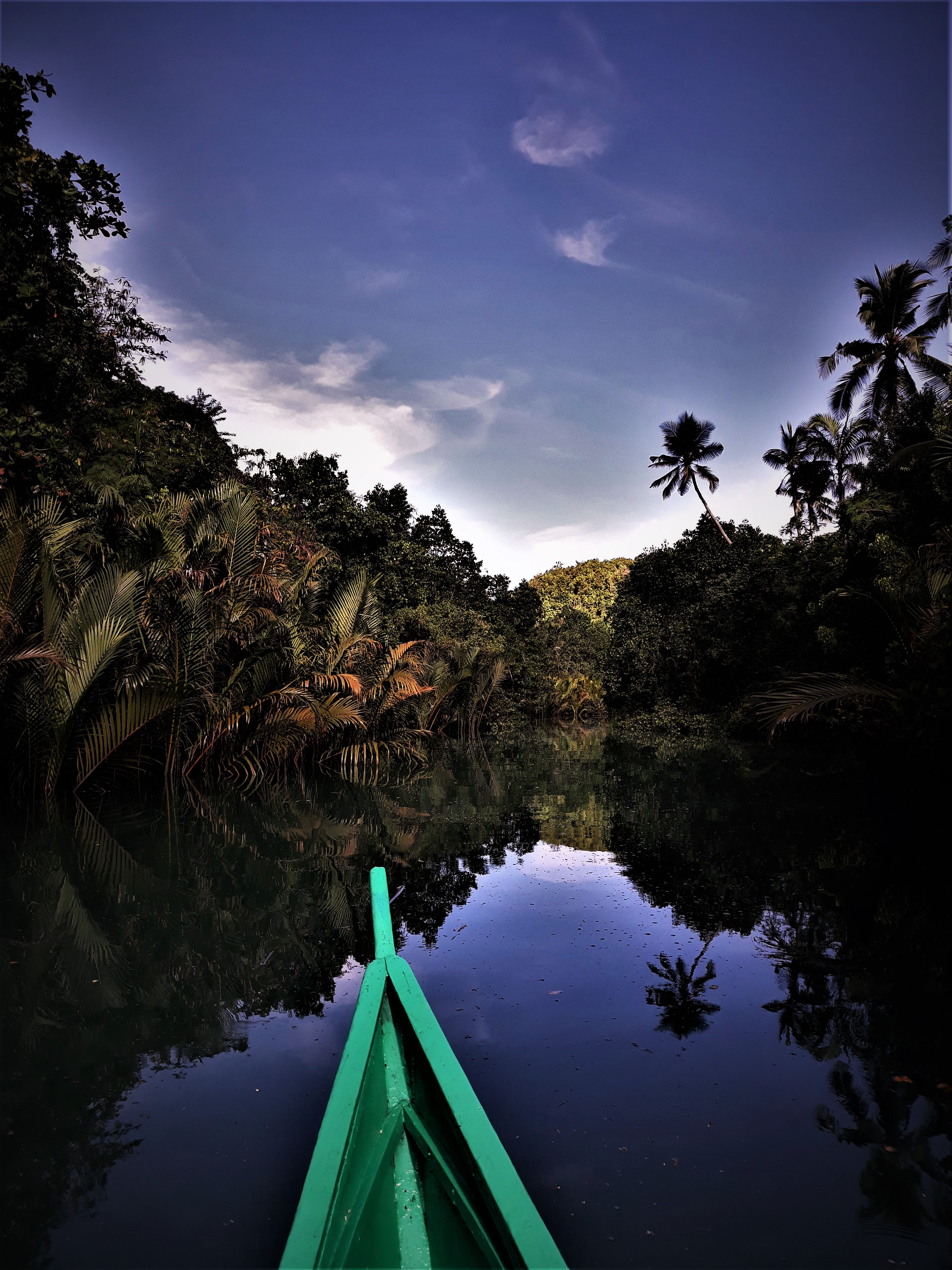
Bojo River, Cebu

- Bojo River
- Hermit's Cove
- Hidden Beach

== Education ==
The public schools in the town of Aloguinsan are administered by one school district under the Schools Division of Cebu Province.

Elementary schools:

- Aloguinsan Central Elementary School — Poblacion
- Angilan Elementary School — Angilan
- Bogo Elementary School — Sitio Bogo, Kawasan
- Bojo Elementary School — Bojo
- Calape Primary School — Sitio Calape, Kawasan
- Cawasan Elementary School — Cawasan
- Kandingan Elementary School — Kandingan
- Kantabogon Elementary School — Kantabogon
- Olango Elementary School — Olango
- Punay Elementary School — Punay
- Saksak Elementary School — Saksak
- Sto. Rosario Elementary School — Rosario
- Zaragosa Elementary School — Zaragosa

High schools:

- Aloguinsan National High School — Poblacion
- Angilan National High School — Angilan
- Rosario National High School — Rosario

Integrated schools:

- Bonbon Integrated School — Bonbon
- Esperanza Integrated School — Esperanza
- Tampaan Integrated School — Tampa-an
- Tuyokon Integrated School — Toyokon

== Notable personalities ==
- Jojo Tangkay - A professional basketball player notably played in PBL then PBA's Welcoat Dragons.

== Sources ==
- Lipsius, Terrie (2011). My Awe-Inspiring Journey. Trafford. ISBN 978-1466906679.
- Freedom Wall, iAn (9 October 2016). "Bojo River and Hermit's Cove: The Stunner's of Aloguinsan | Freedom Wall". Archived from the original on 11 October 2016.
