= Elanito Peña =

Filipino politician

The Honorable Elanito Peña

Vice Mayor of Minglanilla
- Incumbent
- Assumed office June 30, 2022
- Mayor: Rajiv Enad
- Preceded by: Loben Geonzon
- In office June 30, 2004 – June 30, 2013
- Mayor: Eduardo Selma
- Succeeded by: Robert Selma

Mayor of Minglanilla
- In office June 30, 2013 – June 30, 2022
- Vice Mayor: Loben Geonzon (2019-2022); Robert Selma (2013-2019)
- Preceded by: Eduardo Selma
- Succeeded by: Rajiv Enad

Personal details
- Born: Elanito Alidon Peña; March 23, 1962 (age 64) Cebu City, Cebu, Philippines
- Party: Nacionalista (2008–present)
- Other political affiliations: KAMPI (until 2008)
- Spouse: Ma. Adelita N. Peña

Elanito "Lani" Alidon Peña (born March 23, 1962) is a Filipino politician from Minglanilla, Cebu, Philippines. He currently serves as the vice mayor of Minglanilla since 2022 and served from 2004 to 2013. Peña previously served as mayor along with former vice mayor Robert Selma and Loben Geonzon.
