= Mercedita Apura =

Filipino politician

The Honorable Mercedita Apura
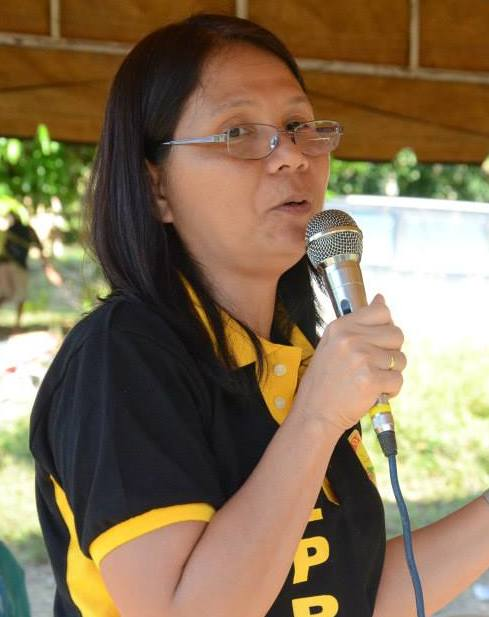

Mayor of Carcar
- In office June 30, 2019 – June 30, 2022
- Vice Mayor: Nicepuro L. Apura
- Preceded by: Nicepuro L. Apura
- Succeeded by: Mario Patricio P. Barcenas

Personal details
- Born: Mercedita Rabanes Apura; October 30, 1962 (age 63) Carcar, Cebu, Philippines
- Party: NPC (2024–present)
- Other political affiliations: Nacionalista (2015–2024)
- Spouse: Nicepuro Apura

Mercedita "Mercy" Rabanes Apura is a Filipino politician from Carcar, Cebu, Philippines. She previously served as the mayor of Carcar. Apura also previously held position as barangay captain of Valladolid, Carcar and as city councilor.
