= Pinamungajan =

Municipality in Cebu, Philippines

Pinamungajan Pinamungahan
- Municipality
- Municipality of Pinamungajan
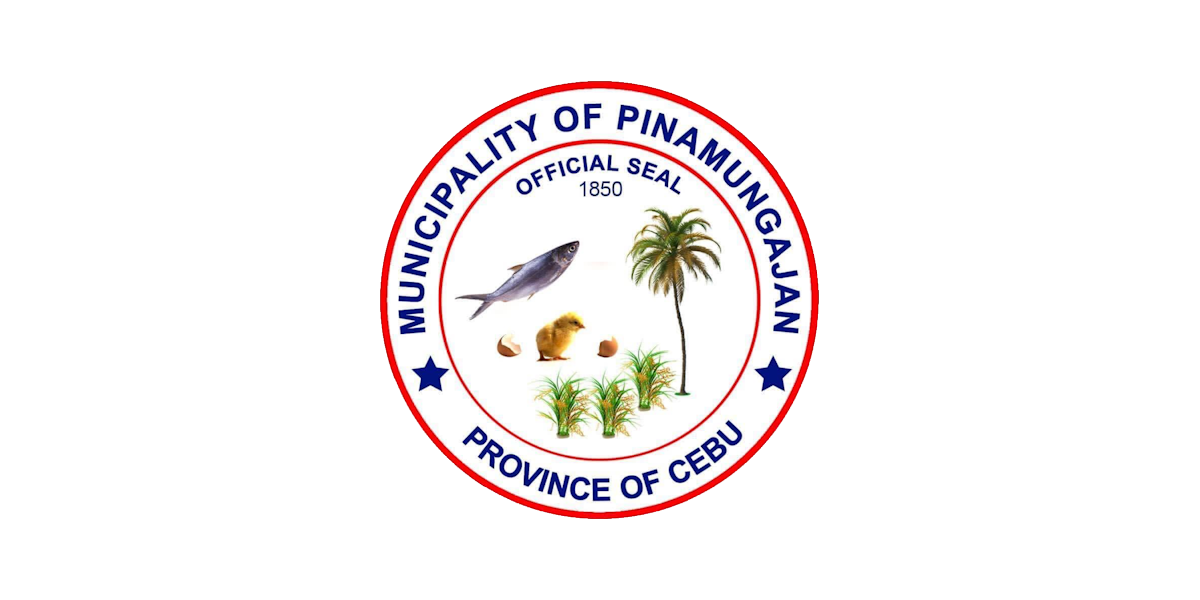
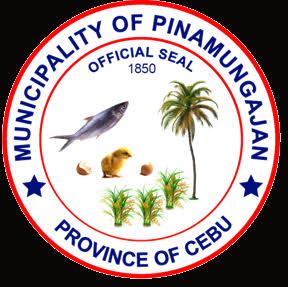
- Flag Seal
- Anthem: Pinamungajan sa kanunay English: Always Pinamungajan
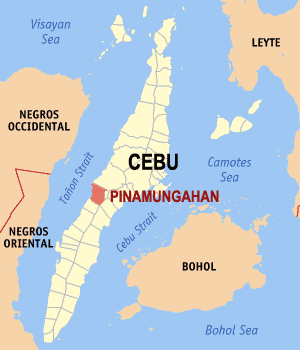
- Map of Cebu with Pinamungajan highlighted
- Interactive map of Pinamungajan
- Location within the Philippines
- Coordinates: 10°16′N 123°35′E
- Country: Philippines
- Region: Central Visayas
- Province: Cebu
- District: 3rd district
- Founded: 1815
- Barangays: 26 (see Barangays)

Government
  - Type: Sangguniang Bayan
  - Mayor: Ana Jessica A. Baricuatro (1Cebu)
  - Vice Mayor: Glenn F. Baricuatro (1Cebu)
  - Representative: Pablo John F. Garcia
  - Municipal Council: Members: Richard M. Canillo; Annette J. Navarro; Maria Honeylette Y. Lingad; Marvin M. Miralles; Marcelo T. Gerongco; Jose A. Alqueza; Maria Elena C. Limocon; Manuelito P. Cerna
  - Electorate: 49,554 voters (2025)

Area
  - Total: 109.16 km^{2} (42.15 sq mi)
- Elevation: 133 m (436 ft)
- Highest elevation: 350 m (1,150 ft)
- Lowest elevation: 0 m (0 ft)

Population (2024 census)
  - Total: 76,568
  - Density: 701.43/km^{2} (1,816.7/sq mi)
  - Households: 16,908

Economy
  - Income class: 1st municipal income class
  - Poverty incidence: 28.44% (2023)
  - Revenue: ₱ 405.5 million (2024)
  - Assets: ₱ 1,192 million (2024)
  - Expenditure: ₱ 191.1 million (2024)
  - Liabilities: ₱ 143.2 million (2024)

Service provider
  - Electricity: Cebu 3 Electric Cooperative (CEBECO 3)
- Time zone: UTC+8 (PST)
- ZIP code: 6039
- PSGC: 072237000
- IDD : area code: +63 (0)32
- Native languages: Cebuano; Tagalog
- Website: pinamungajan.gov.ph

Pinamungajan, officially the Municipality of Pinamungajan (Cebuano: Lungsod sa Pinamungajan; Tagalog: Bayan ng Pinamungajan), is a municipality in the province of Cebu, Philippines. According to the 2024 census, it has a population of 76,568 people.

The town patroness is Saint Monica, mother of one of the fathers and doctors of the Catholic Church, Saint Augustine of Hippo. However, instead of August 27, Pinamungajan celebrates the memorial of the saint on May 4. In 2008, in response to the call of then-governor Gwendolyn Garcia for each Cebu town and city to hold a festival as part of local culture and heritage, Pinamungajan began the Pinamuohan Festival in honor of Saint Monica on her memorial.

== Etymology ==
The municipality, also known as Pinamungahan, was established in the 1815 under the Spanish colonial government in the country. The municipality got its name from the diligent and hardworking people, working hand-in-hand especially during the agricultural harvest season – "Pinamungajan", which originated from the Visayan word pinamuhuan, meant a worker share for his effort during a farm harvest. Over time the Pinamuhuan eventually changed to the current name of the municipality.

== Geography ==
Pinamungajan is bordered to the north by the City of Toledo, to the west is the Tañon Strait, to the east is the city of Naga and the town of San Fernando, and to the south is the town of Aloguinsan. It is 82 kilometres (51 mi) from Cebu City.

=== Barangays ===
Pinamungajan is politically subdivided into 26 barangays. Each barangay consists of puroks and some have sitios.

PSGC	Barangay	Population			±% p.a.	
		2024		2010		
072237001	Anislag	2.1%	1,597	1,434	▴	0.75%
072237002	Anopog	5.0%	3,797	3,116	▴	1.38%
072237003	Binabag	2.8%	2,142	2,032	▴	0.37%
072237004	Buhingtubig	2.3%	1,763	1,691	▴	0.29%
072237005	Busay	1.5%	1,117	1,128	▾	−0.07%
072237006	Butong	2.7%	2,035	1,848	▴	0.67%
072237007	Cabiangon/ Cabinyagan	1.3%	1,000	891	▴	0.80%
072237008	Camugao	2.7%	2,048	2,007	▴	0.14%
072237009	Duangan	1.8%	1,400	1,264	▴	0.71%
072237010	Guimbawian	2.5%	1,894	1,698	▴	0.76%
072237011	Lamac	7.8%	5,953	4,470	▴	2.01%
072237012	Lut‑od	4.1%	3,112	2,213	▴	2.39%
072237013	Mangoto	3.4%	2,602	2,172	▴	1.26%
072237014	Opao	0.7%	503	511	▾	−0.11%
072237015	Pandacan	7.7%	5,890	5,291	▴	0.75%
072237016	Poblacion	8.8%	6,754	5,925	▴	0.91%
072237017	Punod	2.3%	1,781	1,870	▾	−0.34%
072237018	Rizal	3.2%	2,418	2,341	▴	0.22%
072237019	Sacsac	2.0%	1,533	1,415	▴	0.56%
072237020	Sambagon	1.6%	1,233	1,074	▴	0.96%
072237021	Sibago	3.0%	2,261	1,830	▴	1.48%
072237022	Tajao	9.0%	6,915	5,648	▴	1.41%
072237023	Tangub	1.1%	880	1,000	▾	−0.88%
072237024	Tanibag	2.6%	2,002	1,686	▴	1.20%
072237025	Tupas	1.1%	864	817	▴	0.39%
072237026	Tutay	3.2%	2,461	2,625	▾	−0.45%
	Total		76,568	57,997	▴	1.95%

=== Climate ===
Climate data for Pinamungahan, Cebu
Month	Jan	Feb	Mar	Apr	May	Jun	Jul	Aug	Sep	Oct	Nov	Dec	Year
Mean daily maximum °C (°F)	28 (82)	29 (84)	30 (86)	31 (88)	31 (88)	30 (86)	30 (86)	30 (86)	30 (86)	29 (84)	29 (84)	28 (82)	30 (85)
Mean daily minimum °C (°F)	23 (73)	23 (73)	23 (73)	24 (75)	25 (77)	25 (77)	25 (77)	25 (77)	25 (77)	25 (77)	24 (75)	23 (73)	24 (75)
Average precipitation mm (inches)	70 (2.8)	49 (1.9)	62 (2.4)	78 (3.1)	138 (5.4)	201 (7.9)	192 (7.6)	185 (7.3)	192 (7.6)	205 (8.1)	156 (6.1)	111 (4.4)	1,639 (64.6)
Average rainy days	13.4	10.6	13.1	14.5	24.2	27.9	28.4	27.7	27.1	27.4	22.5	15.9	252.7
Source: Meteoblue

== Demographics ==
Population census of Pinamungajan
Year	Pop.	±% p.a.
1903	11,435	—
1918	17,443	+2.86%
1939	22,327	+1.18%
1948	20,364	−1.02%
1960	22,092	+0.68%
1970	26,194	+1.72%
1975	27,075	+0.67%
1980	31,394	+3.00%
1990	40,026	+2.46%
1995	44,009	+1.79%
2000	51,715	+3.52%
2007	54,859	+0.82%
2010	57,997	+2.04%
2015	65,955	+2.48%
2020	75,131	+2.78%
2024	76,568	+0.46%
Source: Philippine Statistics Authority

== Economy ==
Poverty incidence of Pinamungajan (%)

Source: Philippine Statistics Authority

== Tourism ==
- Campolabo Sandbar
- Hidden Valley Wave Pool Resort
- Odlom Falls
- Kamangon Cave
- Sinungkulan Falls

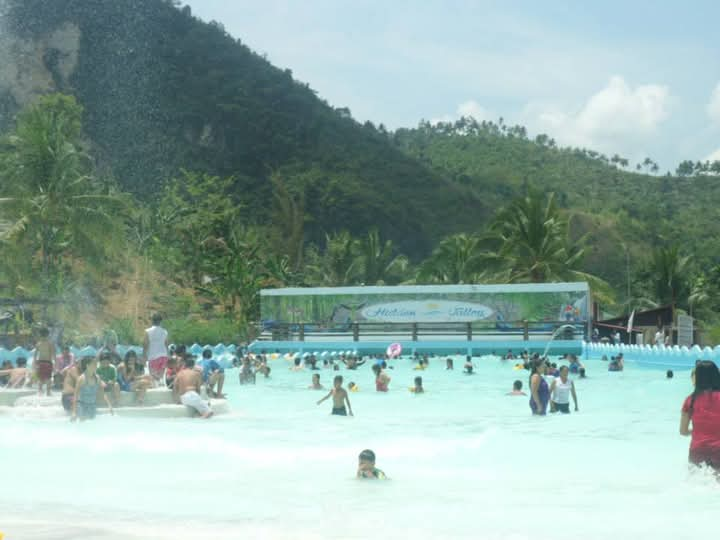
Hidden Valley Wave Pool and Mountain Resort in Lamac, Pinamungajan, Cebu. Managed by Lamac Multi-Purpose Cooperative Inc.

== Notable personalities ==
- June Mar Fajardo - 8-time PBA Most Valuable Player (2014 to 2019, 2023 to 2024)
- Pam Baricuatro - Current Governor of Cebu
