= Algeria (disambiguation) =

Algeria is a country in North Africa.

Algeria or Al-Jazair may also refer to:

- Ottoman Algeria, a former north African state, also known as the Regency of Algiers
- French Algeria, a French colony in modern-day Algeria
- Algeria, West Virginia, an unincorporated community in the United States
- Algeria (musical), a 1908 musical by Victor Herbert and Glen McDonough
- 1213 Algeria, an asteroid
- Algiers, the capital of Algeria
- Algérie, a French treaty cruiser

== See also ==
- Algiers (disambiguation)
- Alger (disambiguation)
- Alegria (disambiguation)
