= Al-Jazāʾir =

Al-Jazāʾir (Arabic: الجزائر, lit. 'the Islands'), more commonly romanized as El-Djazair or (from Algerian Arabic) Dzayer, or similar variants, may refer to:

== Places ==
- Algeria, a country in Northwest Africa
- Algiers, the capital city of Algeria
  - Hotel El-Djazaïr, a hotel in Algiers

== Other uses ==
- El Djazaïr, an Algerian newspaper
- 858 El Djezaïr, a main-belt asteroid
