= Algiers (disambiguation) =

Algiers is the capital of Algeria.

Algiers may also refer to:

- Algiers Province, Algeria

== Algerian history ==
- Kingdom of Tlemcen was occasionally also called the Kingdom of Algiers
- Regency of Algiers, a state in North Africa
- Bombardment of Algiers (disambiguation), multiple bombardments of Algiers throughout history
- Invasion of Algiers in 1830, the event which ended the Regency of Algiers
- Battle of Algiers (1956–1957), a battle between the FLN and France

== Places in the United States ==
- Algiers, Indiana, an unincorporated community
- Algiers, New Orleans, Louisiana, a neighborhood
- Algiers Point, a location on the Mississippi River in New Orleans
- Algiers, Vermont, an unincorporated community

== Other ==
- Algiers (Algiers album), 2015
- Algiers (Calexico album), 2012
- Algiers (band), an American band formed in Atlanta, Georgia
- Algiers (1938 film), an American drama film
- Algiers (2024 film), a mystery thriller film
- Algiers Hotel, a hotel
- El Djazaïr, an Arabic-language newspaper

== See also ==
- Algeria (disambiguation)
- Alger (disambiguation)
- Argiers, a piece of music on Mike Oldfield's 1976 compilation album, Boxed
