= Alegria =

Alegria (Portuguese, Catalan) or Alegría (Spanish) or Allegria (Italian), means joy in English. It also may refer to:

== Places ==
- Alegria, Cebu, a municipality in the Philippines
- Alegria, Rio Grande do Sul, a city in Brazil
- Alegria, Surigao del Norte, a municipality in the Philippines
- Alegría, El Salvador, a municipality in El Salvador
- Alegría-Dulantzi, a municipality in the province of Álava, northern Spain

== Film and shows ==
- Alegría (Cirque du Soleil), a Cirque du Soleil touring show
- Alegría (1999 film), a film adaptation of the Cirque du Soleil show
- Alegría (2021 film), a Spanish film directed by Violeta Salama
- it:Allegria!, Italian quiz show 1999-2001 hosted by Mike Bongiorno

== Music ==
- Alegrías, one of the many palos or subgenres of flamenco music

=== Albums ===
- Alegría (Marcos Witt album), 2006
- Alegría (Wayne Shorter album), 2003
- Allegria, a 1982 album by the Gipsy Kings
- Allegria (1990 album), a 1990 album by the Gipsy Kings

=== Songs ===
- "Alegria, Alegria", a 1967 Português song written and performed by Caetano Veloso
- "Alegría" (Cirque du Soleil song)
- Alegría (Tiago PZK, Anitta and Emilia song)
- "Allegria" (it), 1968 Italian-language song by Mina (Italian singer)
- "Allegria", Italian-language song by Gypsy Kings on the album Allegria

== Other uses ==
- Alegría (surname), a Spanish surname
- L'allegria, 1931 collection of poetry by Ungaretti
- Alegría (Mexican candy), a snack food
- Alegria style, also known as Corporate Memphis, a geometric art style

== See also ==
- Algeria
