= Festivals of Cebu =

Festivals in the Philippines

There are many festivals in the Province of Cebu.

== Sinulog ==
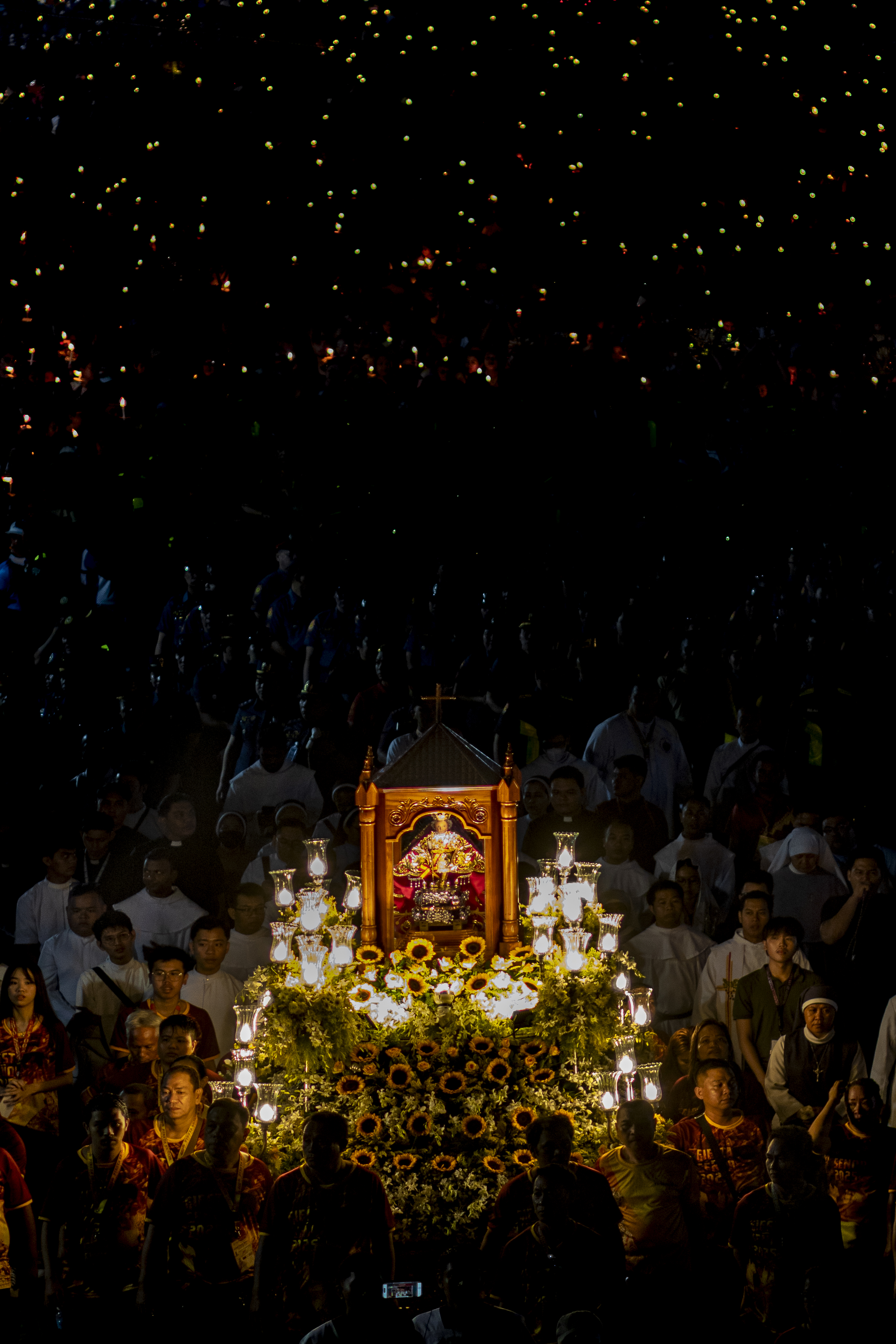
The anticipated Walk with Jesus Procession is the first dawn procession of the Feast of the Child Jesus that officially opens the Fiesta Señor and the Sinulog Activities.

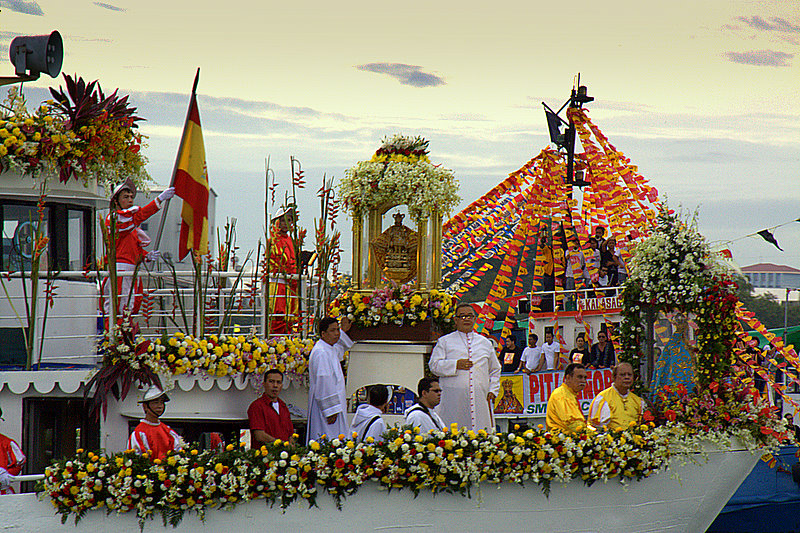
Sinulog's annual maritime procession.

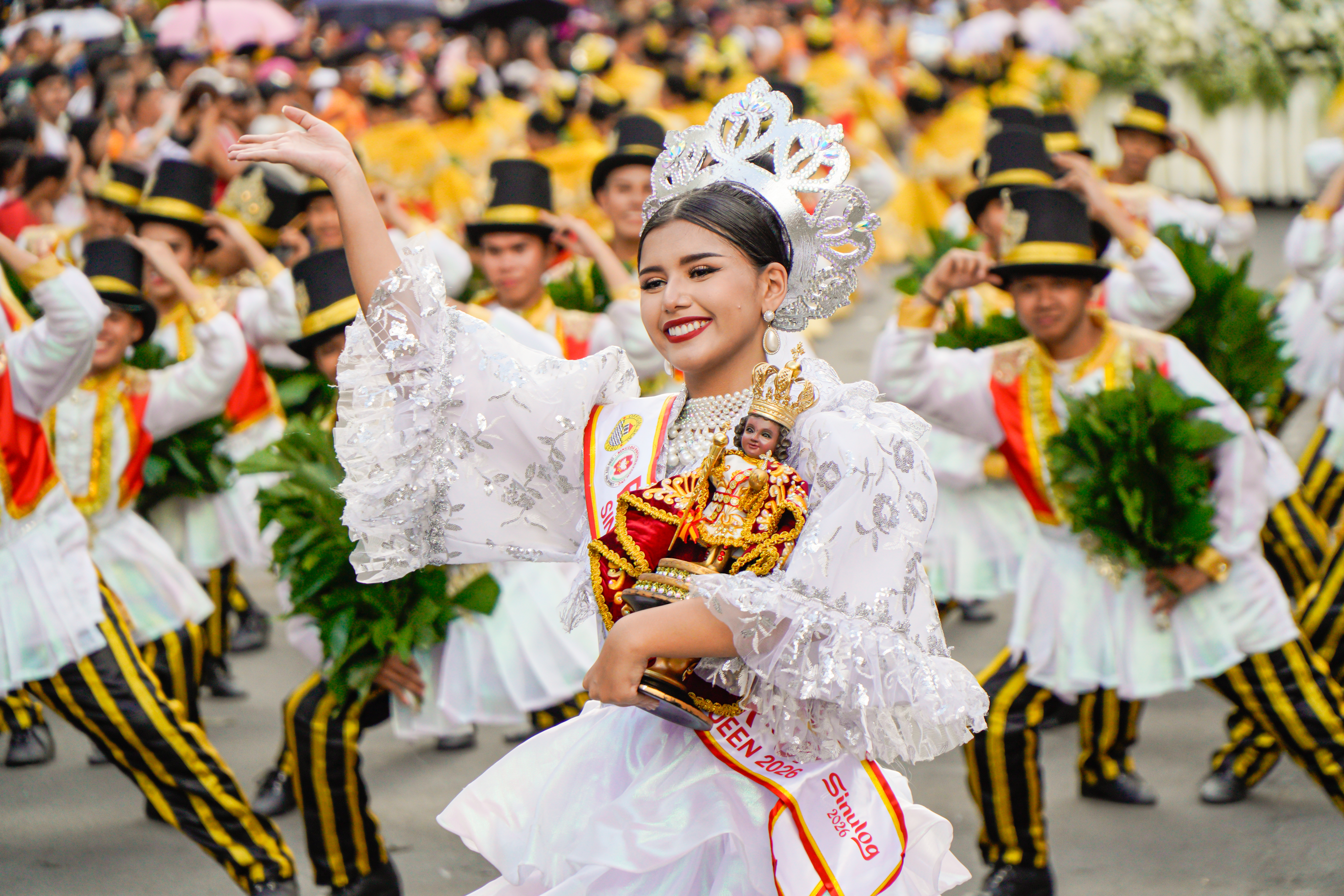
The Sinulog Festival Queen of Carcar City dancing the Sinulog with the Santo Niño. The Carcar City Contingent is a three-time Champion of the Sinulog Festival for the Sinulog-based Category.

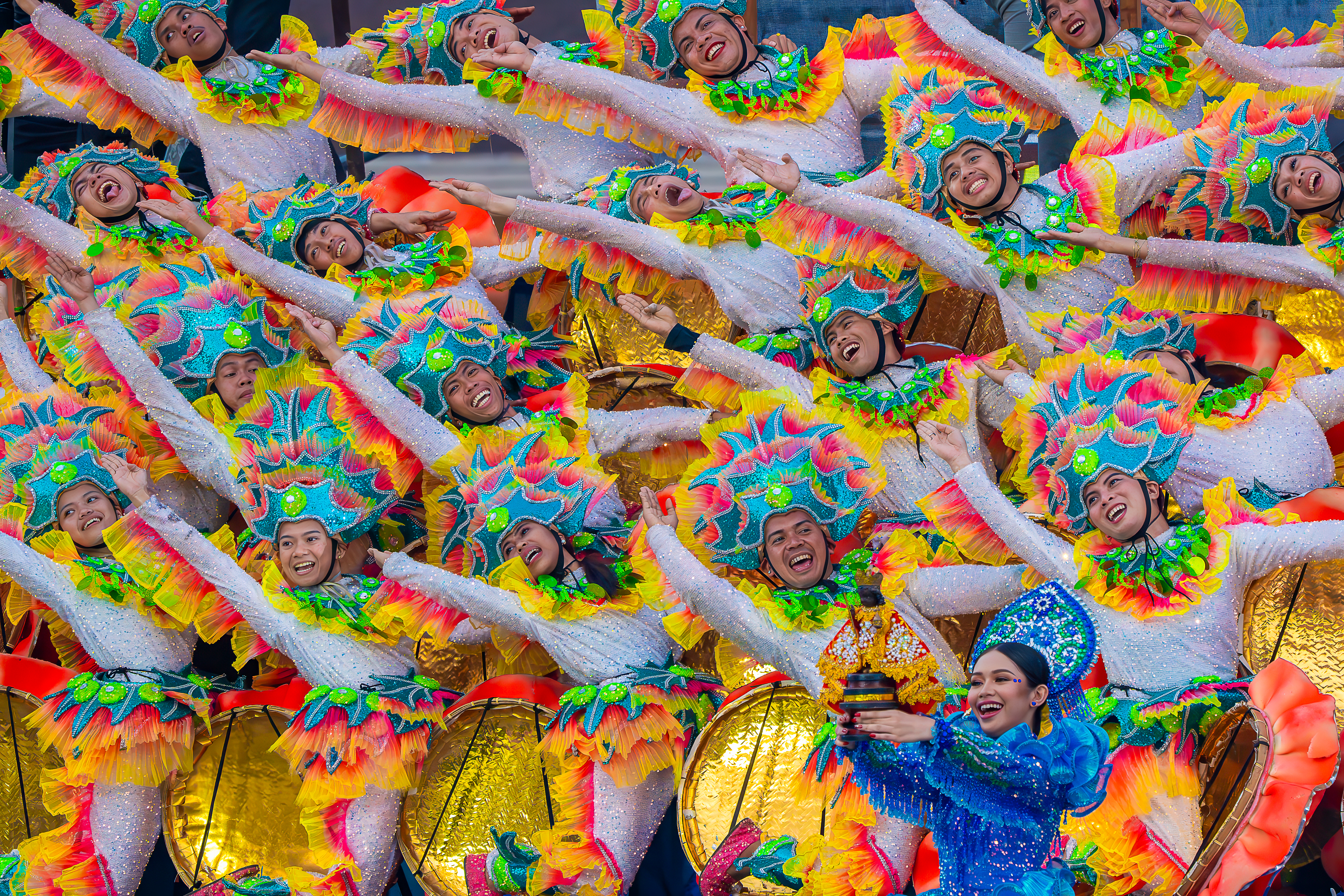
The Sinulog Dancers of Bais City dancing the Grand Parade.

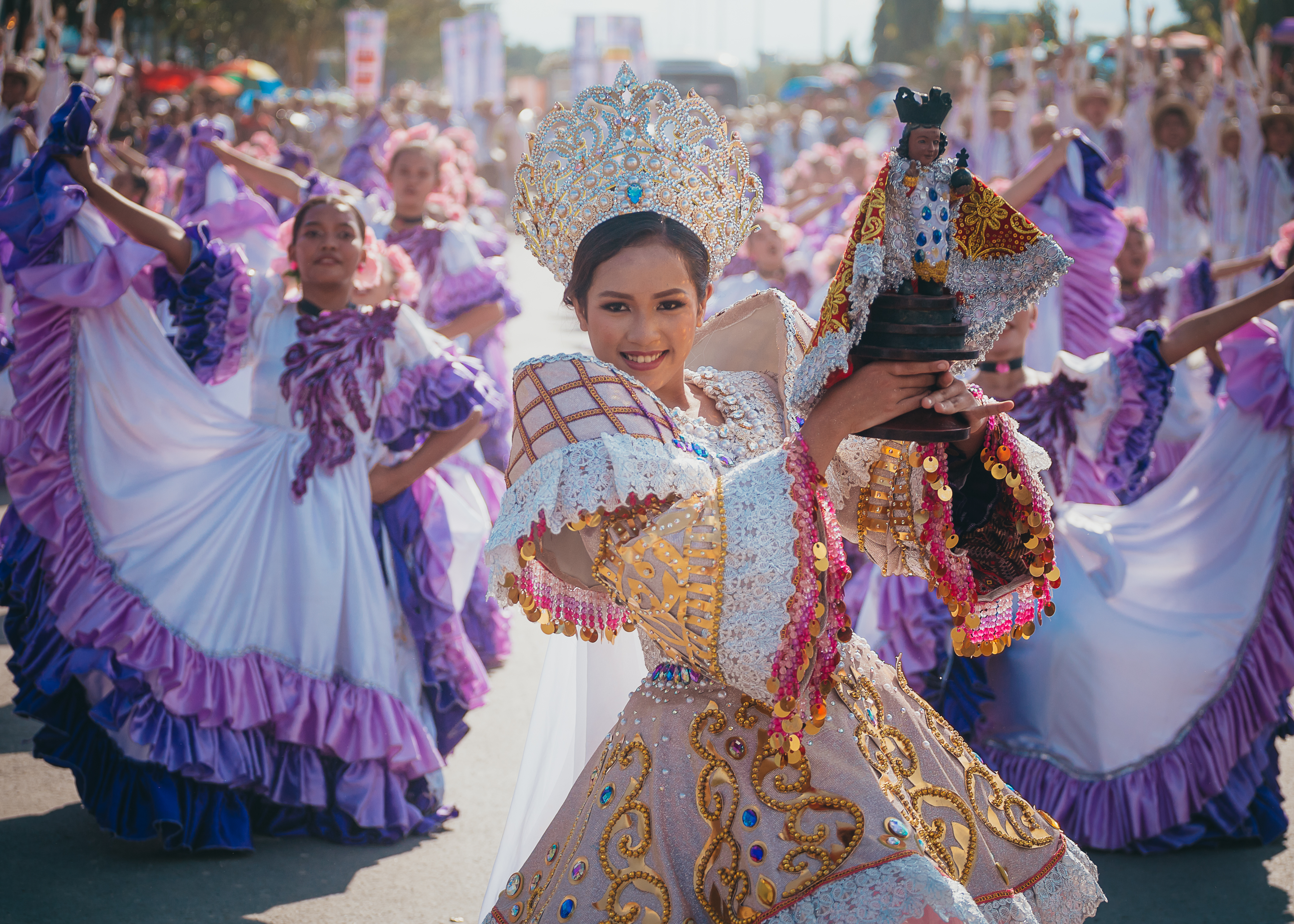
A typical Sinulog Festival Queen with the image of the Child Jesus, locally known as Santo Niño.

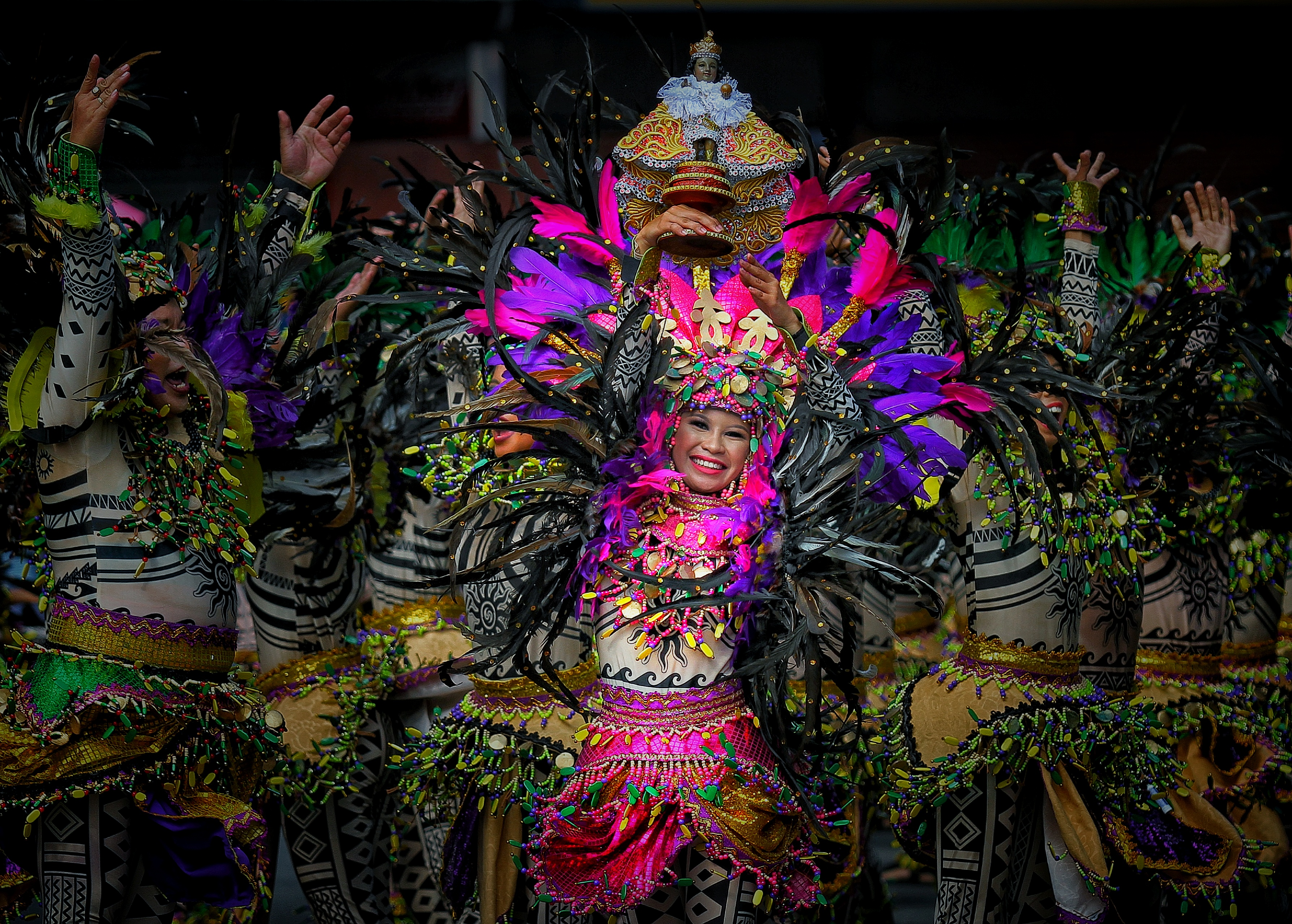
A Sinulog Festival Queen with the Child Jesus, together with her contingent from Toledo City.

The Sinulog Festival is the largest fiesta (festival) in the Philippines. Held every third Sunday of January, it commemorates the Child Jesus (Santo Niño), the Lord and Protector of Cebu. The Sinulog is a dance ritual of pre-Hispanic indigenous origin. The dancer moves two steps forward and one step backward to the rhythmic sound of drums. This movement resembles the current (sulog) of what was then known as Cebu's Pahina River. Thus the name Sinulog.

The Sinulog Festival celebration starts with the Penitential Walk With Jesus lasts for nine days, culminating on the final day with the Sinulog Grand Parade. On the Thursday and Friday before the Fiesta Señor, there is a Penitential Walk With Mary and the Translacion of the Santo Niño and Our Lady of Guadalupe to St. Joseph in his National Shrine in Mandaue City and the National Shrine of Our Lady of the Rule of Opon in Lapu-Lapu City. The day before the parade, the Fluvial Procession is held at dawn with a statue of the Santo Niño, the Virgin Mary, and St. Joseph carried on a pump boat from Lapu-Lapu City to Cebu City, decked with hundreds of flowers and candles. The procession ends at the Basilica Minore del Santo Niño where a re-enactment of the Christianization of the Philippines on the island of Cebu is performed. In the afternoon, a more solemn procession takes place along the major streets of the city, which last for hours due to large crowds participating in the event.

When the Spaniards arrived in Cebu, the Italian chronicler, Antonio Pigafetta, sailing under convoy with the Magellan expedition, offered the wooden figure of the Santo Niño as a baptismal gift to Hara Amihan, wife of Rajah Humabon who was named Juana after her baptism together with the Rajah, who was also renamed, Carlos. Juana, together with the natives, according to tradition, danced and worshipped the Santo Niño de Cebu in their indigenous Sinulog dance ritual. According to legend, the Rajah's adviser, Baladhay, had fallen ill and was bedridden. The Rajah ordered his men to place Baladhay before the image of Santo Niño hoping that the Holy Child would heal him. The next day, the whole Kingdom of Sugbo was awoken to an angry Baladhay who was threatening the Child with a grass knife, appearing to have also fully recovered from his illness. When the Rajah asked him why he was threatening the Child, he told the Rajah that the Child Jesus had mischievously woken him up with a coconut midrib. Irritated by the Child, he grabbed his knife and threatened the Child by swaying the grass knife at the Child, but the Child simply evaded the knife by dancing. Because the Child was so swift at evading the knife, he had no choice but to dance with the Child as well to keep up his pace. He also explained that the Child's dance resembled the river current. Baladhay is believed to be the first person to dance the Sinulog. The Sinulog ritual was preserved after the Spaniards colonized the Philippines, with the focus still on the worship to the Santo Niño. Once the Santo Niño church was built in the 16th century, the Catholic Malay people started performing the Sinulog ritual in front of the church, the devotees offering candles and indigenous dancers shouting "Viva Pit Señor!", which means to "Trust in the Lord".

In the province, the festival is shared by both Cebu City and Carmen. The festival is said to have originated in Carmen and was once a localized version of the Ati-atihan Festival introduced by Jose Motos, the then rector of the Parish of St. Augustine, the town parish of Carmen, but was then changed to "Sinulog sa Carmen" after Sinulog became an established Cebuano festival. The Sinulog dance was first introduced to Cebu City by a woman named Estelita Diola, who would otherwise be referred to as "Titang Diola". Her family was skilled with the original form of the dance of Sinulog and the tradition was eventually passed on to her by her father. Because of her great contribution and propagation of the Sinulog dance of Cebu, she was referred to as the "Heritage Keeper". The original Sinulog dance and her legacy of devotion to the Child Jesus through dancing continues today even after her death and is still continued through her former students who now teach the youth of Cebu the original dance moves of Sinulog. Sinulog had since very much diversified from the original dance of Titang Diola. Today we can see the Sinulog danced every day at the Basilica Minore del Santo Niño performed by the candle vendors. The version they perform is called "Sinug" and is only for worship and prayer to bless the candles for prayers to the Holy Child. The Sinulog Festival dance performed by contingents in the City Sports Center is still religious and devotional since dancers often include personal supplications, petitions, thanksgivings, intercessions, or any other prayers in their dance for the Child Jesus and their dance performances in street dance and ritual showdown are still centered on the Holy Child. There are mainly two types of Sinulog dances performed in the festival, namely the "Sinulog-Based Category" and the "Free Interpretation Category". The Sinulog-Based Category refers to the Sinulog dance based on the Church Sinulog performed by candle vendors while the Free Interpretation Category refers to the Sinulog dance interpreted in any way, outside Church Sinulog, for as long as it is acceptable in the festival. In recent years, the festival gained commercialization which made the festival and Cebu popular, but unfortunately lessened the religious nature of the festival. Despite the extreme commercialization of the festival, Sinulog still remains to be a religious festival for the faithful. Sinulog still remains to be a dance of prayer. The festival is officially governed by the Sinulog Foundation Incorporated (SFI). The foundation maintains that, although Sinulog has largely become mainstream, it remains a religious festival because at the heart of the Sinulog is the Santo Niño. The foundation has made this point clear in many instances, such as the correction of the wrongful term "Sinulog Grand Mardi Gras" to "Sinulog Grand Parade" as the focus was not on the fanfare but the worship to the Child Jesus.

In the 1980s and 2000s, the city authorities of Cebu added the religious feast of Santo Niño de Cebu during the Sinulog Festival to its cultural event. Despite being a religious festival and a Christian festival, Sinulog has come to be a celebration for all Cebuanos and Filipinos regardless of their faith and practices. Aside from its religious nature, Sinulog has also become renowned for its street parties. In 2012, Cebu introduced Life Dance, the biggest outdoor dance party in the Philippines. The Sinulog street parties are considered a major attraction for youth individuals but, in most cases for most people, particularly the faithful, a growing problem that threatens the religiosity and solemnity of the festival. In 2016, the festival had the worst recorded case of a stampede wherein large groups of people, both worshippers and drunken party-goers, were congested in the uptown area, with no passable exit routes and virtually no crowd control up until midnight and with one recorded case of a teenage woman losing consciousness because of cramped spaces. Due to this incident, the then Cebu City Mayor Tomas Osmeña enforced a strict liquor ban in the following festivals during his term to ensure the safety of the worshippers and spectators and to maintain the solemnity of the celebration.

The festival was halted for two years (2021 and 2022). In 2021, the main reason for halting the festival was because of the COVID-19 pandemic. The Vice Mayor of Cebu at the time, Michael Rama, who was the-then chairperson of the SFI, insisted on having a Sinulog Festival that year, despite health concerns from health experts and the police from Cebu City. This came shortly after Cebu City's then Mayor, the late Edgardo Labella, dissolving the Sinulog Governing Body (SGB), which Rama protested against through his resignation from the foundation, and reinstating him as chairperson of the SFI. Rama cited that the venue of that year's supposed festival was at the parking lot of SM Seaside City Cebu and would be in a "bubble environment" without a live audience. He even went as far as to limit the number of dancers and the propsmen. He continued to insist on holding the festival, largely against the behest of the Cebuanos. Various health workers and police officials stated that even though the dancers were isolated, the fact that there were multiple individuals gathering in a closed environment, and in close contact with each other, was already a "direct violation of the health protocols". This also included the gathering of dancers during their practices. As a result, several dancers from various contingents in Cebu City tested positive for COVID-19 and most of the infected individuals showed the common symptoms. This led to Rama officially retracting his movement for Sinulog 2021. However, the other minor related competitions of the Sinulog, such as the Search for the Sinulog Festival Queen were still pushed through. The festival was slated for a comeback in 2022, but was again cancelled due to the aftermath of Super Typhoon Odette, which ravaged Cebu and nearby islands.

Sinulog eventually was celebrated again in 2023, but was met with controversy. Rama, who is currently the mayor of Cebu City, decided to move the festival from its usual venue at the Cebu City Sports Complex to Citi di Mare at the South Road Properties. This was met with criticism by the Cebuanos as, not only was the Sports Complex the established venue of the festival, but also because the festival was to be moved to a major road that is an important passageway for travellers going from the North to the South and back. Initially, the provincial governor, Gwendolyn Garcia, was not against the move to change the venue of the Sinulog, but immediately changed her mind after she had seen pictures from a newspaper photographer of provincial Sinulog contingents having blockings for their dances in the new venue for the Sinulog which was deeply covered in mud and was completely unfinished. Feeling pity for the dancers, she made the decision to remove the provincial contingents from the grand parade, unless Rama would return the festival to the old venue. Unfortunately, Rama continued insisting on having the Sinulog in SRP and the festival was indeed pushed through in the new venue without the provincial contingents. Not only was the quality of the festival much more lack-luster than it usually was, but there was also heavy traffic during and immediately after the festival as the North and Southbound travelers had to go through the much tighter roads of the city. The provincial contingents, however, did perform in the Sinulog Festival in Carmen that year, which was also the 50th anniversary of the festival in their town. The festival, for the first time, had two major parades in 2024. The "Sinulog sa Lalawigan", which was originally the preliminary competition "Sinulog sa Kabataan sa Lalawigan", was transformed into a Sinulog parade for provincial contingents since they could not, once again, dance in SRP. The Sinulog sa Lalawigan was held in the CCSC, the old venue of Sinulog. The other contingents from Cebu City and out-of-town danced in the Sinulog parade on the 3rd Sunday of January in SRP. On August 21, 2024, Cebu City Acting Mayor Raymond Alvin Garcia declared that Sinulog Festival 2025 would be returned to CCSC. Sinulog Festival 2025 was indeed celebrated in the Sports Complex. The Sinulog Festival that year was the Grandest Festival Celebration in its history. The Sinulog Contingents from the Province of Cebu were finally able to dance for the Little King and gave their best, offering everything for Señor Santo Niño, the King of Cebu. The provincial contingents dominated the festival's winning positions with Carcar City being hailed as returning Champions.

The Sinulog Festival 2026 was again celebrated at the CCSC with minor changes. The festival proper was made more streamlined so that the flow of performances would be smooth and so that the festival would also end earlier. This was done so that people could go home earlier and in order to maintain public safety. This year's Sinulog was the "most organized festival celebration in Cebu" to date.

== Kadaugan sa Mactan ==
Literally translates to the "Victory in Mactan", this is a historical festival reenactment of the Battle of Mactan. Celebrated canonically on April 27, it depicts the events before, during, and immediately after the defeat of Portuguese Navigator Ferdinand Magellan at the hands of Lapu-lapu and his men. Much of the historical activities take place in Mactan Shrine, the site of the Battle of Mactan. Usually, in the Kadaugan sa Mactan, Filipino celebrities, especially celebrities of Cebuano origin, are chosen to portray the key characters of the events of the Battle of Mactan (specifically Lapu-lapu, his wife Reyna Bulakna, and Magellan). This is typically a week-long celebration and culminates with the Rampada Festival, a stylized contemporary reenactment of the victory celebration after the battle in Mactan, incorporating Latin and ballroom dances and steps. Despite the Sinulog Festival being more popular by comparison, the Kadaugan had already been established as a festival of Cebu and its culture and history long before Sinulog was an established festival.

== Pasigarbo sa Sugbo ==
Literally translates to the "Celebration in Cebu", this Festival is a relatively new festival in Cebu, conceptualized in 2008. This festival was the "Brainchild" of Cebu's first female governor, Gwendolyn Garcia. This festival was a program and a major tourism endeavor initiated by the governor in order to promote Cebu as an entire province and to celebrate Cebu in its culture, faith, history, and continuous advancement. In this festival, each individual town in Cebu is encouraged to showcase a theme, a product, a festival, or something unique from their place. Despite, in itself, not being a religious festival, praise, thanksgiving, and worship to God, as well as devotion to the patron saints of each town of Cebu is also given emphasis in the festival (as hinted in the category for portable processional platforms for patron saints or Best in Andas category). Unlike the Sinulog Festival, which is limited to two major categories (Sinulog-based and Free Interpretation), Participants of Pasigarbo are given more freedom in the interpretation of the culture, faith, history, and products of their hometowns.

Ever since its conception, the festival had been celebrated yearly at the Cebu International Convention Center (CICC) in Mandaue, around the date of the Provincial Charter Day of Cebu, which is celebrated every August 6, however, was ceased after 2012. This was largely due to the 2013 Bohol earthquake, which also heavily affected Cebu, as well as the lack of support from the provincial government for both the repair of the CICC and the festival itself. This was mainly because Garcia was no longer in position as governor at the time. Fortunately, the festival was relaunched in 2019, less than a month after Garcia's return to the provincial seat. Unlike previous celebrations, the 2019 Pasigarbo, due to the abandoned state of the CICC, was celebrated, much like the Sinulog Festival, in the Cebu City Sports Complex. It has established itself once more as a provincial festival and a new addition to Cebu's prime festivals and significant dates, together with the Sinulog Festival and the Kadaugan sa Mactan. The festival was also halted in 2021 because of the COVID-19 pandemic but returned the following year in 2022.

In 2022, the festival had a grand comeback and was even participated by the festivals of all three independent city (Sinulog Festival of Cebu City, Panagtagbo Festival of Mandaue City, and the Garbo Festival of Lapu-lapu City), with cities Cebu and Lapu-lapu being guest performers. The festival was again moved to the Carcar City Sports Complex the following year. This was due to the ongoing renovation of the Cebu City Sports Complex, its usual venue. The move to Carcar City, was initially a very openly accepted one, however, the festival was marred by various technical difficulties on the day of the Pasigarbo sa Sugbo. Among the major problems during the festival proper was the sound glitches in certain festival jingles and in the Mayor's introductory videos, which was a new feature in this particular festival celebration. The sound glitches consisted mostly of sudden stops of the music of each festival performance, either as just a random audio cut or a complete loss of music. Governor Garcia publicly accused the sounds and lights provider for allegedly "sabotaging" the festival in most of the occurrences of a sound glitch. This accusation of a sabotage from the sounds and lights company head was largely due to the alleged nondisclosure that his daughter was a contestant for festival queen, who was also originally hailed as the Pasigarbo sa Sugbo Festival queen that year, with her contingent being the original champion. Though his daughter was chosen to be festival queen by the Carcar City Government for being the reigning Kabkaban Festival Queen at that time, the governor still insisted that this was a sabotage on his part under the reason that he had not fully disclosed his daughter's participation in the festival. This resulted in the postponement of the awarding ceremonies for that year's festival and a re-tabulation of the scoresheets of each festival. This further resulted in the candidate from Carcar losing her crown and the Kabkaban Festival contingent from Carcar losing their championship and being demoted to 6th place. The new festival queen was the candidate from Cordova and the new champion was the Sugat Kabanhawan Festival contingent from Minglanilla. The awarding ceremonies were held two months after the actual festival in the Cebu Technological University-Dumanjug Campus.

The festival was moved back to CCSC in 2024, and was considered the "grandest", to date. Among the new additions and changes to the festival was the change of the processional Andas to the much larger processional Caro or processional carriage. Naga's Dagitab Festival was the new champion in the ritual showdown category and the Kabkaban festival was the champion of the street dancing category, with their queen becoming the festival queen. A special award was given to the town of Dumanjug for coming up with an impromptu float using the props of the town's Bisnok Festival after their original float had suddenly caught fire and was completely destroyed and for giving an all out performance in the festival, in spite of the unforeseen events that transpired in 2024's festival. The festival was placed under a hiatus after a change of leadership but has recently been revived under a new name. Although the current Cebu Governor, Pam Baricuatro, had initially opposed having a festival of festivals in Cebu, citing budget concerns and logistics, she has since rescinded her initial stand and has announced that the Festival of Festivals would return this coming August 2026, albeit with a different name.

== Panagtagbo sa Mandaue ==
This is a religious festival from Mandaue City that is in honor of the Holy Family and is greatly inspired from and is associated directly with the religious activities of the Sinulog Festival. The name of the festival is the Cebuano term for "gathering". This is because the festival celebrates the Translacion of the Santo Niño de Cebu and Our Lady of Guadalupe to the National Shrine of St. Joseph, the patron saint of Mandaue. It replaced the Mantawi Festival as the festival of Mandaue. The Festival was traditionally celebrated on the Thursday before the Sinulog Festival or the day before the Translacion which marks the start of the Triduum of the "Fiesta Señor" activities, but was moved to May, coinciding with the feast of St. Joseph the Worker.

== Sugat Kabanhawan ==
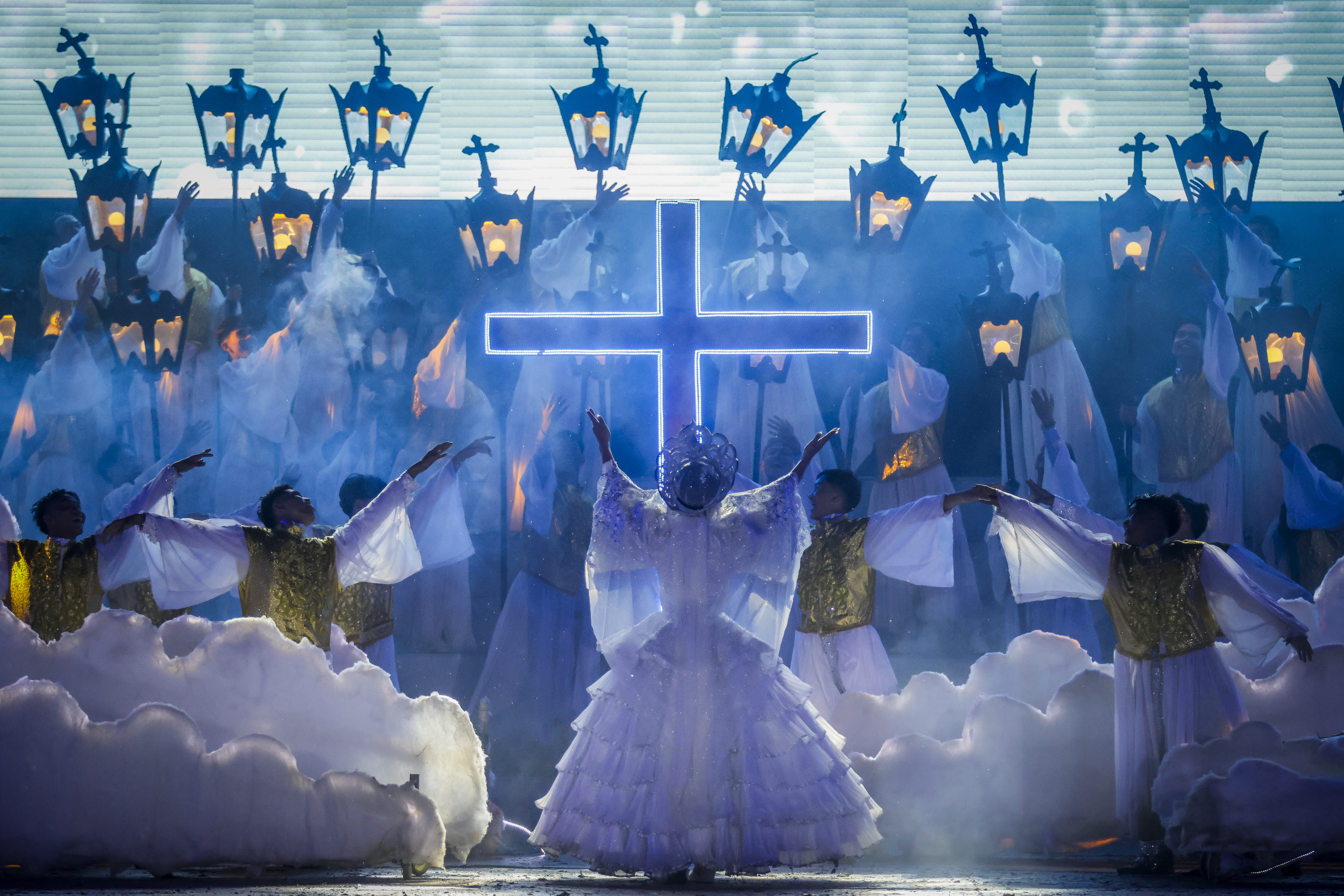
Sugat Kabanhawan Festival dancers in Pasigarbo sa Sugbo 2024.

This is the Easter Festival of Minglanilla. It is held in honor of Jesus Christ as the "Risen Lord". It celebrates the mystery of the Resurrection of Jesus and the traditional belief of the faithful in Christ's apparition to the Blessed Virgin Mary in a private revelation in order to reveal to her that He had risen from the dead and is truly God. The festival's name is taken from the term Sugat (Cebuano) or Salubong (Filipino) which is a traditional practice during Easter Vigils wherein an image of Christ is shown before an image of the Virgin Mary that is covered in a black veil to show her mourning and sadness, which is then lifted by angels, exposing the Virgin Mary with unspeakable joy at the Resurrection of Jesus. The second part of the name is the Cebuano word for "resurrection", which is timely for the religious celebration. The festival is centered on the life of Jesus, as well as Christian Morals and Values, with both themes being heavily incorporated in the performances of the dancers in the festival. This festival has gained Minglanilla the title as the "Easter Capital of Cebu". The festival was the champion of Pasigarbo sa Sugbo 2023.

== Kabkaban ==
The Kabkaban Festival is the local religious festival of the City of Carcar in honor of St. Catherine of Alexandria. The festival's name was the old name of Carcar, which was taken from Kabkab ("Kabkaban" for plural), the local term for the Oakleaf Fern (Aglaomorpha quercifolia). The festival celebrates Carcar, as well as the Carcaranon way of life and the town's culture, faith, and musical history. Much of the dance steps used in the Kabkaban dance were taken and inspired directly from the dance moves used in the Sinulog Festival and other Sinulog dance offerings by the Sandiego Family with their company, the "Sandiego Dance Company", headed by Val Sandiego, a native of Carcar who is also considered as the "Father of Kabkaban". The inspiration from the dance company is also evident in the costumes used by the dancers of the Kabkaban Festival, as well as dancers representing Carcar in the Sinulog Festival or other festivals like the Pasigarbo sa Sugbo Festival of Festivals. The Kabkaban festival is also one of the consistent champions of Pasigarbo sa Sugbo, with 3 titles attributed to them (2011, 2019, 2022) and the most number of festival queens and awards under their belt. The Kabkaban festival is celebrated from the 23rd until November 25, in line with the feast day of the town's patron saint.

== La Torta ==
The La Torta Festival is Argao's food festival. It is in honor of St. Michael the Archangel. It replaced Argao's former festival, the "Pitlagong Festival" in 2011. It celebrates the Torta, a Cebuano tart-like cake that is reminiscent of the Spanish cake, but distinct in its recipe as it uses Tubâ or coconut wine as a rising agent instead of yeast. Because Argao is one of Cebu's Spanish Towns (the other being Liloan), dancers in the La Torta Festival wear Spanish inspired costumes that usually have a red motif to them and dance Spanish dance steps or Spanish-inspired dance steps. It is celebrated on September 28 to 29 to coincide with the feast of the archangels.

== Dagitab ==
The Dagitab Festival is Naga's Christmas Festival. It is in honor of St. Francis of Assisi. The name of the festival means "electric light" which is what Naga is known for, particularly during the Holidays. During December, Naga's streets, parks, and buildings are lit with all sorts of bright lights of different colors to mark the Holiday Season. But these bright lights come at a cost, power outages. To resolve this problem, the Provincial Government of Cebu set up another electric company to supply electricity in the town. The onset of electric advancements and greater connection initiated the start of the industrialization of Naga. The industrial movement is also one of the focuses of the festival. Dancers in the Dagitab Festival wear and incorporate LED lights/lamps in their lively performances to bring the Holiday Spirit to everyone and to celebrate the advancement of the city. This festival has gained Naga the titles of being the "Christmas Capital of Cebu" and the "Industrial Hub of the South". Despite being in honor of St. Francis, whose feast day is on October 4, the festival is celebrated on December 23 which is two days before Christmas Day. The festival was the champion of the Pasigarbo sa Sugbo 2024.

== Halad Inasal ==
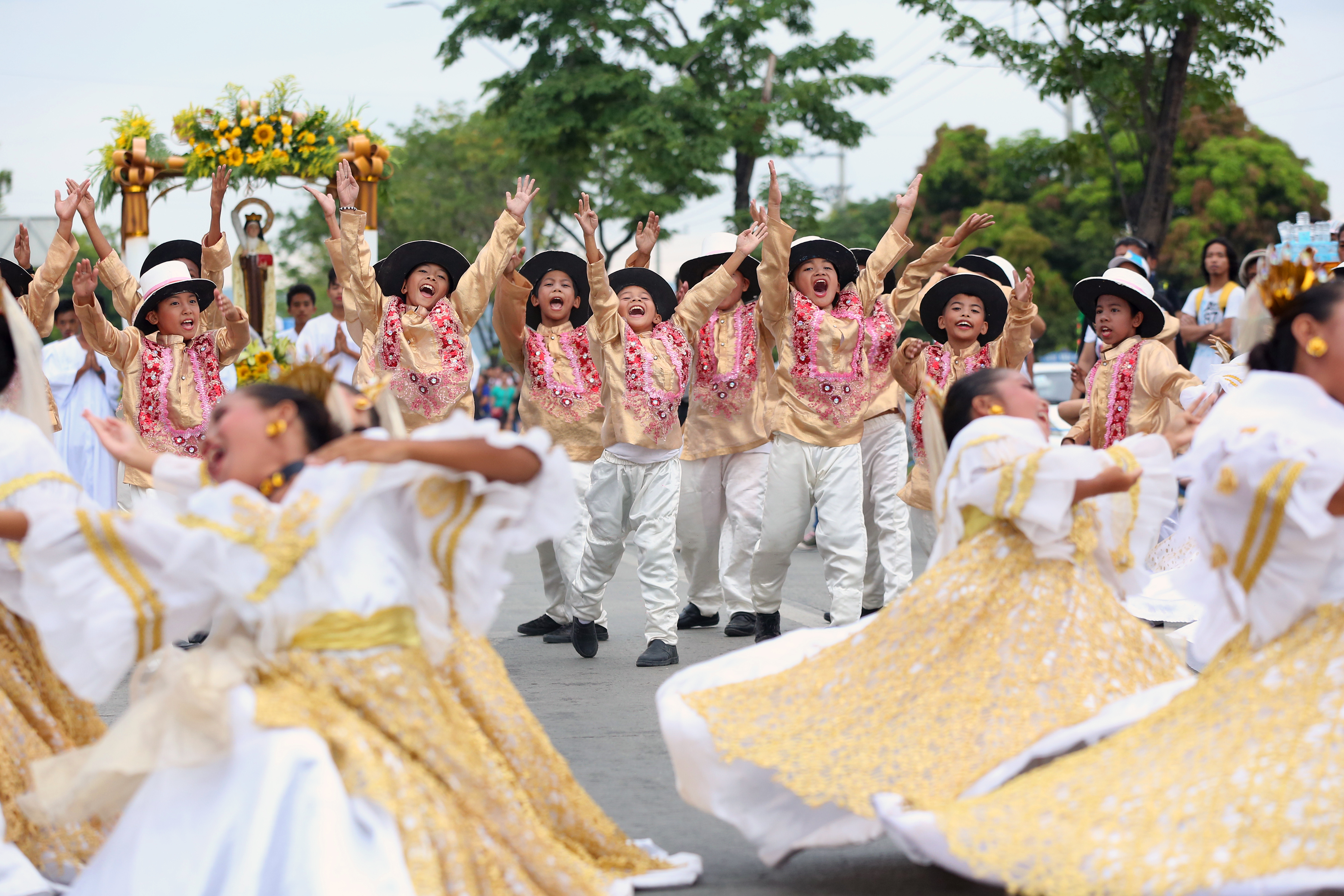
Halad Inasal Festival dancers performing their street dance in 2019.

The Halad Inasal Festival is Talisay City's food festival. It is in honor of St. Teresa of Avila. The name of the festival is taken from the Cebuano words Halad, which means offering, and Inasal, which refers to the local term for Lechon or Philippine Roasted Pig. Cebu is well known for producing Lechon Inasal and has two towns that are dedicated "Lechon Towns" with one being Talisay (the other being Carcar). The festival was formerly called simply the "Inasal Festival", but was renamed as "Halad Inasal Festival" to highlight the religiosity of the festival. In the Halad Inasal Festival, dancers and participants parade freshly roasted and crunchy Inasal in the streets of Talisay while they perform their dance offerings and bring them even while they perform their ritual showdown. It is celebrated around, but never directly on October 15, the feast of St. Teresa, so as not to interfere with the religious activities of the town feast.

== Bonga ==
The Bonga Festival is the Harvest Festival of Sibonga. It is in honor of the town's two patron saints, St. Philomena and Our Lady of the Pillar. The name of the festival is the Cebuano word for "fruit". It is a festival of thanksgiving for the bountiful fruit harvest during the harvest season of the town. It is celebrated on August 9th, in line with the feast of the second patroness of the town, St. Philomena. The festival has given the town its very own title as the "Fruit Basket of Cebu".

== Rosquillos ==
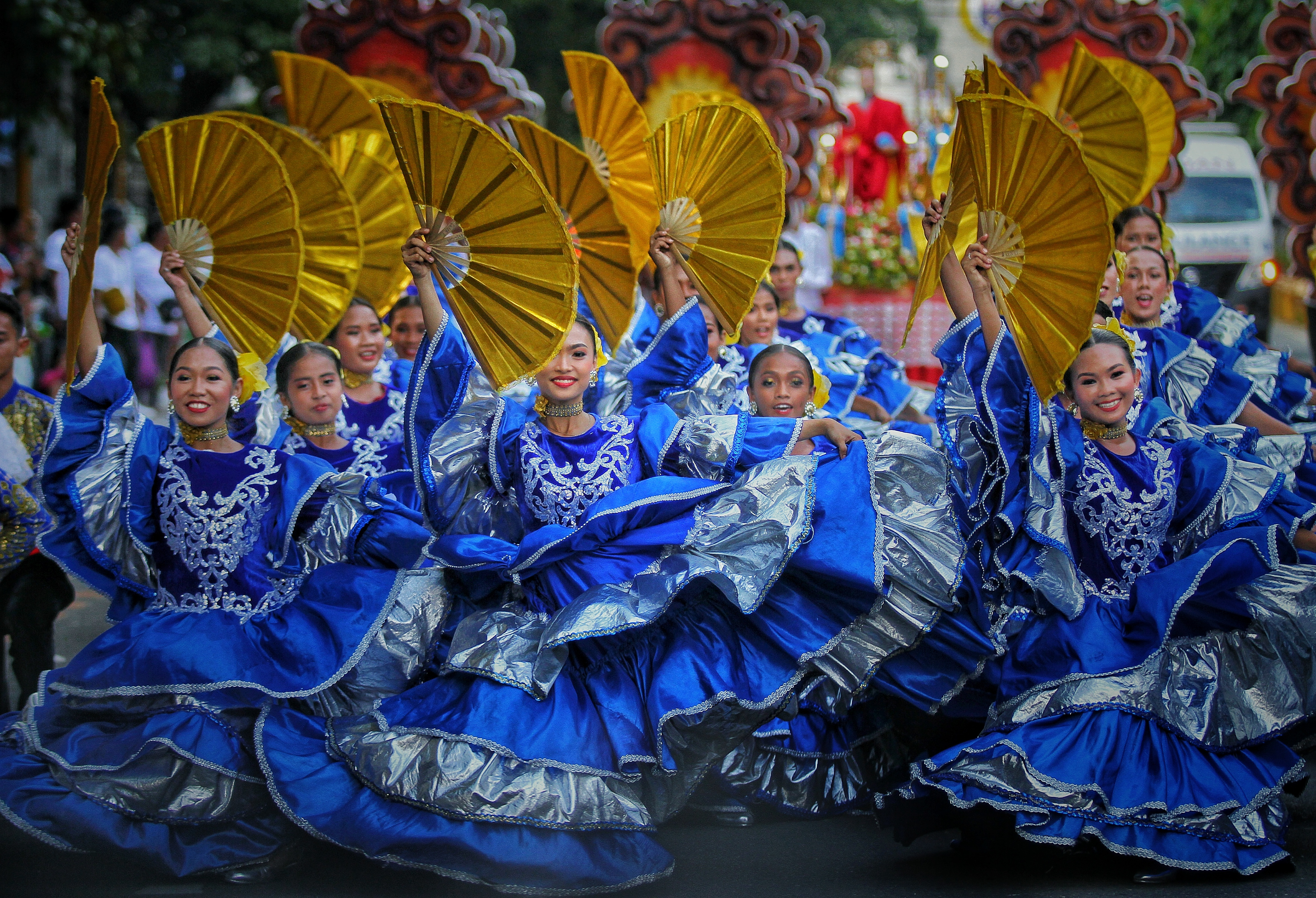
Rosquillos Festival dancers as they perform their street dance in Pasigarbo sa Sugbo 2019.

The Rosquillos festival is the food festival of Liloan. It is in honor of St. Ferdinand of Castille. It celebrates the Rosquillos, a Philippine ring type cookie that originated from Liloan. The cookie was conceptualized and conceived by a woman named Titay Frasco, who was the founder of Titay's, the largest chain company of Rosquillos in the Philippines. The Rosquillos festival has 1 victory in the Pasigarbo sa Sugbo (2012). It is celebrated on May 30.

== Kagasangan ==
This is the sea festival of Moalboal. It is in honor of St. John of Nepomuk. The name of the festival is taken from the Cebuano term for "coral reefs". It is a nature-tourism project initiated by the local government made to preserve the reefs of the town, which are viable sources of livelihood and eco-tourism. This is one of the known sea festivals in the province of Cebu. It is celebrated on May 16.

== Utanon ==
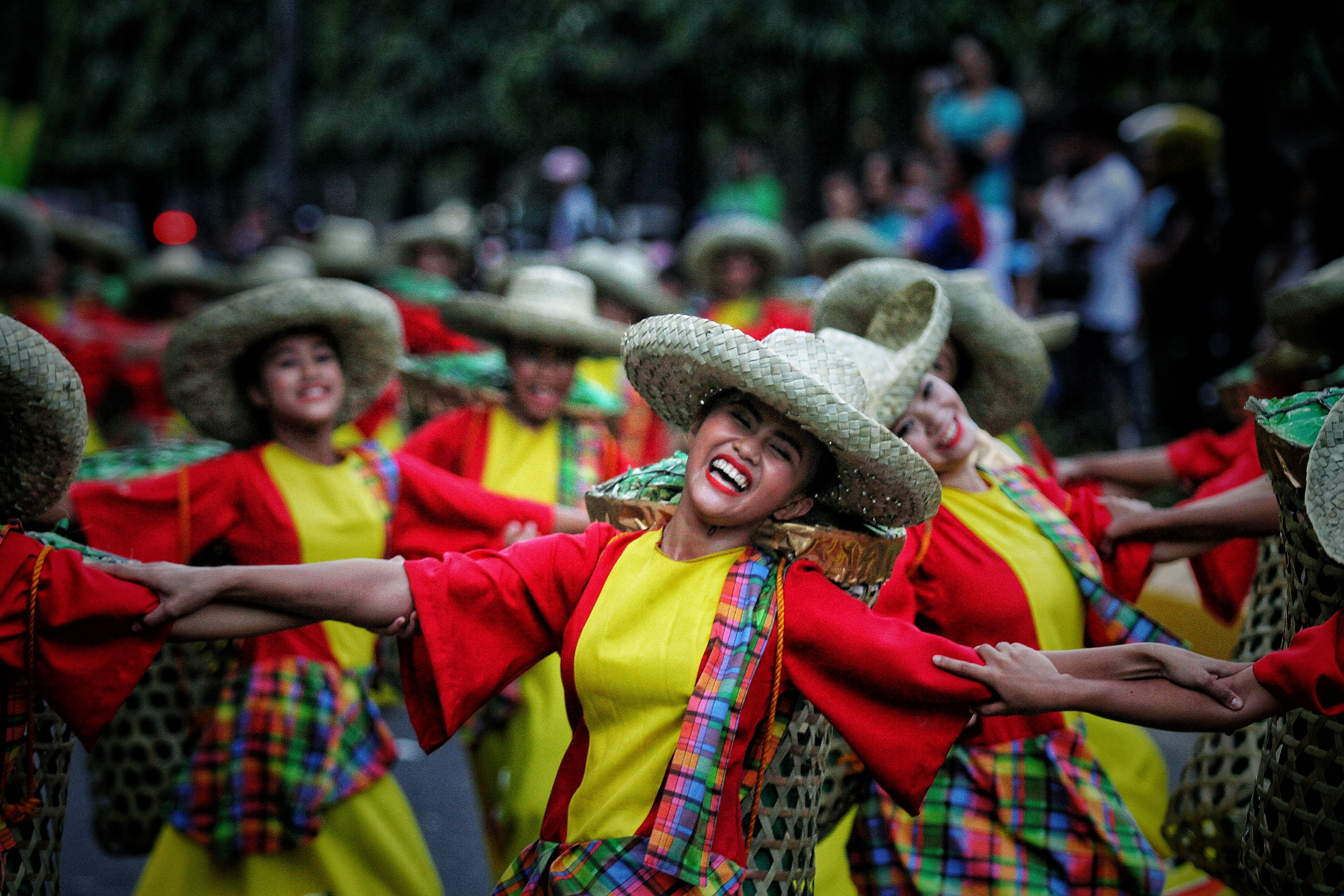
Utanon Festival dancers in Pasigarbo sa Sugbo 2019.

The Utanon Festival of Dalaguete, is the town's harvest festival. It is in honor of St. William the Hermit. The name of the festival is the Cebuano word for "vegetables". It is a festival about showing thanksgiving for the bountiful harvest of vegetables in the town, all year round. It is celebrated on February 10. The festival has helped acknowledge the town as a producer of grain and vegetable crops, giving the town the title as the "Salad Bowl of Cebu" and the "Vegetable Basket of Cebu".

== Siloy ==
The Siloy Festival is Alcoy's nature festival and eco-tourism project. It is in honor of St. Rose of Lima. The festival takes its name from the local term of the Black Shama Bird (Copsychus Cebuensis), a local species of song bird only found in Cebu, with its last stronghold in Alcoy's rainforest and woody areas. The festival is a project meant to promote awareness of the Black Shama and its endangered nature and to help preserve Cebu's endemic Shama species of birds, as well to help save Mother Earth. It is celebrated on August 23 every year.

== Palawod ==
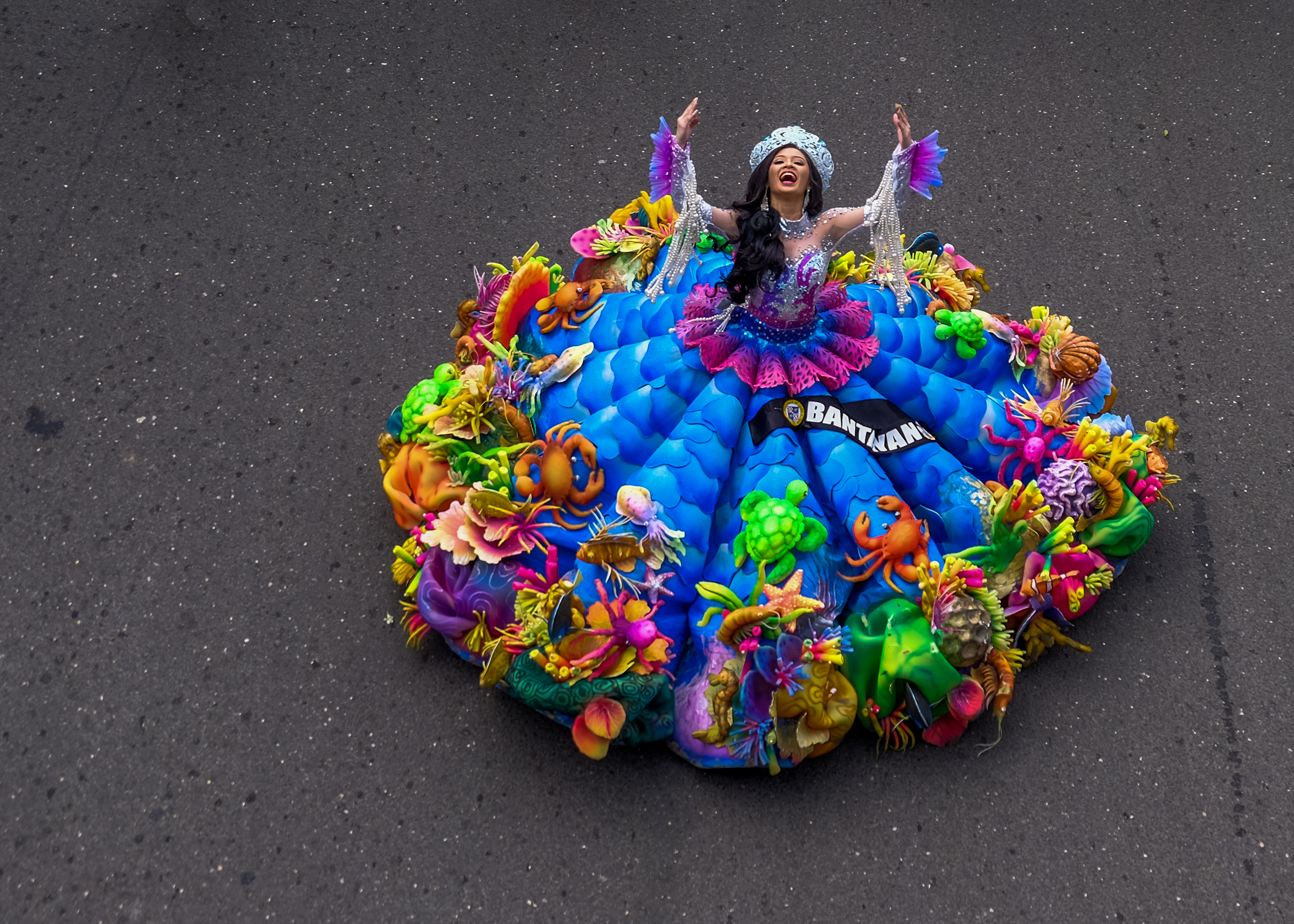
The Palawod Festival Queen representing Bantayan together with her contingent in Pasigarbo sa Sugbo 2019.

The Palawod Festival is the sea festival of Bantayan. It is in honor of Sts. Peter and Paul, who are both the town's patron saints. The festival's name means "to voyage into deep waters". The Palawod dance has four basic steps, namely, Sulo (Torch), Bugsay (Paddle), Silik (Fins), and Isda (Fish). These are all a mimesis of the fishing practices of the Bantayanons. This is a festival of thanksgiving for the bountiful catch and for the abundance of the sea and its bounty. The Palawod festival was the first contingent of Pasigarbo sa Sugbo to have consecutive championships attributed to them. It is celebrated on the 29th of the month of June to be connected with the Solemnity of Sts. Peter and Paul. The Palawod Festival was the first Pasigarbo sa Sugbo Champion and the festival's first and only Hall-of-Famer, maintaining its championship status for three consecutive years (2008, 2009, and 2010).

== Tostado ==
The Tostado festival is the food festival of Santander. It is in honor of St. Gabriel the Archangel. It celebrates the Tostado, a Cebuano shortbread cookie that is shaped like a flower. The local economy had been heavily boosted thanks to the Tostado cookie, which had provided job opportunities for many people. This festival also celebrates the resources of the town. It is celebrated on the 3rd Sunday of April.

== Isda ==
This is the sea festival and town fiesta of Madridejos. It is in honor of the Immaculate Conception. The name of the festival is the Cebuano word for "fish". It celebrates the bountiful catch and the abundance of fish species and other marine life in the area. It is celebrated on December 8, which is also the Solemnity of the Immaculate Conception of the Blessed Virgin Mary.

== Banig ==
This is the weaving festival of Badian. It is in honor of St. James the Great. It celebrates the Banig, a hand-woven Philippine mat made from Pandanus leaves that is commonly sold, in the province, in Badian. It is celebrated on the 25th of the month of July.

== Hinulawan ==
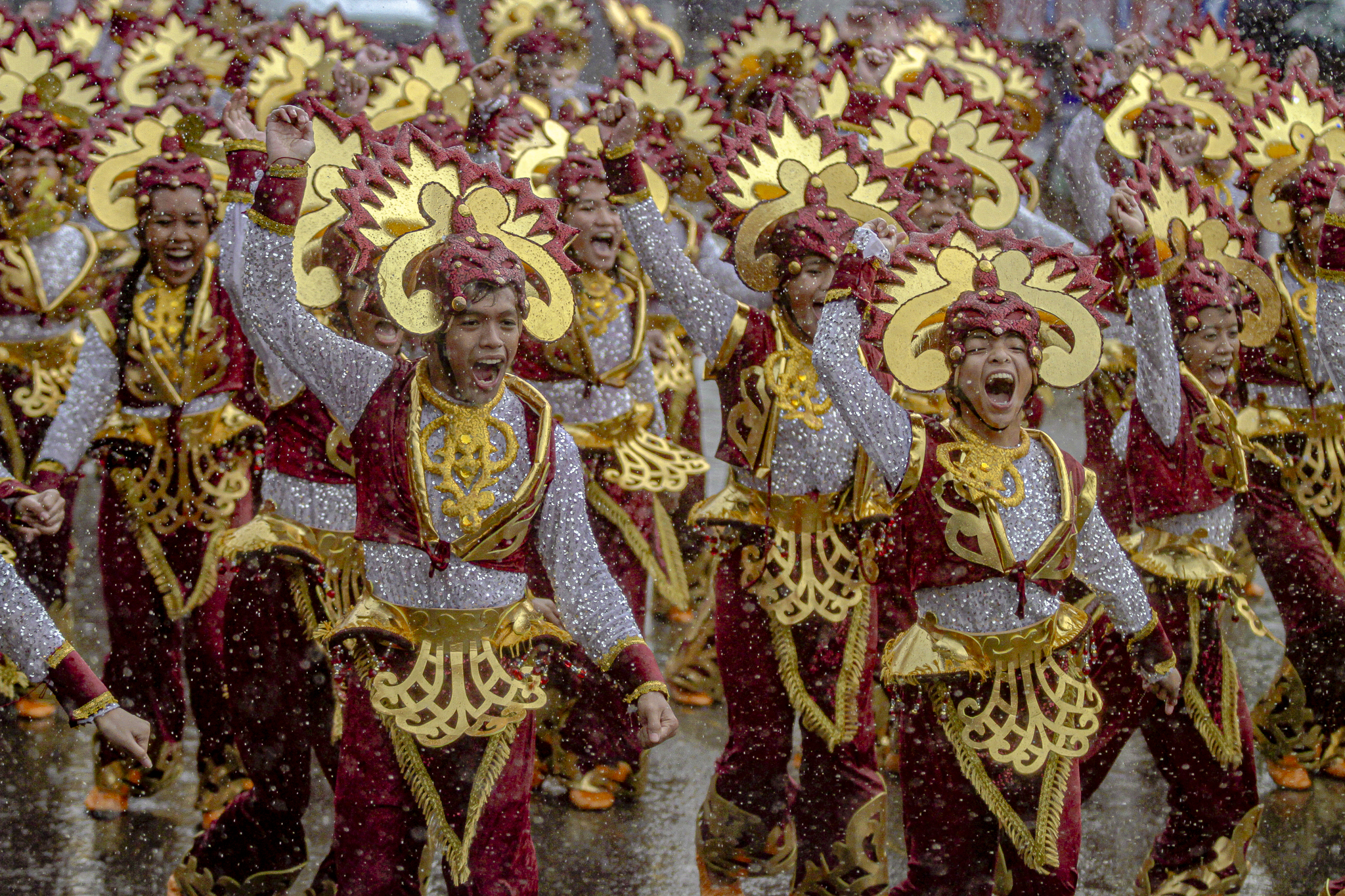
Hinulawan Festival dancers during Toledo town fiesta.

This is the town fiesta of Toledo City. It is in honor of St. John of Sahagun. The name of this festival is an amalgamation of two Cebuano words, Hinaguan, which means "fruits of labor", and Bulawan, which means "bright" or "golden". This was, historically, the old name of the town. Currently, it is the name of a river that is found in the town. Hinulawan Festival celebrates the rich culture and history of the town, as well as the golden hearts and the shining and welcoming personality of the Toledohanons. It falls on June 12, which coincides with the Philippine Independence Day celebration.

== Toslob ==
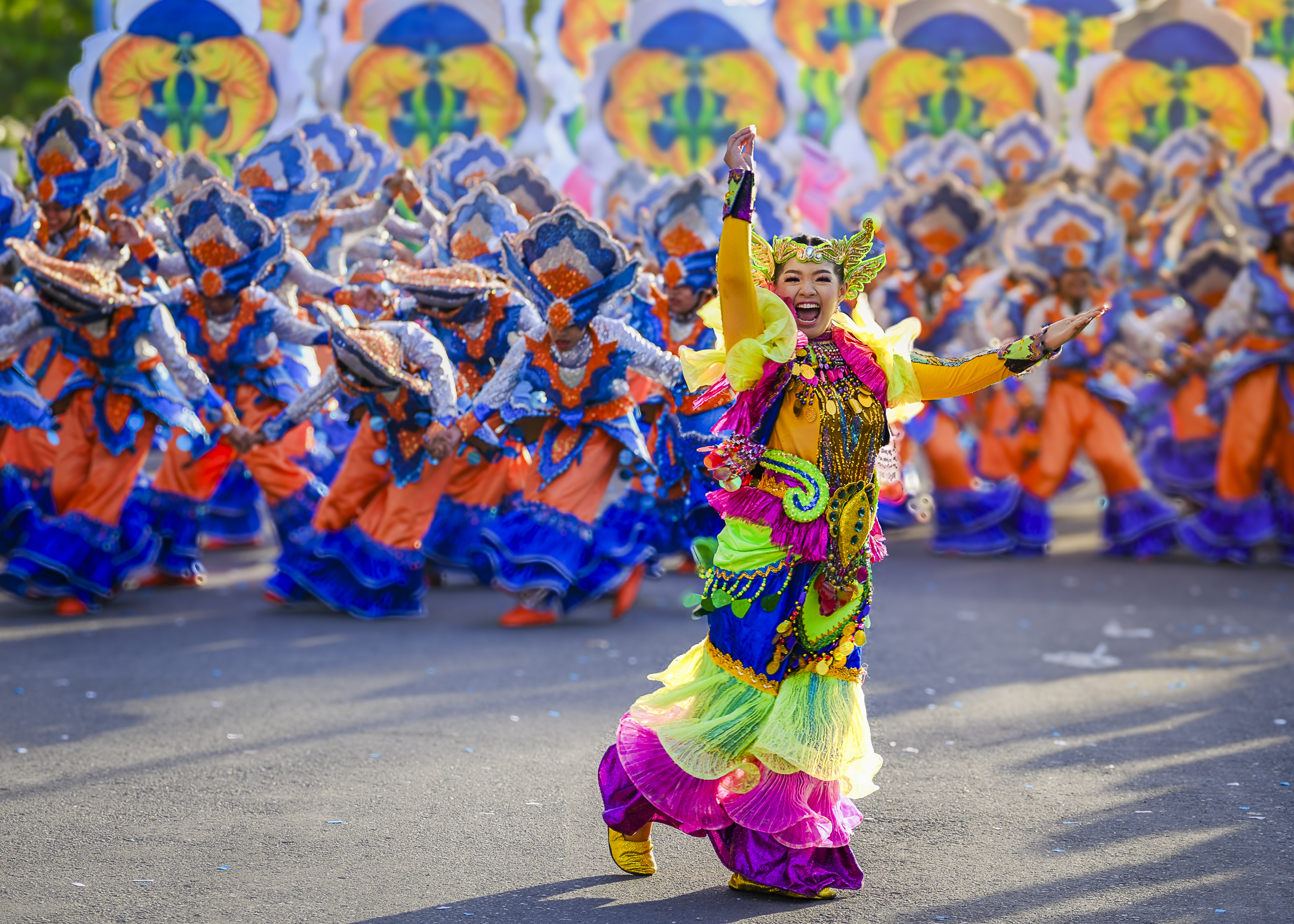
Toslob Festival dancers during Toslob town fiesta.

Originally called the "Sadsad Festival", this is the local festival of Oslob. It is in honor of the Immaculate Conception. The name of the festival is the Cebuano term for the act of "dipping". The name of the festival is a reference to the etymology of the name of the town wherein two Spanish soldiers mistakenly identified the town after asking a couple who, due to misinterpretation, thought they were referring to what they were doing. The couple did not understand that the soldiers were asking for the name of the town and simply thought they were referring to the boiled bananas they were dipping in salted vinegar so all they could utter was "Toslob". The soldiers seemingly also misheard them and thought they said "Oslob". Ever since then, the town was referred to by that name which the Spanish Soldiers heard. The Toslob festival is a celebration of thanksgiving for the graces received as a town community. It is celebrated on December 8, which is also the Solemnity of the Immaculate Conception of the Blessed Virgin Mary.

== Pamuhuan/Pinamuohan ==
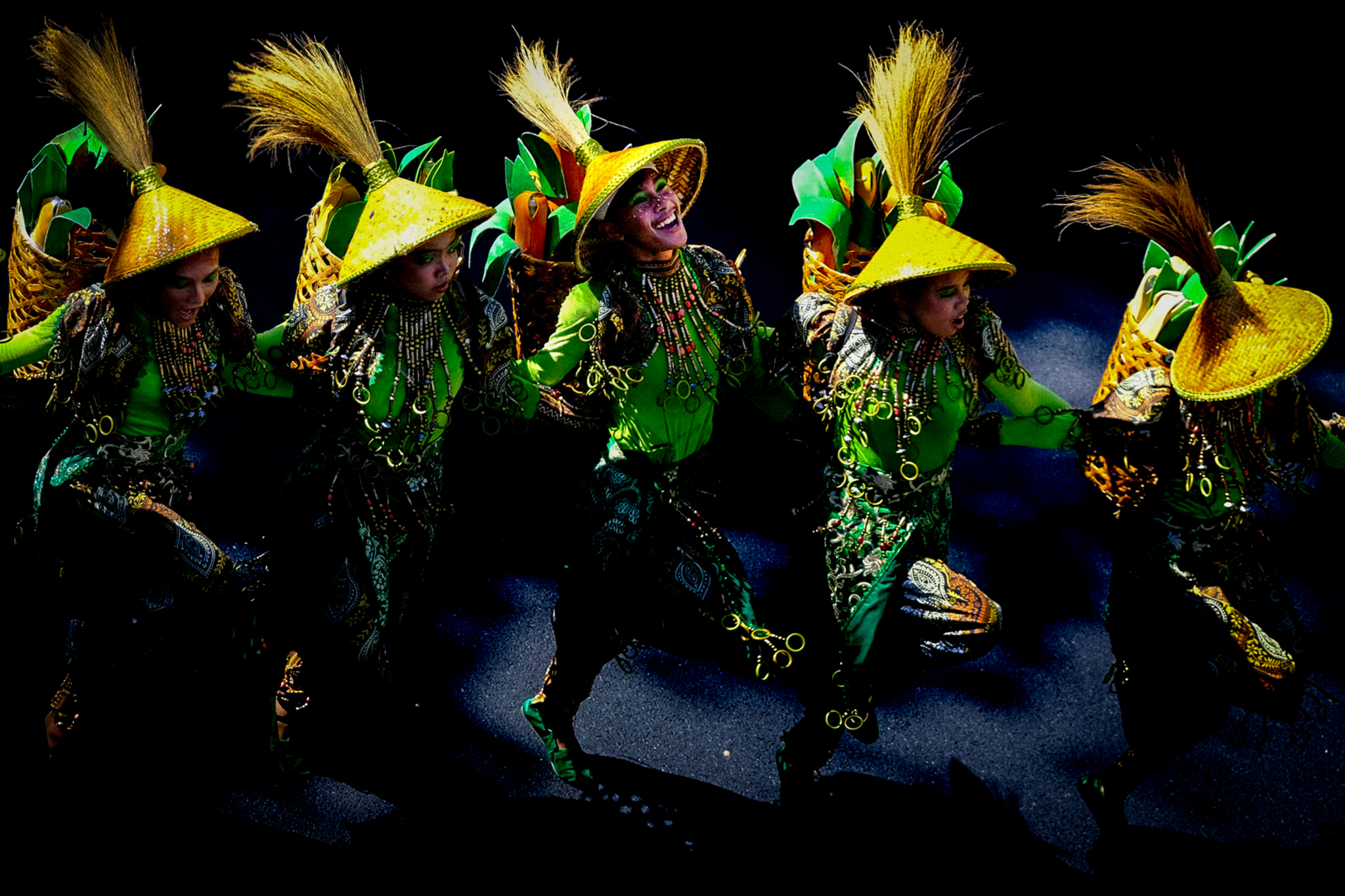
Pinamuohan Festival dancers performing their street dancing performance in Pasigarbo sa Sugbo 2022.

This is the harvest festival of Pinamungajan. It is in honor of St. Monica. The name of the festival came from the Cebuano word, Pinamuhuan, which means "a worker's share of the harvest". It is a celebration of thanksgiving for the bountiful harvest in the town. It is celebrated on August 27.

== Lalin ==
This is the town fiesta of Asturias. It is in honor of St. Roch. The name of the festival comes from the Cebuano word which refers to the combination of cultures of different people. The festival's name was taken from the old name of the town, which was Naghalin. The town was called "Naghalin" because it was a place where migrants settled and formed a neighborhood. The neighborhood soon flourished into a community and a town of Cebu. This festival is a celebration of thanksgiving for the graces received by the town and the community. It is celebrated on August 16.

== Panagsogod ==
This is the town fiesta of Sogod. It is in honor of St. James the Great. The name of the festival is taken from the Cebuano word for "Beginning" and is a reference to the town being the "place of origin of the North and the South" or "where the North and the South meet". This is because the shoreline of Sogod is composed of half white sand from the North of Cebu and half black sand from the South. It is a celebration of happy endings and new beginnings every year. It is celebrated on the 25th of the month of July.

== Sarok ==
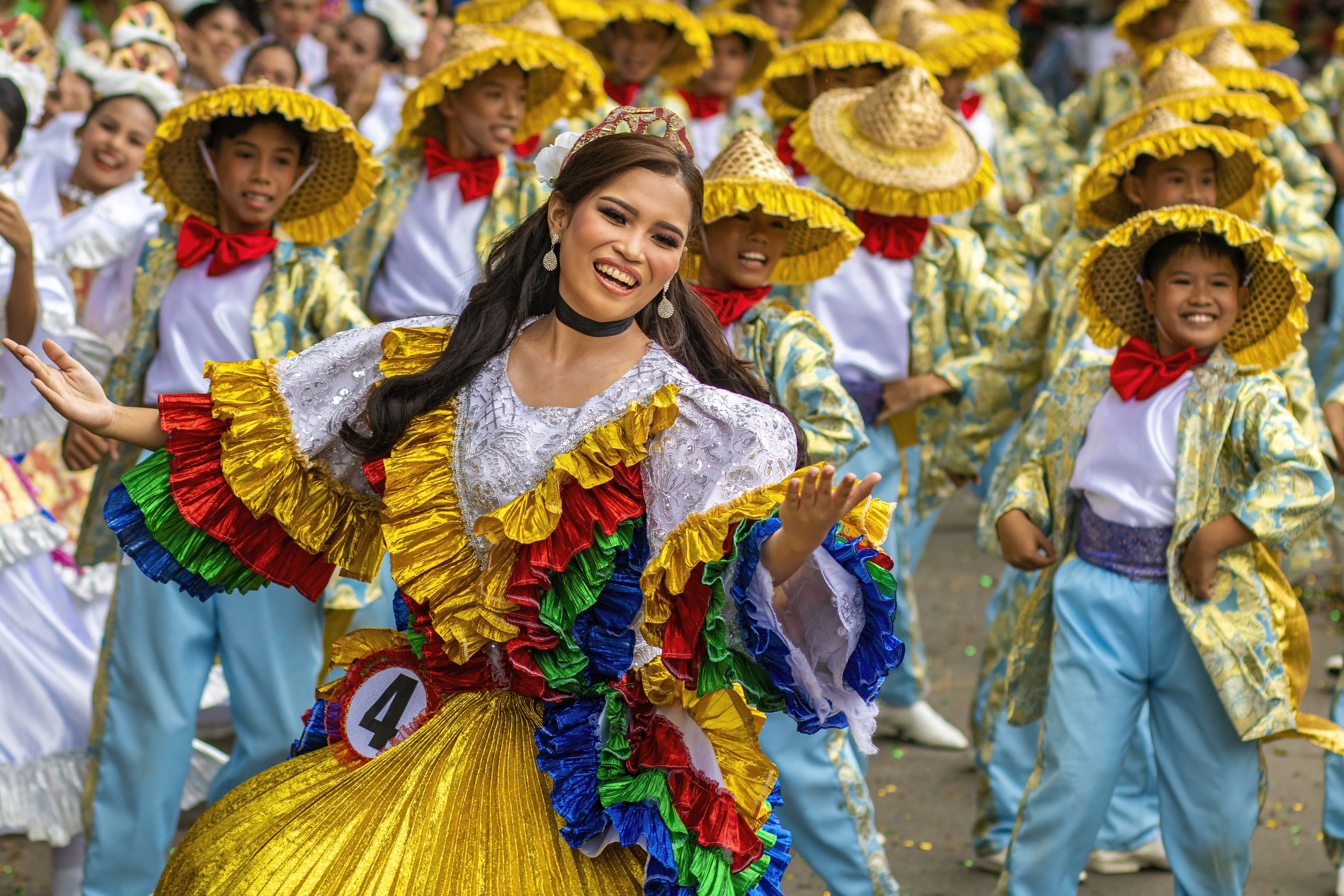
A Sarok Festival Queen with her contingent performing their street dance together with their Sarok hats in 2025.

The Sarok Festival is the town fiesta of Consolacion. It is in honor of St. Narcissus. It celebrates the Sarok, a Cebuano variant of the Salakot that is made of woven Stalks from the Nito plant (Lygodium Circinnatum) and/or dried leaves or Bamboo, creating a patterned net-like structure, with a signature six-petal flower design made from lighter leaves or thin Bamboo wood plates secured at the very top of the hat. It is celebrated every February 14 (coinciding with Valentine's Day), in commemoration of Consolacion's Founding Anniversary.

== Panagbagat ==
This festival is the town fiesta of Poro. It replaced the "Tagbo" Festival as the official town fiesta. The festival is in honor of the Our Lady of the Rosary. The name of the festival is the Cebuano word for the act of "meeting", or "to meet". This is taken from the history of the town of Poro, wherein two warring tribes met together on one spot to make a community, eventually forming the town of Poro. It is a celebration of unity amongst people of different walks of life for the purpose of one cause. It is celebrated on October.

== Tubod ==
This is the town fiesta of Tuburan. It is in honor of St. Anthony of Padua. The name of the festival is the Cebuano word for "Spring". It celebrates the 7 springs of Tuburan, which are said to be the tears of fairies who continue to cry today, yearning and waiting for their lovers to return. The springs have become the main tourist attractions of Tuburan and have placed the town on the map. It is celebrated on June 13

== Katubhan ==
This is the harvest festival Medellin. It was formerly Medellin's Sinulog Festival, but was changed to its own festival to make it distinct from Sinulog and to focus on the main products of the town, Sugarcane and Sugar. However, it is still in honor of Santo Niño. The name of the festival is taken from the Cebuano term for "sugarcane plantation". It is a festival meant to be a thanksgiving to the Child Jesus for the bountiful harvest of sugarcane all year round. The sugarcane has become so abundant in the town that Medellin has received the title as "The Sugar Bowl of Cebu". It is celebrated every April 27.

== Panuhog ==
This is the sea festival of Santa Fe. It replaced the "Puting Baybay" Festival as the official town fiesta. It was also formerly the Sinulog festival of the town, but was changed to its own distinct festival. Like Sinulog, it is in honor of Santo Niño. The name of the festival is taken from the Cebuano word for "stringing things together". This refers to the act of stringing shells found on the shorelines to form various crafts and ornaments, from chandeliers, to wind chimes, bracelets, keychains, tourism giftshop items, etc. It celebrates the shell craft industry, which is one of the main industries of the town (the others being fishing and beach resort management). It is meant to be a thanksgiving to the Child Jesus for blessing the town with beautiful beaches and bountiful marine life. It is celebrated every October 2.

== Lingaw-sadya ==
This is the town fiesta of Balamban. It is in honor of St. Francis of Assisi. The name of the festival is derived from 2 Cebuano words, namely lingaw, which means "enjoyment", and sadya, which means "happiness". It is a celebration that celebrates Balamban as a center for mountain climbing and merry-making. It is meant to be a celebration of happy moments and all the good times each year. It is celebrated on the October 3 to 4, around the feast of the town's patron saint.

== Garbo ==
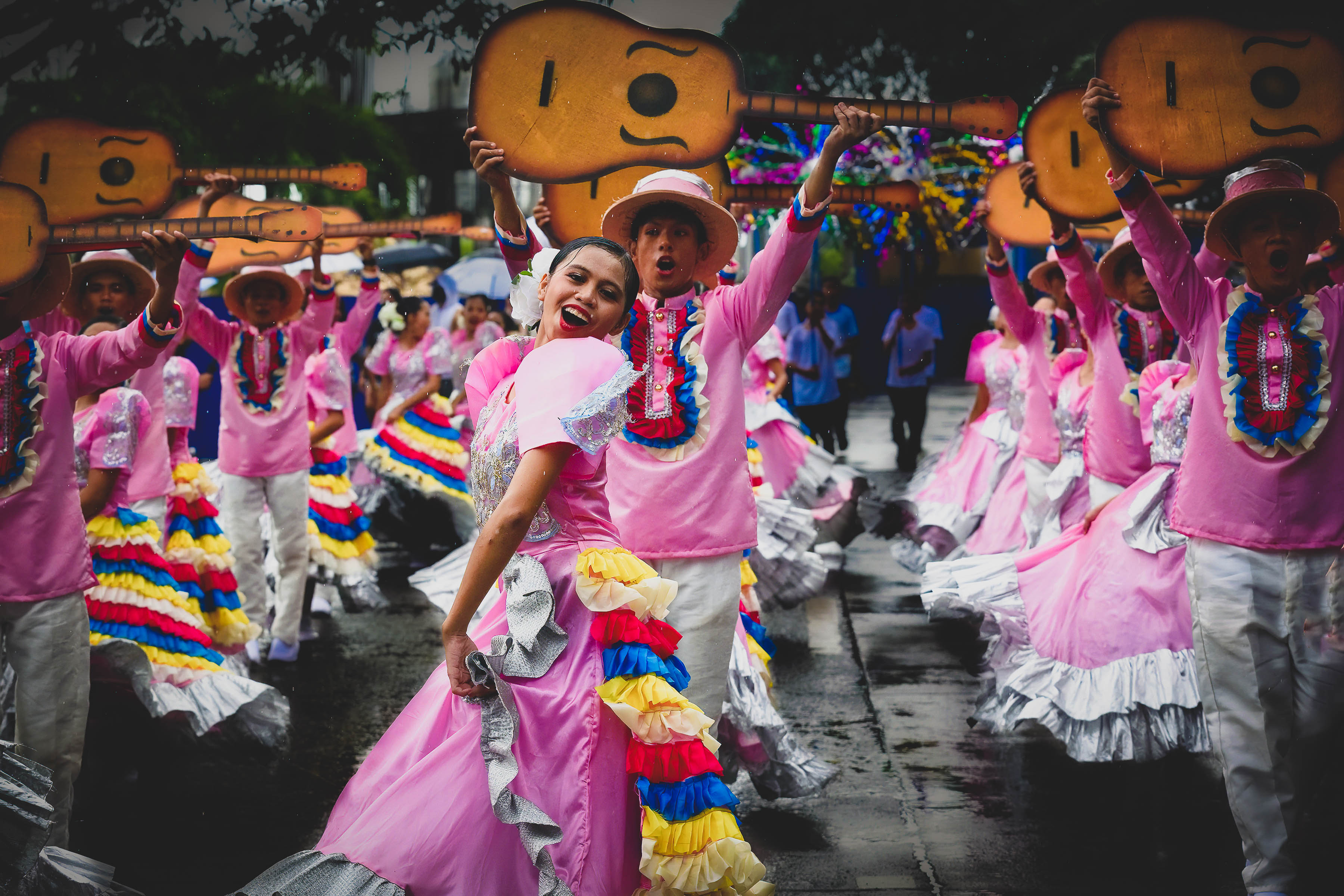
Garbo Festival dancers performing their street dance in 2022.

This is the town fiesta of Lapu-lapu City. It is in honor of Our Lady of the Rule, the Virgin Mary depicted as a Black Madonna. The name of the festival is the Cebuano word for "pride". It is a celebration of all things proudly Oponganon and a thanksgiving to the Blessed Virgin for her intercession and for all graces received every year. It is celebrated around the feast day of the Virgin Mary which is every November 21.

== Karansa ==
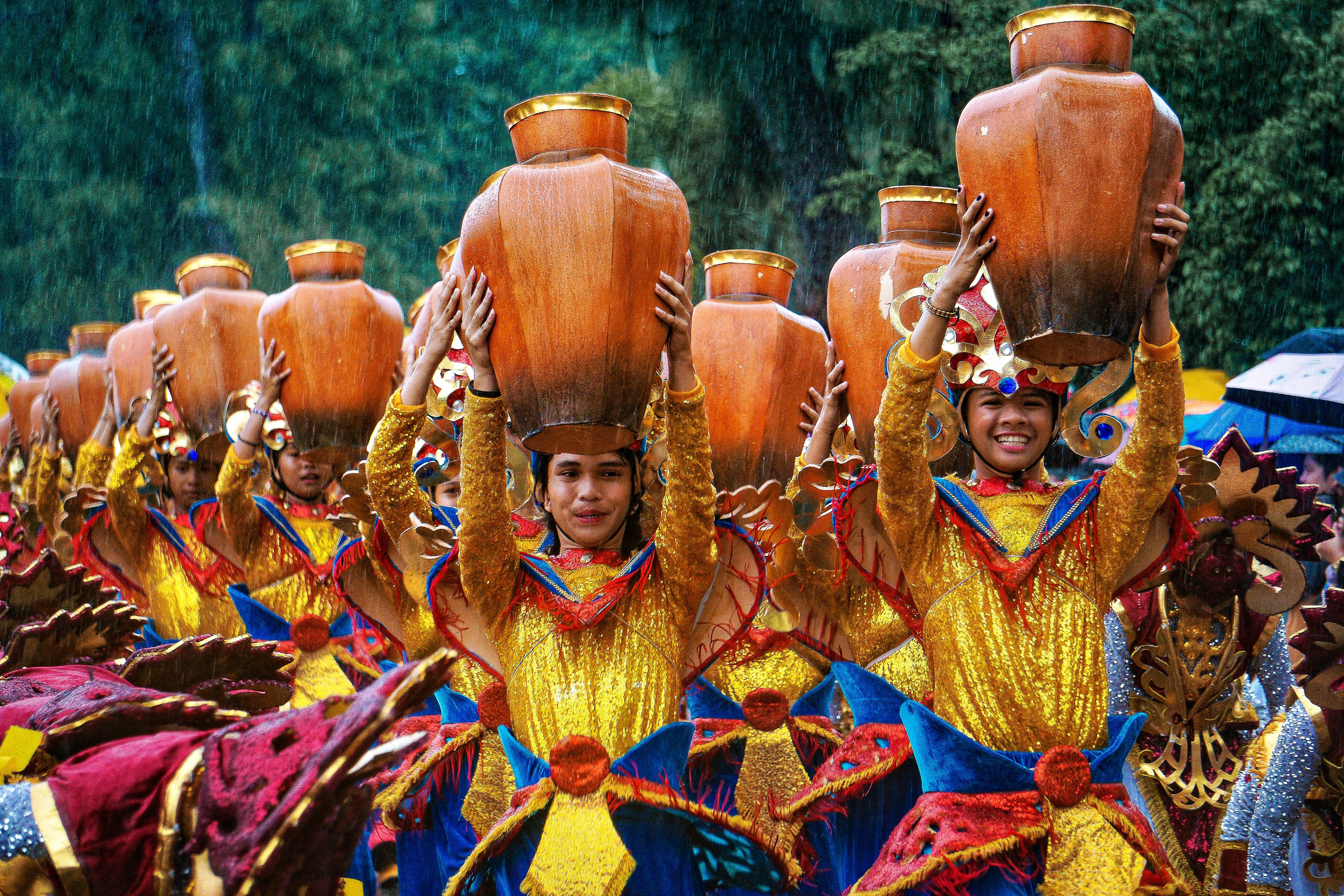
Karansa Festival dancers holding pots in their street dancing performance in 2024.

This is the pottery festival of Danao. It is in honor of St. Thomas of Villanova. The name of the festival is a Cebuano term that refers to an "expression of joy and happiness among potters after a hard day's work". The festival is primarily a happy and playful dancing and prancing activity in coordination with the rhythm of music, beating of the drums and occasional loud shouts. The dance has four basic steps, namely, swaying (kiay), shaking (karag and kurug) and juddering (karahay). It is celebrated annually every 3rd Sunday of September.

== Soli-soli ==
This is the weaving festival of San Francisco. It is in honor of St. Joseph. The festival's name refers to the local name for the Common Bulrush (Typha latifolia), a plant that is common in the town around Lake Danao and all throughout Pacijan Island. The Festival showcases the livelihood of the San Franciscohanons, which is weaving the Soli-soli grass into mats, decorations, handbags, pouches, and other handicrafts. There are three basic dance steps of the festival dance, namely, hands and arms sideward swaying, harvesting and cutting movement, and finally a weaving motion, which are all a mimesis of the process of weaving Soli-soli. It is celebrated every third Sunday of March, in line with the solemnity of St. Joseph, husband of Mary.

== Kinsan ==
This is the sea festival of Aloguinsan. It is in honor of St. Raphael the Archangel. It celebrates the Dotted Grouper (Epinephelus epistictus), known locally as Kinsan, which is an abundant fish in the town and an important source of livelihood for the town's fishermen. The festival is celebrated through lively dancing in the street and in the grandstand, as well as cooking contests for the best Kinsan dish in town. It is celebrated every 2nd Sunday of June.

== Binuyocan/Buyoc ==
This is the town fiesta of Malabuyoc. It is in honor of St. Nicholas of Tolentino. The name of the festival is derived from the Cebuano buyoc, which means to "bend down" or "bend over. According to a popular story, long ago, Malabuyoc grew plenty of fruit trees such as Mangoes, Lanzones, Cacaos, and many others. The fruit of the tree branches grew so big and plentiful that the trees bent down under their weight. Because of practically all the branches of the fruit trees bending over due to the over-abundance of fruit, the place came to be called "Buyoc", and eventually "Malabuyoc". The municipality of Malabuyoc launched the Binuyocan Festival on September 10, 2004. The festival is a celebration of the bountiful harvest of fruit in the town. It continues to be celebrated every September 10 every year.

== Humba ==
The Humba Festival is the food festival of Ronda. It is in honor of Our Lady of Sorrows. It replaced the Panginabuhi Festival as the official festival of the town. The festival celebrates the Humba dish, a Visayan braised pork dish that is the iconic delicacy of the town. During the Humba festival, dancers incorporate the Humba dish, as well as the ingredients of Humba in their dances. There are also Humba cooking contests to promote Humba and to determine the best Humba every year. It is celebrated around the September 14 or 15, in line with the feast of the Virgin Mary.

== Haladaya ==
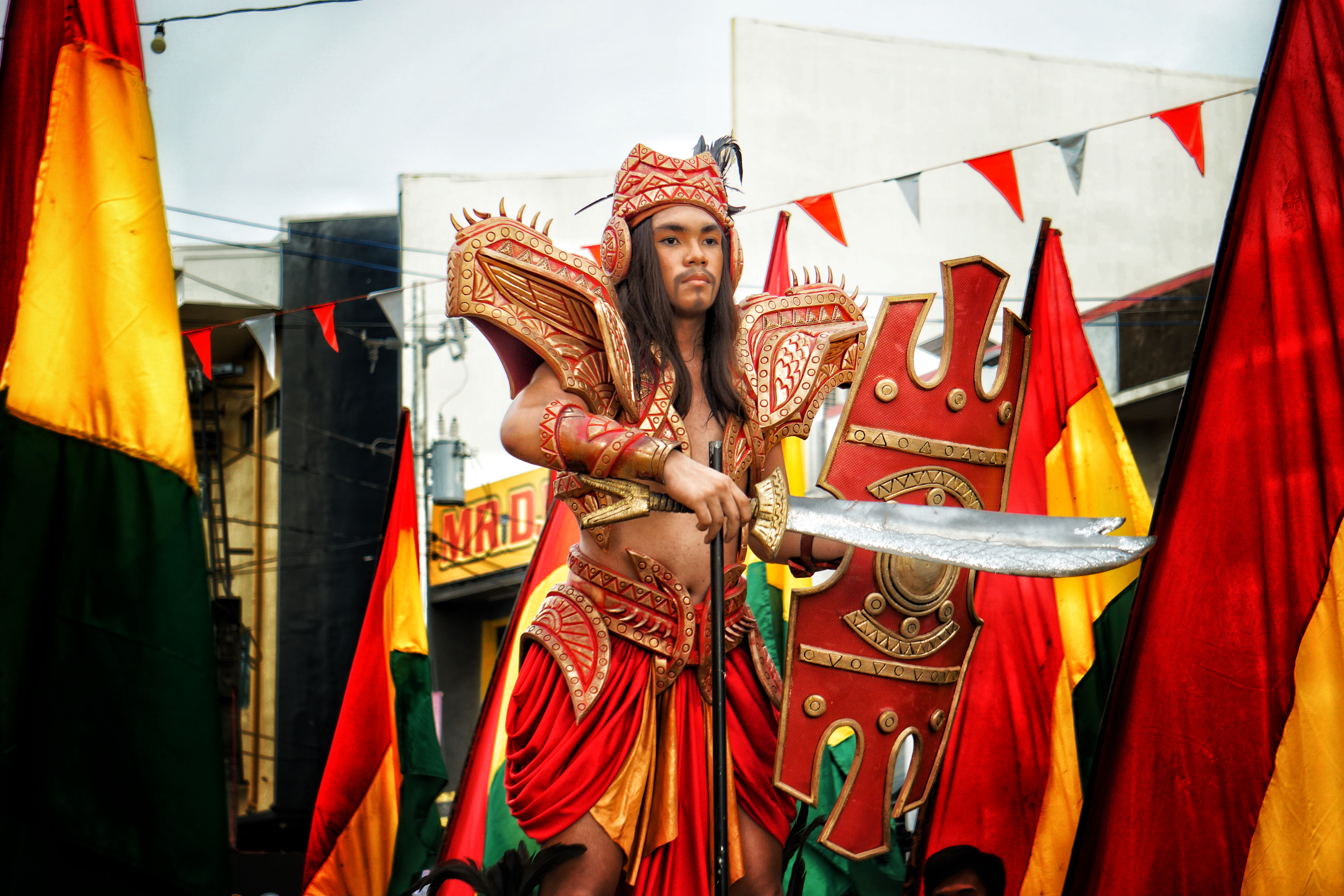
Datu Daya, the Chieftain of the Precolonial Kingdom of Kandaya during the Haladaya Festival of Daanbantayan, 2024.

This is the historical festival of Daanbantayan. It celebrates Datu Daya, the precolonial chieftain of the kingdom known as "Kandaya", which is now present-day Daanbantayan. The name of the festival is an exaltation to Datu Daya, translating to "all hail Daya". It is meant to be a celebration of the leadership and bravery of Datu Daya. Despite being a historical festival, it is also considered a religious festival in honor of St. Rose of Lima. It is celebrated every August 30, in line with the feast of the town's patron saint.

== Bahandi ==
This is the town fiesta of Alcantara. It is in honor of St. Augustine of Hippo. The name of the festival is the Cebuano word for "treasure". It is meant to be a thanksgiving for the treasures of Alcantara, which are its natural resources. It is celebrated on the August 27 to 28 in line with the feast of the patron saint of the town.

== Lapyahan ==
This is the sea festival of San Remigio. It is in honor of St. John of Nepomuk. The name of the festival is taken from the Cebuano term for "shorelines". It is a thanksgiving for the shoreline of the town, which is the longest in the province of Cebu, as well as the bounty of the sea. It is celebrated on May 16.

== Hinatdan ==
This is the town fiesta of Ginatilan. It is in honor of St. Gregory the Great. The festival's name Hinatdan is the Cebuano term for "getting things done". It is a celebration of the hardwork, faith, and resiliency of the Ginatilanons. It is celebrated around the 2nd week of March.

== Dinagat ==
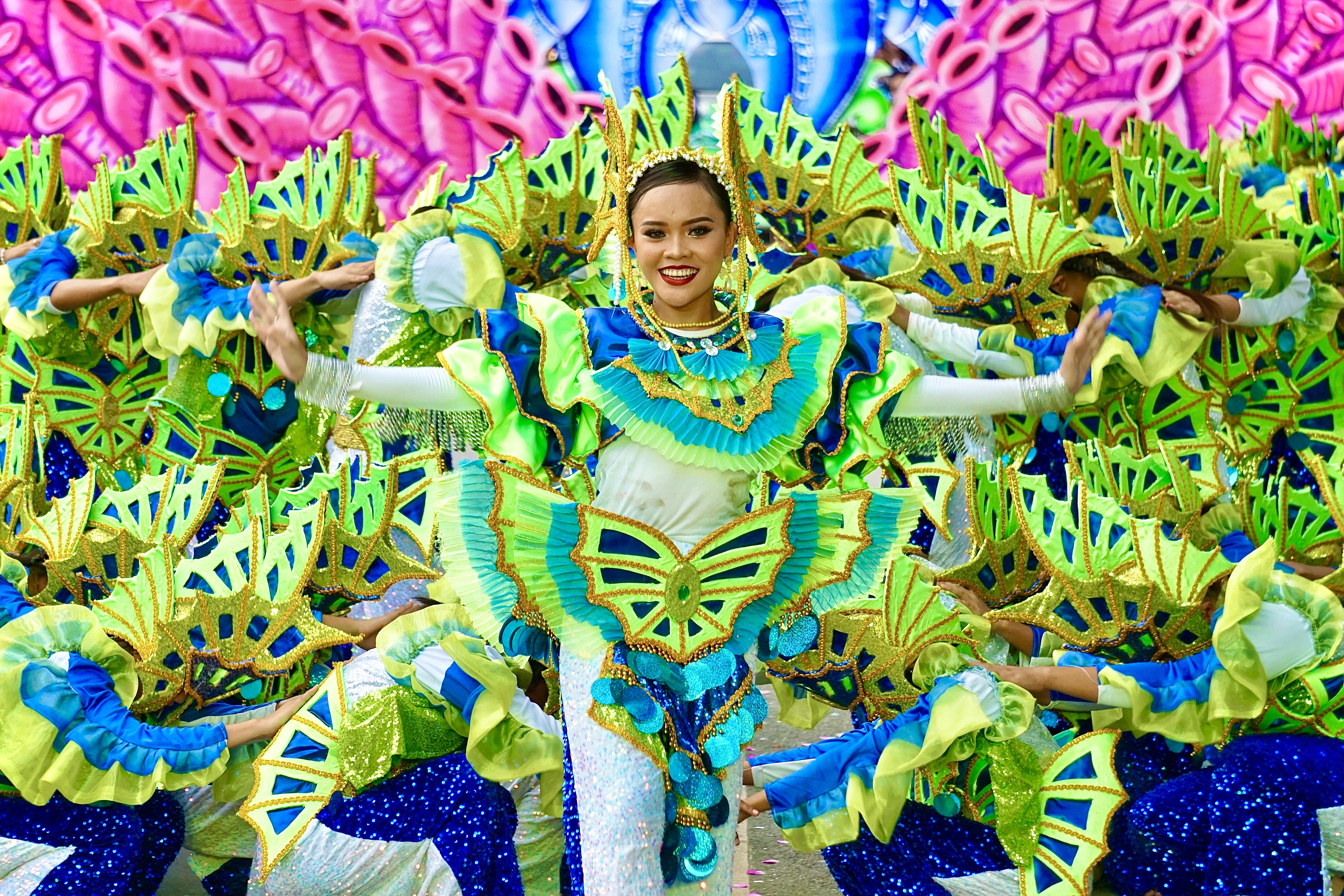
A Dinagat Festival queen together with dancers from her contingent in the Dinagat Festival 2024.

This is the sea festival of Cordova. It is in honor of St. Roch. The name of the festival is a Cebuano word "gathering from the sea" and is reference to a method of fishing by means of picking sea life from the shoreline for food. The festival celebrates the rich and bountiful sea life of Cordova. Dancers in the Dinagat festival incorporate sea life in their dances, especially moray eels, locally known as Bakasi, which are considered a delicacy in Cordova. This is also why the Dinagat festival is also referred to as the "Dinagat-Bakasi festival". It is celebrated on August 16.

== Kuyayang ==
This is the folk dance festival of the City of Bogo. It celebrates the Kuyayang, a Cebuano dance of courtship that immitates the movements of a Pondskater. It is in honor of St. Vincent Ferrer. The festival is a thanksgiving for the Graces from God and is a celebration of Bogohanon Culture and Identity. It is celebrated every May 26.

== Tuba ==
This is the town fiesta of Borbon. It is in honor of St. Sebastian. It celebrates the Tubâ, a Visayan coconut wine (also called coconut toddy) commonly found in the town. The festival is a thanksgiving for Tuba as a source of livelihood, as well as the local toddy industry. It is celebrated every January 20.

== Budbod Kabog ==
This is the food festival of Catmon. It is in honor of St. William the Hermit. The name of the festival is derived from Budbod, a type of rice cake or grain cake, made with Millet (known locally as Kabog) instead of the usual ingredient, rice. It is a festival about showing thanksgiving for the Budbod industry in the town. It is celebrated on February 10.

== Bisnok ==
This is the food festival of Dumanjug. It is in honor of St. Francis of Assisi. The festival's name is a portmanteau of the words Bisayang Manok, which is tradition Visayan roasted chicken, the local delicacy of the town. The dance of the festival is a mimesis of the process of chicken roasting, from the preparation to the actual cooking process. It is a celebration of thanksgiving for the roasted chicken industry in the town, which has helped put it on the map. It is celebrated on October 4.

== Katunggan ==
This is the sea festival of Tudela. It is in honor of the Immaculate Conception. The name of the festival is derived from the word Katunggan which is a collective term for Tungog which means "Mangroves". It is a celebration of thanksgiving for the Mangrove Forests of the town, which, not only provide shelter and nurseries for fish and other marine life, but also serve as a natural protection of the town against tides and weather. It is celebrated on the first two weeks of June.

== Que Alegre ==
This is the town fiesta of Alegria. It is in honor of St. Francis Xavier and St. Joseph the Worker. It replaced the Kawayan Festival as the Alegria's official town fiesta. The festival's name Que Alegre is a Spanish phrase meaning "How Joyful" and is meant to represent the joyful nature of Alegria. It is a celebration of thanksgiving for the abundance of graces from God bestowed upon Alegria, such as bamboo, smiling faces and family and friendships that last a lifetime. It is celebrated annually on December 2–3.

== Sanggi ==
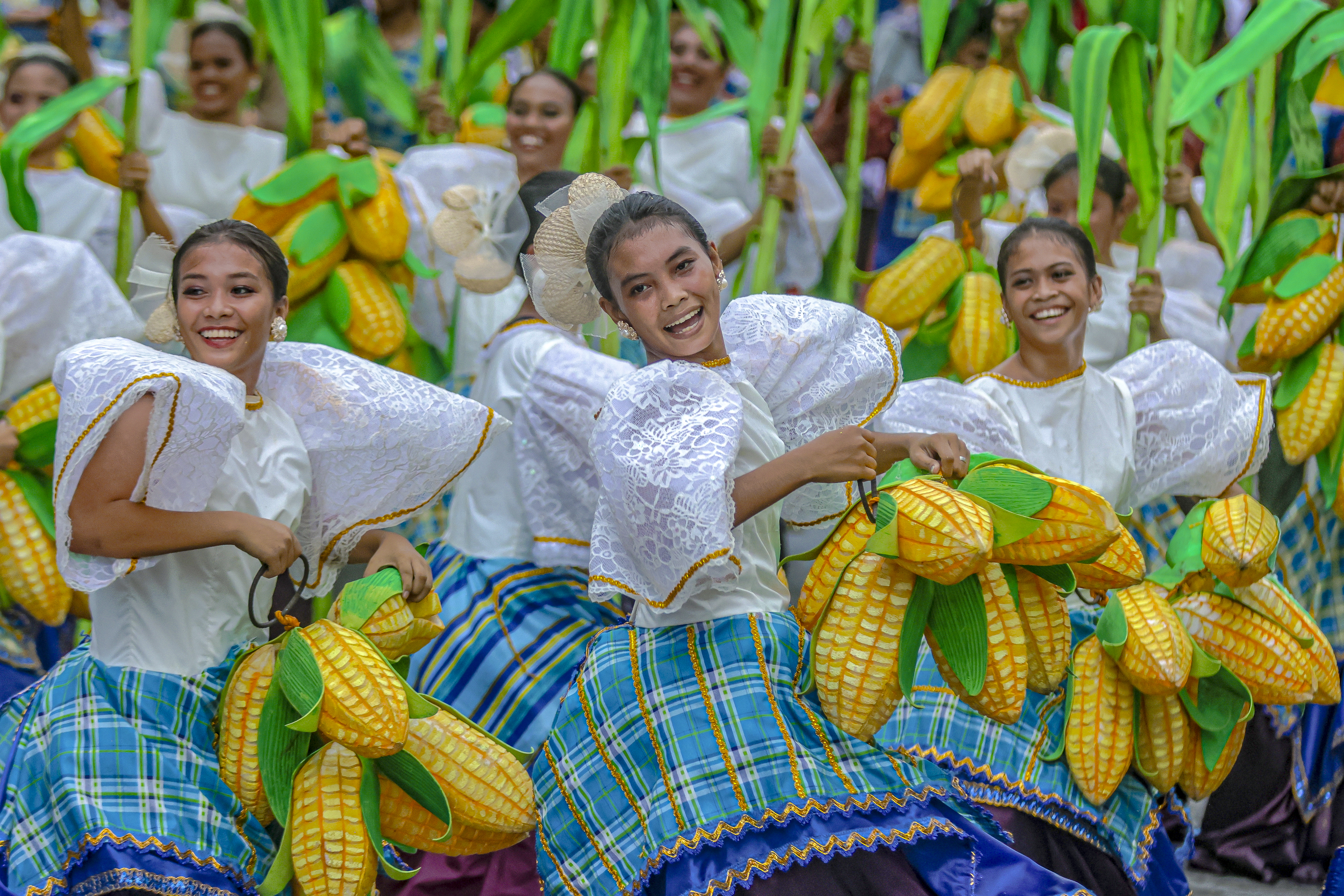
Sanggi Festival Dancers in their Street Dancing Performance in Pasigarbo sa Sugbo 2024.

This is the harvest festival of Tabogon. It is in honor of St. Isidore the Farmer. The festival's name Sanggi is the Cebuano term for the act of "harvesting corn". The festival is a dedication to the hard work of farmers that plow the fields with the help of water buffalos. It is a celebration of thanksgiving for the bountiful corn harvest of the town. It is celebrated on May 20.

== Dagayday ==
This is the town fiesta of Samboan. It is in honor of St. Michael the Archangel. It replaced the Sak-sak Festival as the official festival of the town. The name of the festival is the Cebuano word for "Waterfalls". It is a thanksgiving for the natural resources of the town, which are its waterfalls. It is celebrated on September 28 to 29 to coincide with the feast of the archangels.

== Ani-anihan ==
This is the harvest festival of Tabuelan. It is in honor of St. John the Baptist. The festival's name is a Cebuano term that is a reference to the act of "harvesting". It is a celebration of thanksgiving for the bountiful harvest of the town. It is celebrated on June 24.

== Pamugsay ==
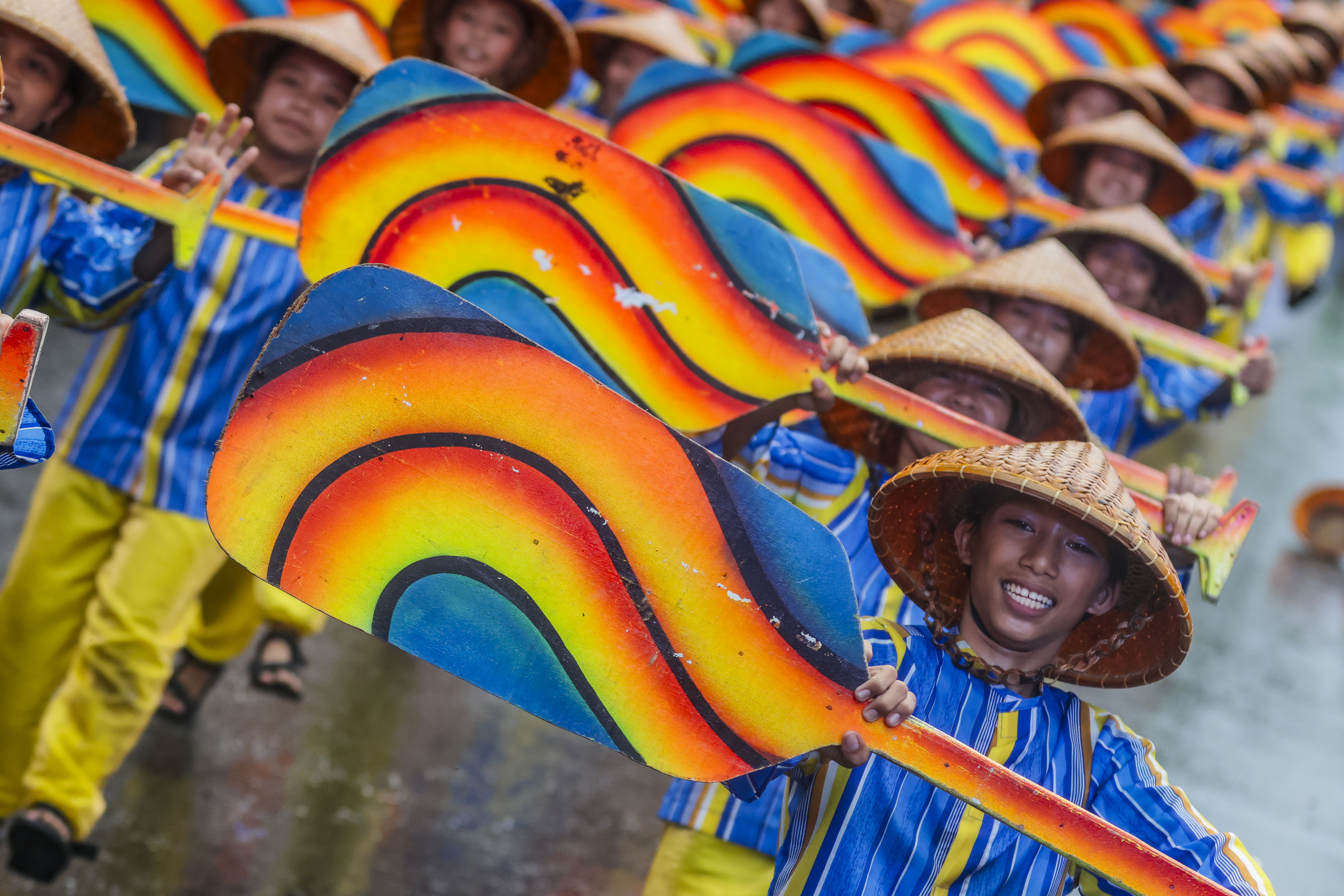
Pamugsay Festival Dancers in their Street Dancing Performance in Pasigarbo sa Sugbo 2024.

This is the sea festival of Pilar. It is in honor of St. Francis Xavier. The name of the festival is a Cebuano term for "the act of paddling". The festival celebrates the rich and bountiful sea life of Pilar. It is celebrated annually on December 2.

== Kumbira ==
This is the food festival of Compostela. It is in honor of St. James the Great. It replaced the Queseo Festival as the official town fiesta. The reason for the town's change of festival was to showcase other dishes found in Compostela, aside from their iconic Carabao White Cheese. It is a celebration of the culinary diversity of the town. It is celebrated on July 25.

== Panumod ==
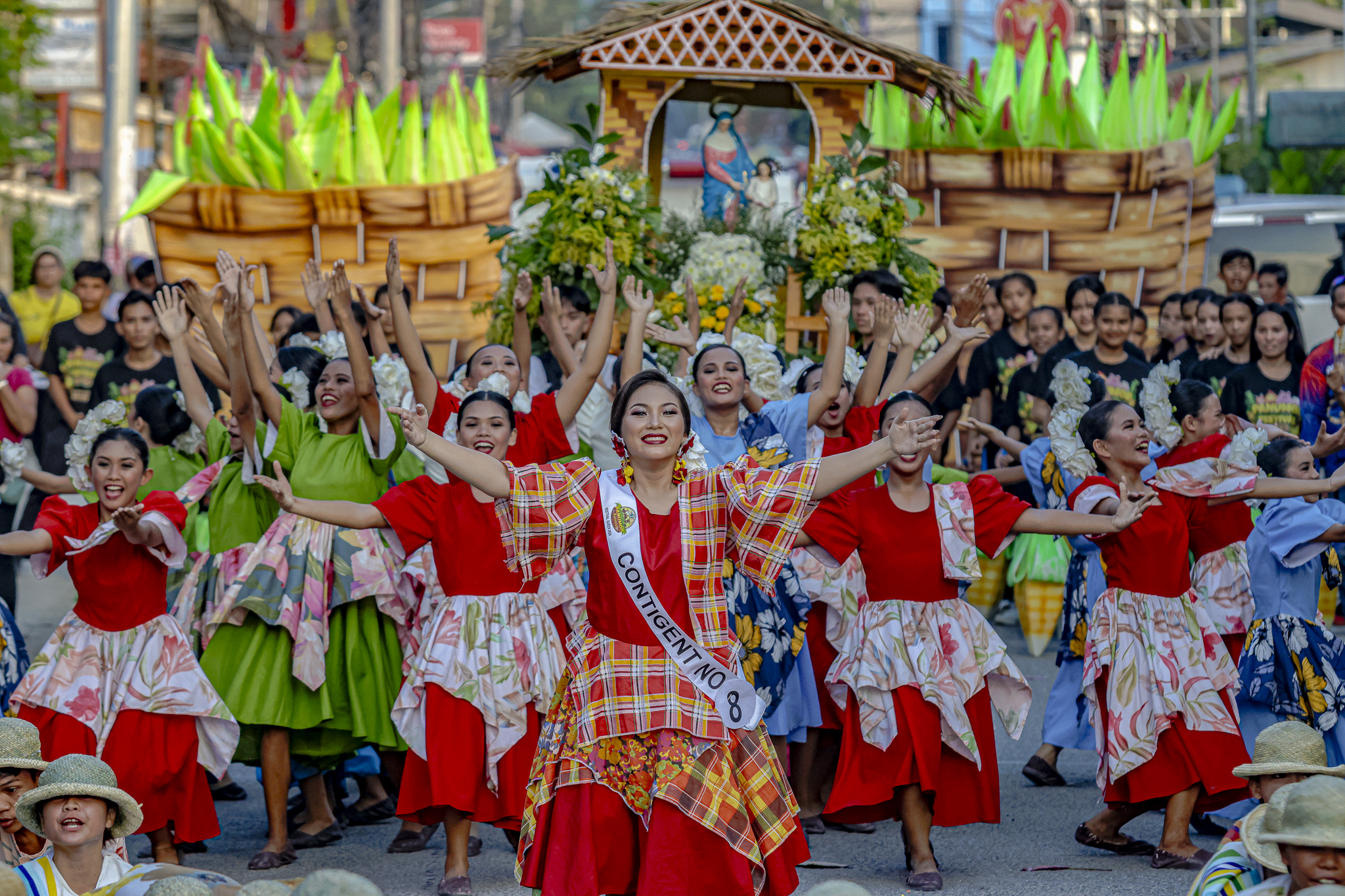
Panumod Festival dancers during Barili town fiesta.

This is the farm animal festival of Barili. It is in honor of St. Anne. It replaced the Kaumahan Festival as the official festival of the town. The festival's name is a Cebuano term for "livestock". Barili is considered to be the largest producer of livestock in the province. The town's public market, the Mantalongon Public Market is where most of the town's livestock and domestic animals are sold. It is a celebration of thanksgiving for the bountiful livestock of the town. It is celebrated on July 26.

== Sikoy-sikoy ==
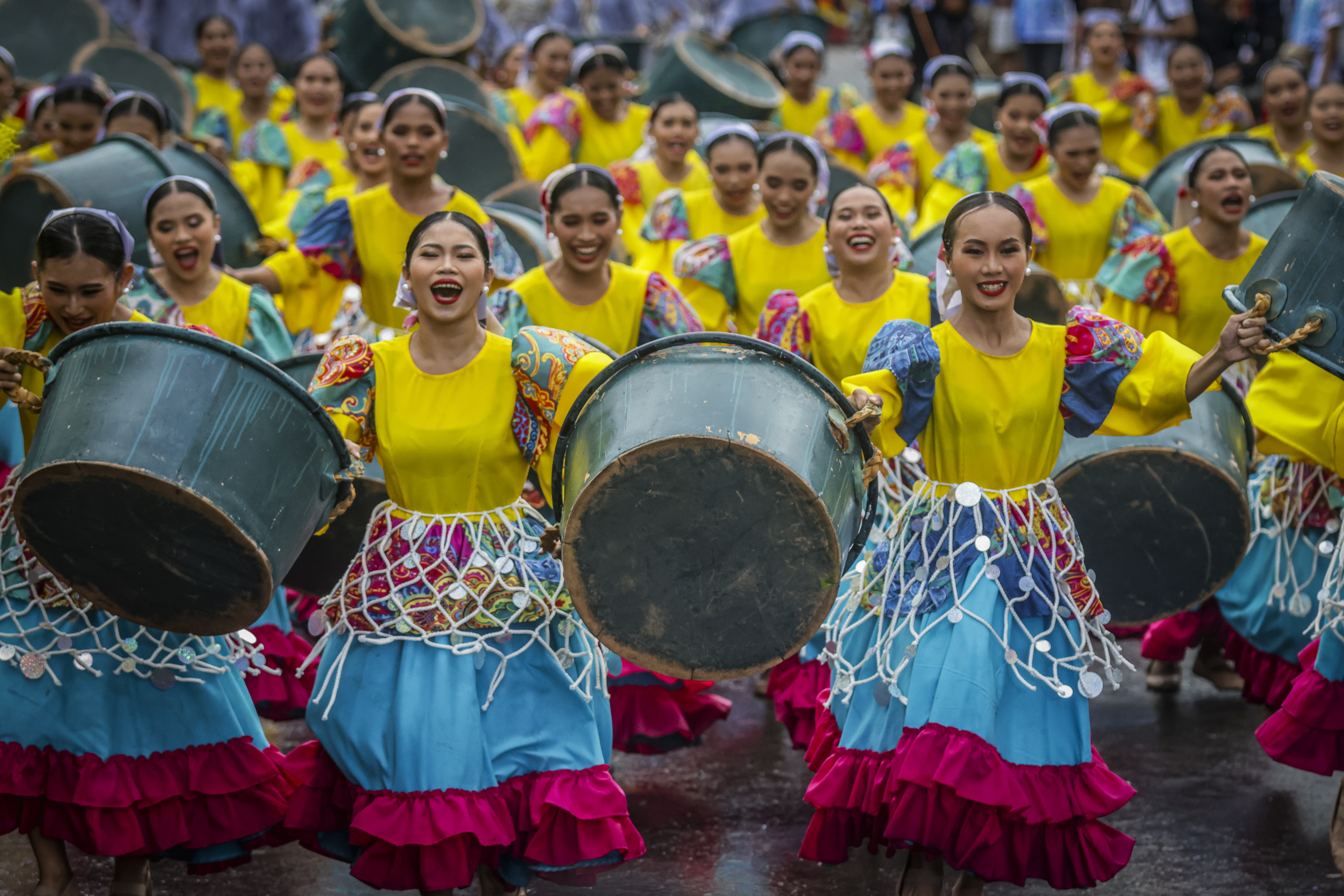
Sikoy-Sikoy Festival dancers in their Street Dancing in Pasigarbo sa Sugbo 2024.

This is the sea festival of San Fernando. It is in honor of St. Isidore the Farmer. The name of the festival is a Cebuano word Sikoy, which is a fishing method using nets done during rough tides. The festival celebrates the rich and bountiful sea life of San Fernando, which are considered blessings of God's love to the town. It is celebrated every November 17–21.

== Bolho ==
This is the town fiesta of Boljoon. It is in honor of Our Lady of the Patronage. The name of the festival is a reference to the origin of the name of the town which is a Cebuano term referring to a large land mass cavity surrounded by mountains. This valley is believed to have been brought about by the sudden collapse of a mountain range. It is a celebration of the way of life of the Boljo-anons. It is celebrated around November 13, in line with the feast of the Virgin Mary.
