= Alegría (surname) =

Alegría is a Spanish surname native of the Basque Country, Spain. While some authors place the origin of this lineage in Navarre and Vitoria, most writers take as true that its origin comes from the natives of Alegría de Oria, district of Tolosa, in the province of Guipuzkoa.

Branches from the very old houses of the Basque Country and Navarre went to other places in Spain, as some of their knights went to Andalusia to serve the Catholic Monarchs in the conquest of Granada. Others went to Murcia and settled in the town of Totana. The surname then spread to Latin America mostly coming from Navarra.

Notable people with the surname include:

- Alexander Alegría (born 1992), Spanish footballer
- Ciro Alegría (1909–1967), Peruvian journalist, novelist and politician
- Claribel Alegría (1924–2018), Nicaraguan writer
- Fernando Alegría (1918–2005), Chilean author, diplomat, and academic
- Jannet Alegría (born 1987), Mexican taekwondo practitioner
- Linda Lizeth Caicedo Alegría (born 2005), Colombian footballer
- Luis Alegría (born 1980), Chilean footballer
- María Alegria Continente (born 1977), Spanish politician
- Mario Alegría, Peruvian politician
- Michael López-Alegría, Spanish-American astronaut
- Miguel José de Azanza Alegría (1745–1826), Duke of Santa Fe and Viceroy of New Spain
- Pedro Alegría, Dominican Republic politician
- Raymundo Polanco-Alegría (born 1920s), Dominican Air Force military and key figure in the Rebellion of the Pilots; businessman
- Rosa Luz Alegría (born 1949), Mexican physicist
- Sigrid Alegría (born 1974), Chilean actress
