= Alegria oil field =

Oil and natural gas field in Alegria, Cebu, Philippines

- Country: Philippines
- Region: Central Visayas
- Location: Alegria, Cebu
- Offshore/onshore: Onshore
- Coordinates: 09°42′43.6″N 123°21′41.8″E
- Operator: China International Mining Petroleum Co. Ltd.
- Service contractors: China International Mining Petroleum Co. Ltd.

Field history
- Start of development: 2014
- Start of production: 2018

Production
- Peak of production (oil): 180 barrels per day (~9,000 t/a)
- Estimated oil in place: 27.93 million barrels (~3.810×10^{6} t)
- Estimated gas in place: 9.42×10^{9} cu ft (267×10^{6} m^{3})
- Producing formations: Alegria Anticline

The Alegria oil and gas field is an oil and natural gas field in the town of Alegria, Cebu, Philippines.

== Site ==
The Alegria oil field is situated in the barangay of Montpeller in Alegria, Cebu. It is an onshore oil field. The field covers 197,000 hectares (490,000 acres) while the production area is 42,749 hectares (105,640 acres).

== History ==
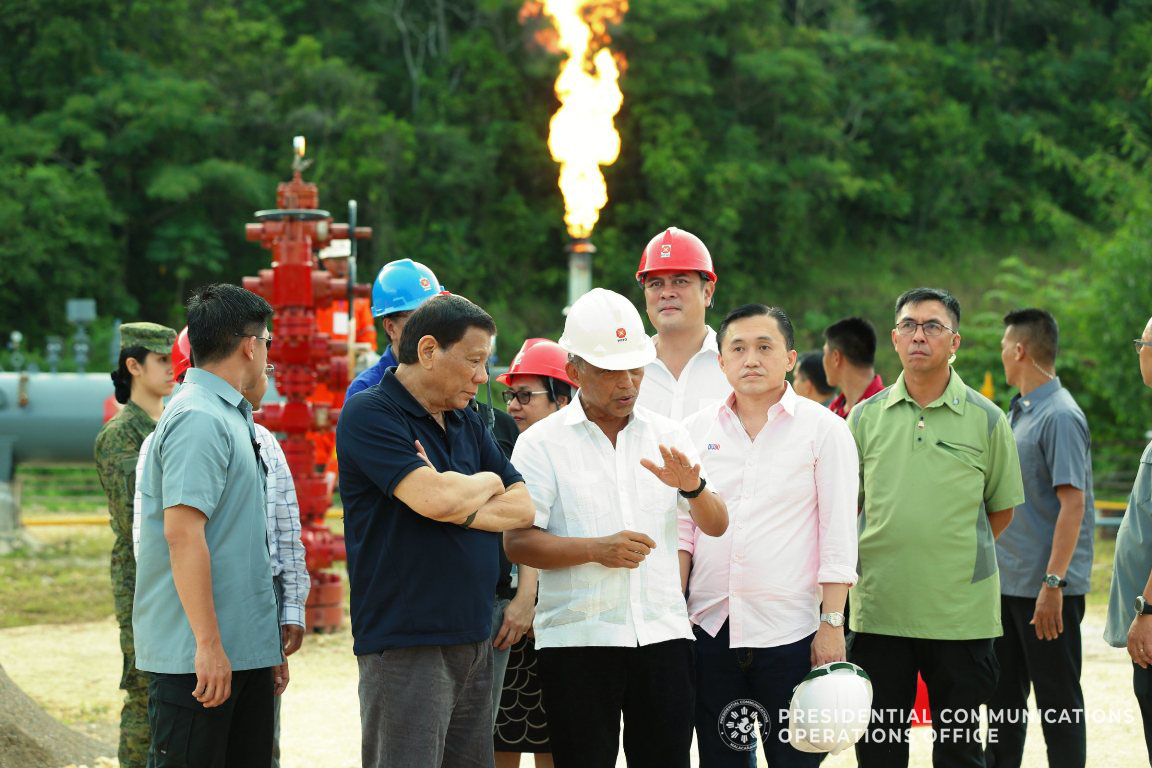
President Rodrigo Duterte discusses matters with Energy Secretary Alfonso Cusi on the sidelines of the oil and gas production ceremonial commencement on May 19, 2018.

In 2009, China International Mining Petroleum Co. Ltd. (CIMP Co. Ltd.) was granted Petroleum Service Contract No. 49 allowing the firm to explore and drill oil in Alegria. Six other firms had considered conducting oil exploration in Alegria. On August 28, 2014, CIMP Co. Ltd. became the first firm to commence oil exploration in Alegria. The operation, which was done to determine if the town had commercially viable oil reserve, was expected to last three to four months.

CIMP Co. Ltd. and the Philippine Department of Energy later established that the area contained commercial quantities of natural gas when they discovered an oil accumulation in the adjacent hydrocarbon traps within the underground area of the town of Alegria, Cebu. The commercial viability of the field was formally declared when the two parties signed a Joint Declaration of Commerciality on March 14, 2018.

Sometime in 2018, CIMP Co. Ltd. signed a sales and purchase agreement with Tom's Power Petroleum Distributor Inc.. By early May 2018, production tests has been made with two wells already producing 180 barrels per day.

== Production ==
According to the Philippine Department of Energy, oil produced from the Alegria field will only be made available for the Philippine market. Bunker oil produced from the field may be used for local refineries.

=== Estimate ===
Before any extraction begun, it was estimated that the Alegria oil field had an oil reserve of 27.93 million barrels with a probable production recovery of 3.35 million barrels. The Alegria field is also a natural gas field hosting an estimated 9.42 billion cubic feet of natural gas. It is estimated that the reserves will last until 2037.

== See also ==
- Energy in the Philippines
