= Algeria, West Virginia =

Unincorporated community in West Virginia, United States

Algeria
- Unincorporated community
- Location within the state of West Virginia Algeria (the United States)
- Coordinates: 39°25′05″N 81°03′09″W
- Country: United States
- State: West Virginia
- County: Pleasants
- Elevation: 778 ft (237 m)
- Time zone: UTC-5 (Eastern (EST))
  - Summer (DST): UTC-4 (EDT)
- GNIS ID: 1678485

Algeria is an unincorporated community in Pleasants County, West Virginia, United States. The village is located along Big Run, a branch of Middle Island Creek, where County Route 7, Arvilla Road, meets Desert Road, about two miles southeast of Arvilla. A U.S. Post Office was established there in 1894, and continued to 1910, when the post office was discontinued, and the mail redirected to Wasp.
