= Mario Alegría =

Peruvian politician and a Congressman

Mario Arturo Alegría Pastor is a Peruvian politician and a Congressman representing the La Libertad for the 2006–2011 term. Alegría belongs to the Peruvian Aprista Party.
