= Wasp, Pleasants County, West Virginia =

Wasp
- Unincorporated community
- Location within the state of West Virginia Wasp (the United States)
- Coordinates: 39°25′48″N 81°2′38″W
- Country: United States
- State: West Virginia
- County: Pleasants
- Elevation: 787 ft (240 m)
- Time zone: UTC-5 (Eastern (EST))
  - Summer (DST): UTC-4 (EDT)
- GNIS ID: 1555924

Wasp is an unincorporated community in Pleasants County, West Virginia, United States. The Wasp post office no longer exists.
