= El Djazaïr =

Arabic Language Newspaper

El Djazaïr (Arabic: الجزائر, meaning 'Algeria' or 'Algiers') is an Arabic-language newspaper in Algeria. In April 2008 the paper launched its Francophone edition, named Algérie-Edition.
