= Alegria, Cebu =

Municipality in Cebu, Philippines

Alegria
- Municipality
- Municipality of Alegria
- Municipal Hall Saint Francis Xavier Parish Church Public Market

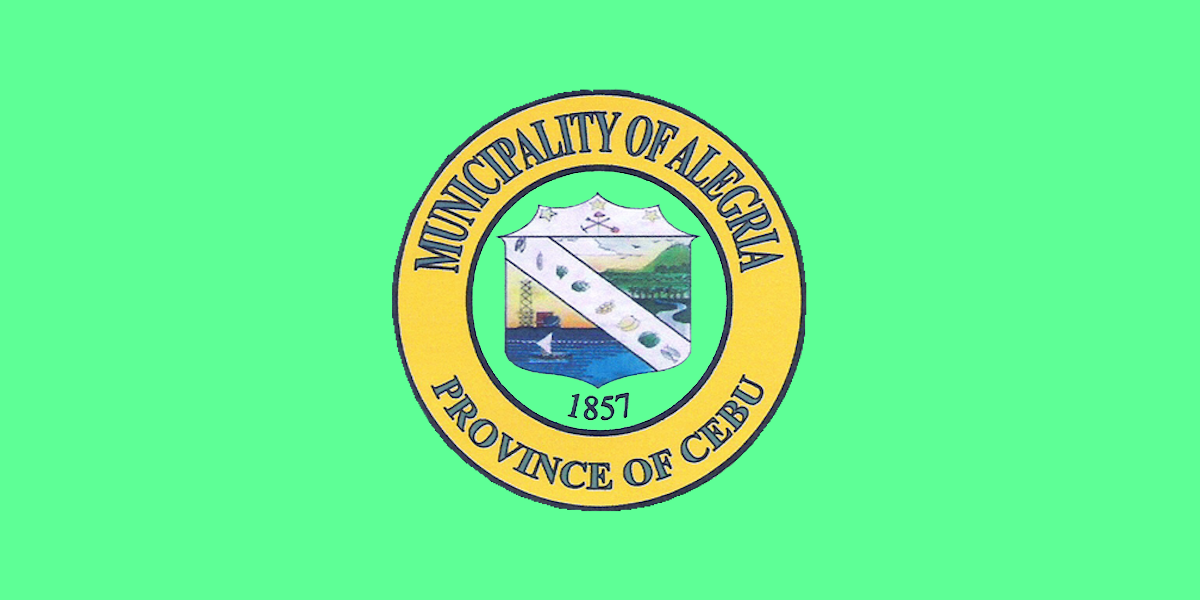
- Flag
- Anthem: Alegria kong mahal English: My beloved Alegria
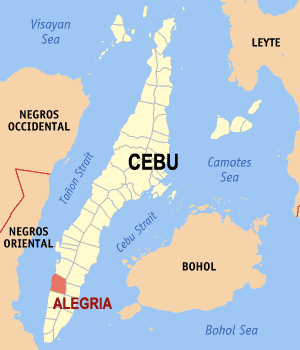
- Map of Cebu with Alegria highlighted
- Interactive map of Alegria
- Location within the Philippines
- Coordinates: 9°43′28″N 123°20′25″E
- Country: Philippines
- Region: Central Visayas
- Province: Cebu
- District: 7th district
- Founded: 3 April 1850
- Barangays: 9 (see Barangays)

Government
  - Type: Sangguniang Bayan
  - Mayor: Gilberto F. Magallon
  - Vice Mayor: Verna V. Magallon
  - Representative: Peter John D. Calderon
  - Municipal Council: Members: Justino L. Libron; German L. Mejares Jr.; Alex L. Lobino; Jerome M. Rodriguez; Vicente G. Aller; Dennis C. Guardiario; Eleuteria L. Lindio; Joseph L. Redula
  - Electorate: 17,964 voters (2025)

Area
  - Total: 89.49 km^{2} (34.55 sq mi)
- Elevation: 188 m (617 ft)
- Highest elevation: 709 m (2,326 ft)
- Lowest elevation: 0 m (0 ft)

Population (2024 census)
  - Total: 26,520
  - Density: 296.3/km^{2} (767.5/sq mi)
  - Households: 6,245

Economy
  - Income class: 3rd municipal income class
  - Poverty incidence: 30.72% (2023)
  - Revenue: ₱ 931.3 million (2024)
  - Assets: ₱ 1,212 million (2024)
  - Expenditure: ₱ 99.59 million (2024)
  - Liabilities: ₱ 172 million (2024)

Service provider
  - Electricity: Cebu 1 Electric Cooperative (CEBECO 1)
- Time zone: UTC+8 (PST)
- ZIP code: 6030
- PSGC: 072203000
- IDD : area code: +63 (0)32
- Native languages: Cebuano; Tagalog

Alegria, officially the Municipality of Alegria (Cebuano: Lungsod sa Alegria; Tagalog: Bayan ng Alegria), is a municipality in the province of Cebu, Philippines. According to the 2024 census, it has a population of 26,520 people.

It is home of the first onshore oil field in the Philippines, the Alegria Oil Field.

== History ==
Timeline:

- Pre-1850: Native tribe; then a Spanish-era barrio called Tuburan after the spring (tubod) located at sitio Tubig (Santa Rosa) in the poblacion.
- 31 January 1850: Leaders of Tuburan ask Governor of Cebu to support their petition for civil separation from mother town (matriz) Malabuyoc.
- 4 February: Malabuyoc leaders send letter of support for said petition. Tuburan had a church made of tabique de pampango, a convent and tribunal of light materials, two rubble watchtowers and 410½ tributos (one family = 1 tribute; unmarried adult = ½ tribute).
- 15 February: Petition goes to the Civil Administrator and Commanding General of the Visayas then sent to Superior Government in Manila.
- 31 March: Assessor General recommends approval of said petition.
- 3 April: Captain and Governor-General of the Philippine Islands (Antonio María Blanco) approves establishment of Tuburan as a town.
- 24 August: Governor of Cebu recommends changing the town's name to avoid confusing it with similarly named barrios in Balamban and Bogo.
- 25 September: Captain and Governor-General of the Philippines (Antonio de Urbistondo y Eguía) issues order changing the town's name to Alegria.

Establishment of parish:

- 9 August 1854: The Padre Cura of Malabuyoc, Lucas Clavesillas de la Soledad recommends to the Bishop of Cebu (Romualdo Jimeno Ballesteros, O.P.) the creation of Alegria as a parish.
- 17 September: Governor of Cebu proposes separating barrio Guiuanon (Madridejos) from Badian and adding it to Alegria to form a new parish territory.
- 31 October: Bishop of Cebu supports creation of said territory.
- 10 November: Bishop informs Governor of Cebu that Badian does not object to creation of a new parish and separation of Guiuanon.
- 21 February 1856: Petition for said separation and the creation of new parish territory received by the Minister of Royal Treasury in Manila.
- 27 February: Governor of Cebu asks the Captain and Governor-General to create said parish.
- 3 July: The town of Alegria created as a parish. Tributes: 781 (Poblacion - 521½, Guiuanon - 259½)
- 13 March 1857: Parish of Alegria Canonically erected. Titular Saint: St. Francis Xavier, Feast 3 December (Secondary Patron: St. Joseph).

== Geography ==
Cebu mountain landscape at Brgy. Compostela

Alegria is bordered to the north by the town of Badian, to the west is the Tañon Strait, to the east are the towns of Dalaguete and Alcoy, and to the south is the town of Malabuyoc. It is 131 kilometres (81 mi) from Cebu City.

Alegria is one of the eight municipalities comprising the 7th Congressional District Cebu Province.

=== Barangays ===
Alegria is politically subdivided into 9 barangays. Each barangay consists of puroks and some have sitios.

PSGC	Barangay	Population			±% p.a.	
		2024		2010		
072203001	Compostela	5.7%	1,510	1,557	▾	−0.21%
072203002	Guadalupe	9.8%	2,606	2,598	▴	0.02%
072203003	Legaspi	6.4%	1,694	1,652	▴	0.17%
072203004	Lepanto	7.9%	2,102	2,143	▾	−0.13%
072203005	Madridejos	19.4%	5,141	4,459	▴	0.98%
072203006	Montpeller	5.3%	1,408	1,315	▴	0.47%
072203007	Poblacion	9.2%	2,450	2,255	▴	0.57%
072203008	Santa Filomena	12.0%	3,194	3,139	▴	0.12%
072203009	Valencia	12.0%	3,195	2,954	▴	0.54%
	Total		26,520	22,072	▴	1.27%

=== Climate ===
Climate data for Alegria, Cebu
Month	Jan	Feb	Mar	Apr	May	Jun	Jul	Aug	Sep	Oct	Nov	Dec	Year
Mean daily maximum °C (°F)	29 (84)	29 (84)	30 (86)	32 (90)	31 (88)	30 (86)	30 (86)	30 (86)	30 (86)	29 (84)	29 (84)	29 (84)	30 (86)
Mean daily minimum °C (°F)	23 (73)	23 (73)	23 (73)	24 (75)	25 (77)	25 (77)	24 (75)	24 (75)	24 (75)	24 (75)	24 (75)	23 (73)	24 (75)
Average precipitation mm (inches)	35 (1.4)	28 (1.1)	38 (1.5)	51 (2.0)	125 (4.9)	195 (7.7)	194 (7.6)	173 (6.8)	180 (7.1)	192 (7.6)	121 (4.8)	64 (2.5)	1,396 (55)
Average rainy days	9.2	8.2	9.9	11.3	22.5	27.3	28.0	27.2	27.1	26.9	19.7	12.7	230
Source: Meteoblue (Use with caution: this is modeled/calculated data, not measured locally.)

== Demographics ==
Population census of Alegria
Year	Pop.	±% p.a.
1903	9,579	—
1918	12,653	+1.87%
1939	13,303	+0.24%
1948	13,676	+0.31%
1960	12,817	−0.54%
1970	15,232	+1.74%
1975	14,928	−0.40%
1980	16,351	+1.84%
1990	18,253	+1.11%
1995	18,403	+0.15%
2000	20,677	+2.53%
2007	21,699	+0.67%
2010	22,072	+0.62%
2015	23,300	+1.04%
2020	25,620	+2.02%
2024	26,520	+0.83%
Source: Philippine Statistics Authority

== Economy ==
Poverty incidence of Alegria (%)

Source: Philippine Statistics Authority

The formal extraction of oil and gas reserves from the Alegria Oil Field Polyard-3 Well in Barangay Montpeller would generate numerous job opportunities and income for residents, neighboring towns and the entire Cebu province.

Extracted oil will be sold to power plants at US$70 per barrel with a current production of 200 to 300 barrels per day, as told by Country Manager Edgar Benedict Cutiongco of China International Mining and Petroleum Company Inc. (CIMP), the service contractor of the oil extraction project. The Municipal government will receive an 18% income share coming from the 60% allotted to the National Government, while 14% will go to Barangay Montpeller and 8% to the Provincial Government.

== Tourism ==
The municipality of Alegria launched the Kawayan Festival on 2 December 2006, in time for the annual town fiesta. Local contingents paraded the streets, and locally produced kawayan (bamboo) products were on display. Kawayan Festival has been part of the fiesta celebration in honor of Saint Francis Xavier since then.

There is also a plan to develop Alegria as the "Organic Vegetable Basket" in Cebu and in the Visayas region by its mayor, Verna Magallon.

== Education ==
The public schools in the town of Alegria are administered by one school district under the Schools Division of Cebu Province.

Elementary schools:

- Alangasil Elementary School — Sitio Alangasil, Madridejos
- Alegria Central Elementary School — Poblacion
- Anislag Primary School — Sitio Anislag, Guadalupe
- Balha-an Elementary School — Sitio Balha-an, Madridejos
- Cagay-an Primary School — Sitio Cagay-an, Lepanto
- Cambunoc Elementary School — Sitio Cambunoc, Santa Filomena
- Cangcalape Primary School — Sitio Cangcalape, Compostela
- Compostela Elementary School — Compostela
- Dugyan Primary School — Sitio Dugyan, Valencia
- Guadalupe Elementary School — Guadalupe
- Inghoy Elementary School — Sitio Inghoy, Valencia
- Legaspi Elementary School — Legaspi
- Lepanto Elementary School — Lepanto
- Libo Elementary School — Sitio Libo, Lepanto
- Lingatong Primary School — Sitio Lingatong, Guadalupe
- Madridejos Elementary School — Madridejos
- Mayana Elementary School — Sitio Mayana, Guadalupe
- Montpeller Elementary School — Montpeller
- Santa Filomena Elementary School — Santa Filomena
- Valencia Elementary School — Valencia

High schools:

- Inghoy National High School — Sitio Inghoy, Valencia
- Madridejos National High School — Madridejos
- Montpeller National High School — Montpeller
- Santa Filomena National High School — Santa Filomena

Private schools:

- Saint Peter Academy — Poblacion
- St. Francis School of Alegria — Santa Filomena

== See also ==
- Municipalities of the Philippines
- Legislative districts of Cebu
