= 2022 Cebu local elections =

Election in Cebu, Philippines in 2022

- Gubernatorial election
- May 9, 2022
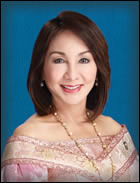

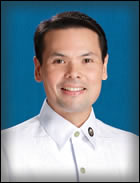
| Nominee | Gwendolyn Garcia | Ace Durano |
| Party | 1-Cebu | PPP |
| Running mate | Maria Teresa Heyrosa | Hilario Davide III |
| Popular vote | 1,478,436 | 341,455 |
| Percentage | 80.80% | 18.66% |
- A map showing the results of the Cebu gubernatorial election by municipality
Governor before election
Gwendolyn Garcia
1-Cebu
Elected Governor
Gwendolyn Garcia
1-Cebu
- Vice gubernatorial election
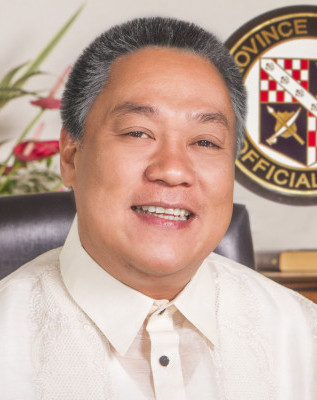

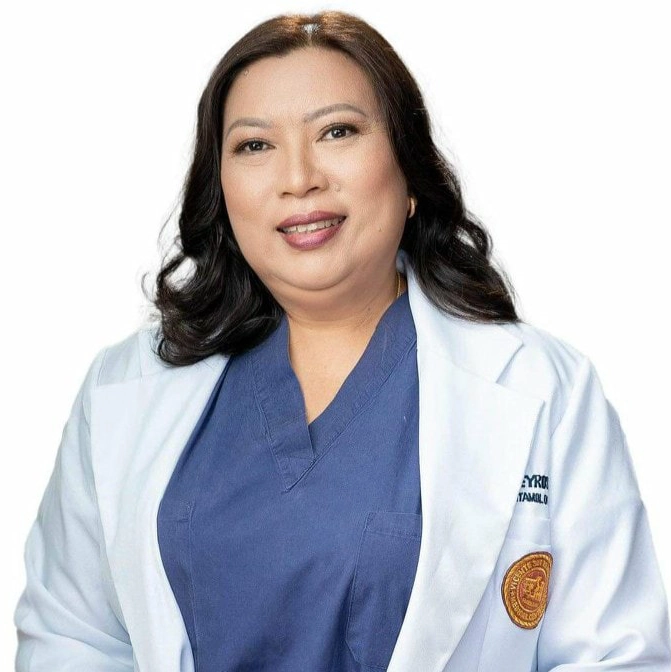
| Nominee | Hilario Davide III | Maria Teresa Heyrosa |
| Party | Liberal | 1-Cebu |
| Popular vote | 788,081 | 716,480 |
| Percentage | 50.60% | 46.00% |
- A map showing the results of the Cebu vice gubernatorial election by municipality
Vice Governor before election
Hilario Davide III
Liberal
Elected Vice Governor
Hilario Davide III
Liberal

Local elections were held in the province of Cebu on May 9, 2022, as part of the 2022 Philippine general election. Voters selected from among candidates for all local positions: a town mayor, vice mayor and town councilors, as well as members of the Sangguniang Panlalawigan, the vice governor, governor and representatives for the seven districts of Cebu (including two districts of Cebu City, the lone district of Lapu-Lapu City and the lone district of Mandaue City).

== Provincial elections ==
All incumbents are marked in Italics.

=== Governor ===
Joseph Felix Mari Durano, a former representative of Cebu's 5th congressional district and former secretary of Tourism, is challenging the re-election bid of incumbent governor Gwendolyn Garcia.

Cebu Gubernatorial election
| Party | Candidate | Votes | % |
|---|---|---|---|
| 1-Cebu | Gwendolyn Garcia | 1,478,436 | 80.80 |
| PPP | Joseph Felix Mari Durano | 341,455 | 18.66% |
| Independent | Nonito Magnanao | 9,812 | 0.63 |
| Total votes | | 1,829,703 | 100% |
| 1-Cebu hold | | | |

=== Vice governor ===
Incumbent vice governor Hilario Davide III is seeking for another term. He will be facing off against a newcomer in politics and doctor by profession, Maria Theresa Heyrosa.

Cebu Vice gubernatorial election
| Party | Candidate | Votes | % |
|---|---|---|---|
| Liberal | Hilario Davide III | 788,081 | 50.60 |
| 1-Cebu | Maria Theresa Heyrosa | 716,480 | 46.00 |
| PROMDI | John Enad | 52,784 | 3.38 |
| Total votes | | 1,557,345 | 100% |
| Liberal hold | | | |

=== Sangguniang Panlalawigan ===
| Party | Votes | % | Seats |
|---|---|---|---|
| One Cebu | 541,975 | 21.95 | 3 |
| Nacionalista Party | 409,013 | 16.57 | 2 |
| Partido Demokratiko Pilipino-Lakas ng Bayan | 361,538 | 14.64 | 2 |
| National Unity Party | 273,202 | 11.07 | 3 |
| Progressive Movement for the Devolution of Initiatives | 211,395 | 8.56 | 0 |
| Barug Alang sa Kauswagan ug Demokrasya | 192,740 | 7.81 | 0 |
| Partido Pilipino sa Pagbabago | 129,202 | 5.23 | 0 |
| Nationalist People's Coalition | 74,917 | 3.03 | 1 |
| Partido para sa Demokratikong Reporma | 34,965 | 1.42 | 0 |
| Independent | 240,074 | 9.72 | 2 |
| Ex officio seats | | | 3 |
| Total | 2,469,021 | 100.00 | 16 |

==== 1st District ====
- City: Carcar, Naga, Talisay
- Municipalities: Minglanilla, San Fernando, Sibonga

Incumbent board members Raul Bacaltos and Yolanda Daan are vying for a third term. Also running are Roger Cimafranca, Simplicio Danatil, and Ron Del Mar.

Cebu 1st District Sangguniang Panlalawigan election
| Party | Candidate | Votes | % |
|---|---|---|---|
| Nacionalista | Yolanda Daan | 231,416 | 43.03 |
| Nacionalista | Raul Bacaltos | 177,597 | 33.02 |
| PROMDI | Ron Del Mar | 105,892 | 19.69 |
| Independent | Roger Cimafranca | 12,802 | 2.38 |
| Independent | Simplicio Danatil | 9,997 | 1.85 |
| Total votes | | 537,704 | 100% |

==== 2nd District ====
- Municipalities: Alcoy, Argao, Boljoon, Dalaguete, Oslob, Samboan, Santander

Incumbent board members Edsel Galeos and Jose Mari Salvador are vying to succeed outgoing 2nd congressional district representative Wilfredo Caminero thereby making two seats up for grabs. Also running are Raymond Joseph Calderon, former Argao mayor Stanley Caminero, former DENR-7 regional director Isabelo Montejo, Robert Tambis, and Joseph Glenn Verano.

Cebu 2nd District Sangguniang Panlalawigan election
| Party | Candidate | Votes | % |
|---|---|---|---|
| Independent | Stanley Caminero | 69,158 | 30.87 |
| NUP | Raymond Joseph Calderon | 59,194 | 26.42 |
| 1-Cebu | Robert Tambis | 56,381 | 25.16 |
| Reporma | Isabelo Montejo | 34,965 | 15.60 |
| Independent | Joseph Glenn Verano | 4,307 | 1.92 |
| Total votes | | 224,005 | 100% |

==== 3rd District ====
- City: Toledo
- Municipalities: Aloguinsan, Asturias, Balamban, Barili, Pinamungajan, Tuburan

Incumbent board members John Ismael Borgonia and Victoria Corominas-Toribio are vying for a second and third term, respectively. Also running is incumbent Pinamungajan councilor Jephthah Yapha.

Cebu 3rd District Sangguniang Panlalawigan election
| Party | Candidate | Votes | % |
|---|---|---|---|
| 1-Cebu | John Ismael Borgonia | 132,514 | 37.42 |
| Independent | Victoria Corominas-Toribio | 116,024 | 32.77 |
| PROMDI | Jephthah Yapha | 105,503 | 29.79 |
| Total votes | | 354,041 | 100% |

==== 4th District ====
- City: Bogo
- Municipalities: Bantayan, Daanbantayan, Madridejos, Medellin, San Remigio, Santa Fe, Tabogon, Tabuelan

Incumbent board members Horacio Paul Franco and Kerrie Keane Shimura are vying for a third and second term, respectively. Also running are Jose Brainard Mayol and Nelson Mondigo.

Cebu 4th District Sangguniang Panlalawigan election
| Party | Candidate | Votes | % |
|---|---|---|---|
| NUP | Kerrie Keane Shimura | 129,307 | 37.67 |
| NUP | Horacio Paul Franco | 84,701 | 24.67 |
| PPP | Nelson Mondigo | 70,345 | 20.49 |
| PPP | Jose Brainard Mayol | 58,857 | 17.14 |
| Total votes | | 343,210 | 100% |

==== 5th District ====
- City: Danao
- Municipalities: Borbon, Carmen, Catmon, Compostela, Liloan, Pilar, Poro, San Francisco, Sogod, Tudela

Incumbent board member Miguel Antonio Magpale is term-limited and running as councilor in Danao. Incumbent board member Andrei Duterte is vying for a second term. Also running are incumbent Danao councilor Jerard Almendras, former board member Jude Thaddeus Sybico, and Michael Joseph Villamor.

Cebu 5th District Sangguniang Panlalawigan election
| Party | Candidate | Votes | % |
|---|---|---|---|
| 1-Cebu | Andrei Duterte | 156,085 | 32.20 |
| 1-Cebu | Michael Joseph Villamor | 135,769 | 28.01 |
| BAKUD | Jerard Almendras | 104,768 | 21.61 |
| BAKUD | Jude Thaddeus Sybico | 87,972 | 18.15 |
| Total votes | | 484,594 | 100% |

==== 6th District ====
- Municipalities: Consolacion, Cordova

Incumbent board members Thadeo Jovito Ouano and Glenn Anthony Soco are vying for a third and second term, respectively. Also running is Frederico Garcia.

Cebu 6th District Sangguniang Panlalawigan election
| Party | Candidate | Votes | % |
|---|---|---|---|
| PDP–Laban | Thadeo Jovito Ouano | 183,675 | 47.17 |
| PDP–Laban | Glenn Anthony Soco | 177,863 | 45.68 |
| Independent | Frederico Garcia | 27,786 | 7.13 |
| Total votes | | 389,324 | 100% |

==== 7th District ====
- Municipalities: Alcantara, Alegria, Badian, Dumanjug, Ginatilan, Malabuyoc, Moalboal, Ronda

Incumbent board member Christopher Baricuatro is term-limited. Incumbent board member Jerome Librando is vying for a third term. Baricuatro's father former Dumanjug mayor Cesar Baricuatro is running.

Cebu 7th District Sangguniang Panlalawigan election
| Party | Candidate | Votes | % |
|---|---|---|---|
| NPC | Jerome Librando | 74,917 | 55.02 |
| 1-Cebu | Cesar Baricuatro | 61,226 | 44.97 |
| Total votes | | 136,143 | 100% |

== Congressional elections ==
=== 1st District ===
Incumbent mayor of Talisay City Gerald Anthony Gullas Jr. initially sought to return as representative of Cebu's 1st congressional district. On November 14, he withdrew his candidacy to swap with his wife, Rhea Gullas, who eyed to succeed him as mayor.

2022 Philippine House of Representatives election at Cebu's 1st District
| Party | Candidate | Votes | % |
|---|---|---|---|
| Nacionalista | Rhea Gullas | 288,131 | 100% |
| Total votes | | 288,131 | 100% |
| Nacionalista hold | | | |

=== 2nd District ===
Incumbent representative Wilfredo Caminero is term-limited. Fellow board members Edsel Galeos and Jose Mari Salvador will be competing to succeed Caminero along with Leony Gregremosa of Partido Federal ng Pilipinas.

2022 Philippine House of Representatives election in Cebu's 2nd District
| Party | Candidate | Votes | % |
|---|---|---|---|
| PDP–Laban | Edsel Galeos | 73,122 | 51.73% |
| NUP | Jose Mari Salvador | 66,999 | 47.40% |
| PFP | Leony Gregremosa | 1,236 | 0.87% |
| Total votes | | 141,357 | 100% |

=== 3rd District ===
Incumbent representative Pablo John Garcia is vying for a second term. He is running unopposed after Anthony Pono of PROMDI withdrew his candidacy on November 15.

2022 Philippine House of Representatives election in Cebu's 3rd District
| Party | Candidate | Votes | % |
|---|---|---|---|
| NUP | Pablo John Garcia | 201,530 | 100% |
| Total votes | | 201,530 | 100% |

=== 4th District ===
Incumbent representative Janice Salimbangon is vying for a second term. She is running against former representative and incumbent ex officio board member Celestino Martinez III.

2022 Philippine House of Representatives election in Cebu's 4th District
| Party | Candidate | Votes | % |
|---|---|---|---|
| 1-Cebu | Janice Salimbangon | 163,913 | 61.13% |
| PPP | Celestino Martinez III | 102,020 | 38.05% |
| Independent | Salvador Cariaga | 2,223 | 0.83% |
| Total votes | | 268,156 | 100% |

=== 5th District ===
Incumbent representative Vincent Franco Frasco is vying for a second term. He is running against former representative Ramon Durano VI.

2022 Philippine House of Representatives election in Cebu's 5th District
| Party | Candidate | Votes | % |
|---|---|---|---|
| NUP | Vincent Franco Frasco | 222,288 | 67.18% |
| PPP | Ramon Durano VI | 108,596 | 32.82% |
| Total votes | | 330,884 | 100% |

=== 6th District ===
Incumbent representative Emmarie Ouano-Dizon is vying to become the first representative of the newly created lone district of Mandaue City thereby making the 6th district an open seat. Five candidates will compete for the seat including Daphne Lagon, wife of incumbent Ako Bisaya representative Sonny Lagon.

2022 Philippine House of Representatives election in Cebu's 6th District
| Party | Candidate | Votes | % |
|---|---|---|---|
| Lakas | Daphne Lagon | 82,443 | 74.8% |
| PPP | Martin Adelino Sitoy | 21,210 | 19.24% |
| Independent | Guillermo Sitoy | 5,493 | 4.98% |
| PROMDI | Ruben Talaboc | 643 | 0.58% |
| Independent | Jay Medrozo | 425 | 0.39% |
| Total votes | | 110,214 | 100% |

=== 7th District ===
Incumbent representative Peter John Calderon is vying for a second term and is running unopposed.

2022 Philippine House of Representatives election in Cebu's 7th District
| Party | Candidate | Votes | % |
|---|---|---|---|
| NPC | Peter John Calderon | 94,715 | 100% |
| Total votes | | 94,715 | 100% |

=== Cebu City ===
==== 1st District ====
Actor Richard Yap is running again as 1st district representative after losing to the late Raul del Mar in the 2019 elections. Yap will face off with former party mate and incumbent city councilor Prisca Niña Mabatid and del Mar's daughter Rachel, who previously served as the district's representative from 2010 to 2013.

2022 Philippine House of Representatives election in Cebu City's 1st District
| Party | Candidate | Votes | % |
|---|---|---|---|
| NPC | Rachel del Mar | 111,851 | 45.88% |
| PDP–Laban | Prisca Niña Mabatid | 61,501 | 25.23% |
| NUP | Richard Yap | 50,830 | 20.85% |
| Lakas | Avenescio Piramide | 17,782 | 7.29% |
| Independent | Manuel Momongan | 1,821 | 0.75% |
| Total votes | | 243,785 | 100% |
| Margin of victory | | 50,350 | 20.65% |

==== 2nd District ====
BG Rodrigo Abellanosa attempted to succeed his father, incumbent district representative Rodrigo Abellanosa. He faced off and lost against Eduardo Rama Jr., an incumbent city councilor and nephew of incumbent vice mayor Michael Rama.

2022 Philippine House of Representatives election in Cebu City's 2nd District
| Party | Candidate | Votes | % |
|---|---|---|---|
| PDP–Laban | Eduardo Rama Jr. | 157,165 | 54.44% |
| LDP | BG Rodrigo Abellanosa | 131,550 | 45.56% |
| Total votes | | 288,715 | 100% |
| Margin of victory | | 25,615 | 8.78% |

=== Lapu-Lapu City ===
Incumbent representative Paz Radaza is eyeing a return as mayor of Lapu-Lapu City thereby making the lone district an open seat. Six candidates will compete for the seat including Maria Cynthia King-Chan, wife of incumbent mayor Junard Chan and incumbent city councilor Michael Dignos.

2022 Philippine House of Representatives election in Lapu-Lapu City's Lone District
| Party | Candidate | Votes | % |
|---|---|---|---|
| PDP–Laban | Maria Cynthia King-Chan | 136,713 | 74.31% |
| Lakas | Michael Dignos | 35,699 | 19.40% |
| PDDS | Manuel Degollacion Jr. | 6,393 | 3.47% |
| Liberal | Chezie Demegillo | 3,007 | 1.63% |
| Independent | Genaro Tampus | 1,451 | 0.79% |
| PLM | Pablo Doronio Jr. | 724 | 0.39% |
| Total votes | | 183,987 | 100% |
| Margin of victory | | 101,014 | 54.91% |

=== Mandaue City ===
Incumbent representative of 6th congressional district Emmarie Ouano-Dizon is vying to become the first representative of the newly created lone district of Mandaue City and is running unopposed.

2022 Philippine House of Representatives election in Mandaue City's Lone District
| Party | Candidate | Votes | % |
|---|---|---|---|
| PDP–Laban | Emmarie Ouano-Dizon | 153,004 | 100% |
| Total votes | | 153,004 | 100% |
| Margin of victory | | 153,004 | 100% |

== City and municipal elections ==
=== 1st District, mayoral elections ===
==== Carcar ====
Incumbent mayor Mercedita Apura is vying as vice mayor, switching places with her husband incumbent vice mayor and former mayor Nicepuro Apura, who is running against incumbent councilor and former mayor Patrick Barcenas.

Carcar mayoral election
| Party | Candidate | Votes | % |
|---|---|---|---|
| 1-Cebu | Patrick Barcenas | 43,177 | 60.41% |
| Nacionalista | Nicepuro Apura | 28,291 | 39.59% |
| Total votes | | 71,468 | 100% |
| Margin of victory | | 14,886 | 20.82% |

==== Naga City ====
Incumbent mayor Kristine Vanessa Chiong is not running. Her father, former mayor Valdemar Chiong is running against two candidates which includes former councilor Venci Del Mar.

Naga City Mayoral election
| Party | Candidate | Votes | % |
|---|---|---|---|
| Nacionalista | Valdemar Chiong | 52,486 | 78.49% |
| PDDS | Delfin Señor | 10,130 | 15.15% |
| PROMDI | Venci Del Mar | 4,252 | 6.36% |
| Total votes | | 66,868 | 100% |
| Margin of victory | | 42,356 | 63.34% |

==== Talisay City ====
Incumbent mayor Gerald Anthony Gullas Jr. is vying for a second term. He is running against incumbent vice mayor Alan Bucao.

Talisay City Mayoral election
| Party | Candidate | Votes | % |
|---|---|---|---|
| Nacionalista | Gerald Anthony Gullas Jr. | 93,701 | 74.97% |
| Reporma | Alan Bucao | 31,277 | 25.03% |
| Total votes | | 124,978 | 100% |
| Margin of victory | | 62,424 | 49.94% |

==== Minglanilla ====
Incumbent mayor Elanito Peña is term-limited. Four candidates will compete for the seat which includes businessman Francis Gerard Cañedo, incumbent councilor Rajiv Enad, and incumbent vice mayor Loben Geonzon.

Minglanilla Mayoral election
| Party | Candidate | Votes | % |
|---|---|---|---|
| Nacionalista | Rajiv Enad | 31,159 | 49.24% |
| Aksyon | Francis Gerard Cañedo | 24,862 | 39.29% |
| PROMDI | Loben Geonzon | 4,228 | 6.68% |
| Independent | Francisco Cañedo | 3,037 | 4.80% |
| Total votes | | 63,286 | 100% |
| Margin of victory | | 6,297 | 9.95% |

==== San Fernando ====
Incumbent mayor Lakambini Reluya is vying for a third term. She is running against incumbent councilor Mytha Ann Canoy.

San Fernando Mayoral election
| Party | Candidate | Votes | % |
|---|---|---|---|
| PPP | Mytha Ann Canoy | 23,278 | 53.61% |
| Nacionalista | Lakambini Reluya | 20,143 | 46.39% |
| Total votes | | 43,421 | 100% |
| Margin of victory | | 3,135 | 7.22% |

==== Sibonga ====
Incumbent mayor Lionel Bacaltos is vying for a second term. He is running against two candidates.

Sibonga Mayoral election
| Party | Candidate | Votes | % |
|---|---|---|---|
| Nacionalista | Lionel Bacaltos | 23,721 | 88.34% |
| PROMDI | Tito Satera | 2,750 | 10.24% |
| Independent | Eutiquio Vilocura Jr. | 382 | 1.42% |
| Total votes | | 26,853 | 100% |
| Margin of victory | | 20,971 | 78.10% |

=== 2nd District, mayoral elections ===
==== Alcoy ====
Incumbent mayor Michael Sestoso is vying for a third term. He is running against engineer Jose Eugenio Singson.

Alcoy Mayoral election
| Party | Candidate | Votes | % |
|---|---|---|---|
| 1-Cebu | Michael Sestoso | 6,739 | 53.71% |
| Reporma | Jose Eugenio Singson | 5,809 | 46.29% |
| Total votes | | 12,548 | 100% |
| Margin of victory | | 930 | 7.42% |

==== Argao ====
Incumbent mayor Allan Sesaldo is vying for a second term. He is running against four candidates which includes outgoing representative of Cebu's 2nd congressional district Wilfredo Caminero.

Argao Mayoral election
| Party | Candidate | Votes | % |
|---|---|---|---|
| PDP–Laban | Allan Sesaldo | 22,933 | 50.48% |
| NUP | Wilfredo Caminero | 21,894 | 48.19% |
| PROMDI | Wilfredo Albarracin | 427 | 0.94% |
| Independent | Pepito Garganera Jr. | 109 | 0.24% |
| PDDS | Jesus Relampago | 71 | 0.16% |
| Total votes | | 45,434 | 100% |
| Margin of victory | | 1,039 | 2.29% |

==== Boljoon ====
Incumbent mayor Merlou Derama is term-limited. His cousin, incumbent Poblacion barangay captain and ex officio councilor Jojie Derama is running unopposed.

Boljoon Mayoral election
| Party | Candidate | Votes | % |
|---|---|---|---|
| 1-Cebu | Jojie Derama | 6,407 | 100% |
| Total votes | | 6,407 | 100% |

==== Dalaguete ====
Incumbent mayor Jeffrey Belciña is running for councilor thereby making it an open seat. Three candidates will compete for the seat which includes Jesson Belciña, former mayor Ronald Allan Cesante and incumbent councilor John Ritz Osorio.

Dalaguete Mayoral election
| Party | Candidate | Votes | % |
|---|---|---|---|
| PDP–Laban | Ronald Allan Cesante | 23,580 | 62.80% |
| NUP | John Ritz Osorio | 13,515 | 35.99% |
| Independent | Jesson Belciña | 454 | 1.21% |
| Total votes | | 37,549 | 100% |
| Margin of victory | | 10,065 | 26.81% |

==== Oslob ====
Incumbent mayor Jose Tumulak Jr. is vying for a third term. He is running against three candidates namely incumbent councilor Lucy Abines, incumbent vice mayor Christopher Amit, and former mayor Ronald Guaren.

Oslob Mayoral election
| Party | Candidate | Votes | % |
|---|---|---|---|
| PDP–Laban | Ronald Guaren | 7,968 | 45.44% |
| NUP | Jose Tumulak Jr. | 6,211 | 35.42% |
| PROMDI | Lucy Abines | 2,805 | 16% |
| PRP | Christopher Amit | 552 | 3.15% |
| Total votes | | 17,536 | 100% |
| Margin of victory | | 1,757 | 10.02% |

==== Samboan ====
Incumbent mayor Emerito Calderon Jr. is vying for a third term. He is running against Aguinaldo Jesus Briones.

Samboan Mayoral election
| Party | Candidate | Votes | % |
|---|---|---|---|
| NPC | Emerito Calderon Jr. | 7,954 | 70.10% |
| Reporma | Aguinaldo Jesus Briones | 3,392 | 29.90% |
| Total votes | | 11,346 | 100% |
| Margin of victory | | 4,562 | 40.20% |

==== Santander ====
Incumbent mayor Marites Buscato is vying for a second term. She is running against two candidates.

Santander Mayoral election
| Party | Candidate | Votes | % |
|---|---|---|---|
| 1-Cebu | Marites Buscato | 6,867 | 61.33% |
| Lakas | Mary Ann Aseñas | 3,931 | 35.11% |
| Reporma | Rajeni Dy | 398 | 3.55% |
| Total votes | | 11,196 | 100% |
| Margin of victory | | 2,936 | 26.22% |

=== 3rd District, mayoral elections ===
==== Toledo City ====
Incumbent mayor Marjorie Perales is vying for a second term. She is running against incumbent councilor Mansueto Birao and incumbent Biga barangay captain Pedro Sepada Jr.

Toledo City Mayoral election
| Party | Candidate | Votes | % |
|---|---|---|---|
| 1-Cebu | Marjorie Perales | 68,522 | 70.29% |
| PPP | Pedro Sepada Jr. | 27,066 | 27.77% |
| PROMDI | Mansueto Birao | 1,894 | 1.94% |
| Total votes | | 97,482 | 100% |
| Margin of victory | | 41,486 | 42.52% |

==== Aloguinsan ====
Incumbent mayor Cesare Ignatius Moreno is vying for a second term. He is running against Roel Manguilimotan.

Aloguinsan Mayoral election
| Party | Candidate | Votes | % |
|---|---|---|---|
| 1-Cebu | Cesare Ignatius Moreno | 12,291 | 82.77% |
| Independent | Roel Manguilimotan | 2,558 | 17.23% |
| Total votes | | 14,849 | 100% |
| Margin of victory | | 9,733 | 65.54% |

==== Asturias ====
Incumbent mayor Jose Antonio Pintor is vying for a third term. He is running against former councilor Clavel Serognas and Dana Andrew Dumdum.

Asturias Mayoral election
| Party | Candidate | Votes | % |
|---|---|---|---|
| PPP | Dana Andrew Dumdum | 14,861 | 50.5% |
| 1-Cebu | Jose Antonio Pintor | 14,169 | 48.15% |
| Independent | Clavel Serognas | 399 | 1.36% |
| Total votes | | 29,429 | 100% |
| Margin of victory | | 692 | 2.35% |

==== Balamban ====
Incumbent mayor Alex Binghay is not running. His son, former mayor Ace Binghay is running unopposed.

Balamban Mayoral election
| Party | Candidate | Votes | % |
|---|---|---|---|
| 1-Cebu | Ace Binghay | 24,147 | 100% |
| Total votes | | 24,147 | 100% |

==== Barili ====
Incumbent mayor Julieto Flores, who assumed office after the death of former mayor Marlon Garcia, is running for his first full three-year term. He is running against incumbent councilor and son of the former mayor, Pablo John Garcia IV.

Barili Mayoral election
| Party | Candidate | Votes | % |
|---|---|---|---|
| 1-Cebu | Pablo John Garcia IV | 24,836 | 54.54% |
| PPP | Julieto Flores | 20,705 | 45.46% |
| Total votes | | 45,541 | 100% |
| Margin of victory | | 4,131 | 9.08% |

==== Pinamungajan ====
Incumbent mayor Glenn Baricuatro is term-limited. His wife, incumbent councilor Ana Jessica Baricuatro is running against incumbent councilor Salipada Cerna.

Pinamungajan Mayoral election
| Party | Candidate | Votes | % |
|---|---|---|---|
| 1-Cebu | Ana Jessica Baricuatro | 21,307 | 52.42% |
| PROMDI | Salipada Cerna | 19,343 | 47.58% |
| Total votes | | 40,650 | 100% |
| Margin of victory | | 1,964 | 4.84% |

==== Tuburan ====
Incumbent mayor Danilo Diamante is vying as vice mayor, switching places with his brother incumbent vice mayor and former mayor Democrito Diamante, who is running unopposed.

Tuburan Mayoral election
| Party | Candidate | Votes | % |
|---|---|---|---|
| Independent | Democrito Diamante | 31,786 | 100% |
| Total votes | | 31,786 | 100% |

=== 4th District, mayoral elections ===
==== Bogo ====
Incumbent mayor Carlo Jose Martinez is vying for a third term. He is running against defeated 2019 vice gubernatorial candidate Daphne Salimbangon.

Bogo Mayoral election
| Party | Candidate | Votes | % |
|---|---|---|---|
| PPP | Carlo Jose Martinez | 34,680 | 76.62% |
| NUP | Daphne Salimbangon | 10,584 | 23.38% |
| Total votes | | 45,264 | 100% |
| Margin of victory | | 24,096 | 53.24% |

==== Bantayan ====
Incumbent mayor Arthur Despi is vying for a second term. He is running against two candidates which includes former mayor Geralyn Escario-Cañares.

Bantayan Mayoral election
| Party | Candidate | Votes | % |
|---|---|---|---|
| 1-Cebu | Arthur Despi | 23,277 | 59.39% |
| PPP | Geralyn Escario-Cañares | 15,646 | 39.92% |
| Reporma | Arsenio Mata | 269 | 0.69% |
| Total votes | | 39,192 | 100% |
| Margin of victory | | 7,631 | 19.47% |

==== Daanbantayan ====
Incumbent mayor Sun Shimura is vying for a second term. He is running against former councilor Renillo Gullem.

Daanbantayan Mayoral election
| Party | Candidate | Votes | % |
|---|---|---|---|
| NUP | Sun Shimura | 29,953 | 65.79% |
| PPP | Renillo Gullem | 15,573 | 34.21% |
| Total votes | | 45,526 | 100% |
| Margin of victory | | 14,380 | 31.58% |

==== Madridejos ====
Incumbent mayor Salvador Dela Fuente is vying for a second term. He is running against engineer Romeo Villaceran.

Madridejos Mayoral election
| Party | Candidate | Votes | % |
|---|---|---|---|
| 1-Cebu | Romeo Villaceran | 13,038 | 54.33% |
| Nacionalista | Salvador Dela Fuente | 10,961 | 45.67% |
| Total votes | | 23,999 | 100% |
| Margin of victory | | 2,077 | 8.66% |

==== Medellin ====
Incumbent mayor Joven Mondigo Jr. is vying for a third term. He is running against Francis Eric Sucro.

Medellin Mayoral election
| Party | Candidate | Votes | % |
|---|---|---|---|
| 1-Cebu | Joven Mondigo Jr. | 22,266 | 70.38% |
| Independent | Francis Eric Sucro | 9,370 | 29.62% |
| Total votes | | 31,636 | 100% |
| Margin of victory | | 12,896 | 40.76% |

==== San Remigio ====
Incumbent mayor Mariano Martinez is term-limited. His son, incumbent councilor Miguel Maria Martinez is running against incumbent vice mayor Alfonso Pestolante.

San Remigio Mayoral election
| Party | Candidate | Votes | % |
|---|---|---|---|
| NUP | Alfonso Pestolante | 19,000 | 53.81% |
| PPP | Miguel Maria Martinez | 16,310 | 46.19% |
| Total votes | | 35,310 | 100% |
| Margin of victory | | 2,690 | 7.62% |

==== Santa Fe ====
Incumbent mayor Ithamar Espinosa is vying for a second term. He is running against three candidates which includes former mayor Jose Esgana and incumbent vice mayor Naomi Espinosa.

Santa Fe Mayoral election
| Party | Candidate | Votes | % |
|---|---|---|---|
| NUP | Ithamar Espinosa | 9,832 | 53.97% |
| PPP | Naomi Espinosa | 4,743 | 26.03% |
| Reporma | Jose Esgana | 3,565 | 19.57% |
| Independent | Wilfredo Salise | 78 | 0.43% |
| Total votes | | 18,218 | 100% |
| Margin of victory | | 5,089 | 27.94% |

==== Tabogon ====
Incumbent mayor Zigfred Duterte is term-limited. His wife, incumbent councilor Gloria Duterte is running against incumbent vice mayor Leonardo Arpon and incumbent councilor Francis Salimbangon.

Tabogon Mayoral election
| Party | Candidate | Votes | % |
|---|---|---|---|
| 1-Cebu | Francis Salimbangon | 15,253 | 63.48% |
| PDP–Laban | Gloria Duterte | 8,199 | 34.12% |
| PROMDI | Leonardo Arpon | 576 | 2.40% |
| Total votes | | 24,028 | 100% |
| Margin of victory | | 7,054 | 29.36% |

==== Tabuelan ====
Incumbent mayor Raul Gerona is vying for a second term. He is running against Fe Oca.

Tabuelan Mayoral election
| Party | Candidate | Votes | % |
|---|---|---|---|
| NUP | Raul Gerona | 12,588 | 74.64% |
| PPP | Fe Oca | 4,277 | 25.36% |
| Total votes | | 16,865 | 100% |
| Margin of victory | | 8,311 | 49.28% |

=== 5th District, mayoral elections ===
Incumbent mayor Ramon Durano III is term-limited. His son, incumbent vice mayor Thomas Mark Durano is running against two candidates.

==== Danao ====
Danao mayoral election
| Party | Candidate | Votes | % |
|---|---|---|---|
| PPP | Thomas Mark Durano | 53,848 | 70.86% |
| 1-Cebu | Thomas Trinidad Duterte | 21,499 | 28.29% |
| PPM | Ricardo Tito | 640 | 0.84% |
| Total votes | | 75,987 | 100% |
| Margin of victory | | 32,349 | 42.57% |

==== Borbon ====
Incumbent mayor Noel Dotillos is vying for a third term. He is running against three candidates.

Borbon Mayoral election
| Party | Candidate | Votes | % |
|---|---|---|---|
| 1-Cebu | Noel Dotillos | 14,087 | 64.71% |
| BAKUD | Margarito Ornopia Jr. | 6,737 | 30.94% |
| WPP | Joan Mangubat | 868 | 3.99% |
| PROMDI | Joshua Polinag | 79 | 0.36% |
| Total votes | | 21,771 | 100% |
| Margin of victory | | 7,350 | 33.77% |

==== Carmen ====
Incumbent mayor Carlo Villamor is vying for a second term. He is running against Antonio Awing.

Carmen Mayoral election
| Party | Candidate | Votes | % |
|---|---|---|---|
| 1-Cebu | Carlo Villamor | 21,280 | 65.97% |
| BAKUD | Antonio Awing | 10,976 | 34.03% |
| Total votes | | 32,256 | 100% |
| Margin of victory | | 10,304 | 31.94% |

==== Catmon ====
Incumbent mayor Irish Baylon-Gestopa is vying for a second term. She is running against Avis Monleon.

Catmon Mayoral election
| Party | Candidate | Votes | % |
|---|---|---|---|
| 1-Cebu | Avis Monleon | 11,887 | 35.27% |
| BAKUD | Irish Baylon-Gestopa | 6,476 | 64.73% |
| Total votes | | 18,363 | 100% |
| Margin of victory | | 5,411 | 29.46% |

==== Compostela ====
Incumbent mayor Froilan Quiño is vying as vice mayor. His uncle, incumbent councilor Felijur Quiño is running against three candidates namely former mayor Joel Quiño, former mayor Ritchie Wagas, and incumbent councilor Ma. Madeline Yuson-Pepito.

Compostela Mayoral election
| Party | Candidate | Votes | % |
|---|---|---|---|
| NUP | Felijur Quiño | 11,390 | 35.99% |
| BAKUD | Joel Quiño | 10,069 | 31.81% |
| 1-Cebu | Ritchie Wagas | 8,326 | 26.31% |
| PRP | Ma. Madeline Yuson-Pepito | 1,864 | 5.89% |
| Total votes | | 31,649 | 100% |
| Margin of victory | | 1,321 | 4.18% |

==== Liloan ====
Incumbent mayor Maria Esperanza Christina Frasco is vying for a third term. She is running against retired regional trial court judge Ulric Cañete. Although reelected, Christina Frasco will assume as Secretary of the Department of Tourism effective June 30. Reelected Vice-mayor Aljew Frasco will assume as Mayor of Liloan.

Liloan Mayoral election
| Party | Candidate | Votes | % |
|---|---|---|---|
| 1-Cebu | Maria Esperanza Christina Frasco | 59,095 | 86.05% |
| BAKUD | Ulric Cañete | 9,580 | 13.95% |
| Total votes | | 68,675 | 100% |
| Margin of victory | | 49,515 | 72.10% |

==== Pilar ====
Incumbent mayor Manuel Santiago is vying for a second term. He is running against lawyer Joseph Malaluan.

Pilar Mayoral election
| Party | Candidate | Votes | % |
|---|---|---|---|
| BAKUD | Manuel Santiago | 4,310 | 51.80% |
| 1-Cebu | Joseph Malaluan | 4,010 | 48.20% |
| Total votes | | 8,320 | 100% |
| Margin of victory | | 300 | 3.60% |

==== Poro ====
Incumbent mayor Edgar Rama is vying for a second term. He is running against his uncle, incumbent vice mayor and former mayor Luciano Rama Jr.

Poro Mayoral election
| Party | Candidate | Votes | % |
|---|---|---|---|
| BAKUD | Edgar Rama | 7,748 | 53.55% |
| 1-Cebu | Luciano Rama Jr. | 6,721 | 46.45% |
| Total votes | | 14,469 | 100% |
| Margin of victory | | 1,027 | 7.10% |

==== San Francisco ====
Incumbent mayor Alfredo Arquillano Jr. is vying for a second term. He is running against former councilor Hector Capao.

San Francisco Mayoral election
| Party | Candidate | Votes | % |
|---|---|---|---|
| BAKUD | Alfredo Arquillano Jr. | 16,741 | 56.60% |
| NUP | Hector Capao | 12,835 | 43.40% |
| Total votes | | 29,576 | 100% |
| Margin of victory | | 3,906 | 13.20% |

==== Sogod ====
Incumbent mayor Richard Streegan is vying as vice mayor. His wife, incumbent vice mayor and former mayor Lissa Marie Streegan is running against two candidates.

Sogod Mayoral election
| Party | Candidate | Votes | % |
|---|---|---|---|
| 1-Cebu | Lissa Marie Streegan | 17,945 | 86.92% |
| BAKUD | Eden Armecin | 1,565 | 7.58% |
| Reporma | Roberto Zamora | 1,136 | 5.50% |
| Total votes | | 20,646 | 100% |
| Margin of victory | | 16,380 | 79.34% |

==== Tudela ====
Incumbent mayor Greman Solante is vying for a second term. He is running against two candidates which includes incumbent councilor Cyrus Otadoy.

Tudela Mayoral election
| Party | Candidate | Votes | % |
|---|---|---|---|
| BAKUD | Greman Solante | 3,743 | 49.64% |
| NUP | Cyrus Otadoy | 3,708 | 49.18% |
| 1-Cebu | Ann Tirando | 89 | 1.18% |
| Total votes | | 7,540 | 100% |
| Margin of victory | | 35 | 0.46% |

=== 6th District, mayoral elections ===
==== Consolacion ====
Incumbent mayor Joannes Alegado is not running. His mother, former mayor and incumbent vice mayor Teresa Alegado is running against three candidates.

Consolacion Mayoral election
| Party | Candidate | Votes | % |
|---|---|---|---|
| PDP–Laban | Teresa Alegado | 38,789 | 53.85% |
| Independent | Ian Rose Bihag | 14,152 | 19.65% |
| PPP | Maria Ava Maureen Sanchez | 9,895 | 13.74% |
| PRP | Raul Isoto | 9,198 | 12.77% |
| Total votes | | 72,034 | 100% |
| Margin of victory | | 24,637 | 34.20% |

==== Cordova ====
Incumbent mayor Mary Therese Cho is vying for a third term. She is running against four candidates which includes incumbent councilor Cesar Suan.

Cordova Mayoral election
| Party | Candidate | Votes | % |
|---|---|---|---|
| Lakas | Cesar Suan | 21,222 | 53.38% |
| PDP–Laban | Mary Therese Cho | 17,052 | 42.89% |
| Independent | Marietto Suan | 1,359 | 3.42% |
| Independent | Sherly Pogoy | 88 | 0.22% |
| Independent | Bribon Briones | 39 | 0.10% |
| Total votes | | 39,760 | 100% |
| Margin of victory | | 4,170 | 10.49% |

=== 7th District, mayoral elections ===
==== Alcantara ====
Incumbent mayor Fritz Lastimoso is vying for a second term. He is running against former mayor Benjamin Lobitaña.

Alcantara Mayoral election
| Party | Candidate | Votes | % |
|---|---|---|---|
| 1-Cebu | Fritz Lastimoso | 6,337 | 61.25% |
| PPP | Benjamin Lobitaña | 4,009 | 38.75% |
| Total votes | | 10,346 | 100% |
| Margin of victory | | 2,328 | 22.50% |

==== Alegria ====
Incumbent mayor Verna Magallon is term-limited. Her husband, incumbent vice mayor Gilberto Magallon is running against four candidates which includes former mayor Raul Guisadio.

Alegria Mayoral election
| Party | Candidate | Votes | % |
|---|---|---|---|
| 1-Cebu | Gilberto Magallon | 7,742 | 53.70% |
| PPP | Raul Guisadio | 6,310 | 43.76% |
| PPM | Edgardo Lenizo | 201 | 1.39% |
| Independent | Eduardo Tapales | 98 | 0.68% |
| Independent | Gil Yap II | 67 | 0.46% |
| Total votes | | 14,418 | 100% |
| Margin of victory | | 1,432 | 9.94% |

==== Badian ====
Incumbent mayor Carmencita Lumain is vying for a third term. She is running against two candidates which includes incumbent councilor Mark Andrew Jorolan.

Badian Mayoral election
| Party | Candidate | Votes | % |
|---|---|---|---|
| 1-Cebu | Carmencita Lumain | 11,369 | 49.92% |
| PPP | Cielito Suerte | 6,331 | 27.80% |
| Independent | Mark Andrew Jorolan | 5,075 | 22.28% |
| Total votes | | 22,775 | 100% |
| Margin of victory | | 5,038 | 22.12% |

==== Dumanjug ====
Incumbent mayor Efren Gica is vying for a third term. He is running against Rizalina Zozobrado.

Dumanjug Mayoral election
| Party | Candidate | Votes | % |
|---|---|---|---|
| 1-Cebu | Efren Gica | 25,886 | 83.87% |
| Independent | Rizalina Zozobrado | 4,977 | 16.13% |
| Total votes | | 30,863 | 100% |
| Margin of victory | | 20,909 | 67.74% |

==== Ginatilan ====
Incumbent mayor Dean Michael Singco is term-limited. His brother, incumbent councilor Roy Vincent Singco is running unopposed.

Ginatilan Mayoral election
| Party | Candidate | Votes | % |
|---|---|---|---|
| 1-Cebu | Roy Vincent Singco | 7,578 | 100% |
| Total votes | | 7,578 | 100% |

==== Malabuyoc ====
Incumbent mayor Lito Creus is term-limited. His wife, former mayor and incumbent councilor Daisy Creus is running against Santo Niño barangay captain Erlinda Piedad.

Malabuyoc Mayoral election
| Party | Candidate | Votes | % |
|---|---|---|---|
| Independent | Erlinda Piedad | 7,507 | 59.55% |
| 1-Cebu | Daisy Creus | 5,099 | 40.45% |
| Total votes | | 12,606 | 100% |
| Margin of victory | | 2,408 | 19.10% |

==== Moalboal ====
Incumbent mayor Paz Rozgoni is vying to return as vice mayor, switching places with incumbent vice mayor and former mayor Inocentes Cabaron, who is running against two candidates.

Moalboal Mayoral election
| Party | Candidate | Votes | % |
|---|---|---|---|
| 1-Cebu | Inocentes Cabaron | 11,854 | 64.57% |
| Independent | Yancy Gabriel Ubas | 6,180 | 33.66% |
| Independent | Felipe Gako | 324 | 1.76% |
| Total votes | | 18,358 | 100% |
| Margin of victory | | 5,674 | 30.91% |

==== Ronda ====
Incumbent mayor Terence Blanco is vying for a second term and is running unopposed.

Ronda Mayoral election
| Party | Candidate | Votes | % |
|---|---|---|---|
| 1-Cebu | Terence Blanco | 11,369 | 100% |
| Total votes | | 11,369 | 100% |

=== Cebu City, mayoral election ===
Margarita Osmeña, a former city councilor and wife of former mayor Tomas Osmeña, is challenging incumbent mayor Michael Rama for the position of mayor. Rama assumed the post after the death of mayor Edgardo Labella. Outgoing city councilor David Tumulak has also joined the race as an independent candidate.

Cebu City Mayoral election
| Party | Candidate | Votes | % |
|---|---|---|---|
| Independent | Edgar Concha Jr. | 1,077 | 0.19% |
| Independent | Juanito Luna | 718 | 0.13% |
| LDP | Margarita Osmeña | 190,836 | 34.52% |
| PDP–Laban | Michael Rama | 226,328 | 40.94% |
| Independent | Crisologo Saavedra Jr. | 1,342 | 0.24% |
| Independent | David Tumulak | 132,510 | 23.97% |
| Total votes | | 552,811 | 100% |
| Margin of victory | | 35,492 | 6.42% |

=== Lapu-Lapu City, mayoral election ===
Incumbent mayor Junard Chan is vying for a second term. He is running against former mayor and incumbent representative of Lapu-Lapu's lone district Paz Radaza.

Lapu-Lapu City Mayoral election
| Party | Candidate | Votes | % |
|---|---|---|---|
| PDP–Laban | Junard Chan | 148,629 | 76.51% |
| Lakas | Paz Radaza | 45,634 | 23.49% |
| Total votes | | 194,263 | 100% |
| Margin of victory | | 102,995 | 53.02% |

=== Mandaue City, mayoral election ===
Incumbent mayor Jonas Cortes is vying for a second term. He is running against former city councilor Nilo Seno.

Mandaue City Mayoral election
| Party | Candidate | Votes | % |
|---|---|---|---|
| PDP–Laban | Jonas Cortes | 102,786 | 55.57% |
| Independent | Nilo Seno | 82,182 | 44.43% |
| Total votes | | 184,968 | 100% |
| Margin of victory | | 20,604 | 11.14% |
