= 2005 Cebu's 5th congressional district special election =

2005 special election at Cebu's 5th congressional district
- May 30, 2005

Cebu's 5th congressional district Triggered by resignation of the incumbent
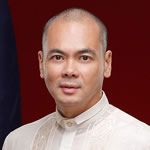

Candidate	Ramon Durano VI	Dean Severo Dosado	Wilfredo Tuadles
Party	NPC	PMP	Independent
Popular vote	113,589	4,345	1,711
Percentage	94.94	3.63	1.43
Representative before election
Joseph Ace Durano
Lakas
Representative-elect
Ramon Durano VI
NPC

A special election for Cebu's 5th district seat in the House of Representatives of the Philippines was held on May 30, 2005, to fill the district's vacant seat for the remainder of the 13th Congress. The vacancy arose when Joseph Ace Durano, the district's representative, resigned from the seat to accept his appointment as Secretary of Tourism. Ramon Durano VI won the special election and would then serve the remainder of his brother's term which ended in 2007.

== Electoral system ==
The House of Representatives is elected via parallel voting system, with 80% of seats elected from congressional districts, and 20% from the party-list system. Each district sends one representative to the House of Representatives. An election to the seat is via first-past-the-post, in which the candidate with the most votes, whether or not one has a majority, wins the seat.

Based on Republic Act (RA) No. 6645, in order for a special election to take place, the seat must be vacated, the relevant chamber notifies the Commission on Elections (COMELEC) the existence of a vacancy, then the COMELEC schedules the special election. There is a dispute in the procedure as a subsequent law, RA No. 7166, supposedly amended the procedure, bypassing the need for official communication from the relevant chamber of the vacancy. The COMELEC has always waited on official communication from the relevant chamber before scheduling a special election.

Meanwhile, according to RA No. 8295, should only one candidate file to run in the special election, the COMELEC will declare that candidate as the winner and will no longer hold the election.

== Background ==
Early in his third consecutive term in 2004, representative Joseph Ace Durano (Lakas–CMD) was appointed by President Gloria Macapagal Arroyo as Secretary of Tourism. Durano accepted the appointment on November 30, 2004, which vacated the seat. As a result, the House of Representatives issued a resolution on March 2, 2005, declaring the seat vacant, paving way for the Commission on Elections to call an election on May 30, 2005. Candidates filed their certificates of candidacy from April 22 to 28. Campaign period was from April 29 to May 28.

Agnes Magpale, member of the Cebu Provincial Board, said that her elder brother, Ramon Durano VI, was being encouraged by local political leaders to run, with Ramon Durano III, their father, supporting Ramon VI. Ramon III's estranged brother, former Danao mayor Don Durano, is being eyed to run against Ramon VI; if Ramon III refuses, the provincial opposition is seeking to field in Carmen councilor Mark Gerald Villamor instead.

=== District profile ===
Cebu's 5th congressional district in 2005.

Cebu's 5th congressional district, centered on Danao, is located on Cebu's northeast, including the Camotes Islands. The district, and its predecessor districts, has been held by the Durano family for decades. Ramon Durano Sr., previously held the seat from 1949 to 1972 (the area was districted as Cebu's 1st district at that time). Ramon VI's father, Ramon Durano III, mayor of Danao by 2005, later became congressman and then represented the district for three consecutive terms from 1987 to 1998, before Joseph Ace succeeded him. Joseph Ace was on his second term when he was appointed Tourism secretary.

== Candidates ==
Three candidates ran in the election:

1. Dean Severo Dosado (PMP), former vice mayor of Sogod (1995–2001)
2. Ramon Durano VI (NPC), brother of previous congressman Ace Durano
3. Wilfredo Tuadles (independent), businessman

== Campaign ==
Local government officials endorsed Ramon VI's candidacy. A manifesto signed by board members Magpale and Judy Durano, Danao mayor Ramon III, vice mayor Ramon Durano Jr., 10 Danao councilors, eight town mayors, and 103 barangay captains and councilors showed support for Ramon VI.

President Gloria Macapagal Arroyo declared a special non-working holiday in the 5th district on election day so that voters can participate in the election.

== Result ==
2005 Cebu's 5th congressional district special election
Candidate	Party	Votes	%
Ramon Durano VI	Nationalist People's Coalition	113,589	94.94
Dean Severo Dosado	Pwersa ng Masang Pilipino	4,345	3.63
Wilfredo Tuadles	Independent	1,711	1.43
Total		119,645	100.00
Registered voters/turnout			48.56
Majority		109,244	91.31
Nationalist People's Coalition gain from Lakas–NUCD–UMDP			

Durano's brother, Ramon Durano VI of the Nationalist People's Coalition (NPC), won convincingly to keep the seat within the Durano family, winning in all 891 polling precincts in the district's ten towns and Danao. Even before the votes were cast, Durano's opponent, Dean Severo Dosado, was quoted as having said he did not think he was going to win. He and the other candidate, Wilfredo Tuadles, did not field any poll watchers.

The low turnout (48.56%) was blamed on the non-inclusion of areas outside the district in the special holiday for the election. Another factor was the nonexistence of campaign materials from the candidates. The turnout in Liloan, the town with the lowest turnout at 31.78%, was blamed on the town fiesta that prevented the electorate from voting.

Dosado described the election as a "waste of money" and blamed Joseph Ace for it.

== Aftermath ==
Ramon successfully defended the seat in 2007 and in 2010. In 2013, he gave up the seat to run for vice mayor of Danao, with Joseph Ace running to replace him. Ramon lost the vice mayor election, while Joseph Ace won the congressional election. In 2016, Joseph Ace then gave up the seat to become the manager of Grace Poe's presidential campaign, while Ramon ran to succeed Joseph Ace. Ramon won the congressional election, but was then defeated by Duke Frasco in 2019, ending the Durano's 70-year string of election victories. Frasco defeated Ramon Durano VI anew in 2022.

In 2007, Dosado was indicted for libel, based on a suit filed by Sogod mayor Thadeus Durano, elder brother of Ramon III. Dosado then sued Sogod mayor Lissa Marie Durano-Streegan (Thadeus's daughter) in 2014 to have the municipality pay his leave credits. Two years later, he sued the same mayor for not filing her statement of assets, liabilities and net worth.
