= Cebu's 5th congressional district =

Legislative district of the Philippines

- Constituency for the House of Representatives of the Philippines
- Boundary of Cebu's 5th congressional district in Cebu

- Location of Cebu within the Philippines
- Province: Cebu
- Region: Central Visayas
- Population: 643,946 (2020)
- Electorate: 397,223 (2022)
- Major settlements: 11 LGUs: Cities; Danao; Municipalities; Borbon; Carmen; Catmon; Compostela; Liloan; Pilar; Poro; San Francisco; Sogod; Tudela
- Area: 877.67 km^{2} (338.87 sq mi)

Current constituency
- Created: 1907
- Representative: Vincent Franco D. Frasco
- Political party: 1CEBU
- Congressional bloc: Majority

Cebu's 5th congressional district is one of the seven congressional districts of the Philippines in the province of Cebu. It has been represented in the House of Representatives of the Philippines since 1916 and earlier in the Philippine Assembly from 1907 to 1916. The district consists of the city of Danao and adjacent municipalities in the northeast and the Camotes Islands: Borbon, Carmen, Catmon, Compostela, Liloan, Pilar, Poro, San Francisco, Sogod and Tudela. It is currently represented in the 20th Congress by Vincent Franco D. Frasco of the One Cebu (1CEBU).

Prior to its second dissolution in 1972, it consisted of the southern municipalities of Alcantara, Alegria, Badian, Boljoon, Ginatilan, Malabuyoc, Moalboal, Oslob, Samboan, and Santander.

== Representation history ==
#	Image	Member	Term of office		Legislature	Party	Electoral history	Constituent LGUs
#	Image	Member	Start	End	Legislature	Party	Electoral history	Constituent LGUs
=== Cebu's 5th district for the Philippine Assembly ===
District created January 9, 1907.
1		Troadio Galicano	October 16, 1907	October 16, 1912	1st	Nacionalista	Elected in 1907.	1907–1916; Alegria, Badian, Boljoon, Ginatilan, Malabuyoc, Moalboal, Oslob, Samboan
1		Troadio Galicano	October 16, 1907	October 16, 1912	2nd	Nacionalista	Re-elected in 1909.	1907–1916; Alegria, Badian, Boljoon, Ginatilan, Malabuyoc, Moalboal, Oslob, Samboan
2		Mariano Jesús Cuenco	October 16, 1912	October 16, 1916	3rd	Nacionalista	Elected in 1912.	1907–1916; Alegria, Badian, Boljoon, Ginatilan, Malabuyoc, Moalboal, Oslob, Samboan
=== Cebu's 5th district for the House of Representatives of the Philippine Islands ===
(2)		Mariano Jesús Cuenco	October 16, 1916	June 5, 1928	4th	Nacionalista	Re-elected in 1916.	1916–1919; Alcantara, Alegria, Badian, Boljoon, Ginatilan, Malabuyoc, Moalboal, Oslob, Samboan
(2)		Mariano Jesús Cuenco	October 16, 1916	June 5, 1928	5th	Nacionalista	Re-elected in 1919.	1919–1935; Alcantara, Alegria, Badian, Boljoon, Ginatilan, Malabuyoc, Moalboal, Oslob, Samboan, Santander
(2)		Mariano Jesús Cuenco	October 16, 1916	June 5, 1928	6th	Nacionalista; Unipersonalista	Re-elected in 1922.	1919–1935; Alcantara, Alegria, Badian, Boljoon, Ginatilan, Malabuyoc, Moalboal, Oslob, Samboan, Santander
(2)		Mariano Jesús Cuenco	October 16, 1916	June 5, 1928	7th	Nacionalista; Consolidado	Re-elected in 1925.	1919–1935; Alcantara, Alegria, Badian, Boljoon, Ginatilan, Malabuyoc, Moalboal, Oslob, Samboan, Santander
3		Tomás N. Alonso	June 5, 1928	June 2, 1931	8th	Nacionalista; Consolidado	Elected in 1928.	1919–1935; Alcantara, Alegria, Badian, Boljoon, Ginatilan, Malabuyoc, Moalboal, Oslob, Samboan, Santander
4		Miguel Cuenco	June 2, 1931	September 16, 1935	9th	Nacionalista; Consolidado	Elected in 1931.	1919–1935; Alcantara, Alegria, Badian, Boljoon, Ginatilan, Malabuyoc, Moalboal, Oslob, Samboan, Santander
4		Miguel Cuenco	June 2, 1931	September 16, 1935	10th	Nacionalista; Demócrata Pro-Independencia	Re-elected in 1934.	1919–1935; Alcantara, Alegria, Badian, Boljoon, Ginatilan, Malabuyoc, Moalboal, Oslob, Samboan, Santander
#	Image	Member	Term of office		National Assembly	Party	Electoral history	Constituent LGUs
#	Image	Member	Start	End	National Assembly	Party	Electoral history	Constituent LGUs
=== Cebu's 5th district for the National Assembly (Commonwealth of the Philippines) ===
(4)		Miguel Cuenco	September 16, 1935	December 30, 1941	1st	Nacionalista; Demócrata Pro-Independencia	Re-elected in 1935.	1935–1941; Alcantara, Alegria, Badian, Boljoon, Ginatilan, Malabuyoc, Moalboal, Oslob, Samboan, Santander
(4)		Miguel Cuenco	September 16, 1935	December 30, 1941	2nd	Nacionalista	Re-elected in 1938.	1935–1941; Alcantara, Alegria, Badian, Boljoon, Ginatilan, Malabuyoc, Moalboal, Oslob, Samboan, Santander
District dissolved into the two-seat Cebu's at-large district for the National Assembly (Second Philippine Republic).
#	Image	Member	Term of office		Common wealth Congress	Party	Electoral history	Constituent LGUs
#	Image	Member	Start	End	Common wealth Congress	Party	Electoral history	Constituent LGUs
=== Cebu's 5th district for the House of Representatives of the Commonwealth of the Philippines ===
District re-created May 24, 1945.
(4)		Miguel Cuenco	June 9, 1945	May 25, 1946	1st	Nacionalista	Re-elected in 1941.	1945–1946; Alcantara, Alegria, Badian, Boljoon, Ginatilan, Malabuyoc, Moalboal, Oslob, Samboan, Santander
#	Image	Member	Term of office		Congress	Party	Electoral history	Constituent LGUs
#	Image	Member	Start	End	Congress	Party	Electoral history	Constituent LGUs
=== Cebu's 5th district for the House of Representatives of the Philippines ===
5		Leandro Tojong	May 25, 1946	December 30, 1949	1st	Liberal	Elected in 1946.	1946–1972; Alcantara, Alegria, Badian, Boljoon, Ginatilan, Malabuyoc, Moalboal, Oslob, Samboan, Santander
(4)		Miguel Cuenco	December 30, 1949	December 30, 1965	2nd	Nacionalista	Elected in 1949.	1946–1972; Alcantara, Alegria, Badian, Boljoon, Ginatilan, Malabuyoc, Moalboal, Oslob, Samboan, Santander
(4)		Miguel Cuenco	December 30, 1949	December 30, 1965	3rd	Nacionalista	Re-elected in 1953.	1946–1972; Alcantara, Alegria, Badian, Boljoon, Ginatilan, Malabuyoc, Moalboal, Oslob, Samboan, Santander
(4)		Miguel Cuenco	December 30, 1949	December 30, 1965	4th	Nacionalista	Re-elected in 1957.	1946–1972; Alcantara, Alegria, Badian, Boljoon, Ginatilan, Malabuyoc, Moalboal, Oslob, Samboan, Santander
(4)		Miguel Cuenco	December 30, 1949	December 30, 1965	5th	Nacionalista	Re-elected in 1961.	1946–1972; Alcantara, Alegria, Badian, Boljoon, Ginatilan, Malabuyoc, Moalboal, Oslob, Samboan, Santander
6		Antonio Cuenco	December 30, 1965	December 30, 1969	6th	Liberal	Elected in 1965.	1946–1972; Alcantara, Alegria, Badian, Boljoon, Ginatilan, Malabuyoc, Moalboal, Oslob, Samboan, Santander
7		Emerito S. Calderón	December 30, 1969	September 23, 1972	7th	Nacionalista	Elected in 1969. Removed from office after imposition of martial law.	1946–1972; Alcantara, Alegria, Badian, Boljoon, Ginatilan, Malabuyoc, Moalboal, Oslob, Samboan, Santander
District dissolved into the thirteen-seat Region VII's at-large district for the Interim Batasang Pambansa, followed by the six-seat Cebu's at-large district for the Regular Batasang Pambansa.
District re-created February 2, 1987.
8		Ramon D. Durano III	June 30, 1987	June 30, 1998	8th	Independent	Elected in 1987.	1987–present Borbon, Carmen, Catmon, Compostela, Danao, Liloan, Pilar, Poro, San Francisco, Sogod, Tudela
8		Ramon D. Durano III	June 30, 1987	June 30, 1998	8th	Nacionalista	Elected in 1987.	1987–present Borbon, Carmen, Catmon, Compostela, Danao, Liloan, Pilar, Poro, San Francisco, Sogod, Tudela
8		Ramon D. Durano III	June 30, 1987	June 30, 1998	9th	LDP	Re-elected in 1992.	1987–present Borbon, Carmen, Catmon, Compostela, Danao, Liloan, Pilar, Poro, San Francisco, Sogod, Tudela
8		Ramon D. Durano III	June 30, 1987	June 30, 1998	10th	Lakas	Re-elected in 1995.	1987–present Borbon, Carmen, Catmon, Compostela, Danao, Liloan, Pilar, Poro, San Francisco, Sogod, Tudela
9		Ace Durano	June 30, 1998	August 19, 2004	11th	Lakas	Elected in 1998.	1987–present Borbon, Carmen, Catmon, Compostela, Danao, Liloan, Pilar, Poro, San Francisco, Sogod, Tudela
9		Ace Durano	June 30, 1998	August 19, 2004	12th	PROMDI (BAKUD)	Re-elected in 2001.	1987–present Borbon, Carmen, Catmon, Compostela, Danao, Liloan, Pilar, Poro, San Francisco, Sogod, Tudela
9		Ace Durano	June 30, 1998	August 19, 2004	13th	Lakas (BAKUD)	Re-elected in 2004. Resigned on appointment as Secretary of Tourism.	1987–present Borbon, Carmen, Catmon, Compostela, Danao, Liloan, Pilar, Poro, San Francisco, Sogod, Tudela
10		Ramon Durano VI	June 9, 2005	June 30, 2013	13th	NPC (BAKUD)	Elected in 2005 to finish his brother's term.	1987–present Borbon, Carmen, Catmon, Compostela, Danao, Liloan, Pilar, Poro, San Francisco, Sogod, Tudela
10		Ramon Durano VI	June 9, 2005	June 30, 2013	14th	NPC (BAKUD)	Re-elected in 2007.	1987–present Borbon, Carmen, Catmon, Compostela, Danao, Liloan, Pilar, Poro, San Francisco, Sogod, Tudela
10		Ramon Durano VI	June 9, 2005	June 30, 2013	15th	NPC (BAKUD)	Re-elected in 2010.	1987–present Borbon, Carmen, Catmon, Compostela, Danao, Liloan, Pilar, Poro, San Francisco, Sogod, Tudela
(9)		Ace Durano	June 30, 2013	June 30, 2016	16th	Liberal (BAKUD)	Elected in 2013.	1987–present Borbon, Carmen, Catmon, Compostela, Danao, Liloan, Pilar, Poro, San Francisco, Sogod, Tudela
(9)		Ace Durano	June 30, 2013	June 30, 2016	16th	NPC (BAKUD)	Elected in 2013.	1987–present Borbon, Carmen, Catmon, Compostela, Danao, Liloan, Pilar, Poro, San Francisco, Sogod, Tudela
(10)		Ramon Durano VI	June 30, 2016	June 30, 2019	17th	NPC (BAKUD)	Elected in 2016.	1987–present Borbon, Carmen, Catmon, Compostela, Danao, Liloan, Pilar, Poro, San Francisco, Sogod, Tudela
11		Vincent Franco D. Frasco	June 30, 2019	Incumbent	18th	Lakas (1CEBU)	Elected in 2019.	1987–present Borbon, Carmen, Catmon, Compostela, Danao, Liloan, Pilar, Poro, San Francisco, Sogod, Tudela
11		Vincent Franco D. Frasco	June 30, 2019	Incumbent	19th	NUP (1CEBU)	Re-elected in 2022.	1987–present Borbon, Carmen, Catmon, Compostela, Danao, Liloan, Pilar, Poro, San Francisco, Sogod, Tudela
11		Vincent Franco D. Frasco	June 30, 2019	Incumbent	20th	1CEBU	Re-elected in 2025.	1987–present Borbon, Carmen, Catmon, Compostela, Danao, Liloan, Pilar, Poro, San Francisco, Sogod, Tudela

== Election results ==
=== 2025 ===
Candidate	Party	Votes	%
Duke Frasco (incumbent)	National Unity Party	217,303	62.01
Mix Durano	Independent	133,102	37.99
Total		350,405	100.00
Registered voters/turnout		419,986	–
National Unity Party hold			
Source: Commission on Elections

=== 2022 ===
Candidate	Party	Votes	%
Duke Frasco (incumbent)	National Unity Party	222,288	67.18
Ramon Durano VI	Partido Pilipino sa Pagbabago	108,596	32.82
Total		330,884	100.00
Total votes		352,260	–
Registered voters/turnout		397,223	88.68
National Unity Party hold			
Source: Commission on Elections

=== 2019 ===
2019 Philippine House of Representatives elections
Party	Candidate	Votes	%
Lakas	Vincent Franco Frasco	152,435	56.61
NPC	Ramon Durano VI	116,826	43.38
Total votes		269,261	100.00

=== 2016 ===
2016 Philippine House of Representatives elections
Party	Candidate	Votes	%
NPC	Ramon Durano VI	168,650	87.49
UNA	Gilbert Wagas	24,122	12.51
Total votes		192,772	100.00

=== 2013 ===
2013 Philippine House of Representatives elections
Party	Candidate	Votes	%
Liberal	Joseph Ace Durano	162,036	65.11
1CEBU	Alfie Pepito	21,936	8.81
Independent	Gilbert Wagas	10,120	4.07
Valid ballots		194,092	78.00
Invalid or blank votes		54,578	22.00
Total votes		248,850	100.00
Liberal gain from NPC			

=== 2010 ===
2010 Philippine House of Representatives elections
Party	Candidate	Votes	%
NPC	Ramon Durano VI	163,874	78.66
Liberal	Jesus Durano Jr.	24,441	11.73
PMP	Gilbert Wagas	16,057	7.71
Independent	Adonis Montecillo	3,951	1.90
Valid ballots		208,323	86.27
Invalid or blank votes		33,156	13.73
Total votes		241,479	100.00
NPC hold			

=== 2005 special ===
2005 Cebu's 5th congressional district special election
Candidate	Party	Votes	%
Ramon Durano VI	Nationalist People's Coalition	113,589	94.94
Dean Severo Dosado	Pwersa ng Masang Pilipino	4,345	3.63
Wilfredo Tuadles	Independent	1,711	1.43
Total		119,645	100.00
Registered voters/turnout			48.56
Majority		109,244	91.31
Nationalist People's Coalition gain from Lakas–NUCD–UMDP			

== See also ==
- Legislative districts of Cebu
