= Barug Alang sa Kauswagan ug Demokrasya =

Political party in the Philippines

- Abbreviation: BAKUD
- President: Ace Durano
- Chairperson: Ramon "Nito" D. Durano III
- Secretary: Ramon Durano VI
- Founded: 2001
- Headquarters: Danao City, Cebu
- Ideology: Localism
- National affiliation: NPC (2015–present); Liberal (2012–2015)
- Colours: Red; Blue; White
- House of Representatives (5th District seats): 0 / 1
- Provincial Board Members (5th District seats): 0 / 2
- City Mayor (Danao City): 1 / 1
- Sangguniang Panglungsod (Danao City): 10 / 10
- Municipal Mayors (5th District seats): 0 / 10
- Sangguniang Bayan (5th District seats): 3 / 80

Website
- www.bakudparty.com

Barug Alang sa Kauswagan ug Demokrasya (English: Stand for Development and Democracy) commonly known as BAKUD, is a local political party based in Cebu's 5th congressional district, Philippines. It is a political party run by the Durano family of Cebu formed in 2001.

BAKUD is currently affiliated with the Nationalist People's Coalition since 2018.

== History ==
In the 2016 elections, the party endorsed the tandem of Senator Grace Poe and Senator Francis "Chiz" Escudero for president and Vice President respectively. They also endorsed the tandem of incumbent Governor Hilario "Junjun" Davide III and BAKUD stalwart, incumbent Vice Governor Agnes Magpale for Governor and Vice Governor of Cebu respectively.

In the 2019 elections, the party endorsed Grace Poe for senator. Following the endorsement, Poe supported the gubernatorial bid of Agnes Magpale, who lost the election. She also endorsed the vice-gubernatorial bid of Ramon Durano VI, who also lost. Poe stated, "I just wanted to say that it's important for us to be able to look up to people and to be able to admire individuals with integrity and also with the passion to serve".

The party also created an alliance with the Nationalist People's Coalition for the 2019 elections. President Durano stated, “For me, it doesn’t matter, kay kita dinhi sa Bakud as a local party, we are very strong". Durano was also appointed the provincial chairman for NPC.

During the 2022 presidential election, BAKUD endorsed UniTeam of former Senator Bongbong Marcos and Davao City Mayor Sara Duterte. In a press conference held by BAKUD, led by Mayor Nito Durano, he announced the party endorsement. Durano cited the history of friendship shared by his family and the Marcoses as the compelling reason that pushed BAKUD to throw its support behind the son of the late dictator Ferdinand Marcos and President Rodrigo Duterte's daughter. “BBM is a very dear friend to the party, most especially to me. I have known BBM for more than four decades. Being in the company of BBM, I have known him as a very good person,” Ramonito III said.

During the 2022 Cebu gubernatorial elections, BAKUD endorsed the candidacy for Governor of Ace Durano against incumbent Gwen Garcia. Garcia won the gubernatorial race with a landslide victory against Ace Durano.

=== 2025 Cebu local elections ===
In the recently concluded 2025 Philippine midterm elections, BAKUD and the Durano clan of Danao City are the only political party, and incumbent government officials, to back the candidacy of Governor-elect Pam Baricuatro. Baricuatro won with a landslide victory, garnering over 1.1 million votes against Garcia's 765,051 votes. In the fifth congressional district, incumbent Danao City Mayor Mix Durano challenged incumbent representative Duke Frasco. Mix lost, with Frasco successfully reelected for his third and final term.

== Notable members ==
- Agnes Magpale - former Cebu Vice Governor (2011–2019), and Provincial Board Member from the Fifth District of Cebu (1992–2001; 2004–2011)
- Ramon "Nito" D. Durano III - incumbent Danao City Mayor, former Vice Governor of Cebu (1980–1984), former member of Batasang Pambansa from Cebu (1984–1986), former Representative of Cebu's Fifth Congressional District (1987–1998) Danao City Mayor (2001–2010; 2013–2022; 2025-present), and former Danao City Vice Mayor (2010–2013; 2022–2025)
- Ace Durano - Cebu Provincial Administrator (2025–present), former Representative of Cebu's Fifth Congressional District (1998–2004; 2013–2016), and former Secretary of the Department of Tourism under the administration of former President Gloria Macapagal Arroyo (2004–2010)

== See also ==
- One Cebu
- Bando Osmeña - Pundok Kauswagan
- Partido Barug
- Kugi Uswag Sugbo
