= Adelino Sitoy =

Filipino lawyer, politician, and regional language advocate (1936–2021)

Adelino B. Sitoy
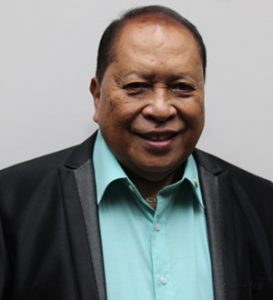

Secretary of Presidential Legislative Liaison Office
- In office September 2016 – April 15, 2021
- Succeeded by: Luzverfeda Estepa Pascual

Mayor of Cordova
- In office June 30, 2007 – June 30, 2016
- Preceded by: Arleigh Jay C. Sitoy
- Succeeded by: Mary Therese Cho

Vice Mayor of Cordova
- In office June 30, 2016 – September 2016

Member of the Batasang Pambansa from Cebu
- In office July 23, 1984 – March 25, 1986 Serving with Emerito Calderon, Nenita Cortes-Daluz, Ramon Durano III, Regalado Maambong and Luisito Patalinjug

Personal details
- Born: Adelino Baguio Sitoy; February 6, 1936 Cebu, Philippines
- Died: April 15, 2021 (aged 85) Cebu City, Cebu, Philippines
- Party: Liberal (2012–2016)
- Other political affiliations: Lakas–CMD (2008–2012); KAMPI (2007–2008); KBL (1984–1986)
- Children: Arleigh Jay C. Sitoy, Mary Therese
- Parent(s): Maximo Menguito Sitoy (Father), Ramona Amores Baguio (Mother)
- Education: Abellana National Schoo, University of San Carlos School of Law
- Occupation: Politician
- Profession: Lawyer

Adelino Baguio Sitoy (February 6, 1936 – April 15, 2021), also known as Addy Sitoy, was a Filipino politician, lawyer, and Cebuano language advocate from Cebu, Philippines. He served as a Secretary of the Presidential Legislative Liaison Office (PLLO) under the Duterte administration from September 2016 until his death. He was the elected vice mayor of Cordova, a position from which he resigned at the time of his appointment at the PLLO. The Duterte administration, in tribute upon his death, praised him for facilitating the passage of laws, but some lawmakers allegedly blamed his office for failing to provide timely coordination in forwarding certain pieces of legislation such as the bill for security of tenure (anti-endo) and coconut farmer trust fund, a bill which was vetoed and then later signed into law by Duterte. Sitoy reportedly claimed the office was not invited for meetings, and then he admitted that comments from the executive branch of the government on the bills were relayed late.

Sitoy was born on February 6, 1936. After he obtained a law degree from University of San Carlos, he attended University of Southern Philippines for his Masters of Law Degree. He was the first President of the Integrated Bar of the Philippines Cebu Chapter. He also had teaching position in various universities in Cebu and later became the dean of the College of Law of the University of Cebu from 2002 to 2007. From 1963 to 1969, he was Cebu City's prosecutor. He also was voted to Cordova's legislative council, and to the Sangguniang Panlalawigan of Cebu (Cebu Provincial Board) from 1975 to 1984. During the regime of Ferdinand Marcos, he was an assemblyman from 1984 to 1986. From 1995 to 1998, he was appointed as Commissioner of the Cebu Ports Authority (CPA). He was elected mayor of Cordova from 2007 to 2016.

Known for his support for the regional language, Cebuano, he was the president of the writers' group Lubas sa Dagang Bisaya (Ludabi) and a founder of Akademiyang Bisaya, one of the organizations responsible for the publication of Cebuano-English dictionary.

He died of cardiac arrest on April 15, 2021, aged 85, a few days after he underwent angioplasty and weeks after he was positive with COVID-19.
