= Ramon Durano VI =

Filipino businessman and politician (born 1969)

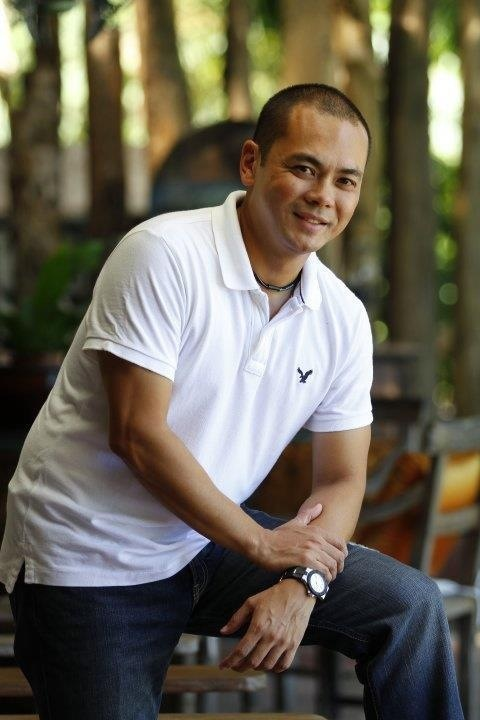
- Durano in 2013

Member of the Philippine House of Representatives from Cebu's 5th District
- In office June 30, 2016 – June 30, 2019
- Preceded by: Joseph Ace Durano
- Succeeded by: Vincent Franco D. Frasco
- In office June 9, 2005 – June 30, 2013
- Preceded by: Joseph Ace Durano
- Succeeded by: Joseph Ace Durano

Vice Mayor of Danao
- In office June 30, 2013 – June 30, 2016
- Preceded by: Ramon Durano III
- Succeeded by: Thomas Mark H. Durano

Personal details
- Born: February 7, 1969 (age 57) Cebu City, Philippines
- Party: PPP (2021–present); BAKUD (local party; 2005–present)
- Other political affiliations: NPC (2005–2021)
- Relations: Ace Durano (brother)
- Parent(s): Ramon "Nito" Durano III; Elizabeth H. Durano
- Education: College of Notre Dame; Asian Institute of Management
- Occupation: Businessman, politician

Ramon Hotchkiss Durano VI (born February 7, 1969), also known as Red Durano, is a Filipino businessman and politician. A member of the Partido Pilipino sa Pagbabago, he was elected to the House of Representatives of the Philippines in a 2005 special election, succeeding his brother Joseph Ace Durano as the Representative of the Fifth District of Cebu, following his appointment as Secretary of the Department of Tourism.

== Early life ==
Red Durano was born on February 7, 1969 to politician Ramon "Nito" D. Durano III and Elizabeth Hotchkiss Durano. He is the older brother of politician Joseph Felix Mari ("Ace", born 1970), and is the grandson of Ramon M. Durano Sr. (1905–1988), both of whom also served as Cebu congressmen.

He is also a cousin to Vice President Sara Duterte.

== Political career ==
During the 15th Congress, Durano served as chairperson of the House Committee on Economic Affairs. He voted against the RH Bill in December 2012. During the 17th Congress he replaced Evelina Escudero as the chairperson of the House Committee on Basic Education and Culture in March 2017, having voted in favor of the death penalty bill while Escudero voted against it. Additionally, Durano was also the vice chairperson of the House Committee on Inter-Parliamentary Relations and Diplomacy and the House Committee on Ways and Means.

He is known as the "Father of Cooperativism" in the fifth district of Cebu. As a political figure, he is the Party President of the local political party, Barug Alang sa Kauswagan ug Demokrasya (BAKUD). Under his leadership, the party has wielded solid support from among the residents of the 5th District of Cebu which comprises Liloan, Compostela, Carmen, Cebu, Catmon, Cebu, Sogod, Borbon, San Francisco, Poro, Tudela, Pilar and Danao. He has authored various legislation aimed at socio-economic development particularly the reclassification of the Camotes Islands from timberland into alienable and disposable in order to usher in unprecedented economic growth. He has extended assistance to families in need especially during medical emergencies. He allocated appropriations at the Vicente Sotto Memorial Medical Center, Danao Provincial Hospital, Everseley Childs Sanitarium. He also extends scholarship to deserving college students and free skills training through the Technical Education and Skills Development Authority. He has ensured the building of roads and community centers in the 210 barangays of his district.

Red Durano as he is fondly called by the people finished his bachelor's degree from the College of Notre Dame in Belmont, California. He proceeded to take up a master's degree in Business from the Asian Institute of Management. He took over the family business and eventually made his way to public service. He served for three years as the Vice Mayor of Danao from 2013 to 2016.

In 2019, he lost his re-election bid to Lakas–CMD candidate Vincent "Duke" Frasco, although he contested the results before the House of Representatives Electoral Tribunal. Durano attempted to run for congress once again in 2022, but was still defeated by Frasco.

== Personal life ==
Durano, coming from a political dynasty, is the son of Danao Mayor Ramon Durano III, who also served for nine years as representative of the same district. His grandfather Ramon Durano Sr. also became congressman of Cebu's first district from 1949 to 1972, and was a fervent supporter of President Ferdinand Marcos.

Preceded by Joseph Ace Durano	Representative, 5th District of Cebu; 2005–2013	Succeeded by Joseph Ace Durano
Preceded by Joseph Ace Durano	Representative, 5th District of Cebu; 2016–2019	Succeeded by Duke Frasco
