= Lakambini Reluya =

Filipino politician

The Honorable Lakambini Reluya
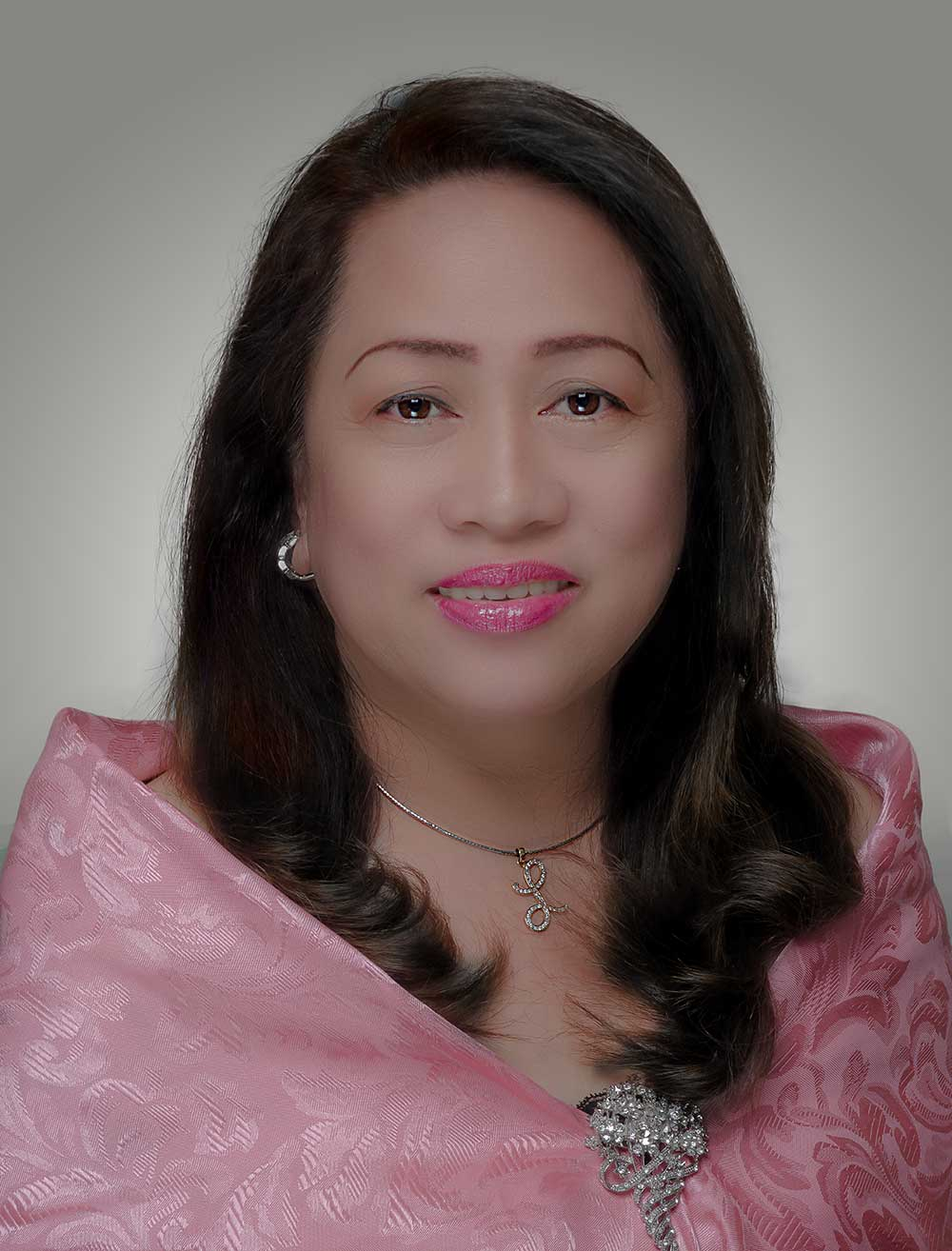

Mayor of San Fernando
- In office June 30, 2013 – June 30, 2022
- Vice Mayor: Ricci Regen Reluya
- Preceded by: Antonio Canoy
- Succeeded by: Mytha Canoy

Personal details
- Born: Lakambini Generans Reluya; September 21, 1965 (age 60) Manila, Philippines
- Party: Nacionalista
- Spouse(s): Ricardo Reluya, Jr.
- Children: Ricci Regen Reluya; Shanylle Regen Reluya; Travis Regen Reluya

Lakambini "Neneth" Generans Reluya is a Filipino politician from San Fernando, Cebu, Philippines. She previously served as the mayor of San Fernando from 2013 to 2022. Reluya's husband, Ricardo Reluya, Jr., filed his candidacy for vice mayor in the 2019 elections but was killed in an ambush on January 22, 2019. Their son, Ricci Regen Reluya, was placed in as a substitute and eventually won as vice mayor.
