= Mary Therese Cho =

Filipino politician

The Honorable Mary Therese Cho

Mayor of Cordova
- In office June 30, 2016 – June 30, 2022
- Vice Mayor: Ximgil Dino Sitoy
- Preceded by: Adelino Sitoy
- Succeeded by: Cesar Suan

Personal details
- Born: Mary Therese Sitoy; June 20, 1979 (age 46) Cordova, Cebu, Philippines
- Party: PFP (2024–present)
- Other political affiliations: PDP (2016–2024); Liberal (2015–2016)
- Spouse: Cho Bong Hwan

Mary Therese "Teche" Sitoy-Cho is a Filipina politician from Cordova, Cebu, Philippines. She previously served as the mayor of Cordova. She is the daughter of former Presidential Adviser on Legislative Affairs Adelino Sitoy, who also previously served as the town's mayor.
