= Ace Durano =

Filipino lawyer and politician (born 1970)

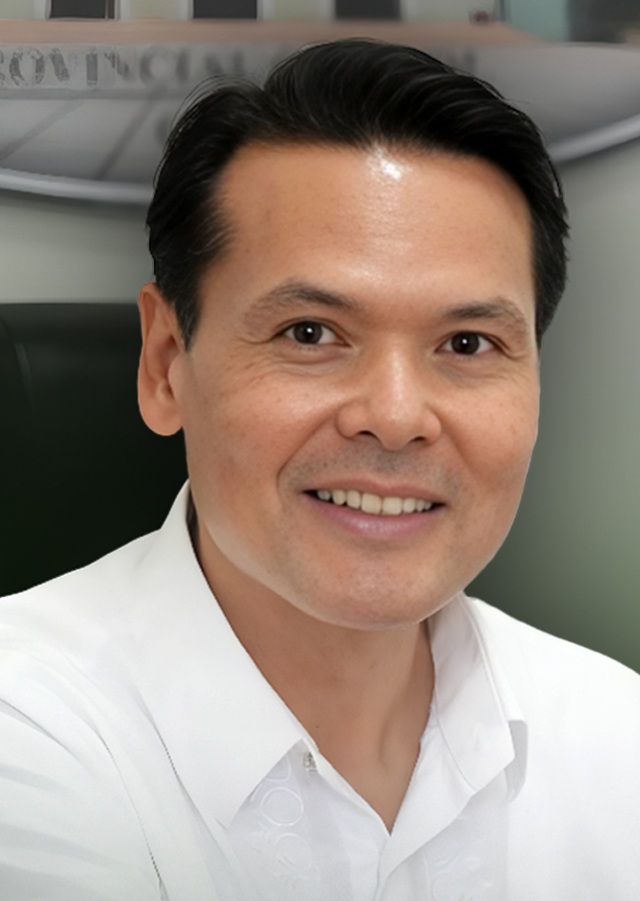
- Durano in 2025

Provincial Administrator of Cebu
- Incumbent
- Assumed office June 30, 2025
- Governor: Pamela S. Baricuatro

Member of the Philippine House of Representatives from Cebu's 5th district
- In office June 30, 2013 – June 30, 2016
- Preceded by: Ramon Durano VI
- Succeeded by: Ramon Durano VI
- In office June 30, 1998 – November 29, 2004
- Preceded by: Ramon D. Durano III
- Succeeded by: Ramon Durano VI

13th Secretary of Tourism
- In office November 30, 2004 – June 30, 2010
- President: Gloria Macapagal Arroyo
- Preceded by: Roberto Pagdanganan
- Succeeded by: Alberto Lim

Personal details
- Born: Joseph Felix Mari Hotchkiss Durano; April 3, 1970 (age 56) Cebu City, Philippines
- Party: PPP (2021–present); BAKUD (local party; 2001–present)
- Other political affiliations: NPC (2015–2021); Liberal (2012–2015); Lakas (1998–2001; 2004–2012); PROMDI (2001–2004)
- Relations: Rodrigo Duterte (second cousin once removed); Sara Duterte (third cousin); Paolo Duterte (third cousin); Sebastian Duterte (third cousin)
- Education: University of Redlands (BA); Ateneo de Manila University (LL.B)
- Occupation: Politician
- Profession: Lawyer

Joseph Felix Mari "Ace" Hotchkiss Durano (born April 3, 1970) is a Filipino lawyer and politician serving as the provincial administrator of Cebu since 2025. He previously served as Secretary of Tourism and general manager of the Philippine Tourism Authority (PTA) in the administration of President Gloria Macapagal Arroyo. He also served twice as the representative of Cebu's fifth district: from 1998 to 2004 and from 2013 to 2016.

== Early life ==
Durano was born to Ramon "Nito" Duterte Durano III, a mayor of Danao, Cebu, who was also a second cousin of former president Rodrigo Duterte.

== Political career ==
He also served twice as the Representative of Cebu's 5th congressional district: from 1998 to 2004 and from 2013 to 2016.

He was one of the youngest to be elected representative to the 11th congress (1998-2001). He was an Assistant Majority Floor Leader and Vice Chairman of the Committee on Trade and Industry during that time.

In the 2022 local elections, Durano challenged the incumbent governor Gwendolyn Garcia for the governorship of Cebu and lost. He ran alongside incumbent vice governor Hilario Davide III as his running mate.

In 2025, Durano was appointed provincial administrator of Cebu by governor Pam Baricuatro.

== Controversies ==
Durano was convicted of graft by the Sandiganbayan over the development of the Department of Tourism 2009 wall calendar, worth PhP 2.7 million, without initiating a public bidding process. His motion for reconsideration was denied by the court in February 2022. The case is currently under appeal before the Supreme Court.
