= Boljoon =

Municipality in Cebu, Philippines

- Municipality
- Municipality of Boljoon
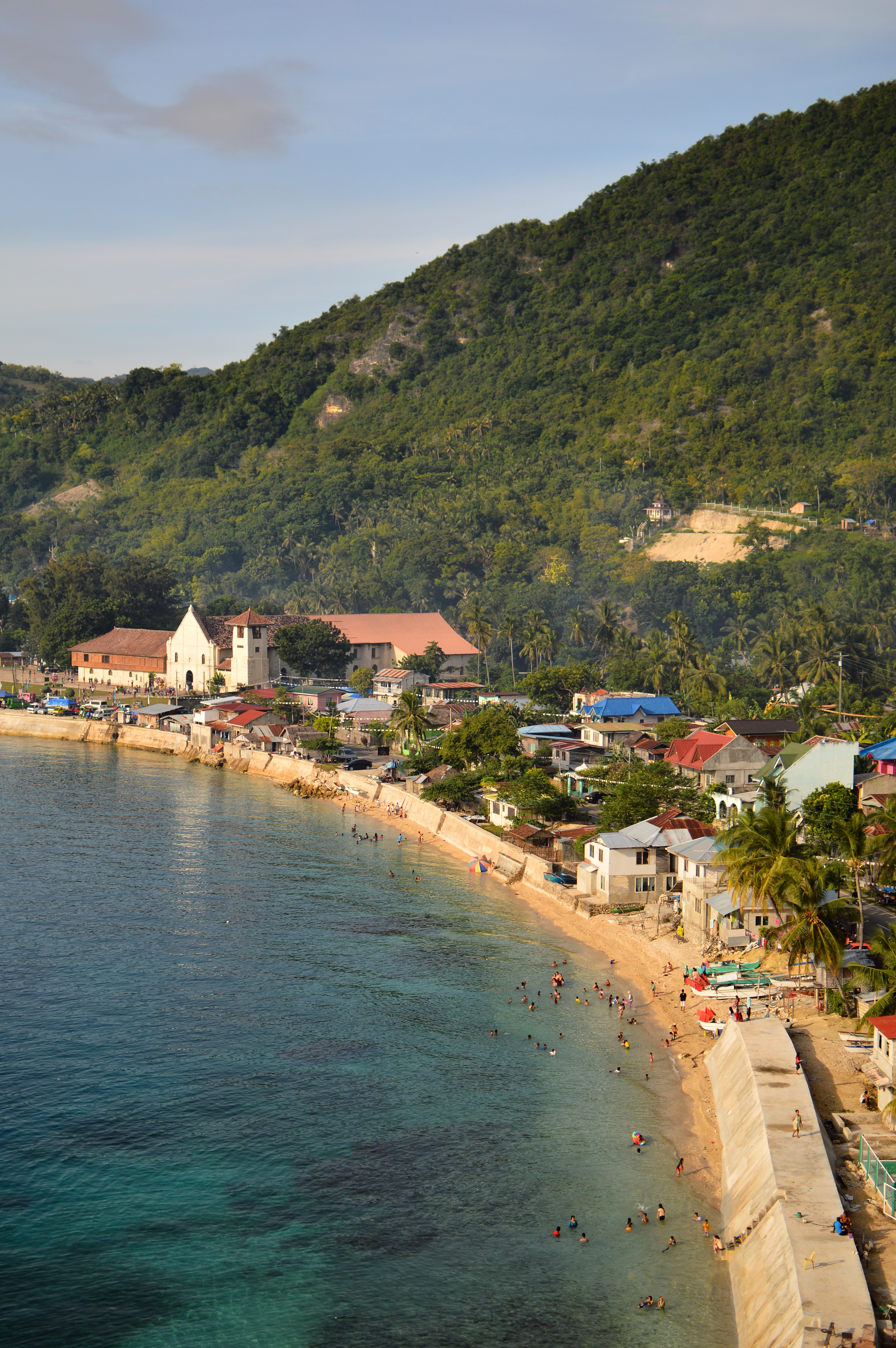
- Boljoon

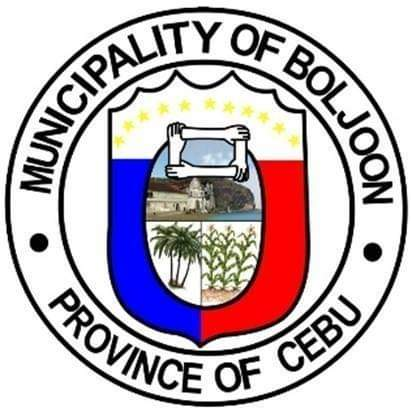
- Seal

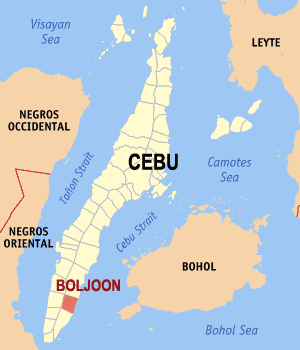
- Map of Cebu with Boljoon highlighted
- Interactive map of Boljoon
- Location within the Philippines
- Coordinates: 9°38′N 123°26′E
- Country: Philippines
- Region: Central Visayas
- Province: Cebu
- District: 2nd district
- Founded: 1600
- Barangays: 11 (see Barangays)

Government
  - Type: Sangguniang Bayan
  - Mayor: Joie Genesse N. Derama (1Cebu)
  - Vice Mayor: Feliberta F. Mubarak Obaid (1Cebu)
  - Representative: Edsel Galeos (Lakas)
  - Municipal Council: Members: Proculogenus D. Navarro; Merlou D. Derama; Anjo E. Nicanor; Ramonito D. Fedillaga; Marvin Ian E. Niere; Darrel John R. Felices; Ervin M. Villanueva; Lindzey A. Romero
  - Electorate: 12,247 voters (2025)

Area
  - Total: 117.00 km^{2} (45.17 sq mi)
- Elevation: 163 m (535 ft)
- Highest elevation: 744 m (2,441 ft)
- Lowest elevation: 0 m (0 ft)

Population (2024 census)
  - Total: 17,153
  - Density: 146.61/km^{2} (379.71/sq mi)
  - Households: 4,106

Economy
  - Income class: 4th municipal income class
  - Poverty incidence: 25.3% (2023)
  - Revenue: ₱ 163.5 million (2024)
  - Assets: ₱ 530.5 million (2024)
  - Expenditure: ₱ 143.6 million (2024)
  - Liabilities: ₱ 129.4 million (2024)

Service provider
  - Electricity: Cebu 1 Electric Cooperative (CEBECO 1)
- Time zone: UTC+8 (PST)
- ZIP code: 6024
- PSGC: 072212000
- IDD : area code: +63 (0)32
- Native languages: Cebuano; Tagalog
- Website: www.boljoon.com

Boljoon, officially the Municipality of Boljoon (Cebuano: Lungsod sa Boljoon; Tagalog: Bayan ng Boljoon), is a municipality in the province of Cebu, Philippines. According to the 2024 census, it has a population of 17,153 people.

== Geography ==
Boljo-on, as locally called, has a total land area of 117.00 square kilometres (45.17 sq mi). It is 103 kilometres (64 mi) from Cebu City.

Boljoon is bordered to the north by the town of Alcoy, to the west are the towns of Malabuyoc, to the east is the Cebu Strait, and to the south is the town of Oslob.

=== Barangays ===
Political map of Boljoon

Boljoon is politically subdivided into 11 barangays. Each barangay consists of puroks and some have sitios. Among its barangays, 7 are coastal while the rest are landlocked.

PSGC	Barangay	Population			±% p.a.	
		2024		2010		
072212008	Arbor	7.2%	1,235	1,035	▴	1.23%
072212001	Baclayan	2.9%	503	438	▴	0.96%
072212002	El Pardo	20.3%	3,483	2,953	▴	1.15%
072212003	Granada	8.7%	1,484	1,046	▴	2.44%
072212004	Lower Becerril	9.1%	1,563	1,153	▴	2.12%
072212009	Lunop	5.7%	984	874	▴	0.82%
072212010	Nangka	4.0%	689	590	▴	1.08%
072212005	Poblacion	24.3%	4,169	3,709	▴	0.81%
072212006	San Antonio	6.1%	1,039	1,125	▾	−0.55%
072212011	South Granada	5.5%	941	813	▴	1.01%
072212007	Upper Becerril	8.4%	1,435	1,291	▴	0.73%
	Total		17,153	15,027	▴	0.92%

=== Climate ===
Climate data for Boljoon, Cebu
Month	Jan	Feb	Mar	Apr	May	Jun	Jul	Aug	Sep	Oct	Nov	Dec	Year
Mean daily maximum °C (°F)	29 (84)	29 (84)	30 (86)	32 (90)	31 (88)	30 (86)	30 (86)	30 (86)	30 (86)	29 (84)	29 (84)	29 (84)	30 (86)
Mean daily minimum °C (°F)	23 (73)	23 (73)	23 (73)	24 (75)	25 (77)	25 (77)	24 (75)	24 (75)	24 (75)	24 (75)	24 (75)	23 (73)	24 (75)
Average precipitation mm (inches)	35 (1.4)	28 (1.1)	38 (1.5)	51 (2.0)	125 (4.9)	195 (7.7)	194 (7.6)	173 (6.8)	180 (7.1)	192 (7.6)	121 (4.8)	64 (2.5)	1,396 (55)
Average rainy days	9.2	8.2	9.9	11.3	22.5	27.3	28.0	27.2	27.1	26.9	19.7	12.7	230
Source: Meteoblue (Use with caution: this is modeled/calculated data, not measured locally.)

== Demographics ==
Population census of Boljoon
Year	Pop.	±% p.a.
1903	7,299	—
1918	9,121	+1.50%
1939	10,087	+0.48%
1948	11,299	+1.27%
1960	9,151	−1.74%
1970	11,049	+1.90%
1975	11,359	+0.56%
1980	10,735	−1.12%
1990	11,646	+0.82%
1995	12,318	+1.06%
2000	13,380	+1.79%
2007	14,877	+1.47%
2010	15,027	+0.37%
2015	16,344	+1.61%
2020	17,525	+1.48%
2024	17,153	−0.51%
Source: Philippine Statistics Authority

== Economy ==
Poverty incidence of Boljoon (%)

Source: Philippine Statistics Authority

== Boljoon Church ==
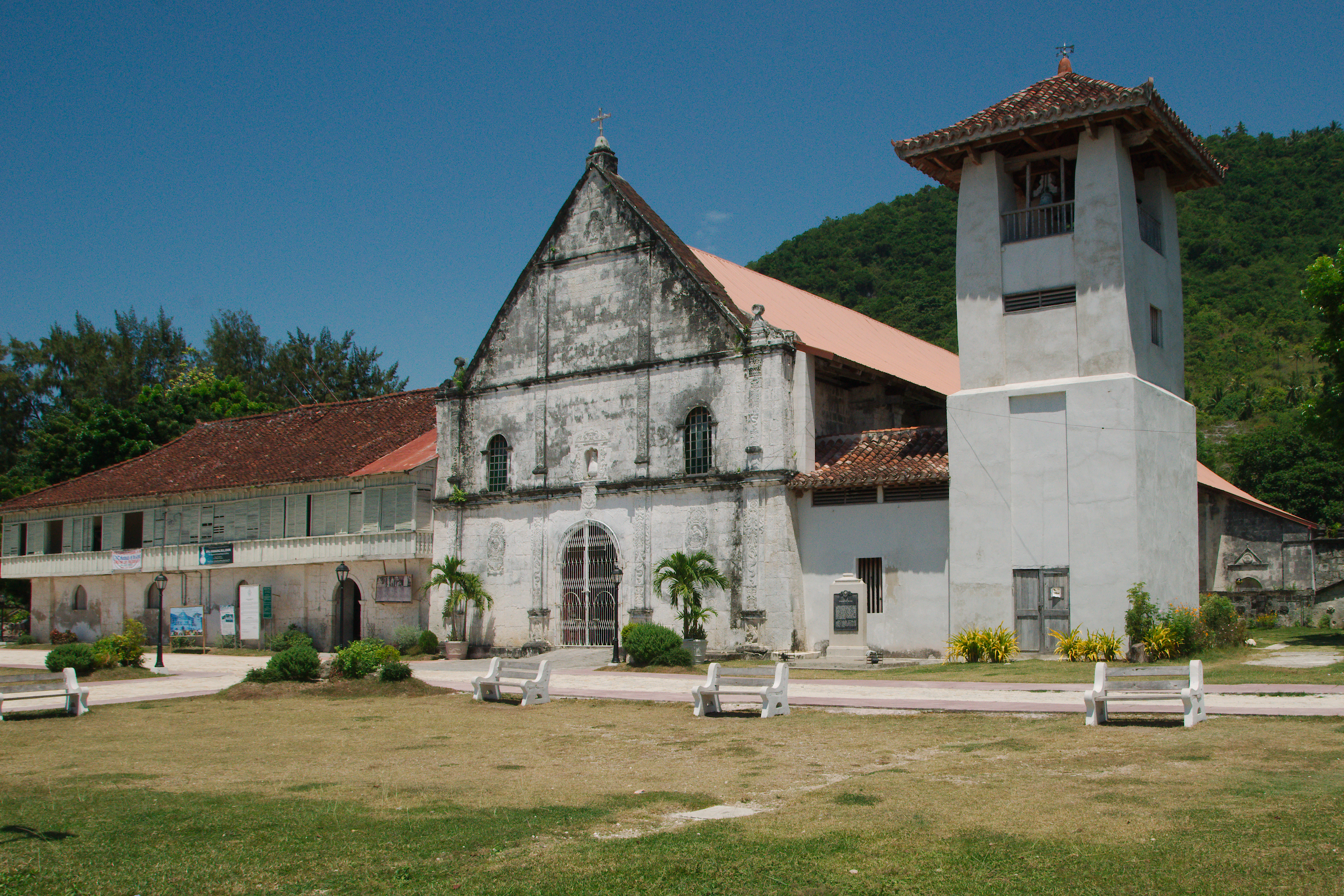
Church of Patrocinio de Maria

The Archdiocesan Shrine of Patrocinio de Maria Santisima shows old and intricate carvings and bas-reliefs. It is in a pseudo-baroque rococo style. It has a main nave, a transcript, and twenty-eight pillars which support the walls. The walls are as thick as the pillars which are two metres (6 ft 7 in) thick and made of mortar and lime.

Boljoon became a visita of Carcar founded according to some authors in 1599. It became an independent vicariate on October 31, 1690, and on April 5, 1692, Fr. Nicolas de la Cuadra was appointed as prior. Because of the lack of priests, the church was turned over to the Jesuits on September 27, 1737, following the recommendation of the intermediate chapter of 1732. In the year 1747, the General of the Augustinians Order proposed the recovery of the parishes left off in the Visayas.

Boljoon's earlier building had been destroyed in a raid in 1782, and its pastor Fr. Ambrosio Otero started rebuilding the following year. The work was continued by Fr. Manuel Cordero in 1794 but when Fr. Julian arrived, the work was not yet completed. He decided to build a blockhouse 120 by 80 metres (390 ft × 260 ft) on which artillery was mounted, and he enclosed the church perimeter with a wall. He finally completed the church. The church and the adjoining convento were restored by Fr. Leandro Moran (1920–1948) the last Augustinian friar to be assigned to Boljoon.

In 1999 the National Historical Institute declared it a National Historical Landmark. The following year, the National Museum declared it as a National Cultural Treasure. The then Nuestra Señora de Patrocinio Parish Church withstood the 7.2 magnitude earthquake in 2013 which affected Bohol and Cebu.

The Boljoon Church is currently in the tentative list for UNESCO World Heritage Sites under the Baroque Churches of the Philippines (Extension). A proposal has been suggested by scholars to make a separate UNESCO inclusion for the Old Centre of Boljoon which includes the Boljoon Church. The same would be made for other churches listed in UNESCO's tentative sites, where each town plaza and surrounding heritage buildings would be added. No government agency has yet to take action on the proposal. The Venerated Marian Image enshrined was Granted a Decree of Canonical Coronation by Pope Francis. The Coronation Rites was held on April 23, 2022

=== Discovery of 16th-century artefacts ===
In 2009, Japanese and Filipino archaeologists from the Sumitomo Foundation-funded Boljoon Archaeological Project conducted by the University of San Carlos with the National Museum of the Philippines, discovered ancient Japanese pottery that has been believed to have been in existence since the early 18th century. The ancient Japanese pottery that was discovered there, has proven that there was activity of trading activity between Japan and Cebu Island Philippines going back to the 16th century.

In February 2008, archaeologists discovered 26 human remains (with china plates on top of heads) and 16th-century artefacts beneath the parvis of Boljoon Church.

== Education ==
The public schools in the town of Boljoon are administered by one school district under the Schools Division of Cebu Province.

Elementary schools:

- Arbor Elementary School — Arbor
- Baclayan Elementary School — Baclayan
- Becerril Elementary School — Upper Becerril
- Boljoon Central Elementary School — N. Bacalso Avenue, Poblacion
- Caipilan Elementary School — Sitio Danao, Lower Becerril
- El Pardo Elementary School — El Pardo
- Granada Elementary School — Granada
- Lunop Elementary School — Lunop
- Nangka Elementary School — Nangka
- Pondohan Elementary School — Sitio Pondohan, Upper Becerril

High schools:

- Boljoon National High School — N. Bacalso Avenue, Lower Becerril
- El Pardo National High School — El Pardo
- Lunop National High School — Lunop

Integrated schools:

- San Antonio Integrated School — San Antonio

== Notable personalities ==
- Eula Caballero - actress
