= Ramon Durano III =

Filipino politician (born 1948)

The Honorable Ramon Durano III
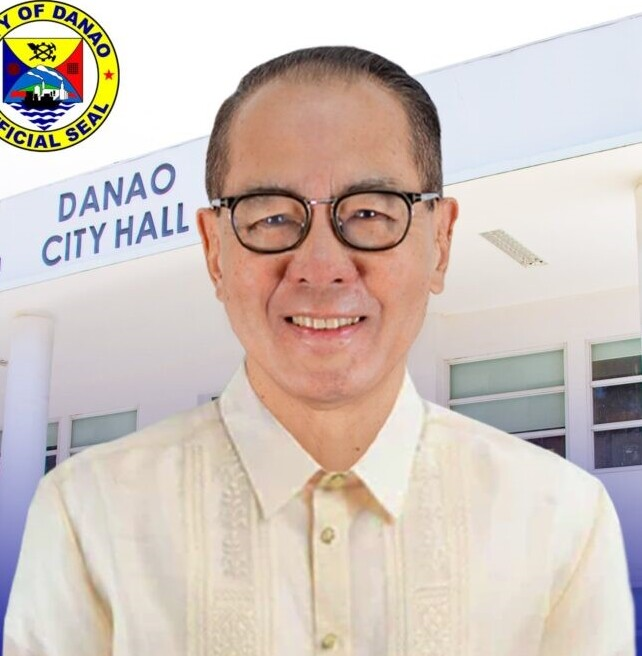
- Official portrait, 2025

Mayor of Danao
- Incumbent
- Assumed office June 30, 2025
- Vice Mayor: Carmen Remedios H. Durano
- Preceded by: Thomas Mark Durano
- In office June 30, 2013 – June 30, 2022
- Vice Mayor: Ramon Durano VI (2013–2016); Thomas Mark Durano (2016–2022)
- Preceded by: Ramon "Boy" Durano, Jr.
- Succeeded by: Thomas Mark Durano
- In office June 30, 2001 – June 30, 2010
- Preceded by: Jesus D. Durano
- Succeeded by: Ramon "Boy" Durano, Jr.

Vice Mayor of Danao City
- In office June 30, 2022 – June 30, 2025
- Preceded by: Thomas Mark H. Durano
- Succeeded by: Carmen Remedios H. Durano
- In office June 30, 2010 – June 30, 2013
- Succeeded by: Ramon Durano VI

Member of the Philippine House of Representatives from Cebu's 5th district
- In office June 30, 1987 – June 30, 1998
- Preceded by: District re-created Post last held by Emerito S. Calderón
- Succeeded by: Ace Durano

Member of the Batasang Pambansa from Cebu
- In office July 23, 1984 – March 25, 1986 Serving with Emerito Calderon, Nenita Cortes-Daluz, Regalado Maambong, Luisito Patalinjug and Adelino Sitoy

Vice Governor of Cebu
- In office 1980–1984
- Governor: Eduardo Gullas
- Preceded by: Vacant; Post last held by Salutario J. Fernandez
- Succeeded by: Beatriz Durano-Calderon

Personal details
- Born: Ramon Duterte Durano III; July 7, 1948 (age 78) Cebu City, Cebu, Philippines
- Party: BAKUD (2001–present)
- Other political affiliations: See list: Liberal (2012–2015); Lakas (1995–2009); LDP (1992–1995); Nacionalista (1988–1992); Independent (1986–1988); KBL (1980–1986)
- Spouse: Elizabeth Hotchkiss
- Relations: Rodrigo Duterte (cousin)
- Children: Ace Durano; Ramon Durano VI
- Education: University of San Francisco
- Profession: Politician

Ramon "Nito" Duterte Durano III (born July 7, 1948) is a Filipino politician from Danao, Cebu, Philippines. He currently served as the mayor of Danao since 2025; he previously served in the same position from 2013 to 2022 and from 2001 to 2010. Durano also previously served as vice mayor along with his brother, former mayor Ramon "Boy" Durano Jr.

Durano is the cousin of former president Rodrigo Duterte.
