= Malabuyoc =

Municipality in Cebu, Philippines

Malabuyoc Buyoc
- Municipality
- Municipality of Malabuyoc
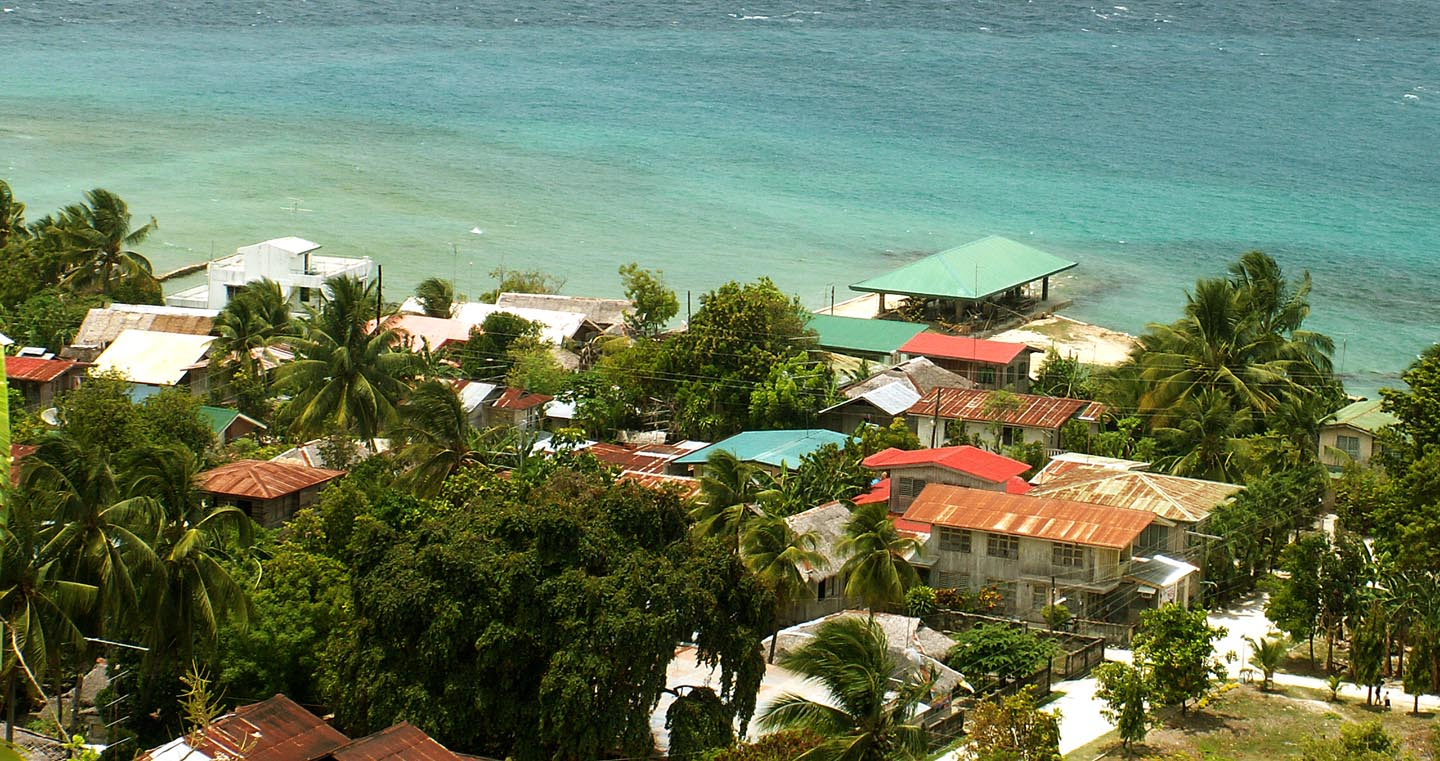
- Malabuyoc, Cebu

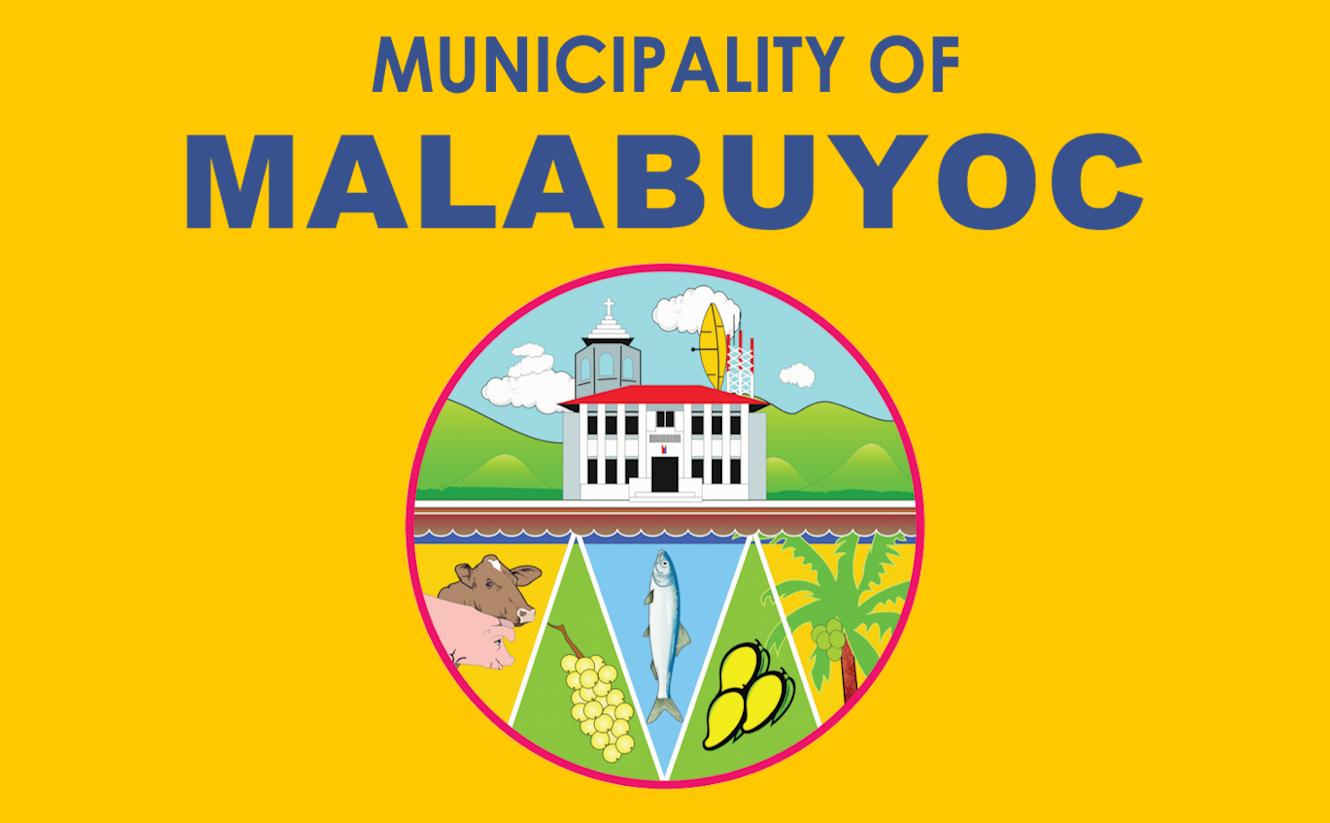
- Flag
- Etymology: Buyoc
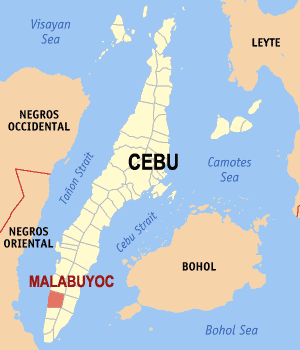
- Map of Cebu with Malabuyoc highlighted
- Interactive map of Malabuyoc
- Location within the Philippines
- Coordinates: 9°39′N 123°20′E
- Country: Philippines
- Region: Central Visayas
- Province: Cebu
- District: 7th district
- Founded: 1832
- Barangays: 14 (see Barangays)

Government
  - Type: Sangguniang Bayan
  - Mayor: Erlinda Q. Piedad
  - Vice Mayor: Anna Devorah D. Allosada
  - Representative: Peter John D. Calderon
  - Municipal Council: Members: Manolito E. Quiñanola; Niño Xavier G. Allosada; Phil Edreeve A. Kho; Emmanuel C. Aguelo; Romil V. Allera; Nestor G. Pimentel; Concesa T. Kho; Macephil D. Macion Jr.
  - Electorate: 15,074 voters (2025)

Area
  - Total: 69.27 km^{2} (26.75 sq mi)
- Elevation: 152 m (499 ft)
- Highest elevation: 718 m (2,356 ft)
- Lowest elevation: 0 m (0 ft)

Population (2024 census)
  - Total: 20,378
  - Households: 4,463
- Demonym: Malabuyocanon

Economy
  - Income class: 4th municipal income class
  - Poverty incidence: 31.47% (2023)
  - Revenue: ₱ 124.3 million (2024)
  - Assets: ₱ 427 million (2024)
  - Expenditure: ₱ 57.11 million (2024)
  - Liabilities: ₱ 45.78 million (2024)

Service provider
  - Electricity: Cebu 1 Electric Cooperative (CEBECO 1)
- Time zone: UTC+8 (PST)
- ZIP code: 6029
- PSGC: 072229000
- IDD : area code: +63 (0)32
- Native languages: Cebuano; Tagalog

Malabuyoc, officially the Municipality of Malabuyoc (Cebuano: Lungsod sa Malabuyoc; Tagalog: Bayan ng Malabuyoc), is a municipality in the province of Cebu, Philippines. According to the 2024 census, it has a population of 20,378 people.

== History ==
According to a popular story, once Malabuyoc grew plenty of fruit trees like mangoes, lanzones, cacaos, and others. So much that the branches of the trees bent down (buyoc in Visaya) under their weight. On account of this, the place came to be called Buyoc.

Malabuyoc is the mother town for Alegria and a contributor town to Ginatilan. Some barangays of both Alegria and Ginatilan were originated from Malabuyoc. Almost half or more than half of the current jurisdictions of Alegria and Ginatilan respectively originally belonged to the jurisdiction of Malabuyoc. If the town of Ginatilan had not been created, Malabuyoc would have been the claimant for the 2nd Filipino Saint: Pedro Calungsod

It was officially established as the original municipality of Alegria and Ginatilan. Though the municipality of Ginatilan is a daughter town of Samboan, Malabuyoc was a contributor to Ginatilan. Malabuyoc separated its parish from Samboan in 1832. Its Parish Church was finished in 1834.

Roman Catholic Parishes for these 3 municipalities in the Roman Catholic Archdiocese of Cebu are,

- San Nicolas De Tolentino Parish (F-1834), Malabuyoc, Cebu 6029
- San Gregorio Magno Parish (F-1847), Ginatilan, Cebu 6028
- Saint Francis Xavier Parish (F-1857), Alegria, Cebu 6030

== Geography ==
Malabuyoc is bordered by Alegria in the north, The Tañon Strait in the west, Boljoon in the east, and Ginatilan in the south. It is 139 kilometres (86 mi) from Cebu City.

Malabuyoc is one of the eight municipalities comprising the 7th congressional district of Cebu.

=== Barangays ===
Malabuyoc is politically subdivided into 14 barangays. Each barangay consists of puroks and some have sitios.

PSGC	Barangay	Population			±% p.a.	
		2024		2010		
072229001	Armeña (Cansilongan)	5.2%	1,056	950	▴	0.73%
072229015	Barangay I (Poblacion)	8.0%	1,630	1,773	▾	−0.58%
072229016	Barangay II (Poblacion)	6.2%	1,261	1,173	▴	0.50%
072229005	Cerdeña (Ansan)	10.1%	2,062	2,011	▴	0.17%
072229006	Labrador (Bulod)	3.3%	682	744	▾	−0.60%
072229008	Lombo	6.4%	1,313	1,327	▾	−0.07%
072229007	Lo-oc	6.4%	1,309	1,173	▴	0.76%
072229009	Mahanlud	3.4%	699	605	▴	1.00%
072229010	Mindanao (Pajo)	2.8%	571	533	▴	0.47%
072229011	Montañeza (Inamlang)	16.2%	3,306	3,212	▴	0.20%
072229012	Salmeron (Bulok)	4.3%	877	774	▴	0.86%
072229013	Santo Niño (Salering)	14.0%	2,846	2,721	▴	0.31%
072229014	Sorsogon (Balikmaya)	5.8%	1,174	1,159	▴	0.09%
072229004	Tolosa (Calatagan)	7.8%	1,592	1,615	▾	−0.10%
	Total		20,378	19,778	▴	0.21%

=== Climate ===
Köppen-Geiger climate classification system classifies Malabuyoc's climate as tropical rainforest.

Climate data for Malabuyoc, Cebu
Month	Jan	Feb	Mar	Apr	May	Jun	Jul	Aug	Sep	Oct	Nov	Dec	Year
Mean daily maximum °C (°F)	29 (84)	29 (84)	30 (86)	32 (90)	31 (88)	30 (86)	30 (86)	30 (86)	30 (86)	29 (84)	29 (84)	29 (84)	30 (86)
Mean daily minimum °C (°F)	23 (73)	23 (73)	23 (73)	24 (75)	25 (77)	25 (77)	24 (75)	24 (75)	24 (75)	24 (75)	24 (75)	23 (73)	24 (75)
Average precipitation mm (inches)	35 (1.4)	28 (1.1)	38 (1.5)	51 (2.0)	125 (4.9)	195 (7.7)	194 (7.6)	173 (6.8)	180 (7.1)	192 (7.6)	121 (4.8)	64 (2.5)	1,396 (55)
Average rainy days	9.2	8.2	9.9	11.3	22.5	27.3	28.0	27.2	27.1	26.9	19.7	12.7	230
Source: Meteoblue

== Demographics ==
Population census of Malabuyoc
Year	Pop.	±% p.a.
1903	11,781	—
1918	14,894	+1.58%
1939	13,855	−0.34%
1948	14,096	+0.19%
1960	11,883	−1.41%
1970	12,628	+0.61%
1975	13,993	+2.08%
1980	13,740	−0.36%
1990	14,628	+0.63%
1995	17,090	+2.96%
2000	17,015	−0.09%
2007	18,117	+0.87%
2010	18,426	+0.62%
2015	19,373	+0.96%
2020	19,770	+0.43%
2024	20,378	+0.73%
Source: Philippine Statistics Authority

== Economy ==
Poverty incidence of Malabuyoc (%)

Source: Philippine Statistics Authority

The main economy is agriculture in particular fruit-bearing trees. There is a cement plant located within, and a power station planned.

== Tourism ==
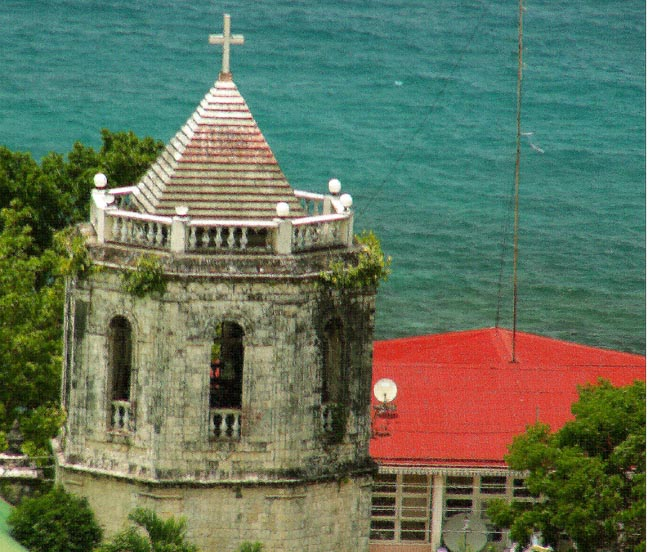
Bell tower of San Nicolas de Tolentino church

Binuyocan Festival

The municipality of Malabuyoc launched the Binuyocan Festival on 10 September 2004, in time for the annual town fiesta. Local contingents paraded the streets. Binuyocan Festival has been part of the fiesta celebration in honor of Saint Nicholas of Tolentino since then.

Tourist spots:

- Handigan Falls (Sorsogon)
- Kanspitan Caves (Sorsogon)
- Da-o Cliff (Sorsogon)
- Balugo Falls (Located at the boundaries of Salmeroz, Mahanlud, Mindanao & Sorsogon)
- Ilihan Hills
- Kabutongan Falls
- Kagula Cliff
- Montañeza Falls & Hot Spring
- Moro Watch Tower
- Old Roman Catholic Church
- Talangnan Marine Sanctuary

== Education ==
Tertiary schools:

- Cebu Technological University — Malabuyoc Extension

The public schools in the town of Malabuyoc are administered by one school district under the Schools Division of Cebu Province.

Elementary schools:

- Armeña Elementary School — Armeña
- Calipay Elementary School — Sitio Calipay, Mahanlud
- Cerdeña Elementary School — Cerdeña
- Labrador Elementary School — Labrador
- Lombo Elementary School — Lombo
- Mahanlud Elementary School — Mahanlud
- Malabuyoc Central Elementary School — Barangay II
- Mindanao Elementary School — Mindanao
- Montañeza Elementary School — Montañeza
- Palaypay Elementary School — Sitio Palaypay, Tolosa
- Salmeron Elementary School — Salmeron
- Santo Niño Elementary School — Santo Niño
- Sorsogon Elementary School — Sorsogon

High schools:

- Cerdeña National High School — Cerdeña
- Mahanlud National High School — Mahanlud
- Montañeza National High School — Montañeza
- Sorsogon National High School — Sorsogon

Integrated schools:

- Calatagan Integrated School — Tolosa
- Looc Integrated School — Looc

Private schools:

- Perpetual Succour Academy, Inc. — Barangay II
