= Duke Frasco =

Filipino politician (born 1980)

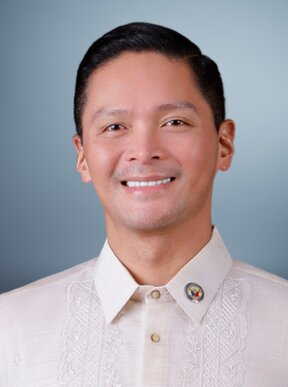
- Official portrait, 2025

Deputy Speaker of the House of Representatives of the Philippines
- Incumbent
- Assumed office March 18, 2026
- Speaker: Bojie Dy
- In office July 27, 2022 – June 30, 2025
- Speaker: Martin Romualdez

Member of the House of Representatives for Cebu's 5th District
- Incumbent
- Assumed office June 30, 2019
- Preceded by: Ramon Durano VI

Mayor of Liloan, Cebu
- In office June 30, 2007 – June 30, 2016
- Vice Mayor: Thelma Jordan (2007–2010); Merelito Surita (2010–2013); Lucelito Pilapil (2013–2016)
- Preceded by: Maria Sevilla
- Succeeded by: Christina Frasco

Vice Mayor of Liloan, Cebu
- In office June 30, 2016 – June 30, 2019
- Mayor: Christina Frasco
- Preceded by: Lucelito Pilapil
- Succeeded by: Thelma Jordan

Personal details
- Born: Vincent Franco Domingo Frasco; October 27, 1980 (age 45) Cebu City, Philippines
- Party: 1CEBU (2012–present)
- Other political affiliations: NUP (2021–2025); Lakas (2018–2021); UNA (2012–2016); Liberal (2010–2012); DILC (2009–2010); Independent (2007–2009)
- Spouse: Christina Codilla (m. 2009)
- Children: 4
- Education: Loyola Marymount University (BS)
- Occupation: Politician

Vincent Franco "Duke" Domingo Frasco (born October 27, 1980) is a Filipino politician. He is currently serving as representative for Cebu's 5th congressional district since 2019. He currently serves as the Deputy Speaker of the House of Representatives in the 20th Congress of the Philippines since 2026, a position he previously held in the 19th Congress from 2022 to 2025. He served as the mayor of Liloan from 2007 to 2016. He went to college in Los Angeles and worked with the consulting firm Protiviti. In the 2007 Philippine general election, he ran for Mayor of Liloan, winning by a majority. He served for three terms.

Before joining the House of Representatives of the Philippines (HoR), he was a member of the Cebu Port Authority. In the 2019 Philippine HoR elections, Frasco represented the fifth district of Cebu. He supported multiple projects. In the 2022 Philippine HoR elections, he was elected as the Deputy Speaker. In the 2025 Philippine HoR elections, he won. He failed in his bid to become House Speaker in 2025, which caused him to form an independent bloc.

== Early life and education ==
Frasco was born on October 27, 1980, in Liloan, Cebu to Former Liloan Mayor Panphil "Dodong Daku" B. Frasco. He attended college in the Loyola Marymount University in Los Angeles, California. From there, he got a degree in accounting and business. Before entering politics, he worked with Protiviti, a consulting firm.

== Early political career ==
=== Mayor of Liloan (2007–2016) ===
Frasco ran for Mayor of Liloan for the 2007 Philippine general elections, winning with a majority of 70 percent. He had a 95 percent approval rating during his first term as mayor. He ran again unopposed for the 2010 Philippine general election, gaining 80 percent of the total votes, becoming the youngest mayor in Cebu. He was the chairman of multiple municipal projects. During his term, he changed the locally generated income of Liloan to 400 percent.

=== Positions ===
He was the chairman of the Municipal School Board, the Municipal Development Council, and the Municipal Health Board of Liloan. Frasco was also the Vice President for Internal Affairs of the League of Municipalities of the Philippines and Cebu Chapter. He is the Director and Co-owner of the Titay's Liloan Rosquillos and Delicacies, Inc, a bakery in Cebu. He was also a member of the Cebu Port Authority, appointed by former President Rodrigo Duterte. He took his oath on January 9, 2017.

== House of Representatives (2019–present) ==
=== First term ===
Frasco ran for the Congressman for Cebu's 5th congressional district, with the National Unity Party and the local One Cebu. He won against former congressman Red Durano in 2019 elections with 152,435 votes against Durano's 116,826. During his term, he was elected as the chairman of Visayas Development, a House of Representatives committee in August 2019. Frasco filed his first bill on July 29, 2019, separating two high schools in Liloan. In 2020, he helped 76 lot owners in the Camotes Islands officially gain their plots after government confusion.

=== Second term ===
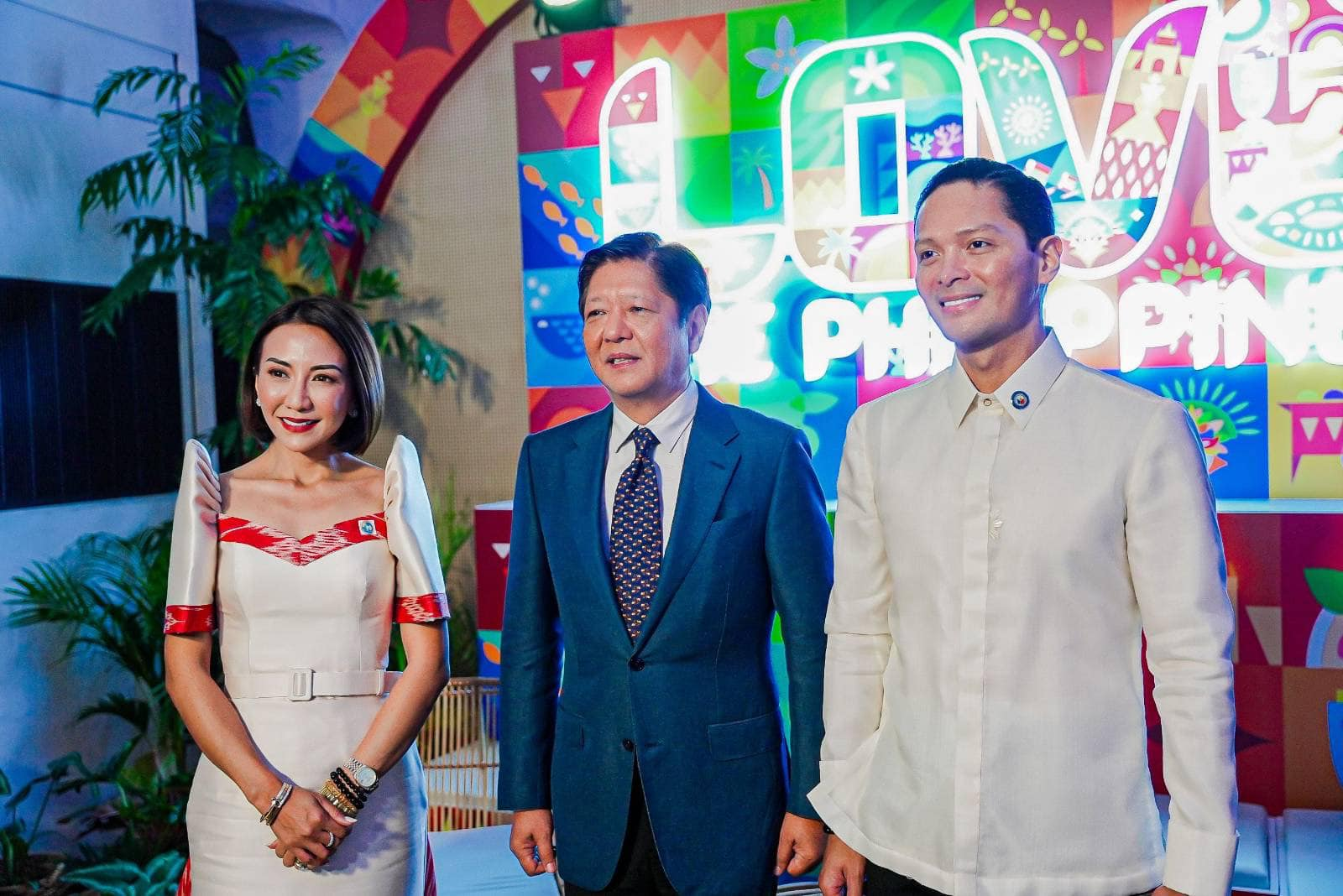
Duke Frasco (right) and Christina Frasco (left) with President Bongbong Marcos (center) in June 2023

In the 2022 Philippine House of Representatives elections, Frasco gained 222,288 votes against Durano's 108,596 votes. He was eventually elected as one of the deputy speakers of the 19th Congress of the Philippines. He sponsored House Bill 6900, which gave residents the power to own land in the Camotes Islands. He gave 23 million PHP to eight hospitals in Cebu.

The Duke Frasco Cup, a basketball event, was started on May 18, 2023. More than 100 athletes from different municipalities joined. Multiple events were organized, including a tournament. The event was described as a mini version of the province's "Guv Cup", but for the 5th district of Cebu. On October 30, 2023, Frasco and his wife was charged of “illegally and unjustifiably delivered vehicles as ambulances to Barangays Looc and Poblacion” on February 14, 2022, by Danao Barangay Captains Don Roel Arias (Looc) and Joselito Cane (Poblacion), but the complaints were cleared by The Office of the Ombudsman. In a 2024 trademark infringement case, the Court of Appeals reversed the Intellectual Property Office of the Philippines's decision and ruled that Frasco cannot use “Frasco” as trade name on his company's bottled water and containers since it resulted in patent infringement of the registered trademark Frasco used by Ginebra San Miguel (GSMI) on its gin label.

=== Third and current term ===
In the 2025 Philippine House of Representatives elections, Frasco ran under the National Unity Party. He won with 217,303 votes, 6.38 percent of the votes, beating his opponent Mix Durano by 100,000 votes. He was expelled from the NUP party after refusing to support Speaker Martin Romualdez. In his membership in the 20th Congress of the Philippines, He failed in his bid to become House Speaker in 2025, which caused him to form an independent bloc.

== Personal life ==
Frasco is married to Christina Frasco, who had served as Tourism Secretary and Mayor of Liloan, Cebu. The couple has four children. He married her on August 8, 2009, with President Gloria Macapagal Arroyo as a wedding sponsor.

== Electoral history ==
Electoral history of Duke Frasco
Year	Office	Party		Votes received				Result
Year	Office	Local	National	Total	%	P.	Swing	Result
2007	Mayor of Liloan	—N/a	IND	24,850	—N/a	1st	—N/a	Won
2010	Mayor of Liloan	DILC	Liberal	31,720	100.00%	1st	—N/a	Unopposed
2013	Mayor of Liloan	1CEBU	UNA	28,727	68.29%	1st	—N/a	Won
2016	Vice Mayor of Liloan	1CEBU	UNA	37,803	—N/a	1st	—N/a	Won
2019	Representative (Cebu–5th)	1CEBU	Lakas	152,435	56.61%	1st	—N/a	Won
2022	Representative (Cebu–5th)	1CEBU	NUP	222,288	67.18%	1st	—N/a	Won
2025	Representative (Cebu–5th)	1CEBU	NUP	217,303	62.01%	1st	—N/a	Won
