= Ginatilan =

Municipality in Cebu, Philippines

- Municipality
- Municipality of Ginatilan
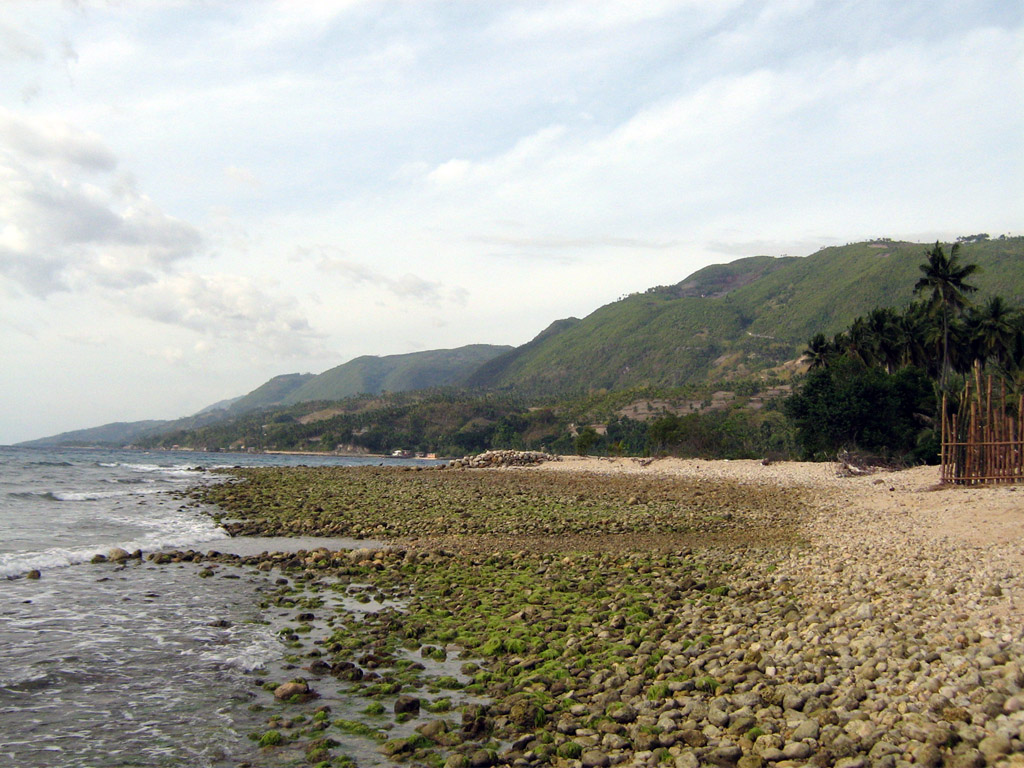
- Coastal view
- Interactive map of Ginatilan
- Location within the Philippines
- Coordinates: 9°36′N 123°21′E
- Country: Philippines
- Region: Central Visayas
- Province: Cebu
- District: 7th district
- Founded: 1847
- Barangays: 14 (see Barangays)

Government
  - Type: Sangguniang Bayan
  - Mayor: Roy Vincent P. Singco
  - Vice Mayor: Dean Michael P. Singco
  - Representative: Peter John D. Calderon
  - Municipal Council: Members: Jose Ramon O. Gornez; Abigail Tolabing-Miller; Ma. Riza A. Barriga; Wilfie John T. Singco; Kirby Cesar D. Ibo; Rodrigo D. Gusarin; Jan Walter F. Tocao; Calvin C. Belocura
  - Electorate: 12,604 voters (2025)

Area
  - Total: 70.10 km^{2} (27.07 sq mi)
- Elevation: 174 m (571 ft)
- Highest elevation: 766 m (2,513 ft)
- Lowest elevation: 0 m (0 ft)

Population (2024 census)
  - Total: 17,184
  - Density: 245.1/km^{2} (634.9/sq mi)
  - Households: 3,974

Economy
  - Income class: 4th municipal income class
  - Poverty incidence: 25.37% (2023)
  - Revenue: ₱ 119.8 million (2024)
  - Assets: ₱ 394.9 million (2024)
  - Expenditure: ₱ 80.51 million (2024)
  - Liabilities: ₱ 80.79 million (2024)

Service provider
  - Electricity: Cebu 1 Electric Cooperative (CEBECO 1)
- Time zone: UTC+8 (PST)
- ZIP code: 6026
- PSGC: 072225000
- IDD : area code: +63 (0)32
- Native languages: Cebuano; Tagalog

Ginatilan, officially the Municipality of Ginatilan (Cebuano: Lungsod sa Ginatilan; Tagalog: Bayan ng Ginatilan), is a municipality in the province of Cebu, Philippines. According to the 2024 census, it has a population of 17,184 people.

== Geography ==
Ginatilan is bordered to the north by the town of Malabuyoc, to the west is the Tañon Strait, to the east is the town of Oslob, and to the south is the town of Samboan. It is 148 kilometres (92 mi) from Cebu City and 4 kilometres (2.5 mi) from Samboan.

Ginatilan is one of the eight municipalities comprising the 7th Congressional District Cebu Province.

=== Barangays ===
Ginatilan is politically subdivided into 14 barangays. Each barangay consists of puroks and some have sitios.

PSGC	Barangay	Population			±% p.a.	
		2024		2010		
072225001	Anao	3.6%	616	534	▴	1.00%
072225002	Cagsing	6.8%	1,171	1,162	▴	0.05%
072225003	Calabawan	3.8%	654	538	▴	1.37%
072225004	Cambagte	2.7%	472	577	▾	−1.39%
072225005	Campisong	2.7%	457	459	▾	−0.03%
072225006	Cañorong	4.6%	792	819	▾	−0.23%
072225007	Guiwanon	7.0%	1,205	968	▴	1.53%
072225008	Looc	6.8%	1,172	1,050	▴	0.77%
072225009	Malatbo	5.7%	986	815	▴	1.33%
072225010	Mangaco	8.1%	1,390	1,218	▴	0.92%
072225011	Palanas	14.5%	2,490	1,970	▴	1.64%
072225012	Poblacion	18.7%	3,219	3,045	▴	0.39%
072225013	Salamanca	4.2%	719	640	▴	0.81%
072225014	San Roque	9.1%	1,563	1,532	▴	0.14%
	Total		17,184	15,327	▴	0.80%

=== Climate ===
Climate data for Ginatilan, Cebu
Month	Jan	Feb	Mar	Apr	May	Jun	Jul	Aug	Sep	Oct	Nov	Dec	Year
Mean daily maximum °C (°F)	29 (84)	29 (84)	30 (86)	32 (90)	31 (88)	30 (86)	30 (86)	30 (86)	30 (86)	29 (84)	29 (84)	29 (84)	30 (86)
Mean daily minimum °C (°F)	23 (73)	23 (73)	23 (73)	24 (75)	25 (77)	25 (77)	24 (75)	24 (75)	24 (75)	24 (75)	24 (75)	23 (73)	24 (75)
Average precipitation mm (inches)	35 (1.4)	28 (1.1)	38 (1.5)	51 (2.0)	125 (4.9)	195 (7.7)	194 (7.6)	173 (6.8)	180 (7.1)	192 (7.6)	121 (4.8)	64 (2.5)	1,396 (55)
Average rainy days	9.2	8.2	9.9	11.3	22.5	27.3	28.0	27.2	27.1	26.9	19.7	12.7	230
Source: Meteoblue

== Demographics ==
Population census of Ginatilan
Year	Pop.	±% p.a.
1903	10,617	—
1918	11,989	+0.81%
1939	8,690	−1.52%
1948	8,390	−0.39%
1960	8,150	−0.24%
1970	9,036	+1.04%
1975	10,055	+2.17%
1980	10,566	+1.00%
1990	11,160	+0.55%
1995	11,924	+1.25%
2000	14,073	+3.62%
2007	13,654	−0.42%
2010	15,327	+4.30%
2015	15,919	+0.72%
2020	16,906	+1.27%
2024	17,184	+0.39%
Source: Philippine Statistics Authority

== Economy ==
Poverty incidence of Ginatilan (%)

Source: Philippine Statistics Authority

== Attractions ==
Inambakan Falls is the municipality's most visited natural attraction. Hidden in a river valley in the middle of Ginatilan's highlands, the towering 100-foot (30 m) waterfall can be reached via motorcycles for hire.

Mount Hambubuyog straddles the border of Ginatilan and Samboan. The summit offers views of Tañon Strait and Negros Island.

Local delicacies include palagsing, tinumpi, and kinugay, made from buli tree.

Every March is annual festival in honor of the patron St. Gregory the Great.

Livelihood includes farming, fishing, government, and business.

Ginatilan is the hometown of Catholic martyr and second Filipino saint, St. Pedro Calungsod, who was killed during his missionary work in Guam with Diego Luis de San Vitores in 1672.

== Education ==
The public schools in the town of Ginatilan are administered by one school district under the Schools Division of Cebu Province.

Elementary schools:

- Anao Elementary School — Anao
- Cambagte Elementary School — Cambagte
- Campisong Elementary School — Campisong
- Canorong Elementary School — Cañorong
- Guiwanon Elementary School — Looc
- Kabatuan Elementary School — Caseres Road, Poblacion
- Kagsing Elementary School — Cagsing
- Salamanca Elementary School — Salamanca

High schools:

- Guiwanon National High School — Guiwanon
- Salamanca National High School — Salamanca

Integrated schools:

- Ginatilan Integrated School (formerly Ginatilan CES) — San Roque
- Mangaco Integrated School — Mangaco
- Palanas Integrated School — Palanas

Private schools:

- Holy Trinity School of Ginatilan, Inc. — San Roque
