= Southeast Asian coral reefs =

Marine ecosystem

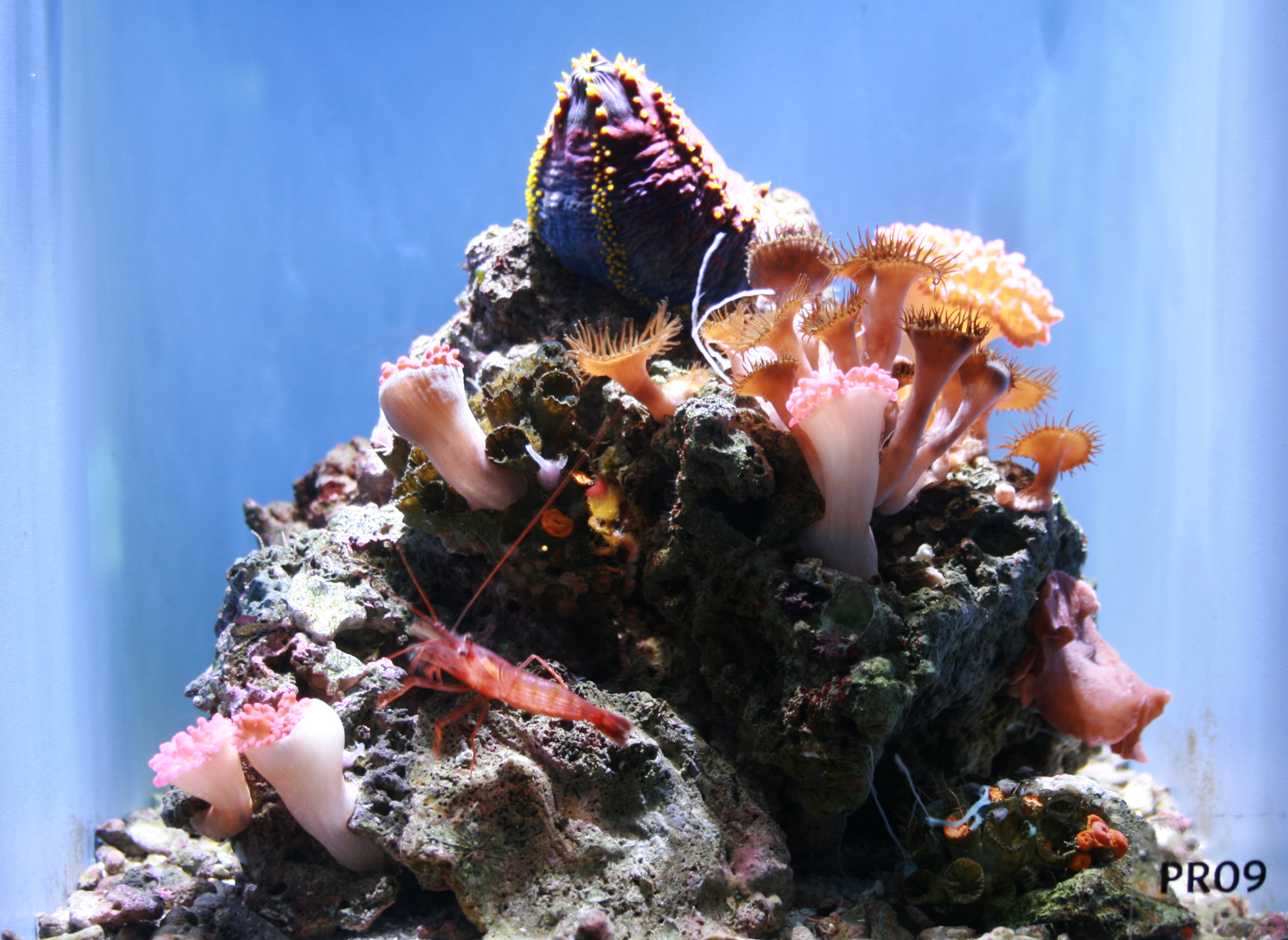
A display of Philippine reef organisms at the California Academy of Sciences.

Southeast Asian coral reefs have the highest levels of biodiversity for the world's marine ecosystems. They serve many functions, such as forming the livelihood for subsistence fishermen and even function as jewelry and construction materials. Corals inhabit coastal waters off of every continent except Antarctica, with an abundance of reefs residing along Southeast Asian coastline in several countries including Indonesia, the Philippines, and Thailand. Coral reefs are developed by the carbonate-based skeletons of a variety of animals and algae. Slowly and over time, the reefs build up to the surface in oceans. Coral reefs are found in shallow, warm salt water. The sunlight filters through clear water and allows microscopic organisms to live and reproduce. Coral reefs are actually composed of tiny, fragile animals known as coral polyps. Coral reefs are significantly important because of the biodiversity. Although the number of fish are decreasing, the remaining coral reefs contain more unique sea creatures. The variety of species living on a coral reef is greater than anywhere else in the world. An estimation of 70-90% of fish caught are dependent on coral reefs in Southeast Asia and reefs support over 25% of all known marine species.

However, despite their importance, Southeast Asian coral reefs are under severe threat from various factors, including overfishing, sedimentation, pollution, bleaching, ocean acidification, and human impacts. Bleaching events, triggered by rising sea temperatures, cause corals to expel the algae living in their tissues, leading to their whitening and eventual death. Ocean acidification, resulting from increased carbon dioxide absorption, poses another threat, weakening coral skeletons and hindering their growth. Human activities, such as coastal development and tourism, further exacerbate the degradation of coral reefs, disrupting fragile ecosystems and causing irreparable damage. Therefore, urgent conservation efforts are necessary to safeguard the future of Southeast Asian coral reefs and the countless marine species that depend on them.

== Indonesia ==
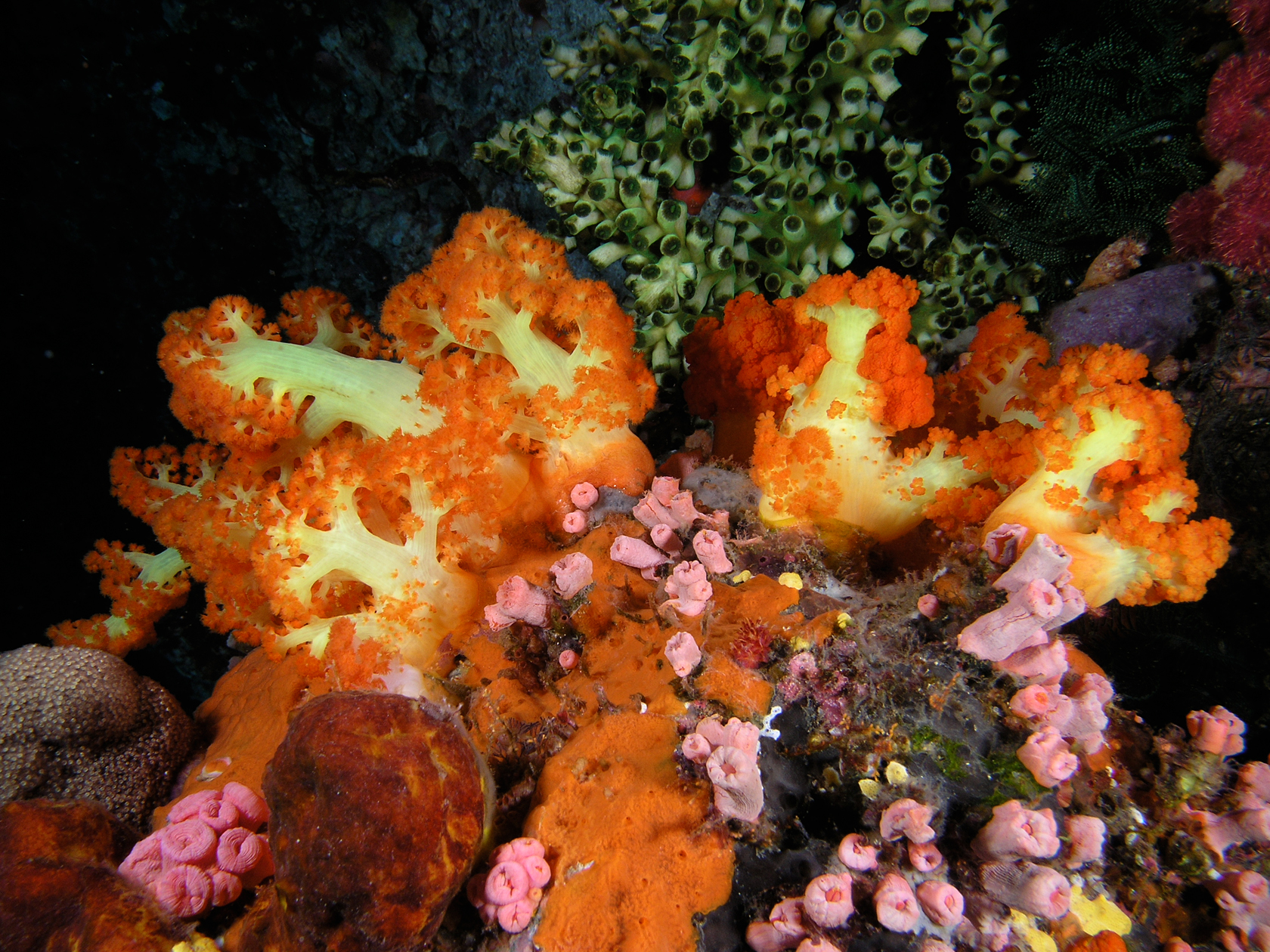
Soft corals Komodo National Park

Indonesia has 2,915,000 square kilometers of marine area. The reef area is 51,020 square kilometers. Of that amount, 82% of it is at risk. Indonesia holds 17% of the world's total coral reef areas. Blast fishing, which has been illegal since 1985 still goes on today, along with cyanide fishing (1995). Another factor that is hurting the coral reefs in Indonesia is the amount of coral that they export. They are the world's largest exporter of corals, exporting about 500 tons of coral per year.

COREMAP is helping Indonesia with their combat against destruction of corals by working in 9 of the 32 provinces. They want to:

1. Heighten law enforcement to protect coral reefs;
2. Establish coral reef monitoring and information systems, in order to conduct research on the status of coral reefs and more effectively disseminate that information to stakeholder groups;
3. Develop community-based management systems and increase public participation in coral reef resource management;
4. Increase institutional capacity and strengthen inter-institutional coordination in planning and implementing policy that affects coral reef management, and;
5. Enhance public knowledge of the importance of coral reef and motivate people to actively participate in the management and sustainable use of coral reefs.

== Philippines ==
The Philippines, with more than 7,000 islands and warm ocean waters, surround about 26,000 square kilometers of coral reef. These coral reefs have recently brought the attention of beneficial economic uses to the Philippines government.

Benefits of Coral Reefs in Philippines

1. Coral reefs break the waves from the chance of eroding the coastline of the islands;
2. Protection of Communities: "the reefs act as buffer zones" meaning they decrease the power of typhoons and hurricanes as they approach the Philippine Islands;
3. Economic Benefits: Fishing off the coral reefs, profits from tourism, for example, Diving tours and snorkeling areas on the shallow reefs. These economic benefits create many new jobs and profitable opportunities to the country.

== Thailand ==
Thailand's coastline and 300 small islands are home to 153 square kilometers of coral. Large bleaching events in 1998 and 2010 resulted in the massive loss of corals in the Gulf of Thailand, but some corals showed resilience to the events and displayed a lower mortality. Bleaching events such as these are just one of many threats that face corals in Thailand. Expansion of coastal tourism in Thailand has resulted in both a rise of coral damage and increased economic incentive to preserve and rebuild coral reefs. Tourist activities, such as diving, have become so popular in locations like the Similan Islands and Phi Phi Islands that they threaten to overwhelm and destroy protected marine areas unless new measures are taken to limit visitors and revitalize coral conservation efforts.

Recognition of both the economic and ecological value of Thailand's coral reefs and their rapid degradation due to tourism has led to consideration of new ways to protect reefs. For instance, Thailand has attempted to limit the number of tourists that can visit certain islands in a year or has implemented fees that would go towards counteracting the environmental damage on corals caused by tourism. Efforts in Thailand to rebuild reefs is part of a larger economic movement that attempts to preserve natural beauty in order to continue a lucrative tourism industry, a significant source of revenue for Thai islands. Coral restoration efforts, like the New Heaven Reef Conservation Program on the Koh Tao in the Gulf of Thailand, often incorporate the local community creating positive social change as well as ecological change. While these efforts seek to address some local concerns, technical limitations are a barrier that prevent further coral restoration, and the continuation of worldwide trends like ocean warming and acidification will have further negative impacts on Thailand's coral reefs.

== State ==
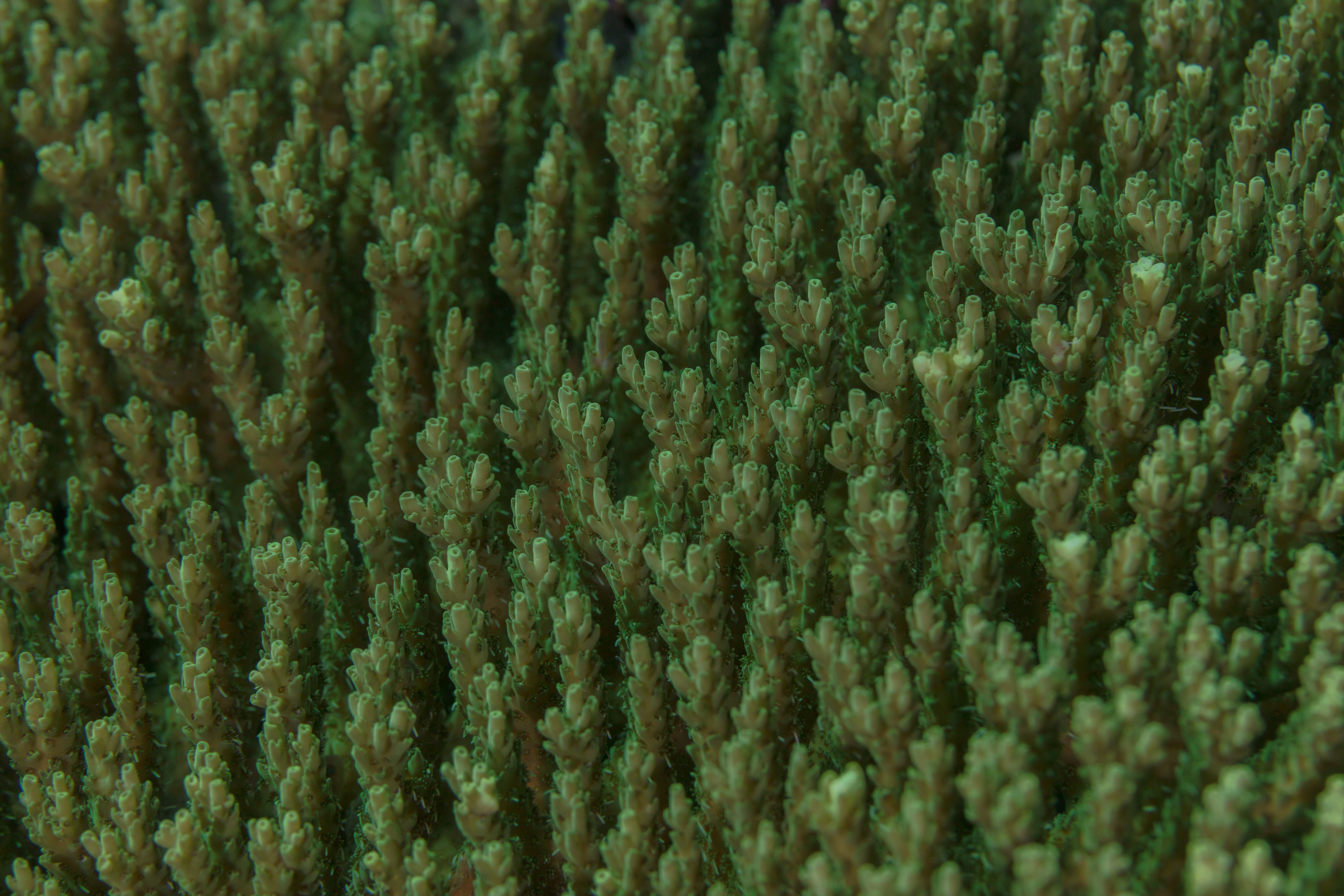
Acropora tenuis in Anilao, Iloilo

For the past 55 years, the proportion of degraded reefs in Indonesia increased from 10 to 50%. From 1989 to 2000 reefs with over 50% live coral cover declined from 36 to 29%. Western Indonesia, which is more developed and holds the majority of the nation's population, faces the greatest threats to its coral reefs. Surveys concluded that reef condition improves from west to east. The percentage of reefs in good or excellent condition (live coral cover of 50% or more) is 23% in western Indonesia versus 45% in eastern Indonesia. 65% of surveys taken from the Maluku islands had evidence of bomb damage. In addition, reefs affected by land-based pollution (i.e. sediment discharge into reefs by deforestation, industry, sewage, and fertilizer) show 30–50% less diversity at depths of three meters and 40–60% less diversity at 10 meters in comparison to pristine reefs. The 1997–1998 el Nino event triggered widespread bleaching in Indonesia, with western and west-central Indonesia most affected. Bleaching was recorded in East Sumatra, Java, Bali, and Lombok. In the Seribu Islands northwest of Jakarta, 90–95% of coral reef from the reef flat down to 25 meters died. Two years later, the Seribu Islands significantly recovered, with live coral cover of 20–30% (2000). Coral reefs in Indonesia are located near Java (Batavia), Nusa Dua, Jakarta and Saribu.

30% of the Philippine's coral reefs are dead while 39% are dying. The news isn't all bad: Establishment of the Sumilon Island marine reserve has resulted in a marked comeback of fish in adjacent areas. Along with the establishment of the Sumilon Island marine reserve, there is hope for the Philippines via boosts in ecotourism. In recent years, local Filipino governments have discovered that fishing is not the only economic benefit the reefs can provide. They are confident that with a spread of ecotourism, even local fishermen will reap the financial benefits of this economic sector. A surge in coral reef conservation education is helping the tourism sector provide information to tourists on how to preserve the coral reefs while they enjoy the beauty and serenity of the reefs. The Philippines ecotourism sector is unfortunately stifled at this time due to a limited budget and there are approximately 7,000 islands to patrol for destructive fishing techniques. Destructive fishing techniques are thought to be the largest contributor to reef degradation in the Philippines.

The first ever mass-bleaching event in the Philippines was reported in 1998–99. It began at Batangas, off Luzon, in June 1998 and then proceeded nearly clockwise around the Philippines, correlating with anomalous sea-surface temperatures. Most reefs of northern Luzon, west Palawan, the Visayas, and parts of Mindanao were affected. Subsequent mortalities were highly variable, with decreases in live coral cover ranging from 0.7 to 46 percent and up to 80 percent in Bolinao. Recent surveys in 1997 found a low percentage of reefs to be in excellent condition. They found only 4 percent of Philippine reefs in excellent condition (i.e., over 75 percent hard or soft coral cover), 28 percent in good condition (50-75 percent coral cover), 42 percent in fair condition (25-50 percent coral cover), and 27 percent in poor condition (less than 25 percent coral cover). The Visayas have experienced the most significant decline in coral cover, exhibiting an average of only 11 percent hard coral cover.

A study in the early 1990s revealed that coral reefs are damaged by a variety of human activities such as household sewage, industrial waste, and agricultural chemicals from land that are washed to the sea. This was a new finding for the time period in which it was widely believed that the main damage to coral reefs was caused by oil spills or from pollution dumped by ships. This survey was concentrated on SE Asia mainly because it was believed that coral reefs in this region were at great threat of extinction if continued to be unmanaged. In the last thirty years climate change has had the most harmful effect on corals. (Hughes) Currently one of the major issues the Indonesian government is dealing with is climate change. (CIA Worldfactbook) When the ocean warms such as in El Nino, coral bleaching occurs, which kills the coral. (Hughes) The reefs are incredibly important to the economy and people of Southeast Asia. The reefs bring in $1.6 billion a year through fishing, employment, and the tourist industry. (Reefs at Risk in Southeast Asia Key Findings 2002) Today, the coral reefs located in the Philippines and Indonesia are in great danger. Fishermen are constantly practising dangerous methods such as blast fishing and dynamite fishing. These practices prove to be detrimental to the coral reefs as well as the marine life in the surrounding areas. Because of the dangerous methods, fish that are usually near the coral reefs are no longer there any more. Two of these fish are Groupers and snappers. According to David Nockels it was only seven years ago that 30% of the reefs were dead in this region and many more were dying.

== Climate change ==
The agriculture sector experiences notable repercussions as longer dry periods attributed to El Niño result in substantial harm to crops and farm yields. Furthermore, projections indicate a concerning trend for water resources, with estimates suggesting an increase in the proportion of municipalities facing water scarcity. It is anticipated that by 2025, this ratio will elevate from the current 14% to 19%, with a further rise to 31% by 2050, particularly under the SRES B1 scenario. Additionally, coastal regions and marine ecosystems face significant threats, including coral bleaching due to El Niño events and the erosion of coastlines prompted by rising sea levels and intensified wave activity. These multifaceted impacts underscore the urgent need for proactive measures to mitigate the effects of climate variability and safeguard vulnerable communities and ecosystems.

== Depletion ==
For 50 percent of Southeast Asia's coral reefs, they are at high or very high levels of threat. Only 12 percent of the reefs are at low risk. 64 percent of the regions reefs are threatened by overfishing and 56 percent are threatened by destructive fishing techniques. Indonesia and the Philippines together possess about 77 percent of the region's coral reefs and nearly all of those reefs are threatened. Over 90 percent of the coral reefs in Cambodia, Singapore, Taiwan, the Philippines, Vietnam, China, and the Spratly Islands are threatened and over 85 percent of reefs of Malaysia and Indonesia are threatened. Heavy reliance on marine resources resulted in overexploitation and degradation of many coral reefs, especially those near major population centers. Major threats include overfishing, destructive fishing practices, sedimentation and pollution from land based sources. Human activities threaten an estimated 88 percent of Southeast Asia's coral reefs, jeopardizing the biological and economic value to society. Coral reefs just off the coasts of Indonesia and the Philippines possess the world's most diverse coral species and organisms. These coral reefs are susceptible to severe damage by environmental impacts and mankind. The majority of the destruction of coral reefs in Southeast Asia is due to illegal fishing practices and explosives. These explosives kill fish and shatter the coral skeletons resulting in depletion. Scientists agree that pollution, overfishing, cyanide fishing, and bleaching have negatively impacted about 85% of Indonesia's reefs. In recent years, the direct and indirect effects of overfishing and pollution from agriculture and land development have been the major drivers of massive and accelerating decreases in abundance of coral reef species, causing widespread changes in reef ecosystems. Philippines is covered with 35,000 km^{2} coral reefs. But 70% of them are degraded. The conditions of coral reefs are deteriorating on a dramatic rate. Global climate change has caused serious troubles on coral reefs. Changes in ocean chemistry due to increasing carbon dioxide level cause weakening of coral skeletons and reduce the accretion of reefs, especially at higher latitudes. Hurricanes, rising sea levels and Greenhouse are also great threats. However, the most pressing impact of climate change is coral bleaching and disease that have already increased over the past 30 years. Other than climate change, trawling, dynamite fishing, and diving tourism also have large influence on the health of coral reefs.

Blast fishing, also called dynamite fishing, is a major contributor to the destruction of coral reefs. Even though blast fishing was banned in 1985, it still remains a huge threat to the Indonesia coral reefs. By filling up an empty bottle with fertiliser and kerosene a fisherman can create an improvised but powerful explosive and throw it into the ocean gaining immediate access to hundreds of dead fish. This method of fishing leaves coral reefs virtually unsalvagable, yet has become increasingly popular as the demand for fish increases but the supply steadily decreases. The explosives used to catch dead fish destroys coral reefs from the inside leaving them no room for regrowth. This effect in turn hurts Filipino fisherman because it leaves no place for fish to reproduce and thus decreases the fish population. Blast fishing became popular among Filipino fisherman in the mid-1980s, but did not gain global attention until the 1990s. Laws created to prevent blast fishing are poorly enforced by officials of this area, and fisherman are highly motivated to continue this practice for survival and profit. "These are not poor Third World guys trying to put food on the table, go to the villages and find the people who head the dynamite fishing cooperatives are the people with new Jeeps and new satellite dishes in their houses. This is about greed,". Indonesia and the Philippines contain about 77% of the regions coral reef systems, and with 98% of the Philippine coral reefs seriously threatened by human activities, it is obvious that there needs to be serious changes to the marine practices of the communities.

Cyanide fishing originated in the Philippines in the 1960s due to the growing market for aquarium fish in North America and Europe. This method of fishing is done by squirting cyanide, a poison, directly into crevices of the coral reefs. The cyanide quickly stuns the fish, making the fishermen's job much easier when catching their targeted prey. This poison is extremely harmful to the surrounding corals and all of the reef's inhabitants. Since the 1960s when this practice began, over one million kilograms of cyanide poison has been released and used to catch fish amongst the Philippine coral reefs. However, less than one half of the live fish caught by this method survive to be sold to restaurants and aquariums.

Another major problem facing the Southeast Asian Coral Reefs is sedimentation. Sedimentation is caused by development on land and agricultural runoff. Southeast Asian countries are experiencing rapid development, leading to deforestation, and construction projects near the reefs that lead to sediment eroding and covering the corals. This reduces sunlight, and smothers the coral colonies; clogging their mouths, which killing them. The nutrient rich sediment also facilitates algae growth, which can overgrow the corals. Sedimentation will continue to be a major problem as Southeast Asian economies continue to grow.

The Philippine waters are considered as having nearly 70% of its coral reefs destroyed with only 5% in good condition. Although this dynamite and cyanide fishing may be targeted at one specific location, it destroys the surrounding habitat as well, spreading over one kilometer upon each impact. It takes over one hundred years for these reefs to grow into substantial sizes, at a rate of one inch every five years. These poor fishing practices not only threaten the food habitats for many species, but also the biodiversity that makes these Philippine and Indonesian coasts so beautiful. Inland human activities is what mainly pressures these reefs' pristine states; from indirect activities such as the increasing demand within the fishing industry as well as directly, through coastal run-off and pollution.

The coral reefs of Indonesia and the Philippines are vital to food security, employment, tourism, and medicinal research. The value of the regions sustainable coral reef fisheries alone is US$2.4 billion a year. These countries rely on the marine resources as a means to diversify their economy. Due to unsafe fishing practices, the coral reefs in these countries are experiencing a decline. There are no pristine coral reefs left in the world. Coral reefs in these countries are headed toward becoming ecologically extinct. Without the abundance of Marine resources, the Philippines and Indonesia will experience a major hit to their economy.

On September 24, 2007, Reef Check (the world's largest reef conservation organization) stated that only 5% of Philippines' 27,000 square-kilometers of coral reef are in "excellent condition" : Tubbataha Reef, Marine Park in Palawan, Apo Island in Negros Oriental, Apo Reef in Puerto Galera, Mindoro, and Verde Island Passage off Batangas. Philippine coral reefs is 2nd largest in Asia.

== Bleaching ==
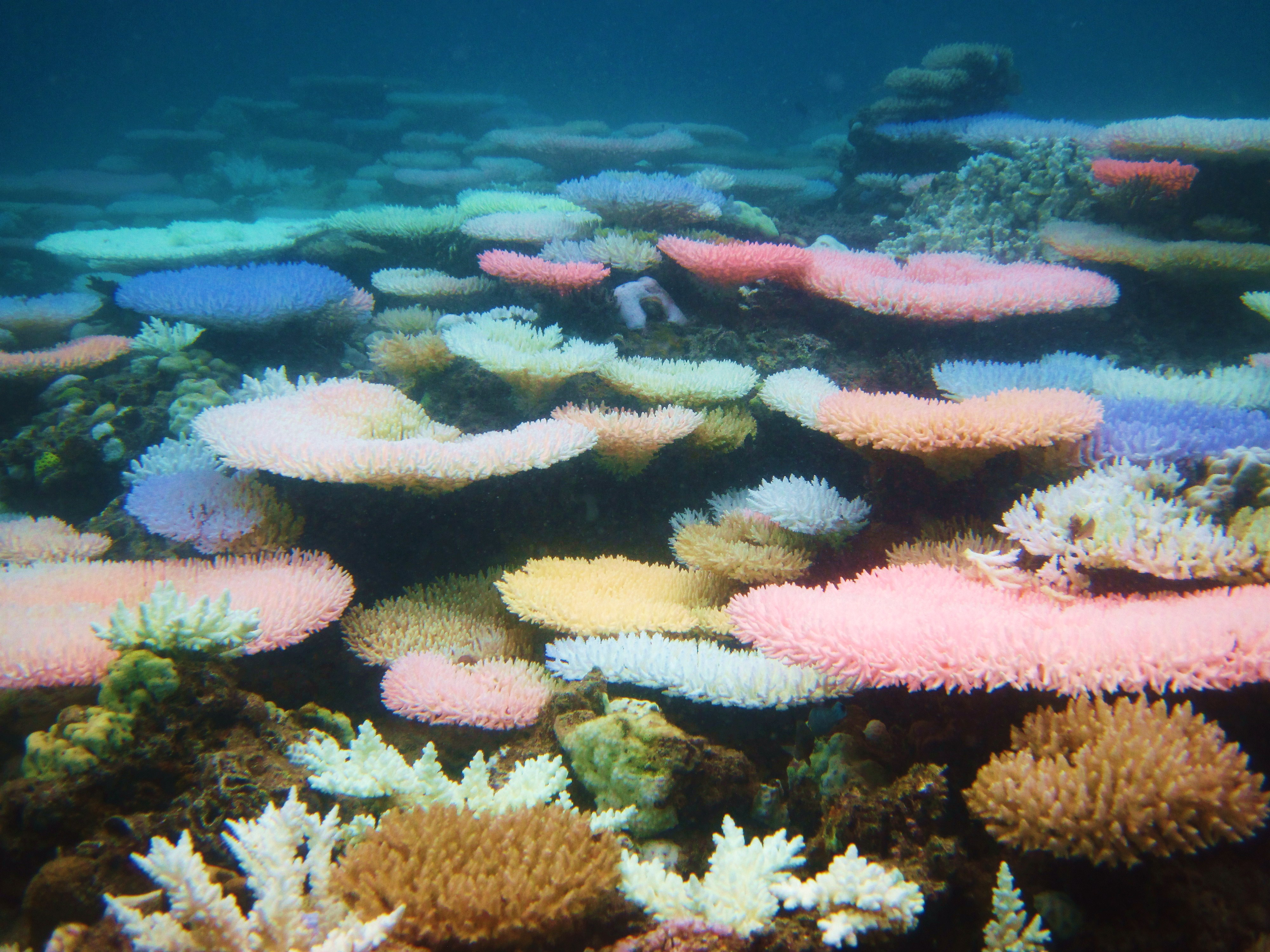
Coral bleaching in the Philippines.

Bleaching is one significant threat to the corals. Bleaching is a process that expels the photosynthetic algae from the corals' "stomachs" or polyps. This algae is called zooxanthellae. It is vital to the reef's life because it provides the coral with nutrients; it is also responsible for the color. The process is called bleaching because when the algae is ejected from the coral reef the animal loses its pigment. Zooxanthellae densities are continually changing; bleaching is really an extreme of what naturally happens. The detrimental exaggeration of the natural occurrence can be explained by the increasing temperature of the oceans which is accused to be a result of the "Greenhouse Effect," or global warming (Blackman and Hughes). Biological oceanographer Paul Falkowski and marine biologist Andrew Baker from the Wildlife Conservation Society study bleaching and why it occurs. Their explanations can be put in their simplest terms as such: the algae's membrane melts from the rise in temperature and, as a result, spits out an "oxygen species" directly into the reef. The animal, in turn, views this process as a threat and ejects the algae as a defense mechanism. Once the zooxanthellae are expelled the coral have nothing to feed off and die. Bleaching has been shown to cause up to 90% mortality rate of the affected corals. However, there is a catch. The reefs that are victims of bleaching have been found to be affected in patches, suggesting that there are several factors that affect the bleaching threshold. Not only that, but both bleached and non-bleached corals are often found right next to each other. These cases are numerous, and the variation and impact of factors (such as species or light) are still being heavily questioned, researched, and are vaguely understood.

== Ocean acidification ==
One of the largest potential threats of ocean acidification to marine invertebrates is the corrosive properties of undersaturated waters with respect to calcium carbonate skeletons/shells, and a theoretical inability to calcify under these conditions. Ocean acidification is a lowered pH of ocean waters caused by increased carbon dioxide emissions into the atmosphere, which results in more CO_{2} dissolving into the ocean. This poses a threat to corals and calcifying macroalgae, two main calcifying groups that occur in reefs, as well as other shelled organisms and the organisms that depend on them. Corals and calcifying macroalgae such as coralline red algae and calcifying green algae are extremely sensitive to ocean acidification because they build their hard structures out of calcium carbonate. The sinking pH of ocean waters makes it difficult for these shelled creatures to produce enough calcium carbonate to build and maintain their skeletal structures. Echinoderms, such as sea stars and sea urchins, and mollusks, including squid and clams, as well as many other species are also at risk because of thinning shells and weakened skeletal structures. By targeting calcifying organisms, ocean acidification threatens the health of reef ecosystems as a whole.

Ocean acidification from increasing level of atmospheric CO_{2} represents a major global threat to coral reefs, and in many regions acidification is exacerbated by local smaller-scale disturbances such as overfishing. Studies have shown that severe acidification and warming alone can lower reef resilience even under high grazing intensity and low nutrients. Furthermore, the threshold at which herbivore overfishing (reduced grazing) leads to a coral-algal phase shift was lowered by acidification and warming. Also, increasing temperature and ocean acidification are predicted to have a synergistic effect; ocean warming will further magnify ocean acidification changes.

== Sedimentation ==
Sedimentation is a threat to coral reefs because it can smother and suffocate coral polyps, preventing them from receiving sunlight and nutrients essential for their survival. When sediment settles on coral reefs, it can block the sunlight needed for photosynthesis by symbiotic algae living within the coral tissues. This can lead to a decline in the algae population, causing coral bleaching and ultimately death of the coral colonies. Additionally, sedimentation can physically damage corals by abrading their surfaces or burying them under layers of sediment, making it difficult for new coral larvae to settle and grow.

Human activities such as deforestation, construction, agriculture, and coastal development can increase sedimentation by accelerating erosion and runoff of sediment into coastal waters. Poor land management practices, such as clear-cutting forests or improper soil conservation measures, can exacerbate sedimentation and its impacts on coral reefs. Therefore, sedimentation is a significant threat to coral reef ecosystems, contributing to their degradation and loss of biodiversity.

== Social impacts of depletion ==
Most Southeastern Asian coastal communities are socially and economically dependent upon coral reef ecosystems. 350 million people live within 50k of the coast and the majority of that population depend in one way or another upon the coral reefs. Because so many people are dependent on such a precious ecosystem, environmental impacts are not all they are facing. Along with the degradation and depletion of the physical coral and its inhabitants, the Southeastern Asian residents are facing major social and economic implications. Socially, the coral depletion could have a devastating effect on the population and the culture that is dependent upon the reefs of Southeast Asia.

The marine waters of the Philippines is five times more in area than the land it covers. Out of the 86 million people that reside in the Philippines, about 40% live on less than a dollar a day. Most people fish for personal consumption and survival. Fish consumption is estimated at 30 kg per capita in the Philippines. Because fish are becoming scarcer as their reef habitat is gradually destroyed by cyanide and blast fishing, siltation, and bleaching, fishermen must continue to use the cheapest and most reliable methods to bring in their daily catch.

The coral reefs of Indonesia and the Philippines are vital to food security, employment, tourism, and medicinal research. The value of the regions sustainable coral reef fisheries alone is US$2.4 billion a year. These countries rely on the marine resources as a means to diversify their economy. Due to unsafe fishing practices, the coral reefs in these countries are experiencing a decline. There are no pristine coral reefs in the world. Coral reefs in these countries are headed toward becoming ecologically extinct. Without the abundance of Marine resources, the Philippines and Indonesia will experience a major hit to their economy.

The coral reef has been an integral part of Southeast Asian communities for thousands of years. According to Tiffany Adams of Hong Kong, "With the higher demands on the coral reef to produce for the increasing population and the introduction of the world market in the last fifty years, overexploitation has become the most prevalent threat." The explosion of the live reef food fish and aquarium trades as markets has been detrimental to the coral reef. Economic incentives have led to the over fishing of the coral reef and the creation of new technologies to create higher yields of harvest. The use of cyanide and blast fishing has begun to destroy one of the largest coral reef environments in the world. Furthermore, the increased populations have affected the coral reef indirectly. Besides using the reef for economic gain, the increase of people has created pollution. The high levels of development and change in the methods of using the land have led to massive deforestation, which in turn has created a substantial amount of sediments and nutrient loads being placed in coastal environments. Furthermore, attempts to industrialize at the lowest cost possible have led to increased pollution without regulation. To protect and restore the coral reefs many things must be considered. The fishermen and reef harvesters must be given a new method of generating income, one that is sustainable and economically enticing that does not negatively affect the environment. Also, there is a need to manage and regulate the development of the Southeast area and the pollution from this area, while considering the environmental impacts and the economic impacts farther down the road. The task of saving the coral reef in Southeast Asia must occur within the communities which depend upon them. The problem, of a community's abuse and overuse of a natural resource, as created through desperation, poverty and a lack of oversight, cannot be handled by a foreign, external organization or a well-intended NGO. Such as the result of the incredibly successful restoration of Apo Island's reef, the local people must decide as a community to manage the reefs so that they may continue to sustain themselves through this essential resource.

== Dive tourism ==
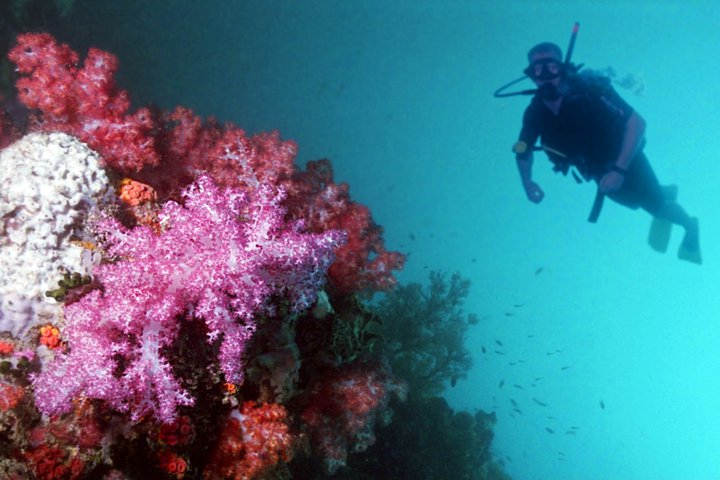
Scuba diver in Sibu Island, Malaysia.

Dive tourism can have negative and positive influences on coral reef ecosystems. It is very important to have tourist education programs to reduce stress on coral reefs caused by tourists who are unaware how easily damaged corals can be. One such negative effect of tourism that can easily be avoided is people walking on coral, and breaking it. Walking near corals also can lead to sediment being stirred up and covering corals, which leads to coral death and makes it very difficult for corals to re-colonize the area. Dive tourism can be beneficial to coral reefs by creating funding for protection programs, including Marine Protected Areas. By simply charging dive fees at certain dive sites, money can be generated for the conservation of coral reefs.

== Marine protected areas ==
Amongst the many proposed solutions to the problems plaguing coral reefs in Southeast Asia is the creation of marine protected areas (MPAs). Currently marine protected areas make up around 8% of the area of Southeast Asian coral reefs. The World Commission on Protected Areas, amongst other groups, has been active in establishing MPAs in Southeast Asia. However, the success rate of MPAs in Southeast Asia is low, with an estimated 14% of MPAs rated effectively managed. This rate reflects the difficulty of implementing MPAs. Moreover, it shows that much work is still needed to make MPAs successful in Southeast Asia.

IUCN has defined an MPA as "any area of intertidal or subtidal terrain, together with its overlying water and associated flora, fauna, historical and cultural features, which has been reserved by law or other effective means to protect part or all of the enclosed environment". In other words, an MPA is a marine area in which the water column and all the life that exists in it are protected through laws. These laws restrict certain practices within the MPA, which can differ per MPA.

Marine protected areas, in sum, provide a marine sanctuary which can foster an increase in marine biodiversity. (See also:). This increased biodiversity is thought to be able to carry over to the non-protected surrounding areas in which fishing can take place. This is important for a number of reasons. In the Southeast Asian context, especially amongst the islands of the Philippines and Indonesia, the sea and people are very much interconnected. As mentioned, the sea provides both a source of income and source of food for the people. In the Philippines, for example, 67% of protein food consumption comes from fish and fish products. Additionally, roughly one million people in the Philippines are employed in the fishing industry. Increased fish stocks resulting from marine protected areas only add to the solutions needed to revitalize Southeast Asian economies, life systems, and coral reefs.

In addition, the LMMA (Locally-Managed Marine Area) Network is another organization that takes part in the Southeast Asia marine conservation. Similar to the MPA, the LMMA also provides protection areas in the sea. However, according to the definition above, an LMMA is an example of an MPA because an MPA includes a large space within and close by the area. The LMMA involves members from around the world, and the communities within the managed areas. The goal of LMMA is to allow members and local communities to learn the uses of protected resources.

Due to the massive destruction of coral reefs in Southeast Asia, the LMMA has established two areas in Eastern Indonesia: Padaido Islands, Biak, West Papua, and Southern Ambon Island and the Moluccas Islands; and various areas in the Philippines. With the help of the LMMAs, the local communities would learn to preserve their marine goods, and be able to maintain for longer years. Gradually, the communities will accommodate bigger and healthier fish.

There are an estimated 400 MPAs in the Philippines. Of the 400 only 16% have yielded an increase in biodiversity. The high failure rate is due to poor management and a lack of regulation. Despite the numerous failures there have been successes. One of the best known areas is Apo island where a small community has effectively managed an MPA since the mid-1980s. The Apo MPA includes a ban on detrimental fishing practices and a no-take zone covering 10% of their reef. Apo's reef has thrived giving hope to Philippine reefs.

== Contributions for management ==
Coral reefs in the Philippines and Indonesia are severely depleted. The Philippines have lost more than 80% since the 1920s. In Indonesia it is a little better due to the some drastic actions by the government. On December 6, 2002, the Asian Development Bank (ADB) approved a US$33 million loan for conservation of these important organisms. Overfishing, illegal fishing methods, and overpopulation have all contributed to the decline of the coral reefs both in the Philippines and Indonesia. Along with the loan the Coral Reef Rehabilitation and Management Project (Phase II), the second part of a three phase plan aims to restore coral reefs in this region. The Ministry of Marine Affairs and Fisheries will oversee the whole entire project with a due date of 2009.

However, government action is not always necessary to manage reefs. When the community dependent on the resources provided by coral works together to save and restore the fish population, the results can be very good. The community managed reefs of Apo Island, located in the southern Philippines, known worldwide for its success. The waters around Apo Island are home to about 650 species of fish and 400 species of corals. The waters of Apo Island were not always this full of life. Fishing is the major occupation on the island, and even those who do not fish, rely on the catch for their protein. So when a fisherman's catch began shortening, after years of unregulated fishing, it was very easy for them to resort to destructive methods of fishing, such as blast fishing and cyanide fishing, to get by. These methods almost led to the end of the already dwindling fish stocks. The community began, through education and widespread involvement, the process of making these practices socially unacceptable. People began patrolling the waters in a small area with the intention of allowing fish to flourish and repopulate and then spill over into areas that had been fished out. This informal establishment of a sanctuary was first met with a lot of resistance, eventually though, after seeing the obvious improvements, the island community and local council were able to formalize the sanctuary in 1985, three years after it started. This formalization extended the sanctuary to water surrounding the island up to 500 meters from the shore and declaring a portion a no-take fish sanctuary.

To manage the coral reefs effectively to preserve what is left of the beautiful natural resource, individual people must unite. If the marine ornamentals trade is to successfully turn around and begin to sustain more live fish, certain people must perform their jobs to the fullest. Firstly, there if lobbyists are responsible about the issue, they will provide healthy animals, maintain healthy reefs, sustain reef animal populations, and adequately compensate fishing communities for their efforts. Also, responsible industry operators must minimize animal mortality and habitat impacts and focus on animal health and quality collection practices. The problem with this method, though, is that merely trust and word of mouth aren't enough. If we are to legitimately stop depleting the coral reefs in Southeast Asia, we must set international standards.

== See also ==
- Coral
- Coral reef
- Fishery
