= Madrepora tenuis =

Madrepora tenuis is an unaccepted scientific name and may refer to two species of corals:

- Acropora tenuis as described by Dana, 1846
- Madrepora oculata as described by Linnaeus, 1758
