= Oslob Church =

Catholic church in Cebu, Philippines

- Our Lady of the Immaculate Conception Parish Church
- Oslob Church
- 9°31′15.5″N 123°26′02.4″E
- Location: Oslob, Cebu
- Country: Philippines
- Denomination: Roman Catholic

History
- Founded: 1847
- Founder: Julian Bermejo
- Dedication: Immaculate Conception

Architecture
- Functional status: Active
- Architectural type: Church building
- Groundbreaking: May 4, 1830
- Completed: 1847 or 1879

Administration
- Archdiocese: Cebu
- Parish: Oslob

The Immaculate Conception Parish Church also known as the Oslob Church is a Roman Catholic church in Oslob, Cebu, Philippines. The structure was built in 1830.

== History ==
=== Pre-construction ===
The settlement of Oslob was placed under a parish ran by the Augustinians. Dealing with personnel shortage, the Augustinians handed the administration of the Oslob parish to the Jesuits from 1737 to 1742.

=== 19th century ===
Roman Catholic priest Julian Bermejo is credited for the construction of the Immaculate Conception Parish Church which laid its foundation in May 4, 1830. The plan was made by Cebu bishop Santos Gómez Marañón. The church was blessed by Fr. Romualdo Gimeno in 1847. Oslob became an independent parish in 1848. However the Cebu Archdiocese claims that the church building itself was completed in 1879

Fr. Apolinar Alvares had the adjacent bell tower built in 1858. Bermejo started construction of the convent and was finished under Fr. Juan Aragones between 1848 and 1850.

=== 20th century ===
In 1932, the replaced the church's tile roof was replaced by galvanized sheets by Fr. Pablo Alva.

The church was burnt during World War II, with the vault and dome subsequently falling. It was razed by fire again in 1955. Fr. Benedicto Zafra started the restoration of the church which continued under Fr. Constantino Batoctoy. The restoration was accomplished in 1980.

=== 21st century ===
The church's interior and roof was razed by fire again in 2008, with the image of the Immaculate Conception surviving the incident.

The church became affiliated with the Papal Basilica of Saint Mary Major in Rome on March 4, 2025.

== Gallery ==
Belfry

Nave and sanctuary

Cuartel ruins outside the church

The church and its surroundings
