= Oslob =

Municipality in Cebu, Philippines

- Municipality
- Municipality of Oslob
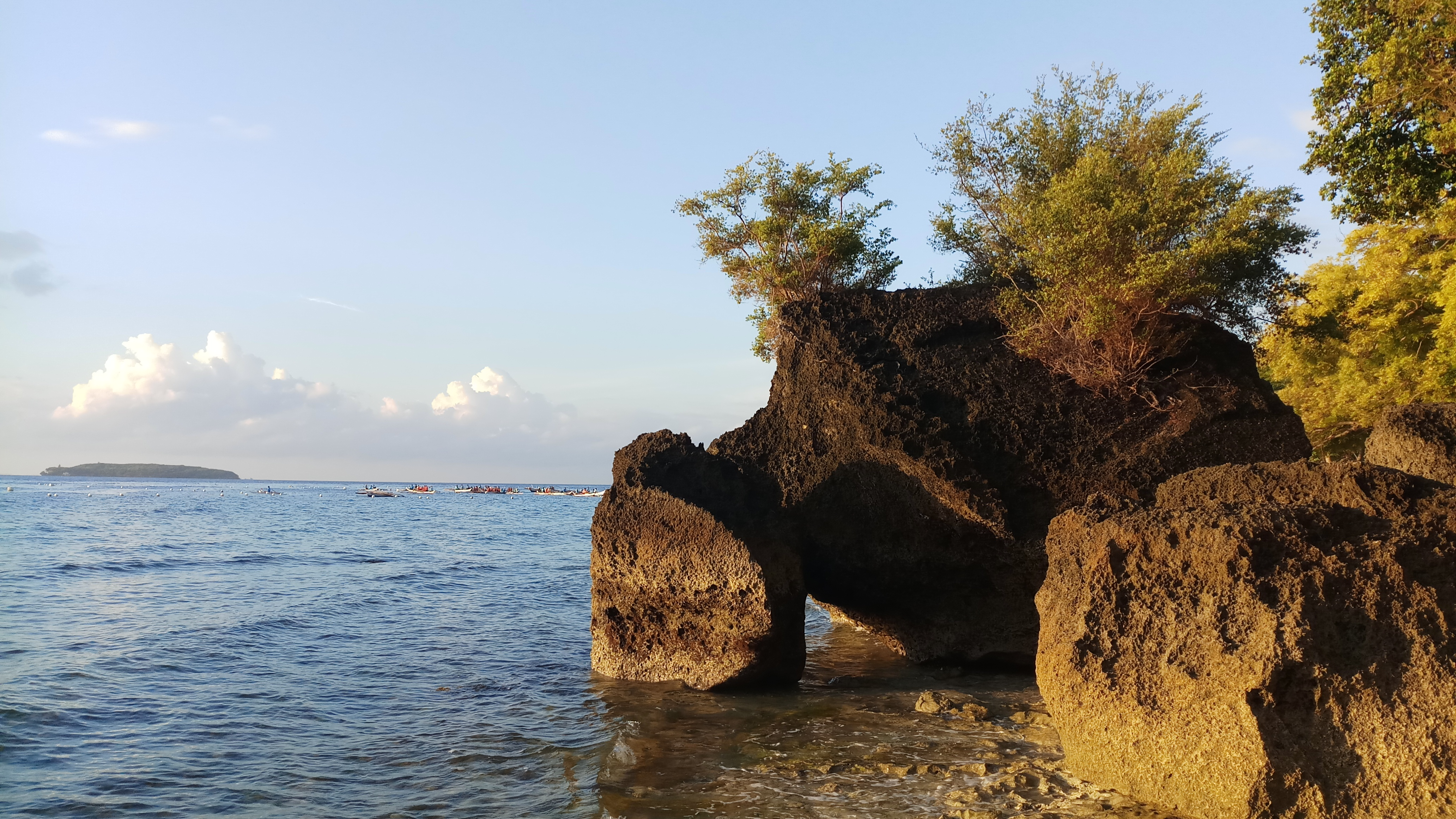
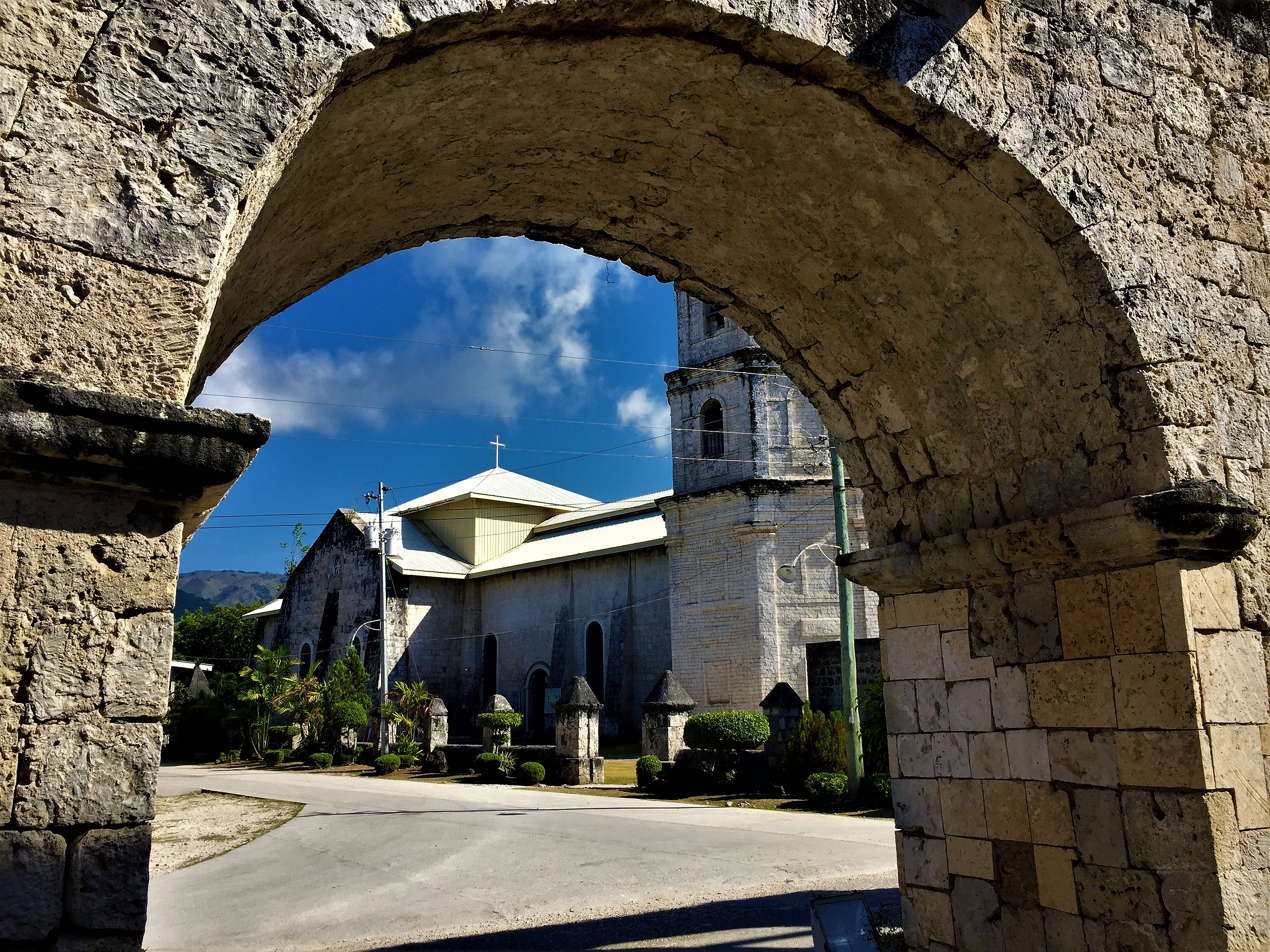
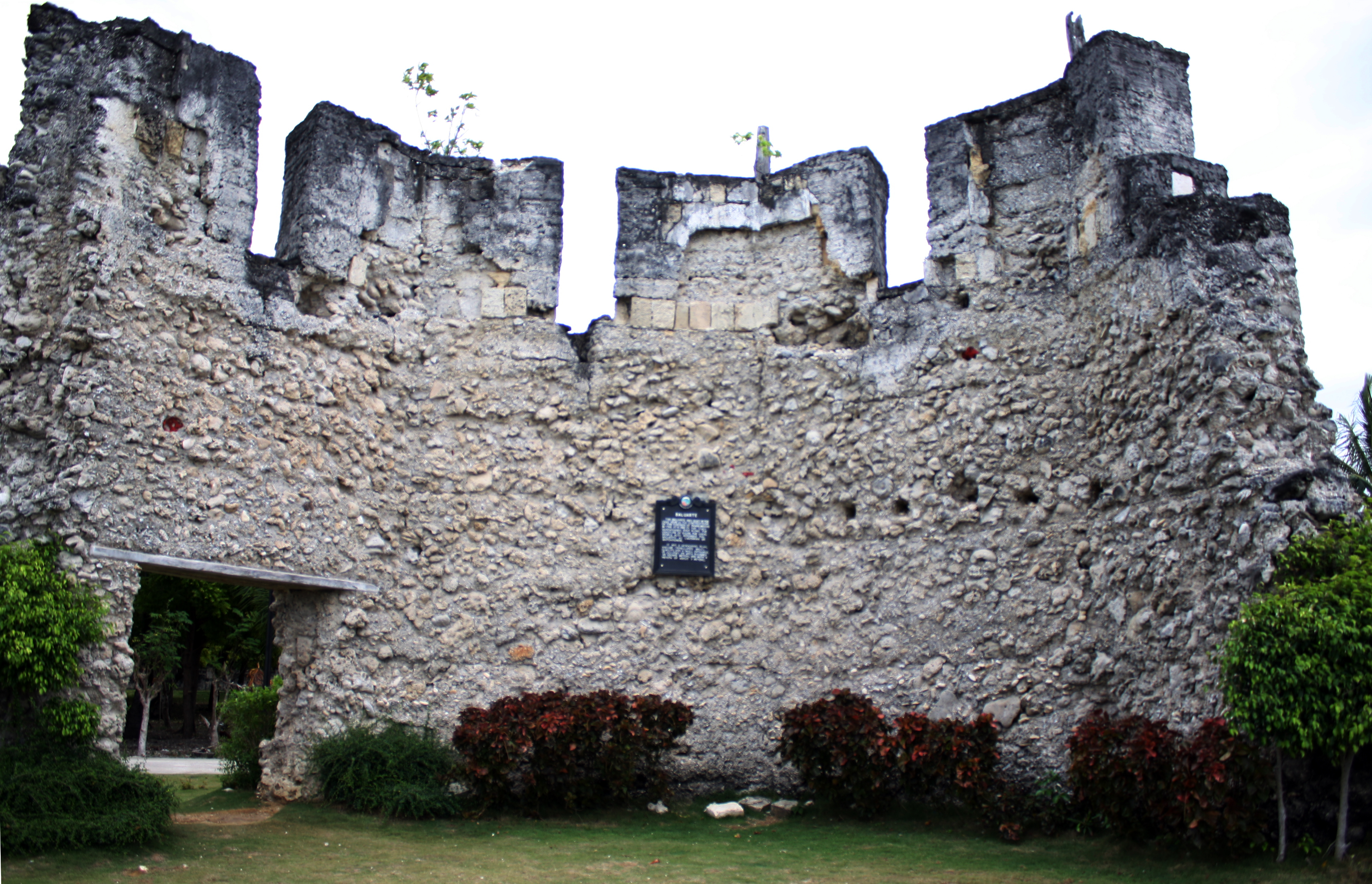
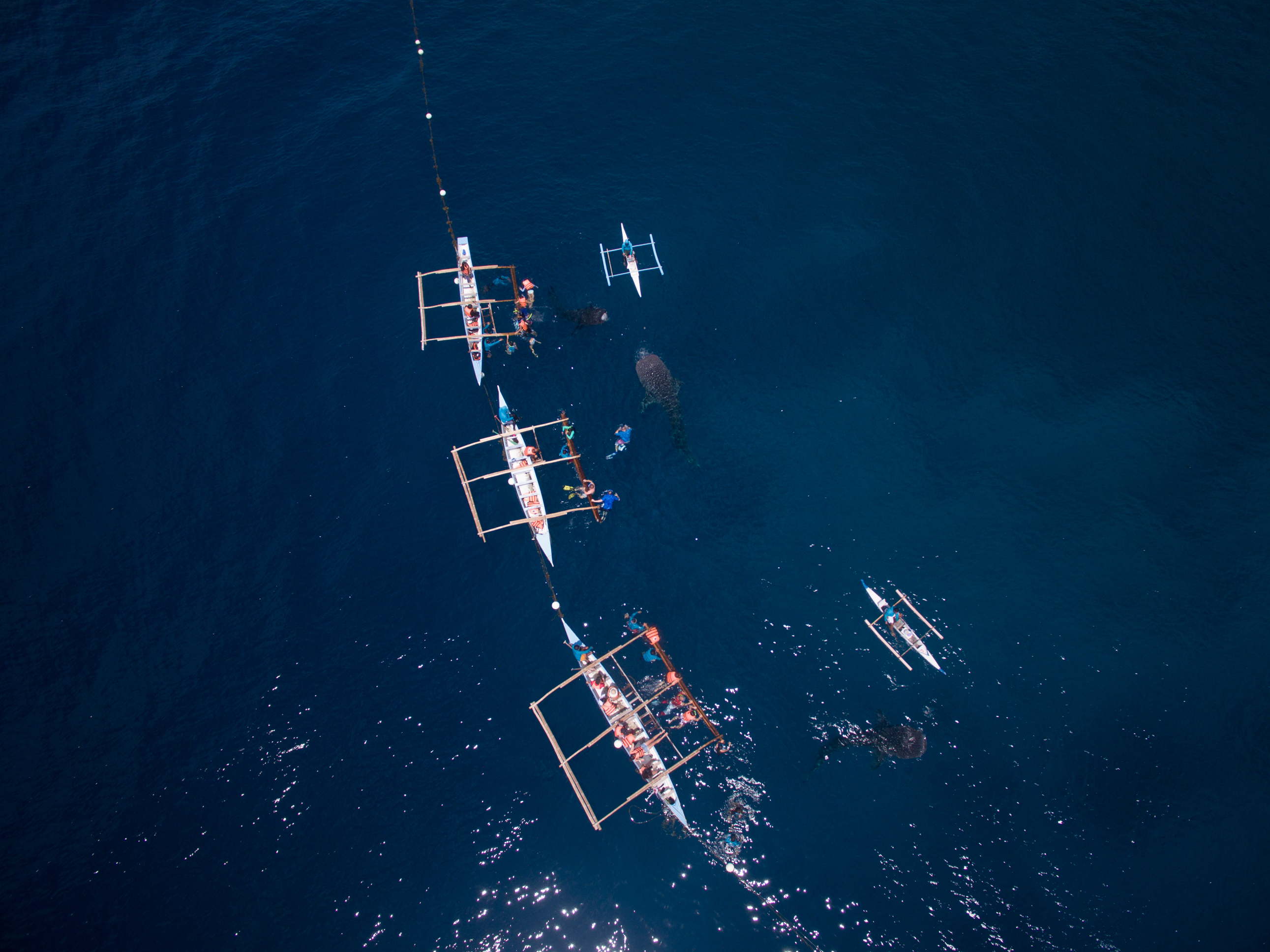
- Tan-awan shore facing Cebu strait View of Oslob Church from the Spanish Cuartel Oslob Baluarte/Lantawan Municipal Hall Whale shark watching at Oslob

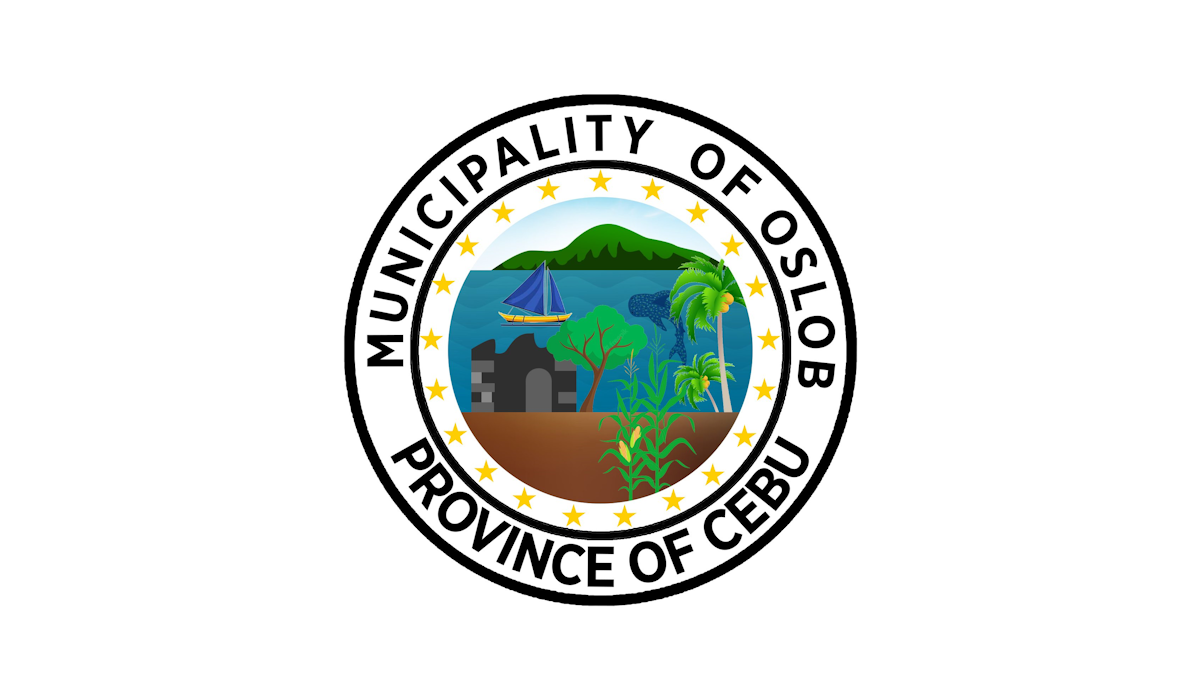
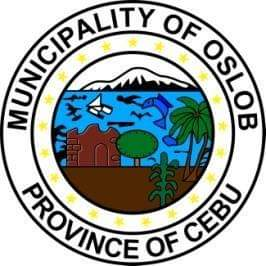
- Flag Seal

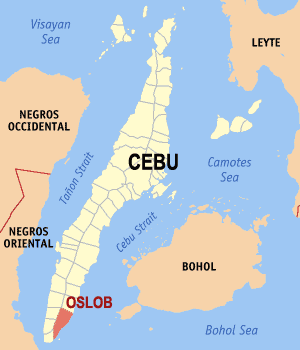
- Map of Cebu with Oslob highlighted
- Interactive map of Oslob
- Location within the Philippines
- Coordinates: 9°33′N 123°24′E
- Country: Philippines
- Region: Central Visayas
- Province: Cebu
- District: 2nd district
- Founded: 1848
- Barangays: 21 (see Barangays)

Government
  - Type: Sangguniang Bayan
  - Mayor: Ronald L. Guaren (1Cebu)
  - Vice mayor: Friedel Ricardo G. Nazareno (1Cebu)
  - Representative: Edsel Galeos (Lakas)
  - Municipal Council: Members: Franz Carl L. Barrera; Ronamarie Therese A. Guaren; Jose Dodjie O. Abines; Carlos L. Mirasol; Ildebrando O. Romares; Gwendolyn S. Gallano; Arturo V. Doroon; Florencio G. Labiste
  - Electorate: 21,303 voters (2025)

Area
  - Total: 134.75 km^{2} (52.03 sq mi)
- Elevation: 142 m (466 ft)
- Highest elevation: 726 m (2,382 ft)
- Lowest elevation: 0 m (0 ft)

Population (2024 census)
  - Total: 29,378
  - Density: 218.02/km^{2} (564.67/sq mi)
  - Households: 6,995

Economy
  - Income class: 1st municipal income class
  - Poverty incidence: 25.98% (2023)
  - Revenue: ₱ 291.9 million (2024)
  - Assets: ₱ 1,347 million (2024)
  - Expenditure: ₱ 179.8 million (2024)
  - Liabilities: ₱ 139.8 million (2024)

Service provider
  - Electricity: Cebu 1 Electric Cooperative (CEBECO 1)
- Time zone: UTC+8 (PST)
- ZIP code: 6025
- PSGC: 072235000
- IDD : area code: +63 (0)32
- Native languages: Cebuano; Tagalog

Oslob, officially the Municipality of Oslob (Cebuano: Lungsod sa Oslob; Tagalog: Bayan ng Oslob), is a municipality in the province of Cebu, Philippines. According to the 2024 census, it has a population of 29,378 people.

== Geography ==
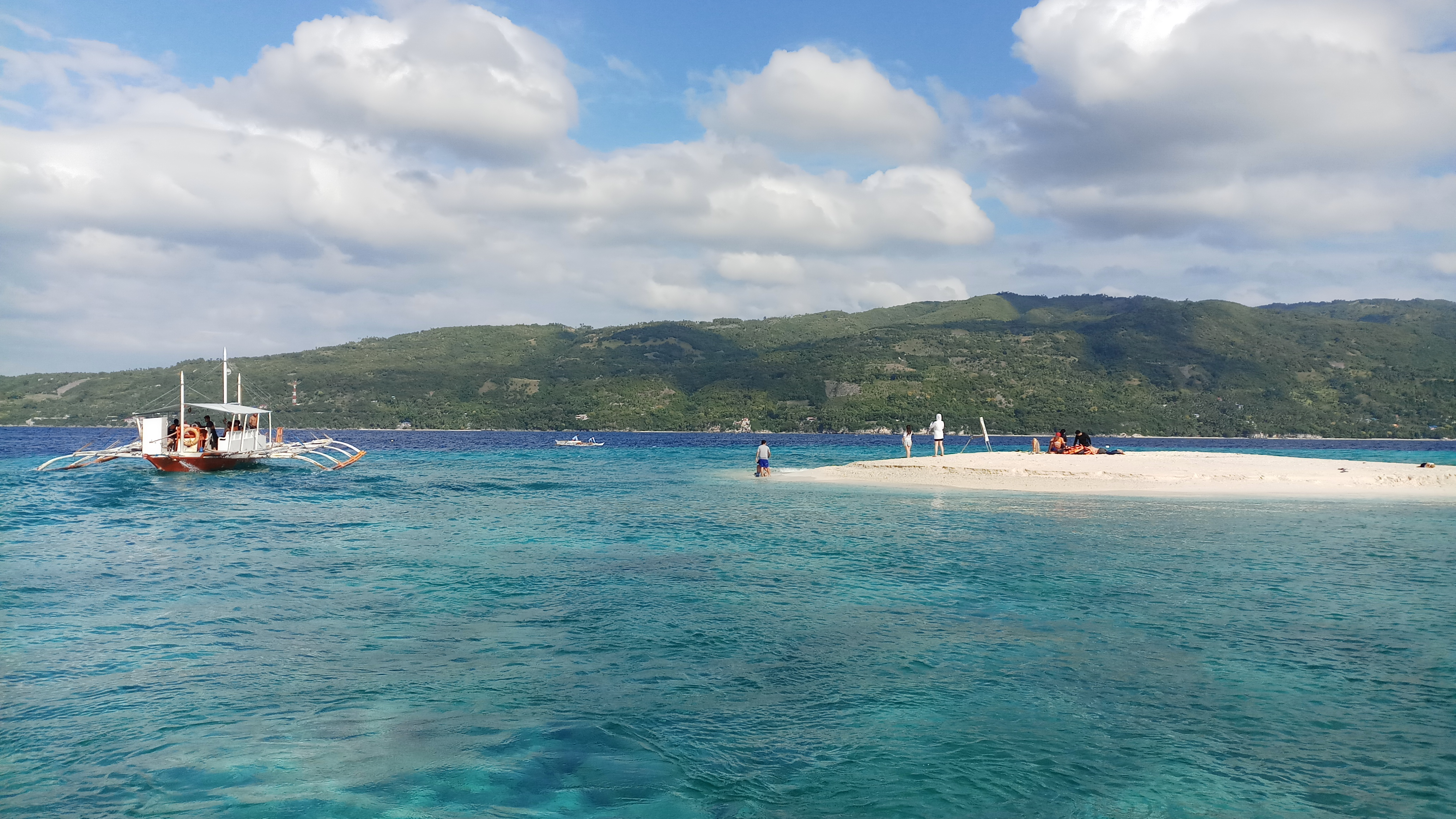
Sumilon Island and its sandbar.

Oslob is bordered to the north by the town of Boljoon, to the west are the towns of Ginatilan and Samboan, to the east is the Cebu Strait, and to the south is the town of Santander. It is 116 kilometres (72 mi) from Cebu City.

=== Topography ===
Generally, the area's topography is hilly and rolling, dominated by open grasslands and second-growth forests. There are fairly level and rolling plateaus and valleys spread throughout the interior. These are some of the most suitable areas for upland agriculture. The highest mountain peak is 800 metres (2,600 ft) above sea level.

=== Land classification ===
Land utilization

Category	Land Area		
Category	ha	acres	
Classified Forest / Reservation / Timberland	9,619	23,770	71.4%
Arable Area	5,045	12,470	37.4%
Certified Alienable / Disposable Land	1,563	3,860	11.6%
Residential	220	540	1.6%
Unclassified Forest Land / Wilderness	66	160	0.5%
Commercial	13	32	0.1%
National Parks / Playgrounds	6	15	0.0%

=== Barangays ===
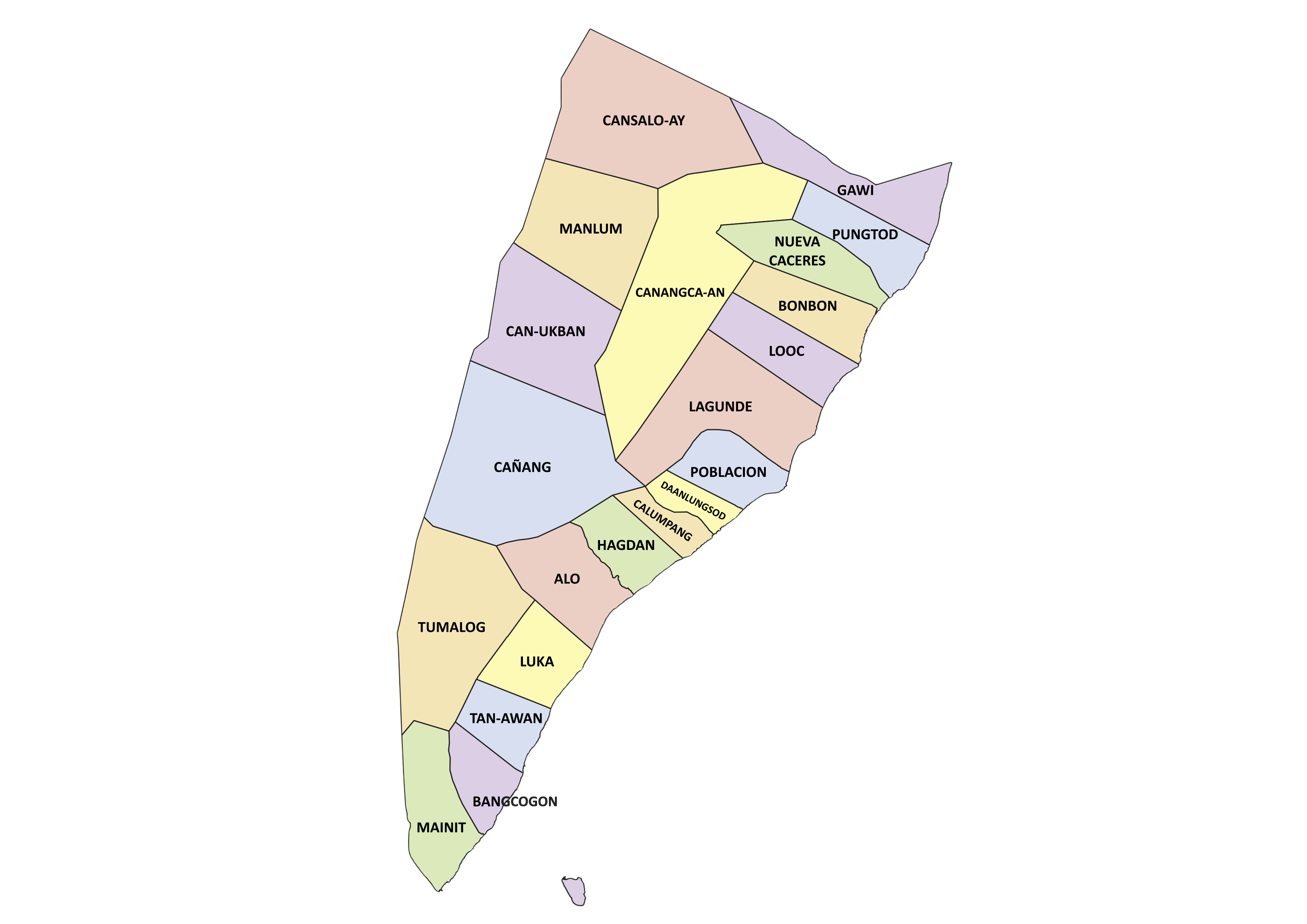
Political map of Oslob

Oslob is politically subdivided into 21 barangays. Each barangay consists of puroks and some have sitios.

PSGC	Barangay	Population			±% p.a.	
		2024		2010		
072235001	Alo	4.1%	1,196	1,389	▾	−1.02%
072235002	Bangcogon	4.2%	1,231	952	▴	1.78%
072235003	Bonbon	5.3%	1,555	1,226	▴	1.65%
072235004	Calumpang	3.5%	1,024	941	▴	0.58%
072235005	Canangca‑an	1.6%	481	603	▾	−1.54%
072235009	Cansalo‑ay	2.3%	681	487	▴	2.33%
072235007	Can‑ukban	2.0%	584	525	▴	0.73%
072235006	Cañang	3.4%	1,009	1,010	▾	−0.01%
072235010	Daanlungsod	5.9%	1,736	1,556	▴	0.75%
072235011	Gawi	6.4%	1,876	1,509	▴	1.51%
072235012	Hagdan	2.5%	731	670	▴	0.60%
072235014	Lagunde	11.1%	3,273	2,829	▴	1.01%
072235015	Looc	4.0%	1,183	1,048	▴	0.84%
072235016	Luka	4.1%	1,210	1,106	▴	0.62%
072235017	Mainit	4.6%	1,339	1,312	▴	0.14%
072235018	Manlum	1.4%	411	456	▾	−0.71%
072235019	Nueva Caceres	4.0%	1,189	991	▴	1.26%
072235020	Poblacion	15.1%	4,446	4,037	▴	0.67%
072235021	Pungtod	5.3%	1,567	1,421	▴	0.67%
072235023	Tan‑awan	5.1%	1,512	1,169	▴	1.78%
072235024	Tumalog	3.5%	1,030	879	▴	1.10%
	Total		29,378	26,116	▴	0.81%

=== Climate ===
Climate data for Oslob, Cebu
Month	Jan	Feb	Mar	Apr	May	Jun	Jul	Aug	Sep	Oct	Nov	Dec	Year
Mean daily maximum °C (°F)	29 (84)	29 (84)	30 (86)	32 (90)	31 (88)	30 (86)	30 (86)	30 (86)	30 (86)	29 (84)	29 (84)	29 (84)	30 (86)
Mean daily minimum °C (°F)	23 (73)	23 (73)	23 (73)	24 (75)	25 (77)	25 (77)	24 (75)	24 (75)	24 (75)	24 (75)	24 (75)	23 (73)	24 (75)
Average precipitation mm (inches)	35 (1.4)	28 (1.1)	38 (1.5)	51 (2.0)	125 (4.9)	195 (7.7)	194 (7.6)	173 (6.8)	180 (7.1)	192 (7.6)	121 (4.8)	64 (2.5)	1,396 (55)
Average rainy days	9.2	8.2	9.9	11.3	22.5	27.3	28.0	27.2	27.1	26.9	19.7	12.7	230
Source: Meteoblue

The municipality of Oslob belongs to Coronas climate type III with a dry season from February to September and the wet season from October.

== Demographics ==
Population census of Oslob

Year	Pop.	±% p.a.
1903	9,819	—
1918	12,351	+1.54%
1939	13,473	+0.41%
1948	13,614	+0.12%
1960	14,497	+0.52%
1970	16,290	+1.17%
1975	18,799	+2.91%
1980	19,053	+0.27%

Year	Pop.	±% p.a.
1990	19,782	+0.38%
1995	21,686	+1.74%
2000	22,472	+0.77%
2007	22,732	+0.16%
2010	26,116	+5.18%
2015	27,893	+1.26%
2020	29,264	+1.02%
2024	29,378	+0.09%

Source: Philippine Statistics Authority

== Culture ==
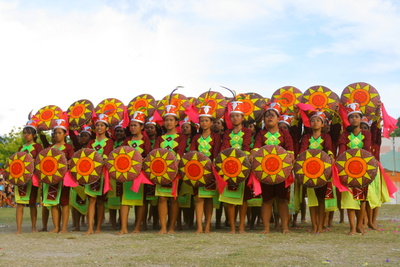
2007 Sadsad festival

Every third week of August, the Sadsad Festival was observed in the barangay of Poblacion to mark the feast day of Saint Roch. The Toslob Festival is held annually every December 8 as a thanksgiving for blessings received the past year from Oslob's patroness, the Immaculate Conception.

Oslob is also noted for its historic town center which has the Immaculate Conception Parish Church, the Cuartel, and the old Municipal Building.

== Economy ==
Poverty incidence of Oslob (%)

Source: Philippine Statistics Authority

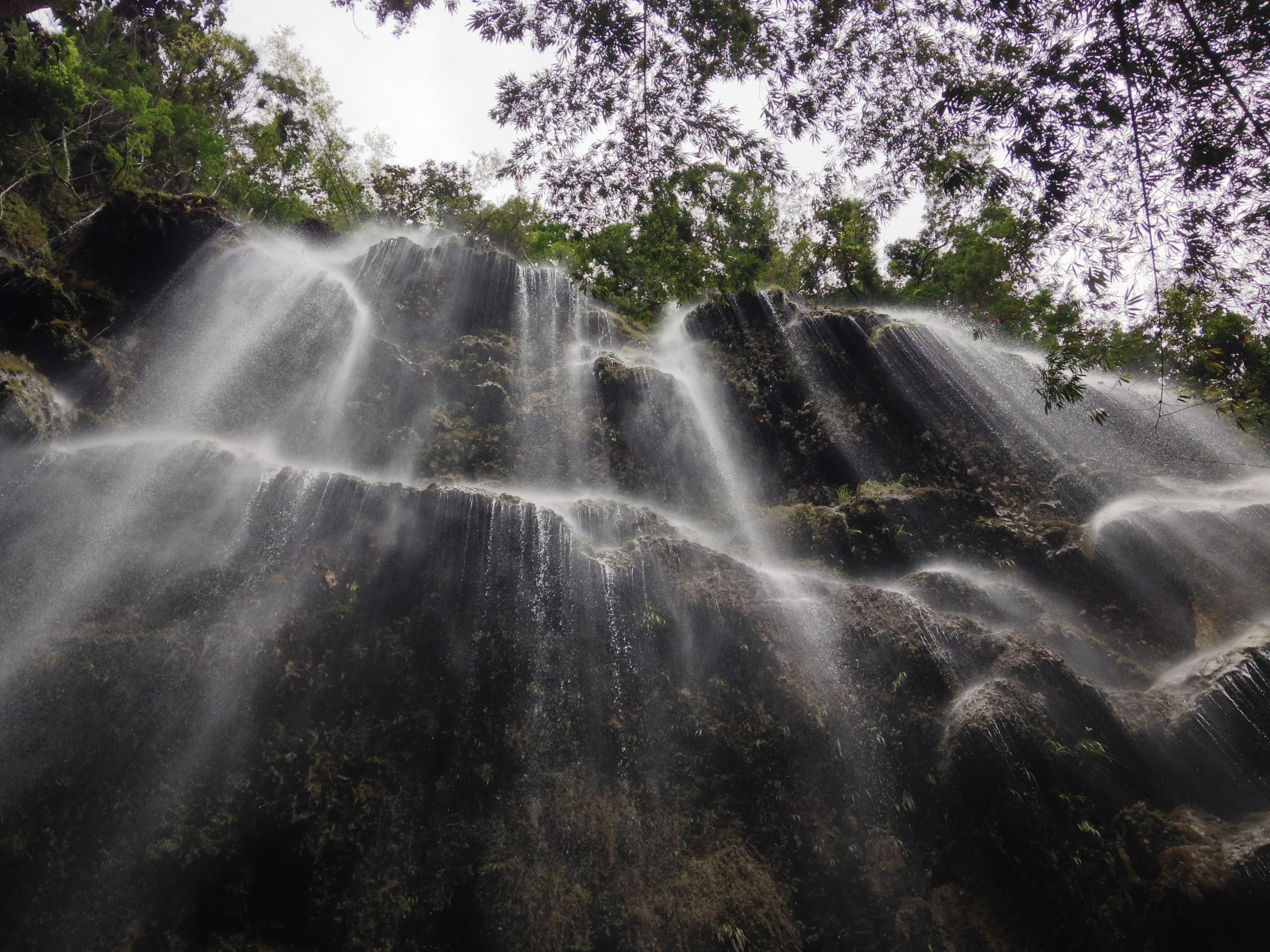
Tumalog Falls

Tourism is an important part of Oslob's economy. The town, especially the village of Tanawan, is known as a site for whale shark watching. It provides as a supplementary of alternative source of livelihood for the town's fisherfolk. It is also known for Sumilon Island for its white-sand bar and diving sites as well as Tumalog Falls.
