= Sumilon Island =

Island in Cebu, Philippines

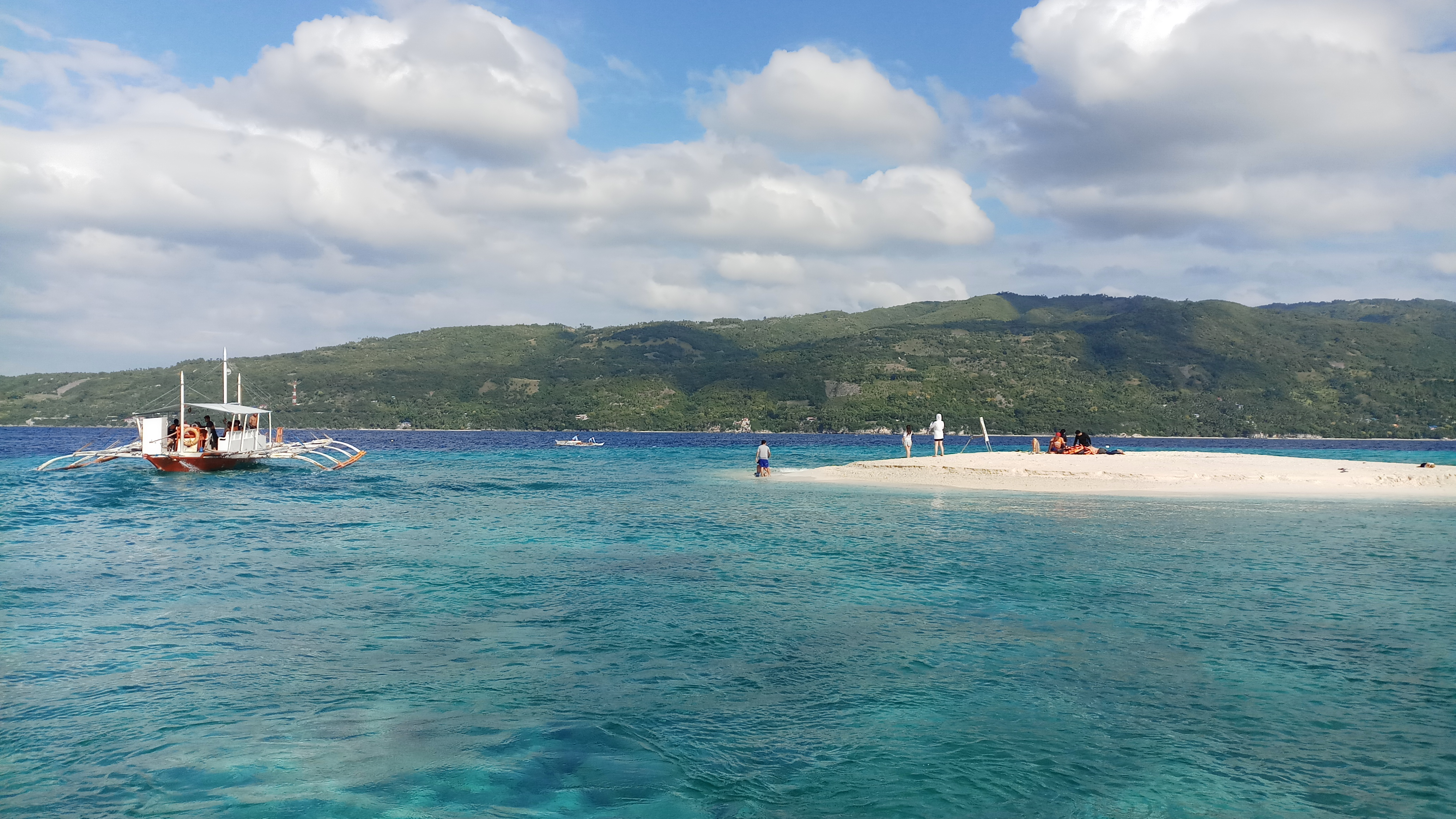
- Sumilon Island and its sandbar
- Interactive map of Sumilon Island

Geography
- Location: Bohol Sea
- Coordinates: 9°25′55.6″N 123°23′21.6″E
- Archipelago: Cebu
- Area: 0.24 km^{2} (0.093 sq mi)

Administration
- Philippines
- Province: Cebu
- Municipality: Oslob

Sumilon Island is an island under the jurisdiction of the municipality of Oslob in the province of Cebu in the Philippines.

== History ==
In the Spanish colonial era in the 19th century, Sumilon Island's watchtower or baluarte served as a defensive structure against Moro pirates.

In 1974, the Silliman University established a marine sanctuary in portions of Sumilon Island during the administration of Oslob Mayor Jose Tumalak. However in the 1980s, the Oslob local government allowed fishing in the area. Some fishers used destructive methods such as muro-ami.

In 2006, the Sumilon Bluewater Resort opened. The owners of the resort however has leased portions of the island since the 1990s.

== Features ==
Sumilon Island is located off the waters of Cebu island and is part of the municipality of Oslob. It measures 0.24 square kilometers (0.093 sq mi).

In 1974, it was reported that the total reef area of Sumilon to 10-meter (33 ft) depth is 328,000 m^{2} (3,530,000 sq ft) and to 40 m (130 ft) depth is 491,000 m^{2} (5,290,000 sq ft) and to

== Tourism ==
Sumilon is promoted as a tourist destination. The Oslob government allows boat operators to transport tourists to the sandbar. 17 hectares (42 acres) of the island is leased to the Sumilon Bluewater Resort. The waters adjacent to Sumilon is a scuba diving site.

It has a lighthouse besides the ruins of the two-storey watchtower or baluarte.
