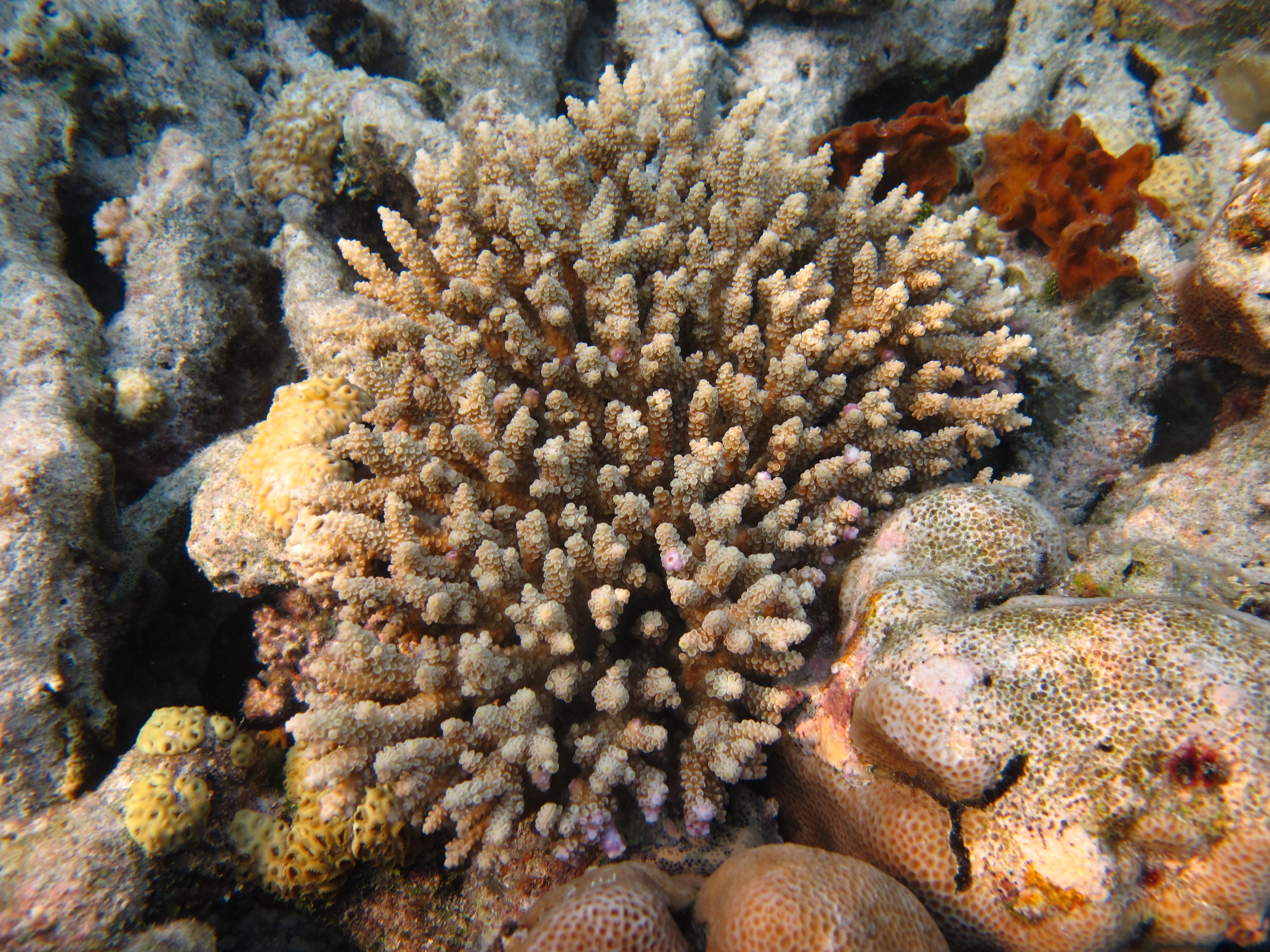

Conservation status
- Near Threatened (IUCN 3.1)

Scientific classification
- Kingdom: Animalia
- Phylum: Cnidaria
- Subphylum: Anthozoa
- Class: Hexacorallia
- Order: Scleractinia
- Family: Acroporidae
- Genus: Acropora
- Species: A. tenuis

Binomial name
- Acropora tenuis (Dana, 1846)

Synonyms
- List: Acropora africana (Brook, 1893); Acropora kenti (Brook, 1892); Acropora macrostoma (Brook, 1891); Acropora plana Nemenzo, 1967; Madrepora africana Brook, 1893; Madrepora bifaria Brook, 1892; Madrepora kenti Brook, 1892; Madrepora macrostoma Brook, 1891; Madrepora tenuis Dana, 1846

= Acropora tenuis =

Species of coral

Acropora tenuis is a species of acroporid coral found in the Red Sea, the Gulf of Aden, the southwest, northwest and northern Indian Ocean, the Persian Gulf, the central Indo-Pacific, Australia, Southeast Asia, Japan, the East China Sea and the oceanic west and central Pacific Ocean. It occurs in tropical shallow reefs on upper slopes and in subtidal habitats, at depths of 8 to 20 metres (26 to 66 ft).

== Description ==
It occurs in corymbose colonies containing orderly-spaced branchlets. It has tube-shaped axial corallites and radial corallites have flaring lips. It is blue, cream, yellow or green in colour, and is similar to Acropora vermiculata.

== Distribution ==
It is classed as a near threatened species on the IUCN Red List and it is believed that its population is decreasing; the species is listed under Appendix II of CITES. Figures of its population are unknown, but is likely to be threatened by the global reduction of coral reefs, the increase of temperature causing coral bleaching, climate change, human activity, the crown-of-thorns starfish (Acanthaster planci) and disease. It occurs in the Red Sea, the Gulf of Aden, the southwest, northwest and northern Indian Ocean, the Persian Gulf, the central Indo-Pacific, Australia, Southeast Asia, Japan, the East China Sea, and the oceanic western and central Pacific Ocean. It is found at depths of between 8 and 20 metres (26 and 66 ft) in tropical shallow reefs on upper slopes and in subtidal areas.

== Biology ==
Acropora tenuis is a simultaneous hermaphrodite. Spawning takes place once a year and is synchronised among the colonies in any one locality. Packets of eggs and sperm are released into the water column and, being buoyant, rise to the surface. Here the packets break up and cross-fertilisation takes place with gametes from different colonies intermixing.
