= 1992 Makati local elections =

Local elections in the Philippines

1992 Makati mayoral election
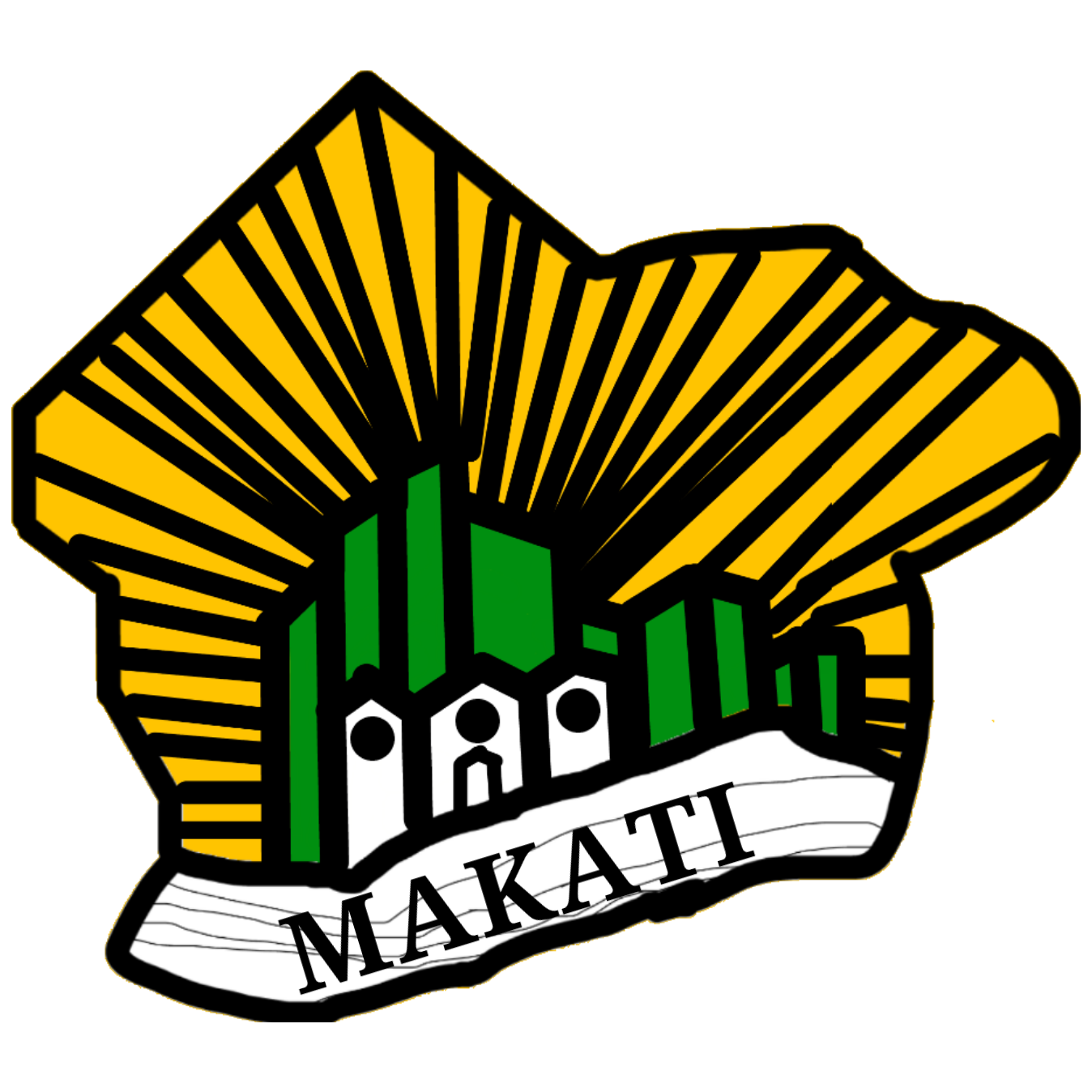
- May 11, 1992
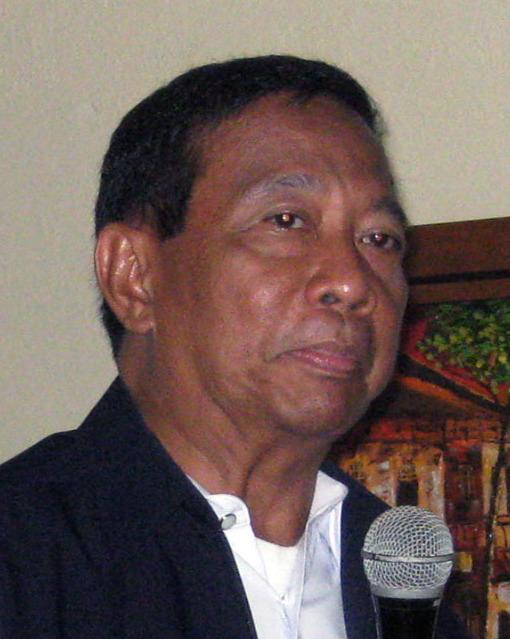

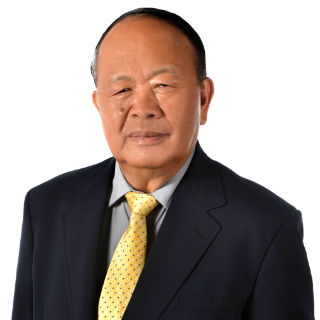

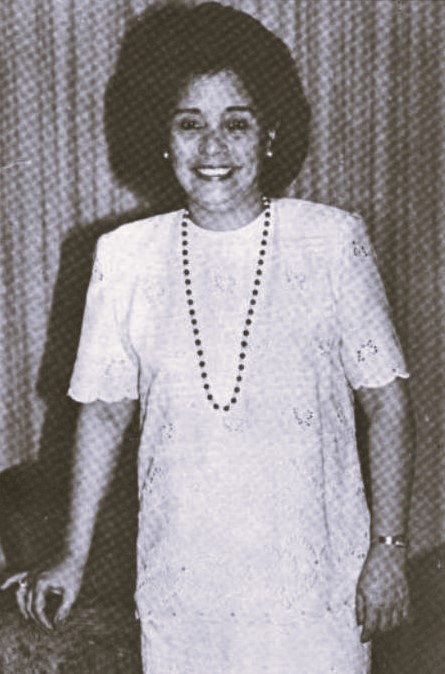

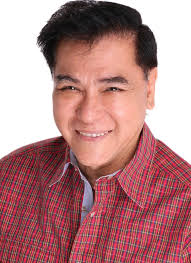
Nominee	Jejomar Binay	Ramon Montaño	Baby Puyat-Reyes
Party	PDP–Laban	NPC	LDP
Alliance	Matapat na Pangkat	Move Makati Coalition	Team Laban Makati
Running mate	Pacifico R. Reyes	Felicisimo P. Bascon Jr.	Nicolas Enciso VI
Popular vote	117,408	50,125	38,876
Percentage	52.37	22.36	17.34
Nominee	Roberto Brillante Sr.	Alexander Villalon	Nestor Buena
Party	KBL	KBL	PRP
Alliance	Team Batang Makati	Team KBL Makati	Team PRP Makati
Running mate	Nemesio Arturo "Toro" Yabut III	Wendelino Rivera	Aurelio Reyes
Popular vote	16,188	1,049	315
Percentage	7.22	0.46	0.14
Mayor before election
Jejomar Binay
PDP–Laban
Elected mayor
Jejomar Binay
PDP–Laban
- Vice mayoral election
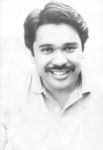

Candidate	Nemesio Arturo "Toro" Yabut	Pacifico R. Reyes	Nicolas "Nick" C. Enciso VI
Party	KBL	PDP–Laban	LDP
Alliance	Team Batang Makati	Matapat na Pangkat	Team Laban Makati
Popular vote	103,039	63,638	16,365
Percentage	49.27	30.43	7.82
Candidate	Aurelio "Relly" H. Reyes Jr.	Jose C. Luciano	Felicisimo P. Bascon Jr.
Party	Independent	Emancipated Scientists Party	NPC
Alliance	Team PRP Makati		Move Makati Coalition
Popular vote	10,043	8,347	6,550
Percentage	4.80	3.99	3.14
Candidate	Wendelino V. Rivera
Party	KBL
Alliance	Team KBL Makati
Popular vote	1,132
Percentage	0.54
Vice Mayor before election
Elena Maccay
NPC
Elected Vice Mayor
Nemesio Arturo "Toro" Yabut III
KBL

Local elections was held in the Municipality of Makati on May 11, 1992, within the 1992 Philippine general election. The voters elected for the elective local posts in the municipality: the mayor, vice mayor, the lone district representative, and the councilors, six in each of the town's two administrative districts. This was the first election in which the elections for the national and local positions were conducted simultaneously and the first to elect councilors by district rather than at-large. This was also the last post-1986 local election in which Makati is still a municipality, as the town will be a chartered city by January 2, 1995.

== Background ==
Incumbent mayor and PDP–Laban candidate Jejomar Binay ran for a second term following his election as mayor in 1988. He selected incumbent councilor Pacifico R. Reyes as his running-mate.

Binay's challengers were retired police general Ramon Montaño of Nationalist People's Coalition, lone district representative Baby Puyat-Reyes of the Laban ng Demokratikong Pilipino, former Makati Vice Mayor Roberto "Bobby" Brillante Sr. of the Kilusang Bagong Lipunan, 1984 assemblyman candidate Alexander Villalon, also from Kilusang Bagong Lipunan, Nestor Buena of the People's Reform Party and independent candidate Wilfredo Miranda.

For the vice-mayoralty, Reyes faced Nemesio Arturo "Toro" Yabut III from the Kilusang Bagong Lipunan, son of former Makati Mayor Nemesio Yabut Sr., Nicolas Enciso VI (Laban ng Demokratikong Pilipino), Aurelio "Relly" Reyes (Independent), former Makati Mayor Jose Luciano (Emancipated Scientists Party), Makati ABC president Felicisimo Bascon Jr. (Nationalist People's Coalition), and Wendelino Rivera (Kilusang Bagong Lipunan).

== Candidates ==
=== Matapat na Pangkat ===
PDP–Laban/Liberal Party/Nacionalista Party/Matapat na Pangkat
Name	Party
For Mayor
Jejomar "Jojo" C. Binay	PDP–Laban
For Vice Mayor
Pacifico R. Reyes	PDP–Laban
For House Of Representative (Lone District)
Ceferino "Joker" P. Arroyo Jr.	Independent
For Councilor (1st District)
Rosalinda L. Bondal	Independent
Raul "Oloy" S. Javier	Independent
Meynardo L. Gonzales	Independent
Armando C. San Miguel Sr.	PDP–Laban
Michael M. Joseph	PDP–Laban
Ferdinand V. Estrella	Liberal
For Councilor (2nd District)
Nenita R. Licaros	PDP–Laban
Elias "Boy" V. Tolentino	Nacionalista
Pedro A. Ibay	PDP–Laban
Ernesto "Nestor" S. Mercado	PDP–Laban
Antonio "Tony" G. Manalili	PDP–Laban
Antonio D. Sinchioco	PDP–Laban

=== Move Makati Coalition ===
Nationalist People's Coalition/Move Makati Coalition
Name	Party
For Mayor
Ramon Montaño	NPC
For Vice Mayor
Felicisimo P. Bascon Jr.	NPC
For House Of Representative (Lone District)
Augusto "Boboy" L. Syjuco Jr.	NPC
For Councilor (1st District)
Ildefonso S. Gervasio	NPC
Melvin Kirk J. Yabut Jr.	NPC
Araceli M. Pimentel	NPC
Alejandro Jimenez Jr.	NPC
Violeta L. Marcelo	NPC
Filemon N. Sarono	NPC
For Councilor (2nd District)
Elena B. Maccay	NPC
Benjamin R. Corpuz	NPC
Anita B. delos Reyes	NPC
Leopoldo L. Navarro	NPC
Pedro M. Sacro	NPC
Iñigo G. Colingay Sr.	NPC

=== Team Laban Makati ===
Laban ng Demokratikong Pilipino/Liberal Party/Team Laban Makati
Name	Party
For Mayor
Maria Consuelo "Baby" Puyat-Reyes	LDP
For Vice Mayor
Nicolas "Nick" C. Enciso VI	LDP
For House Of Representative (Lone District)
Bing Soledad	Liberal
For Councilor (1st District)
Gabriel "Bong" V. Daza III	LDP
Cesar C. Alzona	LDP
Felix G. Quiambao	LDP
Puring I. Ocampo	LDP
Miguel Cliff T. Yabut	LDP
Rolando G. Orca	LDP
For Councilor (2nd District)
Iluminado G. Alonsagay	LDP
Rodolfo M. Moreno	LDP
Dionisio R. delos Santos	LDP
Brenda G. Sario	LDP
Eladio B. Baluyut Sr.	Independent
Juanito A. Conol Jr.	Independent

=== Team Batang Makati ===
Kilusang Bagong Lipunan/Team Batang Makati
Name	Party
For Mayor
Roberto "Bobby" G. Brillante Sr.	KBL
For Vice Mayor
Nemesio Arturo "Toro" S. Yabut III	KBL
For House Of Representative (Lone District)
Jose Fidel B. Coronel	KBL
For Councilor (1st District)
Felix A. Gomez III	KBL
Francisco U. Malabed Jr.	KBL
Ferdinand M. Ramos	KBL
George B. Gaduang	KBL
Enrico F. Diaz	KBL
Elmer P. Hernandez	KBL
For Councilor (2nd District)
Ben-Hur B. Baniqued	KBL
Alfredo M. Ripoll	KBL
Angel L. Sadang	KBL
Jose S. Alamis	KBL
Romeo S. Rodriguez	KBL
Ernesto "Estong" S. Mercado	KBL

=== Team KBL Makati ===
Kilusang Bagong Lipunan/Team KBL Makati
Name	Party
For Mayor
Alexander J. Villalon	KBL
For Vice Mayor
Wendelino V. Rivera	KBL
For House Of Representative (Lone District)
Napoleon J. delos Santos	KBL
For Councilor (1st District)
Teresita S. Marfori	KBL
Amante F. Ares	KBL
Angelina C. Lasay	KBL
Jesus S. de Castro	KBL
Alfredo P. Tanael	KBL
Lincoln M. Cuyugan	Independent
For Councilor (2nd District)
Florencio A. Apid Jr.	KBL
Antidio O. Obaldo	KBL
Emilio T. Mendoza	KBL
Filoteo P. Quintana	KBL
Esteban P. Fernandez	KBL
Alexander G. Ibalio	KBL

=== Team PRP Makati ===
People's Reform Party/Team PRP Makati
Name	Party
For Mayor
Nestor V. Buena	PRP
For Vice Mayor
Aurelio "Relly" H. Reyes Jr.	Independent
For House Of Representative (Lone District)
Ferdinand Habijan	PRP
For Councilor (1st District)
Raminder K. Gill	PRP
Rustom B. Telig	PRP
For Councilor (2nd District)
Danilo M. Pangan	PRP
Manuel A. Catalan	PRP
Ramon J. Guarra	PRP
Wilfredo V. Lara	PRP
Ismael P. Casasola	PRP
Paterno H. Degoma Jr.	PRP

Independent Candidates
Name	Party
For Mayor
Wilfredo R. Miranda	Independent
For Councilor (1st District)
Cesar C. Rizon	Independent
Jay Fideli A. Francisco	Independent
Ramon V. Tiaoqui	Independent
For Councilor (2nd District)
Paulino M. Asuncion Jr.	Independent
Daniel D. Tiamzon	Independent
Fidel V. San Pedro	Independent
Anacleto O. Villahermosa	Independent
Rosalio D. Rodriguez	Independent

=== Team Koalisyong Pambansa ===
Liberal Party (Philippines)
For House Of Representative (Lone District)
Bing Soledad	Liberal
For Councilor (1st District)
Dario B. Fajardo	Liberal
Conrado A. Estreller Jr.	Liberal
For Councilor (2nd District)
Enecilo C. Felicilda Jr.	Liberal

Partido ng Bayan
For Councilor (2nd District)
Mischa Nicanor "Nick" B. Elman	PnB

Emancipated Scientists Party
For Vice Mayor
Jose C. Luciano	Emancipated Scientists Party

Lakas-NUCD-UMDP
For Councilor (1st District)
Ernesto F. Ventura	Lakas

Kilusang Bagong Lipunan
For Councilor (2nd District)
Domingo B. Torres	KBL

== Results ==
=== Mayor ===
Incumbent mayor Jejomar Binay won against six other mayoralty contenders.

1992 Makati mayoral election
Candidate	Party	Votes	%
Jejomar Binay	PDP–Laban	117,408	52.38
Ramon Montaño	Nationalist People's Coalition	50,125	22.36
Baby Puyat-Reyes	Laban ng Demokratikong Pilipino	38,876	17.34
Roberto "Bobby" Brillante Sr.	Kilusang Bagong Lipunan	16,188	7.22
Alexander Villalon	Kilusang Bagong Lipunan	1,049	0.47
Nestor Buena	People's Reform Party	315	0.14
Wilfredo Miranda	Independent	194	0.09
Total		224,155	100.00
PDP–Laban hold			
Source: Commission on Elections

=== Vice Mayor ===
Former councilor Arturo "Toro" Yabut won against six other candidates.

1992 Makati vice mayoral election
Candidate	Party	Votes	%
Nemesio Arturo "Toro" Yabut III	Kilusang Bagong Lipunan	103,039	49.27
Pacifico Reyes	PDP–Laban	63,638	30.43
Nicolas "Nick" Enciso VI	Laban ng Demokratikong Pilipino	16,365	7.83
Aurelio "Relly" Reyes Jr.	Independent	10,043	4.80
Jose C. Luciano	Emancipated Scientists Party	8,347	3.99
Felicisimo Bascon Jr.	Nationalist People's Coalition	6,550	3.13
Wendelino Rivera	Kilusang Bagong Lipunan	1,132	0.54
Total		209,114	100.00
Kilusang Bagong Lipunan gain from Nationalist People's Coalition			

=== Makati's lone district representative ===
Lawyer Joker Arroyo (Independent) was elected as the representative of Makati's lone congressional district, defeating five other contenders.

1992 Makati Lone District Representative election
Candidate	Party	Votes	%
Joker Arroyo	Independent	97,055	46.66
Augusto Syjuco Jr.	Nationalist People's Coalition	84,398	40.57
Bing Soledad	Liberal Party	15,841	7.62
Jose Fidel Coronel	Kilusang Bagong Lipunan	9,239	4.44
Ferdinand Habijan	People's Reform Party	974	0.47
Napoleon delos Santos	Kilusang Bagong Lipunan	510	0.25
Total		208,017	100.00
Independent gain from PDP–Laban			

However, on January 25, 1995, Arroyo's victory was annulled by the House of Representatives Electoral Tribunal (HRET), as a result of an electoral protest filed by Augusto Syjuco Jr., citing irregularities in the vote count at most precincts. Arroyo challenged the HRET ruling and filed a counter-protest questioning Syjuco's residency, which was eventually dismissed. The ruling was later reversed on July 14, 1995, two weeks after his first term ended.

=== City Council ===
==== 1st District ====
Five out of six winning candidates came from Binay's "Matapat na Pangkat", while Gabriel "Bong" Daza III, a candidate of Baby Puyat-Reyes's "Team Laban Makati", topped the council elections in this district.

City Council election at Makati's 1st district
Party	Candidate	Votes	%
LDP	Gabriel "Bong" Daza III	53,572	
Independent	Rosalinda L. Bondal	50,874	
Liberal	Ferdinand V. Estrella	47,030	
Independent	Meynardo L. Gonzales	46,708	
Independent	Raul "Oloy" S. Javier	46,579	
PDP–Laban	Michael M. Joseph	44,858	
PDP–Laban	Armando C. San Miguel Sr.	32,724	
NPC	Ildefonso S. Gervasio	23,500	
NPC	Melvin Kirk J. Yabut Jr.	22,064	
NPC	Araceli M. Pimentel	20,157	
NPC	Alejandro L. Jimenez Jr.	16,993	
LDP	Cesar C. Alzona	15,440	
Independent	Cesar C. Rizon	14,579	
LDP	Felix G. Quiambao	13,263	
NPC	Violeta L. Marcelo	11,579	
LDP	Puring I. Ocampo	11,394	
LDP	Miguel Cliff T. Yabut	11,072	
LDP	Rolando G. Orca	10,898	
KBL	Felix A. Gomez III	10,718	
Lakas	Ernesto F. Ventura	9,443	
NPC	Filemon N. Sarono	9,000	
Independent	Jay Fideli A. Francisco	6,214	
KBL	Francisco U. Malabed Jr.	5,975	
KBL	Ferdinand M. Ramos	5,430	
Liberal	Dario B. Fajardo	4,513	
KBL	George B. Gaduang	4,435	
Liberal	Conrado A. Estreller Jr.	3,535	
KBL	Enrico F. Diaz	2,598	
KBL	Elmer P. Hernandez	2,436	
KBL	Teresita S. Marfori	2,178	
KBL	Amante F. Ares	2,162	
KBL	Angelina C. Lasay	2,152	
KBL	Jesus S. de Castro	1,715	
Independent	Lincoln M. Cuyugan	1,428	
KBL	Alfredo P. Tanael	986	
PRP	Raminder K. Gill	739	
PRP	Rustom B. Telig	480	
Independent	Ramon V. Tiaoqui	364	

==== 2nd District ====
Five out of six winning candidates came from Binay's "Matapat na Pangkat", while Elena Maccay, a candidate of Ramon Montaño's "Move Makati Coalition", placed second in the council elections in this district.

City Council election at Makati's 2nd district
Party	Candidate	Votes	%
PDP–Laban	Nenita R. Licaros	49,041	
NPC	Elena B. Maccay	44,825	
Nacionalista	Elias "Boy" V. Tolentino	42,381	
PDP–Laban	Pedro A. Ibay	40,614	
PDP–Laban	Antonio "Tony" G. Manalili	36,123	
PDP–Laban	Ernesto "Nestor" S. Mercado	33,095	
PDP–Laban	Antonio D. Sinchioco	29,551	
NPC	Benjamin R. Corpuz	15,067	
NPC	Anita B. delos Reyes	15,050	
KBL	Ben-Hur B. Baniqued	14,160	
NPC	Leopoldo L. Navarro	13,699	
NPC	Pedro M. Sacro	12,815	
PnB	Mischa Nicanor "Nick" D. Elman	12,078	
Independent	Eladio B. Baluyut Sr.	11,959	
KBL	Angel L. Sadang	10,214	
LDP	Iluminado G. Alonsagay	9,241	
NPC	Inigo G. Colingay Sr.	9,048	
LDP	Rodolfo M. Moreno	7,805	
LDP	Dionisio R. de los Santos	7,657	
KBL	Jose S. Alamis	7,370	
KBL	Romeo S. Rodriguez	5,685	
LDP	Brenda G. Sario	5,566	
PRP	Danilo M. Pangan	4,195	
KBL	Ernesto "Estong" S. Mercado	4,068	
KBL	Alfredo M. Ripoll	3,942	
KBL	Antidio O. Obaldo	3,437	
KBL	Emilio T. Mendoza	3,178	
Liberal	Enecilo C. Felicilda Jr.	3,044	
Independent	Juanito A. Conol Jr.	2,983	
KBL	Filoteo P. Quintana	2,812	
Independent	Paulino M. Asuncion Jr.	2,798	
KBL	Esteban P. Fernandez	2,619	
KBL	Alexander G. Ibalio	2,565	
Independent	Daniel D. Tiamzon	2,382	
Independent	Fidel V. San Pedro	2,346	
Independent	Anacleto O. Villahermosa	1,840	
KBL	Florencio A. Apid Jr.	1,667	
PRP	Manuel A. Catalan	1,601	
PRP	Ramon J. Guarra	1,215	
PRP	Wilfredo V. Lara	1,180	
PRP	Ismael P. Casasota	906	
Independent	Rosalio D. Rodriguez	642	
PRP	Paterno H. Degoma Jr.	598	
KBL	Domingo B. Torres	300	

== Aftermath ==
Mayor Jejomar Binay ran and won for his last term in 1995. He and his family will dominate Makati local politics for the next 30 years starting with his wife, Elenita, who served as mayor for three years (1998 to 2001). Jejomar returned as mayor from 2004 to 2010, and was succeeded by his son Junjun from 2010 to 2015. Two of his daughters, Abby and Nancy, will serve as Makati mayors as well, with Abby from 2016 to 2025, and Nancy as the current mayor of the city.
