= 1988 Makati local elections =

Local elections in the Philippines

1988 Makati mayoral election
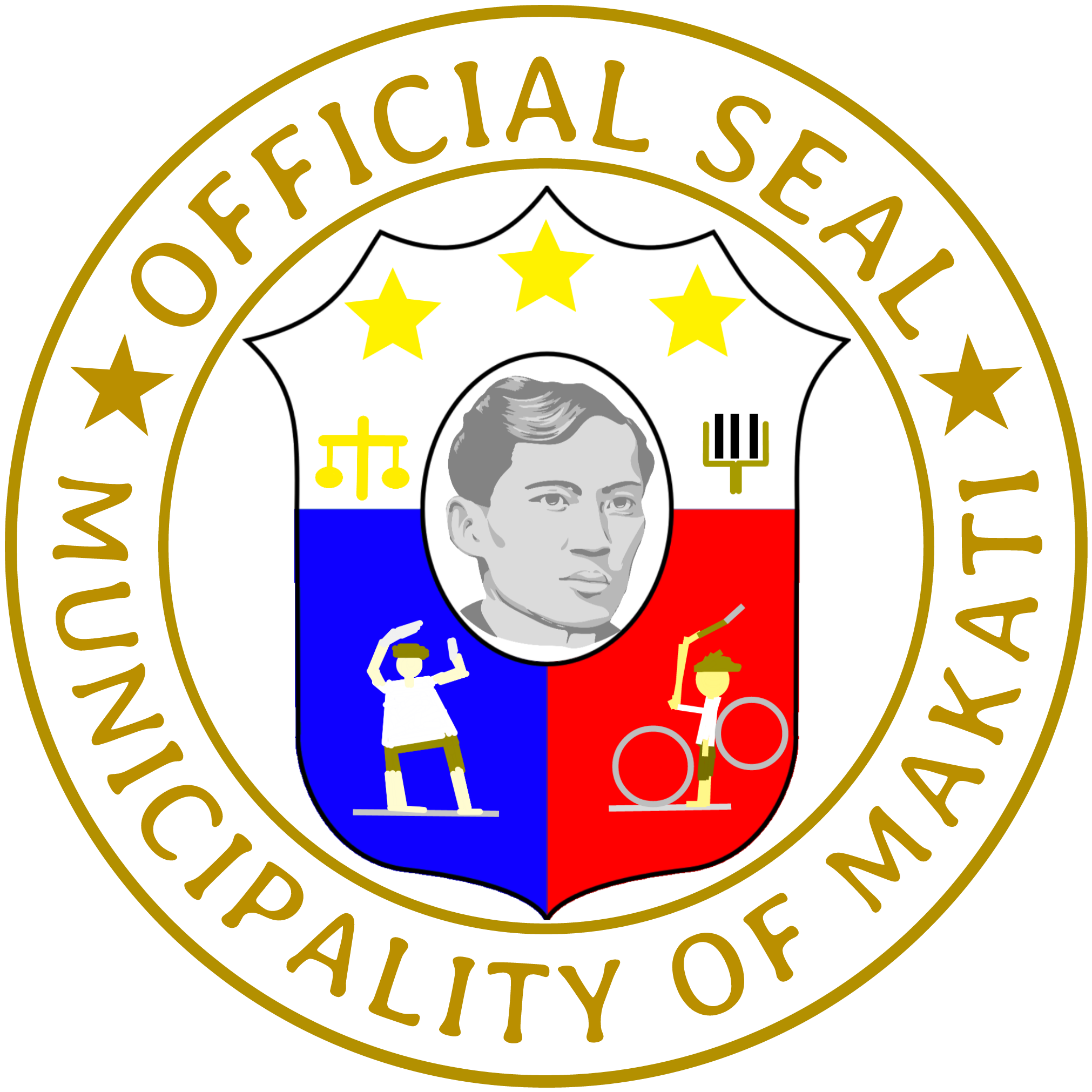
- January 18, 1988
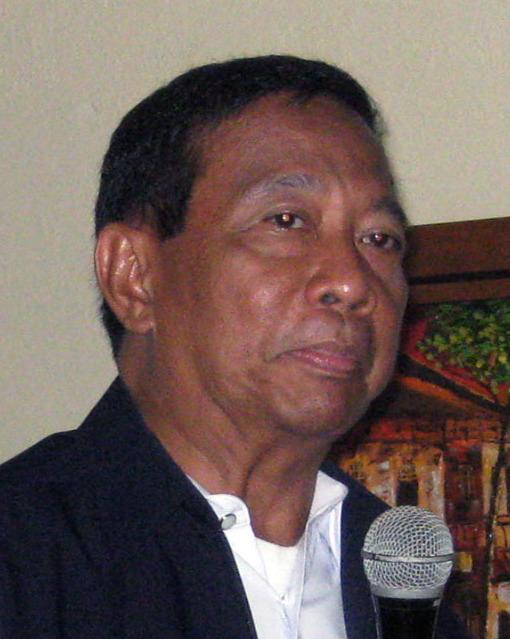

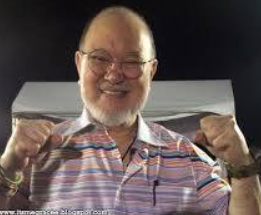

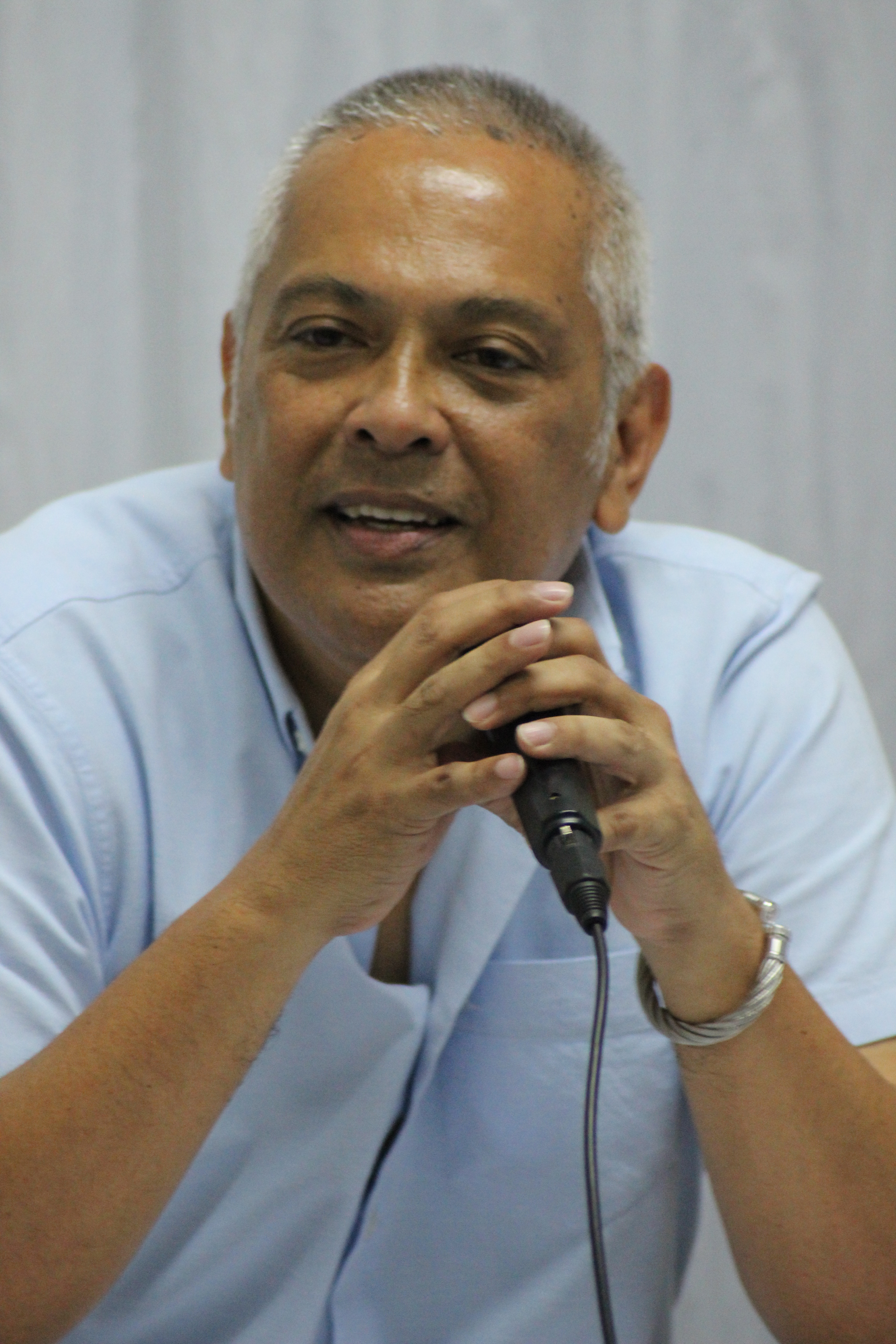

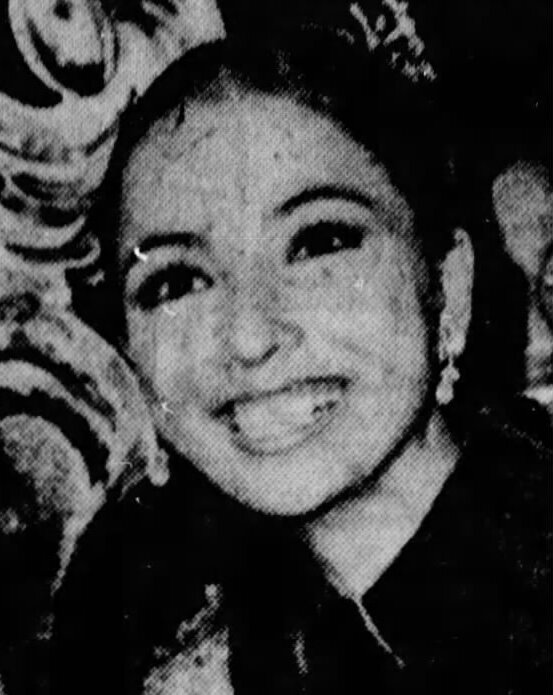

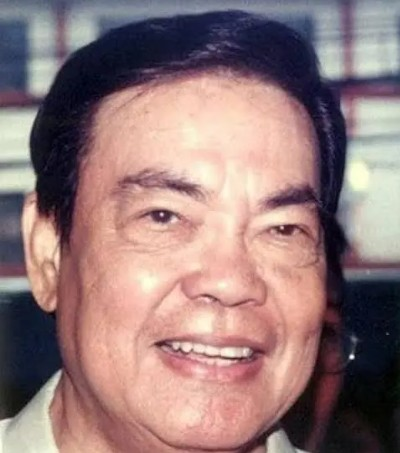

Nominee	Jejomar Binay	Augusto Syjuco Jr.	Ricardo Yabut
Party	PDP–Laban	Nacionalista	Batang Makati
Alliance	Makati Action Team	Move Makati Coalition	Batang Makati
Running mate	Conchitina Sevilla-Bernardo	Joseph Leroy Salvador	Lally Aldeguer
Popular vote	94,998	67,436	38,927
Percentage	30.97	21.98	12.69
Nominee	Aurora Pijuan	Eddie Ilarde	Aurelio Reyes Jr.
Party	Liberal	UNIDO	Nacionalista
Alliance	My Hambol Girl	Team Ilarde-Alzona	Team Reyes-Ventura
Running mate	Meynardo L. Gonzales	Cesar C. Alzona	Ernesto F. Ventura
Popular vote	31,684	28,519	22,846
Percentage	10.33	9.30	7.45
Nominee	Jose C. Luciano	Carlos P. Torres
Party	Makati Citizens Party	Independent
Alliance	Makati Citizens	Team Torres-Agustin
Running mate	Ramon L. Cannu	Antonio R. Agustin
Popular vote	15,274	7,080
Percentage	4.98	2.31
Mayor before election
Sergio Santos
Independent
Elected mayor
Jejomar Binay
PDP–Laban
- Vice mayoral election
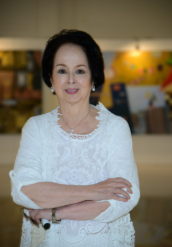

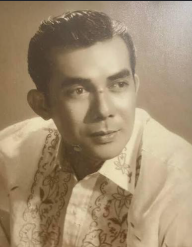

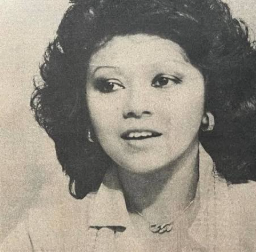

Candidate	Conchitina Sevilla-Bernardo	Joseph Leroy Salvador	Rosario "Lally" Aldeguer
Party	PDP–Laban	Liberal	Batang Makati
Alliance	Makati Action Team	Move Makati Coalition	Batang Makati
Popular vote	93,144	62,783	41,926
Percentage	30.36	20.47	13.67
Candidate	Cesar C. Alzona	Meynardo L. Gonzales	Ramon L. Cannu
Party	UNIDO	Liberal	Makati Citizens Party
Alliance	Team Ilarde-Alzona	My Hambol Girl	Makati Citizens
Popular vote	34,517	28,864	23,746
Percentage	11.25	9.41	7.74
Candidate	Ernesto F. Ventura	Antonio R. Agustin
Party	Nacionalista	Independent
Alliance	Team Reyes-Ventura	Team Torres-Agustin
Popular vote	12,938	8,846
Percentage	4.22	2.88
Vice Mayor before election
Roberto Brillante Sr.
Independent
Elected Vice Mayor
Conchitina Sevilla-Bernardo
PDP–Laban

Local elections was held in the Municipality of Makati on January 18, 1988, within the 1988 Philippine local election. The voters elected for the elective local posts in the town: the mayor, vice mayor, and the 12-member local municipal council. This was the last election in which the elections for the national and local positions were not conducted simultaneously, as the national elections (including Makati's lone district were held almost a year prior, on May 11, 1987).

== Background ==
PDP–Laban's candidate Jejomar Binay was first appointed as OIC Mayor of the Municipality of Makati by President Corazon Aquino on February 27, 1986, two days after the conclusion of the 1986 People Power Revolution which ended the 21-year rule of then president Ferdinand Marcos. Binay replaced the late former mayor Nemesio Yabut, who died on the same day as the conclusion of the 1986 revolution. Binay served as mayor until December 1, 1987, as President Aquino mandated all appointed local officials to resign should they desire to run for reelection or for other local positions in the upcoming January 1988 local election. Aquino then appointed Sergio Santos as the OIC Municipal Mayor of Makati, to replace Binay.

Binay's challengers for mayor include: Augusto Syjuco Jr. of the Nacionalista Party-Rodriguez Wing, Ricky Yabut of the Batang Makati Party (Ricky is the eldest son of the late former mayor Nemesio Yabut), former beauty queen Aurora Pijuan of the Liberal Party-Kalaw Wing, former senator Eddie Ilarde from the United Nationalist Democratic Organization, former Makati mayor Jose Luciano (Makati Citizens Party), businessman Relly Reyes of the Nacionalista Party-Laurel Wing, and independent candidate Carlos Torres.

== Candidates ==
=== Makati Action Team ===
Partido Demokratiko Pilipino-Lakas ng Bayan/Lakas ng Bansa/Makati Action Team
Name	Party
For Mayor
Jejomar "Jojo" C. Binay	PDP–Laban
For Vice Mayor
Conchitina Sevilla-Bernardo	PDP–Laban
For Councilor
Ricardo M. Alindayu	PDP–Laban
Rosalinda L. Bondal	PDP–Laban
Alex B. Carlos	Independent
Ferdinand "Ferdie" V. Estrella	PDP–Laban
Pacifico H. Gonzales	PDP–Laban
Raul "Oloy" S. Javier	PDP–Laban
Michael "Mike" M. Joseph	PDP–Laban
Napoleon "Nap" M. Malimas	PDP–Laban
Elsa V. Payumo	PDP–Laban
Pacifico "Paco" R. Reyes	PDP–Laban
Armando C. San Miguel Sr.	PDP–Laban
Antonio D. Sinchioco	Independent

=== Move Makati Coalition ===
Nacionalista Party-Rodriguez Wing/Liberal Party-Salonga Wing/Christian Social Democratic Party/Move Makati Coalition
Name	Party
For Mayor
Augusto "Boboy" L. Syjuco Jr.	Nacionalista-Rodriguez Wing
For Vice Mayor
Joseph Leroy R. Salvador	Liberal-Salonga Wing
For Councilor
Cecilio A. Acasio	PDP–Laban
Jose S. Alamis	Nacionalista-Rodriguez Wing
Roberto "Bobby" G. Brillante Sr.	Christian Social Democratic Party (Philippines)
Anastacio "Jun" de Vera Jr.	Nacionalista-Rodriguez Wing
Jay Fideli A. Francisco	Nacionalista-Rodriguez Wing
Joven Loque	Nacionalista-Rodriguez Wing
Elena B. Maccay	Liberal-Salonga Wing
Antonio "Tony" G. Manalili	Nacionalista-Rodriguez Wing
Ricardo "Ric Nepo" C. Nepomuceno	Nacionalista-Rodriguez Wing
Augusto "Chiquito" V. Pangan Sr.	Independent
Elias "Boy" V. Tolentino Jr.	Nacionalista-Rodriguez Wing
Johnny S. Wilson	Liberal-Salonga Wing

=== Team Batang Makati ===
Batang Makati Party/Kilusang Bagong Lipunan/Team Batang Makati
Name	Party
For Mayor
Ricardo "Ricky" S. Yabut	Batang Makati
For Vice Mayor
Rosario "Lally" Aldeguer	Batang Makati
For Councilor
Juan D. Alde	Batang Makati
Joselito S. Alzona	Batang Makati
Benjamin "Ben" M. Arcayena	Batang Makati
Benjamin R. Corpuz	Batang Makati
Carlito G. Halili	Batang Makati
Vicente "Vic" P. Renia	Batang Makati
Pedro M. Sacro	Batang Makati
Arcangel S. San Juan	Batang Makati
Ernesto C. Suva	Batang Makati
Severino L. Umandap	Batang Makati
Alexander "Alex" J. Villalon	KBL
Jose B. Villena III	Batang Makati

=== Team My Hambol Girl ===
Liberal Party-Kalaw Wing/Partido Demokratiko Sosyalista ng Pilipinas/Team My Hambol Girl
Name	Party
For Mayor
Aurora "Au" Pijuan	Liberal-Kalaw Wing
For Vice Mayor
Meynardo L. Gonzales	Liberal-Kalaw Wing
For Councilor
Frine B. Alarilla	Liberal-Kalaw Wing
Roberto "Obet" O. Balderas	Liberal-Kalaw Wing
Ephraim C. Genuino	Liberal-Kalaw Wing
Domingo M. Hilario	Liberal-Kalaw Wing
Oscar "Oca" M. Ibay	Liberal-Kalaw Wing
Orlando C. Lampa	PDSP
Miguel C. Lopez Jr	Liberal-Kalaw Wing
Eugenio C. Macababayao Jr.	Liberal-Kalaw Wing
Remismundo "Rem" D. Maglasang	Liberal-Kalaw Wing
Cecile K. O'Brien	Liberal-Kalaw Wing
Romeo S. Rodriguez	Liberal-Kalaw Wing
Pedro "Pete" Yabut Jr	Liberal-Kalaw Wing

=== Team Ilarde-Alzona ===
United Nationalist Democratic Organization/Takbo ng Bayan/Team Ilarde-Alzona
Name	Party
For Mayor
Edgar "Eddie" U. Ilarde	UNIDO
For Vice Mayor
Cesar C. Alzona	UNIDO
For Councilor
Vicente "Vic" S. Aceveda	UNIDO
Eduardo "Atty.Ed" O. Causapin	UNIDO
Absalon G. Golpeo	UNIDO
Bernardo "Bernie" T. Gonzaga Jr	UNIDO
Federico "Jun" Mariano Jr	UNIDO
Romeo T. Moran	UNIDO
Aquilino "Mel" G. Oreta	UNIDO
Jose Roberto "Jobert" Sermonia	UNIDO
Sofronio C. Untalan Jr.	UNIDO
Jose Artie U. Vergel de Dios	Takbo ng Bayan
Rodolfo "Rudy" B. Villanueva	UNIDO
Federico Ma. Zulueta	UNIDO

=== Makati Citizens Alliance ===
Makati Citizens Party/Makati Citizens Alliance
Name	Party
For Mayor
Jose C. Luciano	Makati Citizens Party
For Vice Mayor
Ramon L. Cannu	Makati Citizens Party
For Councilor
Cesar S. Abad	Makati Citizens Party
Douglas B. Austria	Liberal
Paciano B. Balita	Liberal
Virgilio "Jun Soler" G. Calimbahin Jr.	Makati Citizens Party
Manuel "Maning" A. Flores	Makati Citizens Party
Susan S. Gervasio	Makati Citizens Party
Rolando "Rolly" G. Orca	Makati Citizens Party
Pedro "Pete" N. Patag	Makati Citizens Party
Jose C. Santos	Makati Citizens Party
Filemon N. Sarono	Makati Citizens Party
Rodolfo "Rudy" F. Sese	Makati Citizens Party
Bartolome "Bart" O. Sinocruz Sr.	Makati Citizens Party

=== Team Reyes-Ventura ===
Nacionalista Party-Laurel Wing/Partido Demokratiko Pilipino-Lakas ng Bayan/Party of the Urban Poor/Team Reyes-Ventura
Name	Party
For Mayor
Aurelio "Relly" H. Reyes Jr.	Nacionalista-Laurel Wing
For Vice Mayor
Ernesto F. Ventura	PDP–Laban
For Councilor
Lucas B. Agito	Nacionalista-Laurel Wing
Ramon A. Albar	Nacionalista-Laurel Wing
Eduardo J. Aquino	Nacionalista-Laurel Wing
Gaudencio Blancaflor Jr.	Party of Urban Poor
Filemon F. Flores	Nacionalista-Laurel Wing
Alberto B. Gualberto	Nacionalista-Laurel Wing
Felimon A. Mabborang Sr.	Nacionalista-Laurel Wing
Julius A. Obregon	Nacionalista-Laurel Wing
Roque Edgardo M. Paredes	Nacionalista-Laurel Wing
Domina R. Quisquis	Nacionalista-Laurel Wing
Nazario B. Regino	Nacionalista-Laurel Wing
Eduardo V. Umali	Nacionalista-Laurel Wing

=== Team Torres-Agustin ===
Independent/Team Torres-Agustin
Name	Party
For Mayor
Carlos P. Torres	Independent
For Vice Mayor
Antonio R. Agustin	Independent
For Councilor
Rodolfo S. Aguinaldo	Independent
Renato C. Aquino	Independent
Juanito A. Ballano Jr.	Independent
Laureto B. Canonizado	Independent
Villamor B. Castillo	Independent
Louwell A. Cerdeña	Independent
Pedro P. Dadula	Independent
Napoleon J. delos Santos	Independent
Leoncio C. Enciso	Independent
Ricardo V. Francisco	Independent
Abelardo G. Yabut Jr.	Independent
Miguel T. Yabut Sr.	Independent

=== Team NUCD ===
Lakas-CMD (1991)/Team NUCD
For Councilor
Michael H. Sta. Juana	Lakas
Fidel V. San Pedro	Lakas

=== Partido ng Bayan ===
For Councilor
Mischa Nicanor "Nic" B. Elman	PnB
George B. Gaduang	PnB

=== Makati Unified Liberal Party ===
For Councilor
Eliseo B. Baldeviso	Liberal
Fe E. delos Santos	Liberal
Willito M. Romero	Makati Unified Liberal Party
Leopoldo Sanchez	Liberal
Felipe A. Suzara	Liberal

=== Other Non-Independent Candidates ===
For Councilor
Faustino Y. Bautista	PDP–Laban
Angel M. Gutierrez Jr	Friends of Makati
Emilio B. Vibal	KBL
Francisco A. Alvia	Makati Citizens
Paulino H. Asuncion Jr	Makati Citizens
Filonin A. Baclig	Makati Citizens

=== Independent Candidates ===
For Councilor
Ordulla C. Gealogo	Independent
Manuel A. Pelaez	Independent

== Results ==
=== Mayor ===
Former OIC Mayor Jejomar Binay won against seven other mayoralty contenders.

1988 Makati mayoral election
Candidate	Party	Votes	%
Jejomar Binay	PDP–Laban	94,998	30.97
Augusto Syjuco Jr.	Nacionalista Party (Rodriguez wing)	67,436	21.98
Ricardo "Ricky" Yabut	Batang Makati Party	38,927	12.69
Aurora Pijuan	Liberal Party (Kalaw wing)	31,684	10.33
Eddie Ilarde	United Nationalist Democratic Organization	28,519	9.30
Aurelio "Relly" Reyes Jr.	Nacionalista Party (Laurel wing)	22,846	7.45
Jose C. Luciano	Makati Citizens Party	15,274	4.98
Carlos Torres	Independent	7,080	2.31
Total		306,764	100.00
PDP–Laban gain from Independent			

=== Vice Mayor ===
Conchitina Sevilla-Bernardo won against seven other candidates.

1988 Makati vice mayoral election
Candidate	Party	Votes	%
Conchitina Sevilla-Bernardo	PDP–Laban	93,144	30.36
Joseph Leroy Salvador	Liberal Party (Salonga wing)	62,783	20.47
Rosario "Lally" Aldeguer	Batang Makati Party	41,926	13.67
Cesar Alzona	United Nationalist Democratic Organization	34,517	11.25
Meynardo Gonzales	Liberal Party (Kalaw wing)	28,864	9.41
Ramon Cannu	Makati Citizens Party	23,746	7.74
Ernesto Ventura	Nacionalista Party (Laurel wing)	12,938	4.22
Antonio Agustin	Independent	8,846	2.88
Total		306,764	100.00
PDP–Laban gain from Independent			

=== Lone District Representative ===
Baby Puyat-Reyes won as Makati's lone district representative against 15 other contenders. The election for this position was held on May 11, 1987.

1987 Makati's lone district representative election
Candidate	Party	Votes	%
Baby Puyat-Reyes	PDP–Laban	69,994	43.95
Augusto Syjuco Jr.	Nacionalista Party	60,675	38.10
Jose Maria "Joey" Rufino	National Union of Christian Democrats	28,586	17.95
Roberto "Bobby" Brillante Sr.	Christian Social Democratic Party (Philippines)		
Oscar "Oca" Ibay	Liberal Party		
Ernesto Ventura	PDP–Laban		
Felimon Flores	United Nationalist Democratic Organization		
Gaudencio Blancaflor	Nacionalista Party		
Sofronio Untalan Jr.	Liberal Party		
Alexander "Alex" Villalon	Kilusang Bagong Lipunan		
Jose Artie Vergel de Dios	Takbo ng Bayan		
Tomas Baluyot	PDP–Laban		
Adrian Ocampo	PDP–Laban		
Samuel Matias Gazan	Independent		
Richard Francisco	Independent		
Total		159,255	100.00
PDP–Laban gain from Kilusang Bagong Lipunan			

=== Municipal Council ===
Six out of twelve winning candidates came from Binay's Lakas-PDP–Laban Coalition, while the other six came from Boboy Syjuco's Move Makati Coalition.

Municipal Council election at Makati's lone district
Party	Candidate	Votes	%
Independent	Augusto "Chiquito" V. Pangan Sr.	142,605	
Liberal	Johnny S. Wilson	119,422	
Christian Social Democratic Party (Philippines)	Roberto "Bobby" G. Brillante Sr.	91,815	
Liberal	Elena B. Maccay	83,478	
PDP–Laban	Rosalinda L. Bondal	80,418	
PDP–Laban	Elsa V. Payumo	78,553	
PDP–Laban	Michael "Mike" M. Joseph	69,841	
Nacionalista	Elias "Boy" V. Tolentino Jr.	68,916	
PDP–Laban	Ferdinand "Ferdie" V. Estrella	63,852	
PDP–Laban	Raul "Oloy" S. Javier	58,376	
PDP–Laban	Pacifico "Paco" R. Reyes	56,857	
Nacionalista	Antonio "Tony" G. Manalili	53,418	
PDP–Laban	Armando C. San Miguel Sr.	51,986	
Nacionalista	Jose S. Alamis	50,843	
Independent	Alex B. Carlos	49,977	
PDP–Laban	Pacifico H. Gonzales	49,211	
Liberal	Oscar "Oca" M. Ibay	48,365	
Liberal	Cecile K. O'Brien	47,792	
Independent	Antonio D. Sinchioco	47,084	
Independent	Miguel T. Yabut Sr.	46,381	
Nacionalista	Lucas B. Agito	45,864	
PDP–Laban	Napoleon "Nap" M. Malimas	45,207	
Makati Citizens Party	Virgilio "Jun Soler" G. Calimbahin Jr.	44,618	
Independent	Roberto C. Balderas	43,991	
UNIDO	Eduardo "Atty. Ed" O. Causapin	43,576	
Nacionalista	Ramon A. Albar	42,948	
Batang Makati	Joselito S. Alzona	42,505	
PDP–Laban	Ricardo M. Alindayu	41,966	
Liberal	Efraim C. Genuino	41,421	
Liberal	Paciano B. Balita	40,958	
UNIDO	Rodolfo "Rudy" B. Villanueva	40,502	
Nacionalista	Eduardo "Eddie" J. Aquino	39,971	
Batang Makati	Benjamin "Ben" M. Arcayena	39,523	
UNIDO	Vicente "Vic" S. Aceveda	39,084	
PDP–Laban	Cecilio A. Acasio	38,646	
Liberal	Pedro R. Yabut Jr.	38,219	
Liberal	Douglas B. Austria	37,805	
UNIDO	Bernardo "Bernie" T. Gonzaga Jr.	37,344	
Nacionalista	Amado "Jun" C. de Vera Jr.	36,921	
Batang Makati	Benjamin R. Corpuz	36,485	
Liberal	Frine B. Alarilla	36,072	
Makati Citizens Party	Manuel "Maning" A. Flores	35,618	
UNIDO	Federico "Jun" Mariano Jr.	35,207	
Nacionalista	Jay Fideli A. Francisco	34,774	
Batang Makati	Jose B. Villena III	34,396	
PDSP	Orlando C. Lampa	33,948	
Makati Citizens Party	Susan S. Gervasio	33,512	
UNIDO	Romeo T. Moran	33,091	
Nacionalista	Venancio "Ven" L. Loque	32,673	
Batang Makati	Vicente "Vic" P. Renia	32,248	
Liberal	Miguel C. Lopez Jr.	31,832	
Makati Citizens Party	Rolando "Rolly" G. Orca	31,427	
UNIDO	Aquilino "Mel" G. Oreta	31,019	
Nacionalista	Ricardo "Ric Nepo" C. Nepomuceno	30,588	
Batang Makati	Pedro M. Sacro	30,143	
Independent	Abelardo G. Yabut Jr.	29,756	
Makati Citizens Party	Pedro "Pete" N. Patag	29,361	
UNIDO	Jose Roberto "Jobert" Sermonia	28,973	
Liberal	Remismundo "Rem" D. Maglasang	28,112	
Makati Citizens Party	Jose C. Santos	27,685	
UNIDO	Sofronio C. Untalan Jr.	27,281	
Nacionalista	Filemon F. Flores	26,903	
Batang Makati	Ernesto C. Suva	26,514	
Makati Citizens Party	Cesar S. Abad	26,097	
Makati Citizens Party	Filemon N. Sarono	25,674	
Takbo ng Bayan	Jose Artie U. Vergel de Dios	25,248	
Nacionalista	Alberto B. Gualberto	24,891	
Batang Makati	Severino L. Umandap	24,467	
Liberal	Romeo S. Rodriguez	24,061	
Makati Citizens Party	Rodolfo "Rudy" F. Sese	23,679	
UNIDO	Absalon G. Golpeo	23,252	
Batang Makati	Juan D. Alde	22,904	
KBL	Alexander "Alex" J. Villalon	22,531	
Batang Makati	Carlito G. Halili	22,108	
Liberal	Domingo M. Hilario	21,684	
Makati Citizens Party	Bartolome O. Sinocruz Sr.	21,261	
UNIDO	Federico Ma. Zulueta	20,873	
Nacionalista	Felimon A. Mabborang Sr.	20,468	
Lakas	Fidel V. San Pedro	20,097	
Lakas	Michael P. Sta. Juana	19,874	
PnB	Mischa Nicanor "Nick" B. Elman	19,638	
PnB	George B. Gaduang	19,217	
LABAN	Eliseo B. Baldeviso	18,946	
Nacionalista	Roque Edgardo M. Paredes	18,731	
Liberal	Fe E. delos Santos	18,493	
Nacionalista	Julius Obregon	18,214	
Liberal	Willito M. Romero	17,978	
Nacionalista	Nazario B. Regino	17,744	
Liberal	Leopoldo Sanchez	17,521	
Nacionalista	Eduardo V. Umali	17,284	
Liberal	Felipe A. Suzara	17,063	
PDP–Laban	Faustino Y. Bautista	16,841	
Friends of Makati	Angel M. Gutierrez Jr.	16,597	
KBL	Emilio B. Vibal	16,331	
Makati Citizens Party	Francisco A. Alvia	16,074	
Nacionalista	Domina R. Quisquis	15,862	
Liberal	Eugenio C. Macababayao Jr.	15,618	
Makati Citizens Party	Filonin A. Baclig	15,374	
Party of the Urban Poor	Gaudencio Blancaflor Jr.	15,137	
Independent	Rodolfo S. Aguinaldo	14,892	
Makati Citizens Party	Paulino H. Asuncion Jr.	14,631	
Independent	Renato C. Aquino	14,387	
Independent	Juanito A. Ballano Jr.	14,122	
Independent	Laureto B. Canonizado	13,864	
Independent	Villamor B. Castillo	13,541	
Independent	Louwell A. Cerdeña	13,203	
Independent	Pedro P. Dadula	12,874	
Independent	Napoleon J. delos Santos	12,486	
Independent	Leoncio C. Enciso	12,071	
Independent	Ricardo V. Francisco	11,648	
Independent	Manuel A. Pelaez	11,217	
Independent	Ordulla C. Gealogo	10,793	
