= 1980 Makati local elections =

Local elections in the Philippines

1980 Makati mayoral election
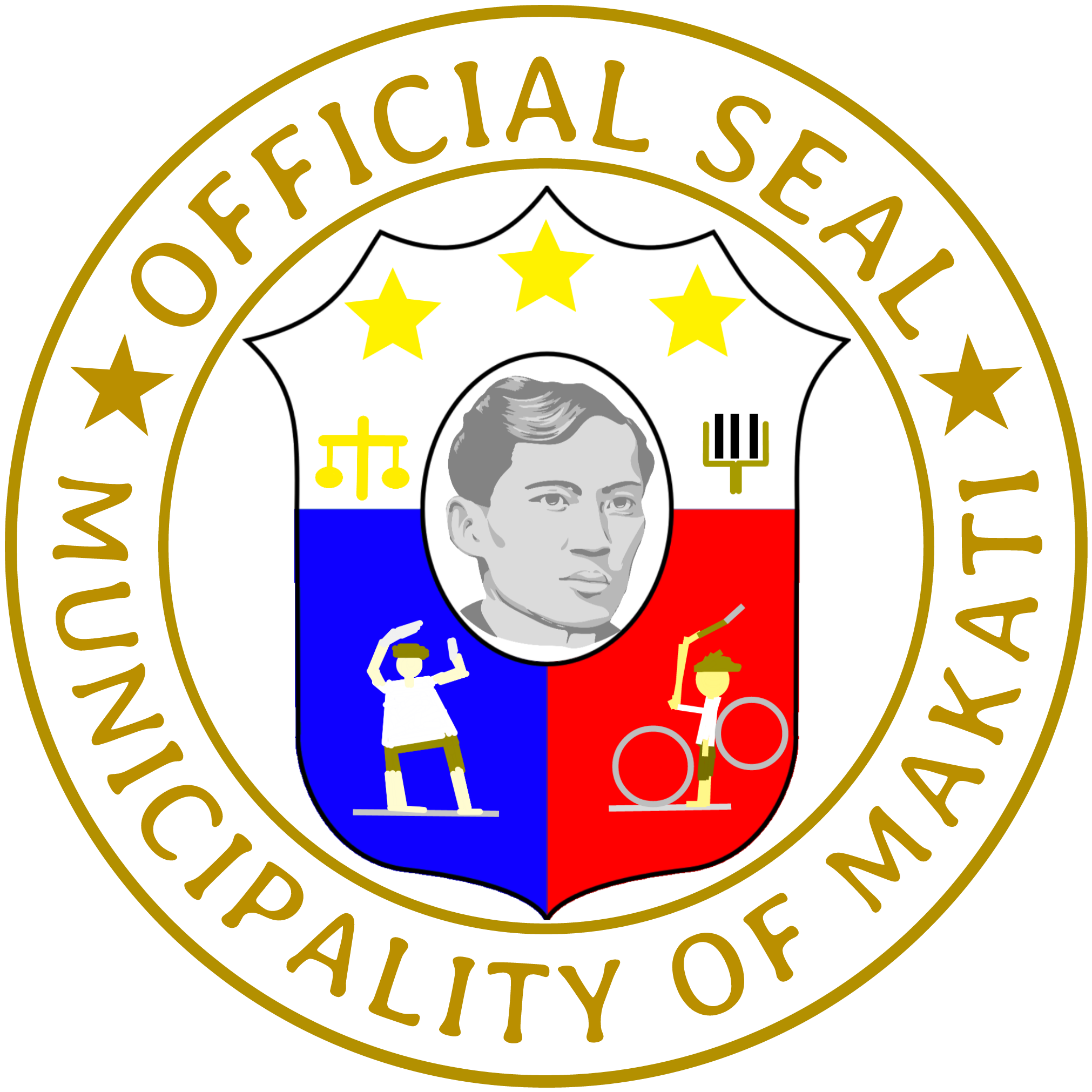
- January 30, 1980
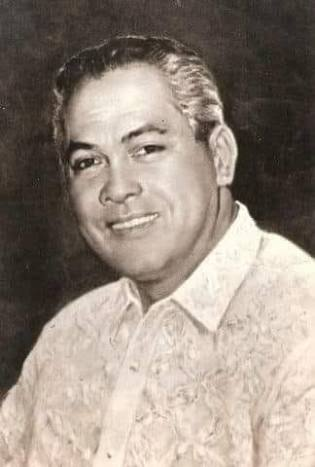

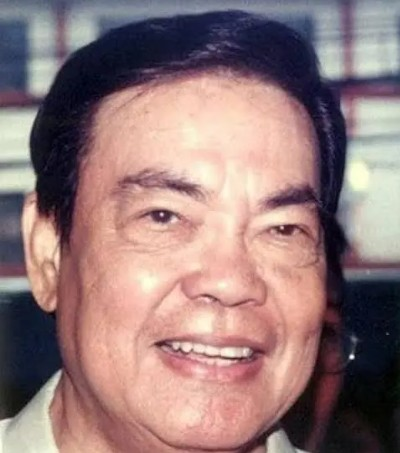
Nominee	Nemesio Yabut	Alexander Villalon	Eddie Ilarde
Party	KBL	National Union for Liberation	KBL
Alliance	KBL	National Union for Liberation
Running mate	Johnny S. Wilson	Ernesto F. Ventura
Popular vote	194,471	17,163	15,004
Percentage	85.81	7.57	6.62
Mayor before election
Nemesio I. Yabut Sr.
Liberal
Elected mayor
Nemesio I. Yabut Sr.
KBL
- Vice mayoral election
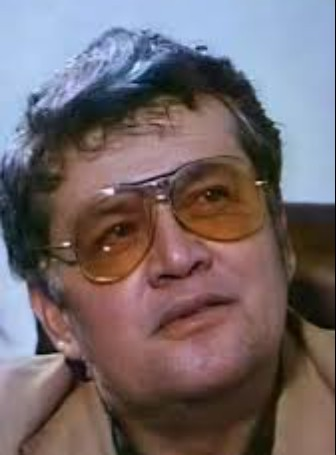
Candidate	Johnny Wilson	Ernesto F. Ventura
Party	KBL	National Union for Liberation
Alliance	KBL	National Union for Liberation
Popular vote	189,494	6,492
Percentage	96.69	3.31
Vice Mayor before election
Johnny S. Wilson
Liberal
Elected Vice Mayor
Johnny S. Wilson
KBL

Local elections was held in the Municipality of Makati on January 30, 1980, within the 1980 Philippine local elections, during the Philippine Martial Law years of the administration of President Ferdinand Marcos. The voters elected for the elective local posts in the town: the mayor, vice mayor, and the eight-member local municipal council. This was the first election under Martial Law. The elections for the national and local positions were not conducted simultaneously, as the national elections (including Makati's lone district) were held in 1978, and later, in 1984.

== Background ==
KBL's candidate, Nemesio "Mesio" I. Yabut Sr. was the incumbent municipal mayor of Makati, having been elected in 1971, where he defeated then incumbent mayor Jose C. Luciano. He then became closely allied with President Marcos and later defected from the Liberal Party and joined the newly-formed Kilusang Bagong Lipunan political party founded by the president. The municipality of Makati was then under the jurisdiction of the 1st congressional district of the Province of Rizal until 1975, when Metro Manila was formed, and Makati was included therein.

Yabut's challengers for mayor were Alexander Villalon of the National Union for Liberation (NUL) and Region IV Assemblyman Edgar "Eddie" Ilarde. At the time, main opposition groups like the Liberal Party, Lakas ng Bayan, had little to no participation in the 1980 Philippine local elections. As such, they weren't able to field candidates in most local positions up for election.

== Results ==
=== Mayor ===
Incumbent mayor Nemesio Yabut won against Alexander Villalon and incumbent assemblyman Eddie Ilarde in a landslide.

1980 Makati mayoral election
Candidate	Party	Votes	%
Nemesio Yabut	Kilusang Bagong Lipunan	194,471	85.81
Alexander "Alex" Villalon	National Union for Liberation	17,163	7.57
Eddie Ilarde	Kilusang Bagong Lipunan	15,004	6.62
Total		226,638	100.00
KBL gain from Liberal			
Source: Commission on Elections

=== Vice Mayor ===
Actor and incumbent Vice Mayor Johnny Wilson won against NUL's Ernesto Ventura.

1980 Makati vice mayoral election
Candidate	Party	Votes	%
Johnny S. Wilson	Kilusang Bagong Lipunan	189,494	96.69
Ernesto Ventura	National Union for Liberation	6,492	3.31
Total		195,986	100.00
KBL gain from Liberal			
Source: Commission on Elections

=== Municipal Council ===
All eight Makati municipal council positions were won by KBL candidates.

Municipal Council election at Makati's lone district
Party	Candidate	Votes	%
KBL	Augusto "Chiquito" V. Pangan Sr.		
KBL	Joseph Leroy R. Salvador		
KBL	Roberto "Bobby" G. Brillante Sr.		
KBL	Tomas A. Baluyut		
KBL	Dolores M. Rivera		
KBL	Michael M. Joseph		
KBL	Elena B. Maccay		
KBL	Ruperto Gaite		

Source: Commission on Elections

=== Aftermath ===
Mayor Nemesio Yabut will serve as municipal mayor until his death on February 25, 1986, which coincided with the last day of 1986 People Power Revolution, which ousted President Ferdinand Marcos, Mayor Yabut's patron, from power. President Corazon Aquino, who replaced Marcos, appointed lawyer Jejomar Binay as OIC Mayor of Makati two days after Yabut's death, on February 27, 1986. Some of Yabut's relatives also entered politics, such as his sons Ricardo "Ricky", who ran for Makati Mayor twice, in 1988 and in 2019; Nemesio "King" Yabut Jr., who became Makati 2nd district councilor; and Nemesio Arturo "Toro' Yabut III (who became Vice Mayor of Makati).
