= 1995 Makati local elections =

1st city elections in Makati

1995 Makati mayoral election
- May 8, 1995
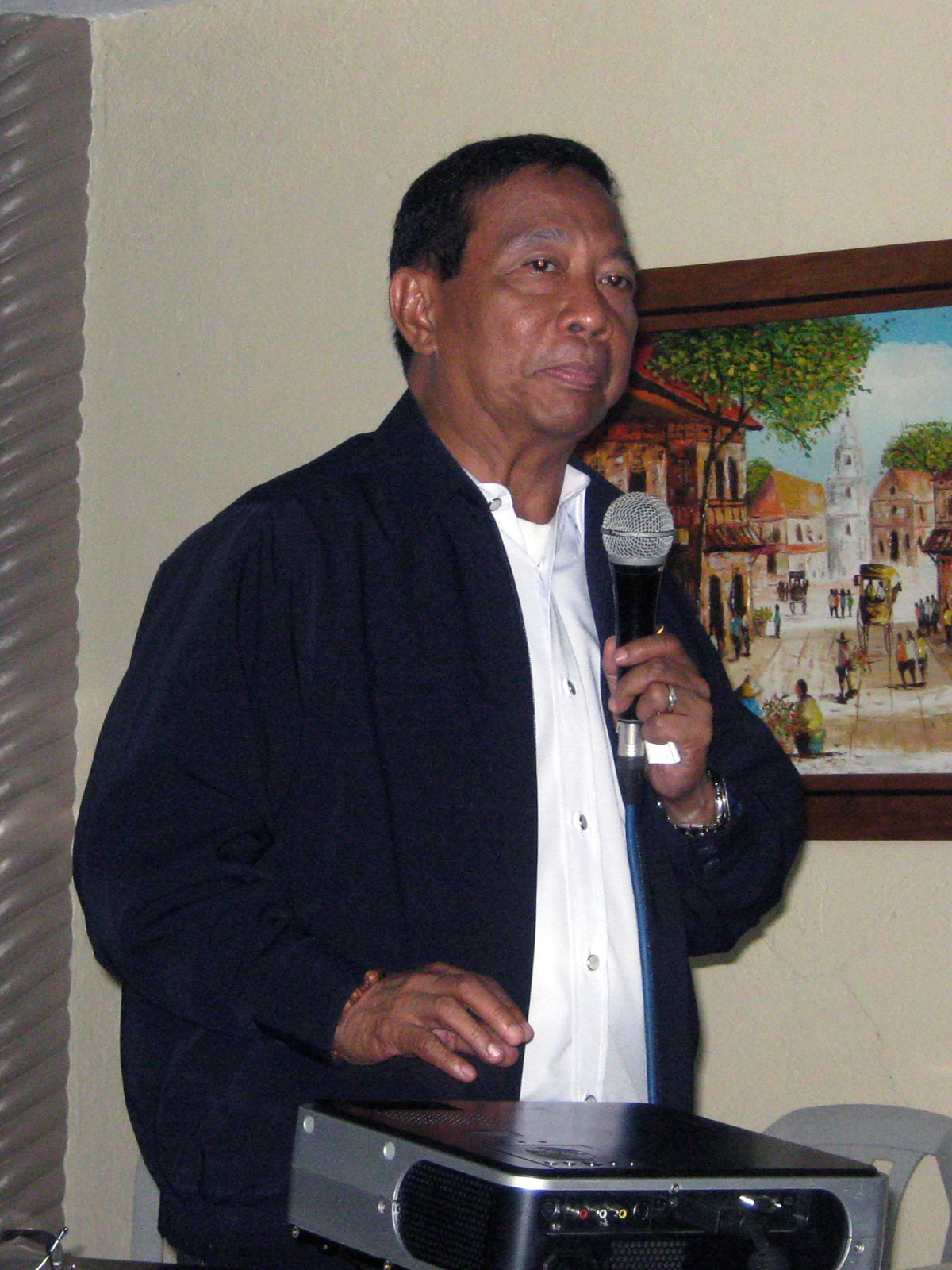

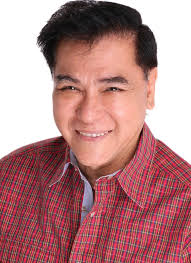
Nominee	Jejomar Binay	Bobby Brillante	Reynaldo Perez
Party	PDP–Laban	Lakas	Independent
Alliance	Matapat na Pangkat	MALAKAS Makati
Running mate	Arturo "Toro" Yabut	Nenita Licaros
Popular vote	124,168	44,241	1,141
Percentage	73.23	26.09	0.67
Mayor before election
Jejomar Binay
PDP–Laban
Elected mayor
Jejomar Binay
PDP–Laban
- Vice mayoral election
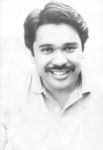

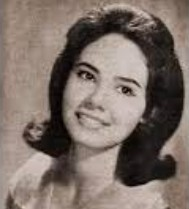
Candidate	Arturo "Toro" Yabut	Nenita Licaros
Party	LDP	Lakas
Alliance	Matapat na Pangkat	MALAKAS Makati
Popular vote	107,679	62,348
Percentage	63.33	36.67
Vice Mayor before election
Nemesio Arturo "Toro" S. Yabut III
KBL
Elected Vice Mayor
Nemesio Arturo "Toro" S. Yabut III
LDP

Local elections was held in the City of Makati on May 8, 1995, within the Philippine general election. The voters elected for the elective local posts in the city: the mayor, vice mayor, the two congressmen for the newly-created 1st and 2nd legislative districts, and the councilors, eight in each of the city's two legislative districts. This was the first election after Makati became a chartered city on January 2, 1995.

== Background ==
Incumbent mayor and PDP–Laban stalwart Jejomar Binay ran for a third and final term after being elected in 1988 and 1992. He selected incumbent vice-mayor (and former political enemy) Nemesio Arturo "Toro" Yabut as his running-mate.

Binay's challengers were former city councilor Roberto "Bobby" Brillante Sr. of Lakas-NUCD, and independent candidate Reynaldo Perez.

For the vice-mayoralty, Yabut faced former beauty queen and incumbent 2nd district councilor Nenita Licaros.

== Candidates ==
=== Matapat na Pangkat (Makati Coalition) ===
PDP–Laban/Liberal Party/Laban ng Demokratikong Pilipino/Matapat na Pangkat
Name	Party
For Mayor
Jejomar "Jojo" C. Binay	PDP–Laban
For Vice Mayor
Nemesio Arturo "Toro" S. Yabut III	LDP
For House Of Representative (1st District)
Ceferino "Joker" P. Arroyo Jr.	Independent
For Councilor (1st District)
Oscar M. Ibay	PDP–Laban
Raul "Oloy" S. Javier	PDP–Laban
Ferdinand Jacinto "Ferdie Tangol" T. Eusebio	PDP–Laban
Meynardo L. Gonzales	Independent
Gabriel "Bong" V. Daza III	LDP
Rosalinda L. Bondal	PDP–Laban
Michael M. Joseph	PDP–Laban
Ferdinand V. Estrella	Liberal
For House Of Representative (2nd District)
Agapito "Butz" A. Aquino	LDP
For Councilor (2nd District)
Johnny S. Wilson	PDP–Laban
Pedro A. Ibay	PDP–Laban
Salvador "Buddy" D. Pangilinan	PDP–Laban
Ernesto "Nestor" S. Mercado	PDP–Laban
Antonio "Tony" G. Manalili	LDP
Elias "Boy" V. Tolentino	LDP
Astolfo C. Pimentel	PDP–Laban
Divina "Divine" A. Jacome	PDP–Laban

=== MALAKAS Makati ===
Lakas-NUCD/MALAKAS Makati
Name	Party
For Mayor
Roberto "Bobby" G. Brillante Sr.	Lakas
For Vice Mayor
Nenita R. Licaros	Lakas
For House Of Representative (1st District)
Maria Consuelo "Baby" Puyat-Reyes	Lakas
For Councilor (1st District)
Elsa V. Payumo	Lakas
Melvin Kirk J. Yabut Jr.	Lakas
Violeta L. Chua	Lakas
Alexander J. Villalon	Lakas
Virgilio S. Javier	Lakas
Pedro P. Dadula	Lakas
Amado G. de Vera III	Lakas
Filemon N. Sarono	Lakas
Felicisimo P. Bascon Jr.	Lakas
For House Of Representative (2nd District)
Augusto "Boboy" L. Syjuco Jr.	Lakas
For Councilor (2nd District)
Elena B. Maccay	Lakas
AnaLuz "Atty. Luz" B. Cristal-Tenorio	Lakas
Virgilio Y. Baluyut	Lakas
Aristotle "Jotle" B. Viray	Lakas
Ricardo "Ric Nepo" C. Nepomuceno	Lakas
Conrado D. Sinchioco	Lakas
Melquiades B. Agustin	Lakas
Raymundo J. Eleazar	Lakas

Independent Candidates
Name	Party
For Mayor
Reynaldo O. Perez	Independent
For Councilor (1st District)
Augusto "Chiquito" V. Pangan Sr.	Independent
Rodolfo S. de Leon	Independent
Perfecto "Bambi" M. Santos	Independent
Nicolas B. Bertuman	Independent
For House Of Representative (2nd District)
Billy Bibit	Independent
Ramon C. Delloro	Independent
For Councilor (2nd District)
Gaudencio L. San Juan	Independent
Eduardo E. Recometa	Independent
Rogelio G. Bonifacio	Independent
Danilo M. Pangan	Independent
Jovencio F. Mendoza	Independent
Cesar C. Alzona	Independent
Herminia Elia G. Perez	Independent
Roy R. Ramos	Independent

=== Other Non-Independent Candidates ===
People's Reform Party
For House Of Representative (1st District)
Enerico M. Sampang	PRP

Nationalist People's Coalition
For House Of Representative (2nd District)
Nemesio "King" S. Yabut Jr.	NPC

Bicol Saro
For Councilor (2nd District)
Efren C. Neri	Bicol Saro

== Results ==
=== Mayor ===
Incumbent mayor Jejomar Binay won against former councilor Roberto "Bobby" Brillante Sr. and independent candidate Reynaldo Perez.

1995 Makati mayoral election
Candidate	Party	Votes	%
Jejomar Binay	PDP–Laban	124,168	73.23
Roberto "Bobby" Brillante Sr.	Lakas–NUCD–UMDP	44,241	26.09
Reynaldo Perez	Independent	1,141	0.67
Total		169,550	100.00
PDP–Laban hold			
Source: Commission on Elections

=== Vice Mayor ===
Incumbent Vice Mayor Arturo "Toro" Yabut won against incumbent 2nd district councilor Nenita Licaros.

1995 Makati vice mayoral election
Candidate	Party	Votes	%
Nemesio Arturo "Toro" Yabut III	Laban ng Demokratikong Pilipino	107,679	63.33
Nenita Licaros	Lakas–NUCD–UMDP	62,348	36.67
Total		170,027	100.00
Laban ng Demokratikong Pilipino gain from Kilusang Bagong Lipunan			
Source: Commission on Elections

=== Makati's 1st district representative ===
Incumbent Joker Arroyo of Laban ng Makabayang Masang Pilipino was re-elected as the representative of the newly created Makati's 1st congressional district, defeating former representative of the old Makati lone congressional district, Baby Puyat-Reyes and Enerico Sampang.

1995 Makati 1st District Representative election
Candidate	Party	Votes	%
Joker Arroyo (incumbent)	Independent	68,092	72.67
Baby Puyat-Reyes	Lakas–NUCD–UMDP	19,649	20.97
Enerico Sampang	People's Reform Party	5,961	6.36
Total		93,702	100.00
Independent hold			

=== Makati's 2nd district representative ===
Incumbent senator Butz Aquino of Laban ng Demokratikong Pilipino was elected representative of the newly created Makati's 2nd congressional district, defeating Augusto Syjuco Jr. of the Lakas–NUCD–UMDP, Nemesio Yabut Jr. of the Nationalist People's Coalition (Vice Mayor Arturo "Toro" Yabut's brother), former police colonel Billy Bibit, and independent candidate Ramon Delloro.

However, the Commission on Elections annulled Aquino's proclamation, citing lack of residency requirements. This decision was affirmed by the Supreme Court on September 18, 1995, thereby cancelling Aquino's election. The said decision also prevented COMELEC from proclaiming the second-highest placer, Syjuco, as the duly-elected representative of the second district.

1995 Makati 2nd District Representative election
Candidate	Party	Votes	%
Butz Aquino	Laban ng Demokratikong Pilipino	38,547	41.34
Augusto Syjuco Jr.	Lakas–NUCD–UMDP	35,910	38.52
Nemesio "King" Yabut Jr.	Nationalist People's Coalition	10,059	10.79
Billy Bibit	Independent	8,626	9.25
Ramon Delloro	Independent	91	0.10
Total		93,233	100.00
Election nullified			

=== City Council ===
==== 1st District ====
Seven of eight candidates of Binay-Yabut slate won the city council seats for this district. Independent candidate and actor Augusto Pangan Sr. is the lone non-Binay candidate to win in the council race.

City Council election at Makati's 1st district
Party	Candidate	Votes	%
LDP	Gabriel "Bong" V. Daza III	74,956	
PDP–Laban	Rosalinda L. Bondal	61,071	
Independent	Augusto "Chiquito" V. Pangan Sr.	59,547	
Liberal	Ferdinand V. Estrella	54,507	
PDP–Laban	Michael M. Joseph	53,540	
PDP–Laban	Raul "Oloy" S. Javier	52,560	
Independent	Meynardo L. Gonzales	51,665	
PDP–Laban	Oscar M. Ibay	51,007	
PDP–Laban	Ferdinand Jacinto "Ferdie Tangol" T. Eusebio	42,306	
Lakas	Elsa V. Payumo	40,628	
Lakas	Melvin Kirk J. Yabut Jr.	28,604	
Lakas	Violeta L. Chua	21,181	
Lakas	Alexander J. Villalon	18,895	
Lakas	Virgilio S. Javier	16,449	
Lakas	Pedro P. Dadula	13,730	
Lakas	Amado G. de Vera III	12,980	
Independent	Rodolfo S. de Leon	11,932	
Independent	Perfecto "Bambi" M. Santos	9,240	
Lakas	Filemon N. Sarono	8,792	
Lakas	Felicisimo P. Bascon Jr.	6,414	
Independent	Nicolas B. Bertumen	3,112	

==== 2nd District ====
Seven of eight candidates of Binay-Yabut slate won the city council seats for this district.

City Council election at Makati's 2nd district
Party	Candidate	Votes	%
PDP–Laban	Ernesto "Nestor" S. Mercado	63,598	
PDP–Laban	Pedro A. Ibay	57,229	
PDP–Laban	Salvador "Buddy" D. Pangilinan	55,475	
LDP	Antonio "Tony" G. Manalili	54,311	
PDP–Laban	Johnny S. Wilson	53,243	
LDP	Elias "Boy" V. Tolentino	47,594	
Lakas	Elena B. Maccay	51,665	
PDP–Laban	Astolfo C. Pimentel	42,400	
PDP–Laban	Divina "Divine" A. Jacome	34,290	
Lakas	Ana-Luz "Atty. Luz" B. Cristal-Tenorio	27,020	
Lakas	Virgilio Y. Baluyut	26,184	
Lakas	Aristotle "Jotle" B. Viray	21,582	
Lakas	Ricardo "Ric Nepo" C. Nepomuceno	18,613	
Lakas	Conrado D. Sinchioco	16,026	
Lakas	Melquiades B. Agustin	14,989	
Lakas	Raymundo J. Eleazar	14,912	
Independent	Gaudencio L. San Juan	13,977	
Independent	Eduardo E. Recometa	10,797	
Independent	Rogelio G. Bonifacio	10,192	
Independent	Danilo M. Pangan	9,337	
Independent	Jovencio F. Mendoza	8,885	
Independent	Cesar C. Alzona	8,650	
Bicol Saro	Efren C. Neri	4,270	
Independent	Roy R. Ramos	2,775	

== Aftermath ==
Mayor Jejomar Binay will be term-limited in the next election in 1998. His wife, Elenita Binay ran in his place and won. Vice Mayor Nemesio Arturo "Toro" Yabut challenged Dr. Binay in the said election and lost. 1st District Representative Joker Arroyo will also be re-elected to his third and final term in 1998, while Butz Aquino will finally be elected without issue as 2nd District congressman.
