= 1971 Makati local elections =

Local elections in the Philippines

1971 Makati mayoral election
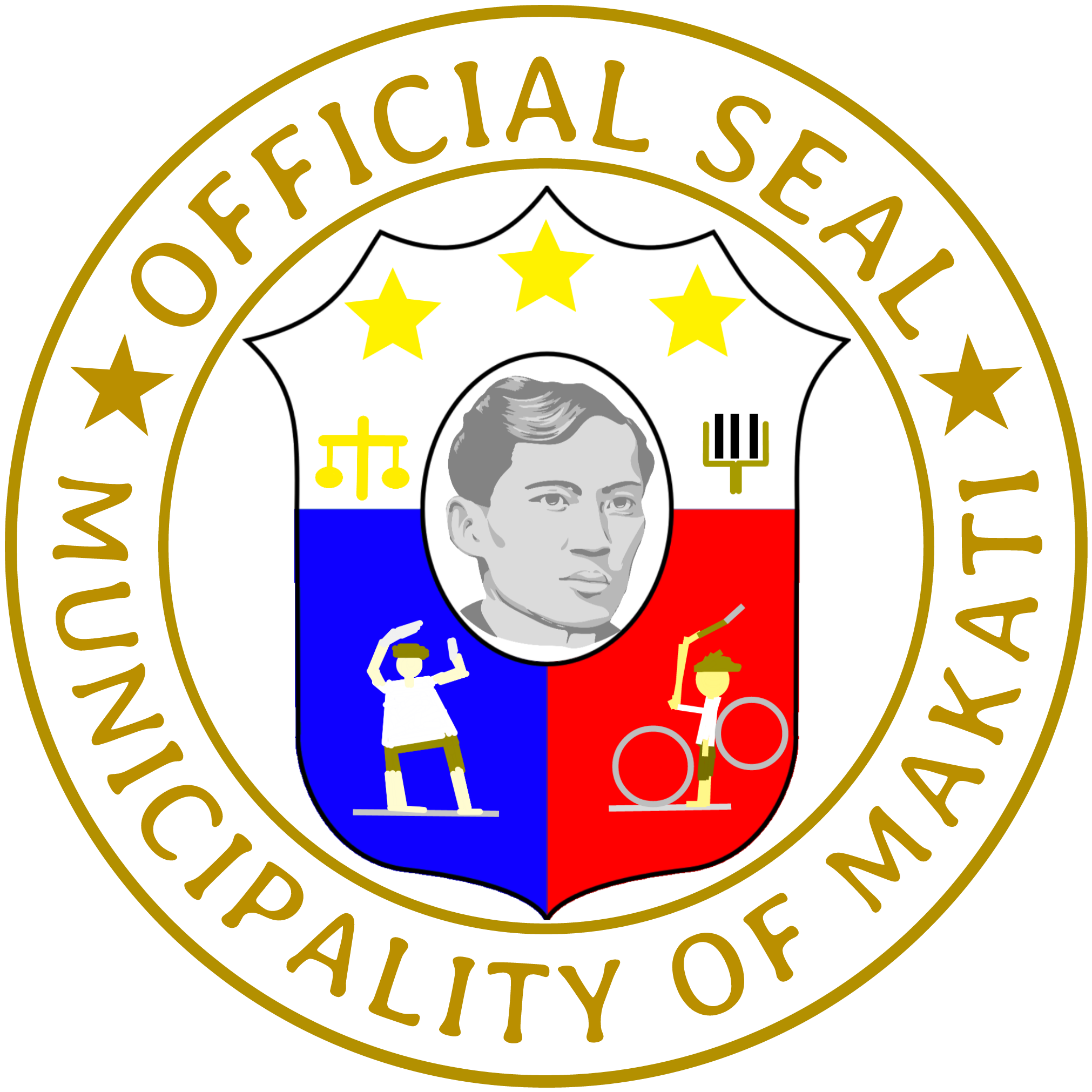
- November 8, 1971
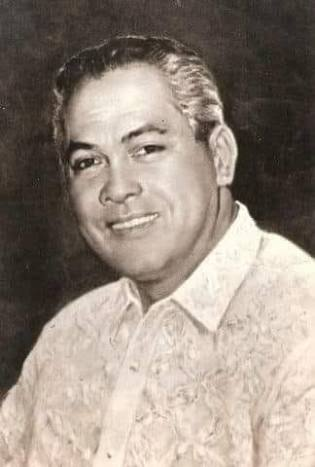

Nominee	Nemesio Yabut	Jose C. Luciano	Ruperto C. Gaite
Party	Liberal	Nacionalista	Independent
Running mate	Johnny Wilson	Jose Alarilla
Popular vote	25,843	18,917	10,477
Mayor before election
Cesar Alzona
Liberal
Elected mayor
Nemesio Yabut
Liberal
- Vice mayoral election
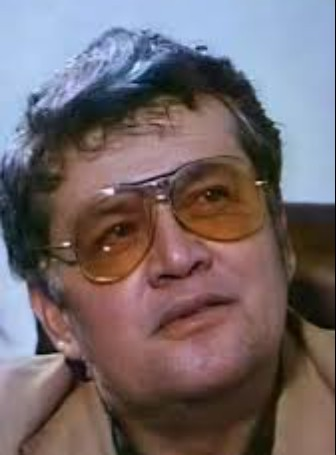
Candidate	Johnny Wilson	Jose Alarilla
Party	Liberal	Nacionalista
Popular vote	31,684	23,553
Vice Mayor before election
Teotimo Gealogo
Liberal
Elected Vice Mayor
Johnny Wilson
Liberal
- Municipal Council election

8 seats in the Makati Municipal Council 5 seats needed for a majority
	First party	Second party	Third party
Party	Liberal	Nacionalista	Independent
Last election	8 seats	0 seats	Did not participate
Seats won	3	3	2
Seat change	▼5	▲3	▲2

Local elections was held in the Municipality of Makati on November 8, 1971, within the 1971 Philippine local elections, during the administration of President Ferdinand Marcos. The voters elected for the elective local posts in the town: the mayor, vice mayor, and the eight-member local municipal council. This was the last election before the imposition of Martial Law in 1972. The municipality of Makati was then under the jurisdiction of the 1st congressional district of the Province of Rizal. The elections for the district representatives were held in 1969.

== Background ==
Incumbent Makati mayor Cesar Alzona, became acting mayor in October 1971 upon the resignation of then acting mayor Jose Luciano, who decided to run for reelection. Alzona decided to run as municipal councilor under the Liberal Party instead.

Nacionalista Party's candidate, Jose Luciano was the municipal mayor of Makati, from 1969 to October 1971, succeeding mayor Maximo Estrella, who was suspended following a corruption conviction involving overpriced traffic deflector mirrors. Luciano assumed the mayoralty in 1969 as the top-voted councilor in the 1967 elections, stepping up because Vice Mayor Teotimo Gealogo was also suspended. He later resigned in October 1971 to run for reelection as municipal mayor.

His challenger for mayor was businessman Nemesio Yabut of the Liberal Party. At the time, Philippine politics was under the two-party system, dominated by the Liberals and Nacionalistas.

== Candidates ==
=== Nacionalista Party ===
Nacionalista Party
Name	Party
For Mayor
Jose C. Luciano	Nacionalista
For Vice Mayor
Jose Alarilla	Nacionalista
For Councilor
Tomas A. Baluyut	Nacionalista
Benjamin Bautista	Nacionalista
Roberto "Bobby" G. Brillante Sr.	Nacionalista
Oscar Calvento	Nacionalista
Amado de Vera Jr.	Nacionalista
Michael M. Joseph	Nacionalista
Dolores M. Rivera	Nacionalista
Filomena Villamor	Nacionalista

=== Liberal Party ===
Liberal Party
Name	Party
For Mayor
Nemesio "Mesio" I. Yabut	Liberal
For Vice Mayor
Johnny S. Wilson	Liberal
For Councilor
Cesar C. Alzona	Liberal
Ignacio C. Babasa	Liberal
Alberto Estrella	Liberal
Teotimo Gealogo	Liberal
Pedro P. Ison	Liberal
Elena B. Maccay	Liberal
Bernardo P. Nonato	Liberal
Justino Ventura	Liberal

=== Independent ===
Independent
Name	Party
For Mayor
Ruperto C. Gaite	Independent
For Councilor
Rafael C. Gaite	Independent
Augusto V. Pangan Sr.	Independent
Joseph Leroy R. Salvador	Independent

== Results ==
=== Mayor ===
Nemesio Yabut defeated incumbent mayor Jose C. Luciano and Rizal vice governor Ruperto Gaite.

1971 Makati mayoral election
Candidate	Party	Votes	%
Nemesio Yabut	Liberal Party	25,843	46.79
Jose C. Luciano	Nacionalista Party	18,917	34.25
Ruperto C. Gaite	Independent	10,477	18.97
Total		55,237	100.00
Liberal hold			
Source: Philippine Commission on Elections

=== Vice Mayor ===
Actor Johnny Wilson won against Jose Alarilla.

1971 Makati vice mayoral election
Candidate	Party	Votes	%
Johnny S. Wilson	Liberal Party	31,684	57.36
Jose Alarilla	Nacionalista Party	23,553	42.64
Total		55,237	100.00
Liberal hold			
Source: Philippine Commission on Elections

=== Rizal 1st District Representative ===
Neptali Gonzales won as 1st congressional district representative against 12 other contenders, among them former representative Rufino Antonio. The election for this position was held on November 11, 1969. This district holds jurisdiction over the Municipality of Makati.

1969 Rizal's 1st congressional district representative election
Candidate	Party	Votes	%
Neptali Gonzales	Liberal Party	134,789	34.71
Felipe Ysmael Jr.	Independent	116,431	29.99
Nemesio Yabut	Nacionalista Party	104,486	26.91
Rufino D. Antonio	Independent	26,567	6.84
Antonio Quirino	Liberal Party Independent	3,817	0.98
Virgilio M. Ferrer	Independent	821	0.21
Filemon G. Alvarez	Independent	574	0.15
Wilfredo S. Torres	Liberal Party Independent	566	0.15
Isabelo P. Lim	Nacionalista Party Independent	200	0.05
Jaime F. de la Rosa Jr.	Liberal Party	21	0.01
Avelino L. Albert	Nacionalista Party	13	0.00
Jose V. Camu	Independent	2	0.00
Total		388,287	100.00
Liberal gain from Independent			
Source: Philippine Commission on Elections

=== Municipal Council ===
Three out of eight winning candidates came from the Liberal Party, three from the Nacionalista Party, while two were Independents (actors Chiquito and Leroy Salvador).

Municipal Council election at Makati's lone district
Party	Candidate	Votes	%
Liberal	Cesar C. Alzona	31,847	
Independent	Augusto "Chiquito" V. Pangan Sr.	28,936	
Nacionalista	Michael M. Joseph	26,583	
Liberal	Alberto Estrella	24,761	
Independent	Joseph Leroy R. Salvador	22,418	
Liberal	Elena B. Maccay	20,937	
Nacionalista	Dolores M. Rivera	19,264	
Nacionalista	Tomas A. Baluyut	17,836	
Liberal	Justino Ventura	11,683	
Nacionalista	Oscar Calvento	10,927	
Independent	Rafael C. Gaite	9,846	
Liberal	Pedro P. Ison	9,317	
Nacionalista	Roberto "Bobby" G. Brillante Sr	8,592	
Liberal	Teotimo Gealogo	7,781	
Nacionalista	Amado C. de Vera Jr	7,263	
Liberal	Bernardo P. Nonato	6,674	
Nacionalista	Benjamin Bautista	6,183	
Liberal	Juan E. Tengco	5,729	
Nacionalista	Filomena Villamor	4,981	
