= Judy Syjuco =

Filipino politician

Judy Jalbuena-Syjuco is a Filipino politician and was the Representative of the 2nd District of Iloilo in the 14th Congress. She is a member of Lakas CMD. She is the wife of former Iloilo 2nd District representative and Technical Education and Skills Development Authority director-general Augusto Syjuco Jr.
