= Elias Tolentino =

Filipino basketball player and politician

Member of Makati City Council Makati Municipal Council (1988–1995)
- In office June 30, 2001 – June 30, 2010
- Constituency: 2nd district
- In office February 2, 1988 – June 30, 1998
- Constituency: Lone district (1988–1995); 2nd district (1995–1998)

Personal details
- Born: November 5, 1942 Makati, City of Greater Manila, Philippine Commonwealth
- Died: November 19, 2017 (aged 75)
- Resting place: Heritage Memorial Park, Taguig
- Party: Nacionalista (1987–1988, 1992–1995, 2009–2010)
- Other political affiliations: Liberal (1988–1992); LDP (1995–2009)
- Basketball career

Personal information
- Listed height: 6 ft 2 in (188 cm)
- Listed weight: 170 lb (77 kg)

Career information
- High school: JRC (Mandaluyong)
- College: JRC
- Playing career: 1961–1977

Career history
- 1961–1963: Crispa
- 1963–1974: YCO
- 1976: Toyota
- 1977: 7-Up
Medals
Men's basketball
Representing Philippines
FIBA Asia Championship
Gold medal – first place	1963 Taipei	Team
Bronze medal – third place	1969 Bangkok	Team

Elias "Boy" Viray Tolentino Jr. (November 5, 1942 – November 19, 2017) was a Filipino basketball player who competed in the 1968 Summer Olympics. He also served as councilor in the lone district of Makati from 1988 to 1995 and in the city's 2nd district from 1995 to 1998 and again from 2001 to 2010.

He was also known as "The Mikado Man" because he became a product endorser for the Mikado noodle.

== Playing career ==
Elias was a five-time national player and one of the major faces in Philippine basketball in the 1960s and early 1970s. Tolentino played with champion teams in his junior to senior years. He was a proud player of the Jose Rizal College junior squad in 1959 that took the NCAA juniors basketball crown. He went on to try his mettle with the JRC Heavy Bombers in 1960 where his team lost to Freddie Webb and the Letran Knights for the NCAA seniors title.

Tolentino played for Crispa Redmanizers in the MICAA for the 1961–62 season as Crispa won a title in 1962. From 1963 to 1974, he figured in another champion squad - the YCO Painters. His first and most illustrious stint with the Philippine national team was in 1963, where the RP squad came home triumphant in defending its ABC crown in Taipei. He was also a member of the Philippine team that played in Yokohama, Japan for the 1964 pre-Olympic basketball tournament. He was again a member of the 1968 Mexico Olympic squad of the country and the Bangkok ABC in 1969. Tolentino's fifth and last stint with the national team was in the 1970 Asian Invitational basketball conference in Manila.

The ex-Olympian would play in the Philippine Basketball Association for Toyota in 1976 and Seven-Up in 1977.

== Death ==
Tolentino died on November 19, 2017. He is interred at the Heritage Memorial Park in Taguig.
