= Joker Arroyo =

Filipino politician (1927–2015)

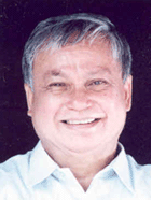

Senator of the Philippines
- In office June 30, 2001 – June 30, 2013

Chair of the Senate Blue Ribbon Committee
- In office July 23, 2001 – June 30, 2007
- Preceded by: Aquilino Pimentel Jr.
- Succeeded by: Alan Peter Cayetano

Member of the Philippine House of Representatives from Makati
- In office June 30, 1995 – June 30, 2001
- Preceded by: District established
- Succeeded by: Teodoro Locsin Jr.
- Constituency: 1st district
- In office June 30, 1992 – June 30, 1995
- Preceded by: Maria Consuelo Puyat-Reyes
- Succeeded by: District dissolved
- Constituency: Lone district

22nd Executive Secretary of the Philippines (Presidential Executive Assistant -1986)
- In office February 25, 1986 – September 15, 1987
- President: Corazon Aquino
- Preceded by: Juan Tuvera
- Succeeded by: Catalino Macaraig Jr.

Personal details
- Born: Ceferino Paz Arroyo, Jr. January 5, 1927 Naga, Camarines Sur, Philippine Islands
- Died: October 5, 2015 (aged 88) San Francisco, California, U.S.
- Party: Independent (1992–2001, 2002–2007, 2014–2015)
- Other political affiliations: Lakas (2008–2014); KAMPI (2007–2008); Aksyon (2001–2002); Lakas–NUCD–UMDP (2001); LAMMP (1998)
- Spouse(s): Odelia Gregorio; Felicitas Aquino
- Education: Ateneo de Manila University (AA); University of the Philippines Diliman (LL.B)
- Profession: Lawyer
- Website: Senate Profile

Ceferino "Joker" Paz Arroyo Jr. (Tagalog pronunciation: [ɐˈɾɔjɔ]; January 5, 1927 – October 5, 2015) was a Filipino statesman and key figure in the 1986 EDSA People Power Revolution that ousted dictator Ferdinand Marcos. He was a Congressman for Makati from 1992 to 2001 and Senator from 2001 to 2013. Arroyo received various awards and commendations for his significant contributions to the law profession and public service. Among these are the Philippine Bar Association's Most Distinguished Award for Justice as a "man beholden to no one except to his country" and Senate Resolution No. 100 enacted in the 8th Congress citing his invaluable service to the Filipino people. He was also known for being the thriftiest legislator, earning the title of "Scrooge of Congress", as he only had few staff members without bodyguards and did not use his pork barrel funds. In 2018, Arroyo was identified by the Human Rights Victims' Claims Board as a Motu proprio human rights violations victim of the Martial Law Era.

== Early life ==
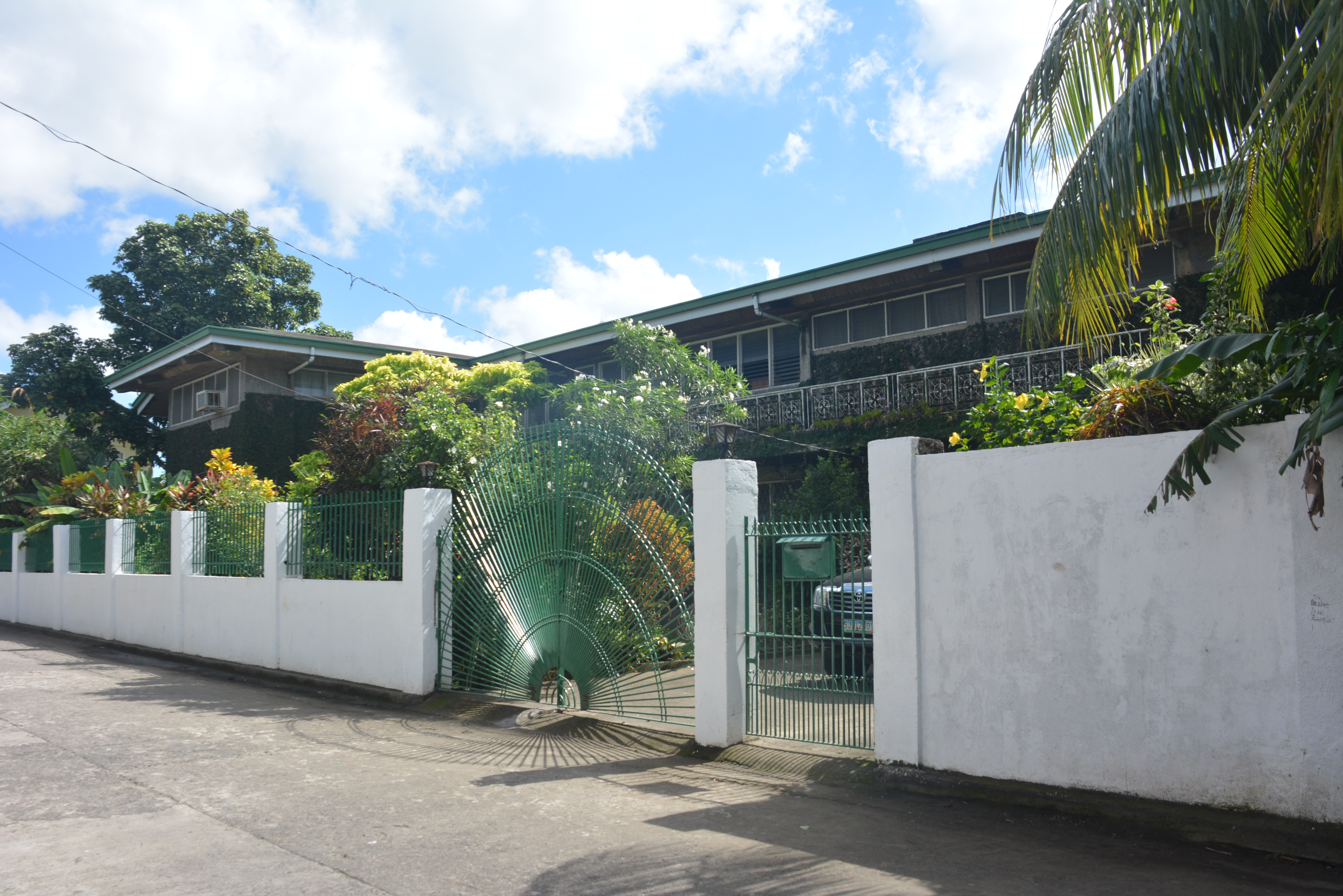
Arroyo ancestral house in Baao, Camarines Sur

Joker Arroyo was born on January 5, 1927, in Naga, Camarines Sur, to Ceferino Barrameda Arroyo, Sr. (1884–1949) and Eusebia Bance Paz (1898–1949). His parents were married on April 23, 1919, in Naga, Camarines Sur. He has seven siblings, including Zeferino "Tong", Jack (a former vice governor of Camarines Sur), and Nonito, from Baao, Camarines Sur. His name "Joker," as well as his siblings', was derived from his father's fondness for card playing.

=== Education ===
Arroyo completed his elementary education at the Naga Central School I in Naga, Camarines Sur and secondary education at the Camarines Sur National High School also in Naga City. He obtained his Associate of Arts in Public Law at the Ateneo de Manila University (pre-law). In 1952, his Bachelor of Laws from the UP College of Law at the University of the Philippines Diliman. He is a member of the Upsilon Sigma Phi fraternity, batch 1948.

== Career ==
=== As a lawyer ===
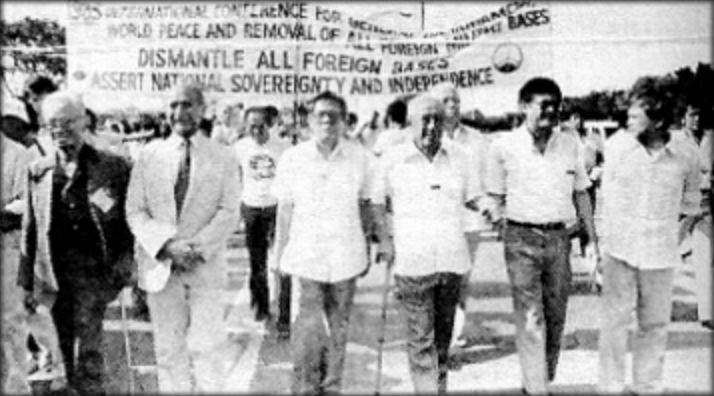
Anti-Bases Coalition Rally with José W. Diokno, Lorenzo Tañada Sr., and J. B. L. Reyes in 1983

Arroyo started his professional career as lawyer in 1953. Most of his clients belonged to the middle class and low income families.

On September 23, 1972, President Ferdinand Marcos declared Proclamation No. 1081, placing the entire Philippines under Martial Law. Arroyo was the very first lawyer to challenge the act before the Supreme Court and questioned its legality under the 1935 Philippine Constitution.

Arroyo and other lawyers joined in questioning other Marcos' acts before the Supreme Court: 1) the ratification of the Marcos-dictated 1973 Constitution; 2) Amendment Six that empowered President Marcos to exercise lawmaking powers alongside the Batasang Pambansa; 3) the power of military tribunals to try civilians. These protestations did not stop Marcos' consolidation of power at the time, but showed that not all leading Filipinos were fully supportive of him.

Arroyo participated in the trials of political detainees such as Senator Benigno Aquino Jr., ABS-CBN Executive Eugenio Lopez Jr., business executive Sergio Osmeña III, Communist Party of the Philippines founder Jose Maria Sison, Senators Jovito Salonga and Eva Estrada-Kalaw, lawyers Aquilino Pimentel Jr., Renato Tañada, Eduardo Olaguer and many others.

Arroyo actively participated in street demonstrations. He was gassed, injured and hospitalized during protest rallies and incarcerated in a military stockade. He was one of the founders of the civic group Movement for the Advancement of the Brotherhood, Integrity, Nationalism and Independence (MABINI) and the Free Legal Assistance Group (FLAG).

When Corazon Aquino decided to challenge Ferdinand Marcos in the 1986 Snap Presidential Election, Arroyo served as counsel for Aquino during the snap election. During the first EDSA Revolution, he served as one Aquino's key advisers.

=== Political career ===
==== As Executive Secretary ====
Arroyo was appointed as the Presidential Executive Assistant, later reverted as Executive Secretary, and he was one of the first appointees of Corazon Aquino after she was inaugurated at the Club Filipino in San Juan, Metro Manila. Arroyo served as Aquino's alter ego in her issuance of Executive Orders (formerly Presidential Decrees). These include the creation of the Family Code, the Presidential Commission on Good Government, creation of the 1986 Freedom Constitution, and the removal of local government officials loyal to Marcos and appointment of Officers-In-Charge. One Aquino decision, the release of Communist leader Jose Maria Sison, sparked the September 1987 coup attempt initiated by rebel military leaders. Due to intense pressure from the Philippine Congress in the following months, Aquino accepted Arroyo's resignation.

Aside from being Executive Secretary, he became chair of the Philippine National Bank and executive director for the Philippines at the Asian Development Bank from 1986 to 1990.

Arroyo has received various awards and commendations for his significant contributions to the law profession and public service. Among these are the Philippine Bar Association's Most Distinguished Award for Justice as a "man beholden to no one except to his country" and a Senate Resolution No. 100 enacted in the 8th Congress commending him for his invaluable services to the Filipino people.

==== As congressman ====
Arroyo ran independent for the position of congressman in the lone district of Makati in 1992. He was in caucus with the PDP–Laban, having been named to the local ticket of incumbent Mayor Jejomar Binay. However, his first election was annulled by the House of Representatives Electoral Tribunal (HRET) on January 25, 1995, as a result of an electoral protest filed by his closest rival Augusto Syjuco Jr., citing irregularities in the vote count at most precincts. Arroyo challenged the HRET ruling and filed a counter-protest questioning Syjuco's residency, which was eventually dismissed. The ruling was later reversed on July 14, 1995, two weeks after his first term ended.

Arroyo passed several national bills and some local bills like the cityhood of Makati, including the reapportionment of Makati into two districts. Following the cityhood and reapportionment of Makati in 1995, Arroyo ran for the first district in the 1995 elections and won. Due to the disqualification of second district representative-elect Butz Aquino over lack of residency, Arroyo was the only representative from Makati during the 10th Congress. He ran for re-election in 1998 under the Laban ng Makabayang Masang Pilipino coalition and won. He also ran for House Speaker during the opening of the 11th Congress in July 1998, but lost to Las Piñas Representative Manny Villar. He became a popular figure in the House of Representatives with a 100% attendance record for nine years from the time he was elected up to the end of his last term.

In November 2000, Arroyo was one of the last congressmen to sign the endorsement for the impeachment of President Joseph Estrada. He was voted the Lead Prosecutor for the impeachment trial in December 2000. He fought for the opening of the second bank envelope and its presentation was a critical evidence for the prosecution of Estrada. The Senate voted down his request and this led to the second EDSA Revolution. His role in the impeachment trial earned him one of preferred choices in the Social Weather Stations and Pulse Asia survey for a Senate race. The new government, led by President Gloria Macapagal Arroyo, convinced Congressman Arroyo to run for the Senate. He was named to the People Power Coalition's senatorial slate, as well as being a member of the Lakas–NUCD–UMDP party. Arroyo received a huge number of votes from the electorate, placing 5th with more than 11 million votes.

==== As Senator ====
Arroyo chaired the Senate Blue Ribbon Committee, the Senate Justice and Human Rights Committee, and the Senate Public Services Committee during the 13th Congress. He claimed to have never traveled abroad on government money and his Statement of Assets and Liabilities remained almost unchanged from the time he entered public service in 1986. He was re-elected to his second and final term in 2007 under the administration TEAM Unity coalition, placing 8th with more than 11 million votes.

Arroyo had accused President Benigno Aquino III of consolidating power and behaving like a dictator when, in 2011, the president led a successful effort to impeach Supreme Court Chief Justice Renato Corona. Arroyo was one of the three senators who voted to acquit. The Aquino administration called the impeachment and conviction a significant victory in its anticorruption efforts.

Arroyo retired from public service at the end of his Senate term on June 30, 2013.

== Post-Senate ==
Arroyo, alongside Rene Saguisag, served as counsel for Makati Mayor Junjun Binay during the Senate Blue Ribbon Committee investigation into alleged anomalies involving the Binay family in 2015. He had asked the Senate to end the hearing, which was then ongoing since August 2014, because it "has lasted too long already" and to revisit their rules. He criticized the investigation for violating due process over the detention of officials including Binay.

== Death ==
Arroyo died on October 5, 2015, in San Francisco, California, after an unsuccessful heart surgery. He was 88. His remains were silently brought to the Philippines for burial.

== Personal life ==
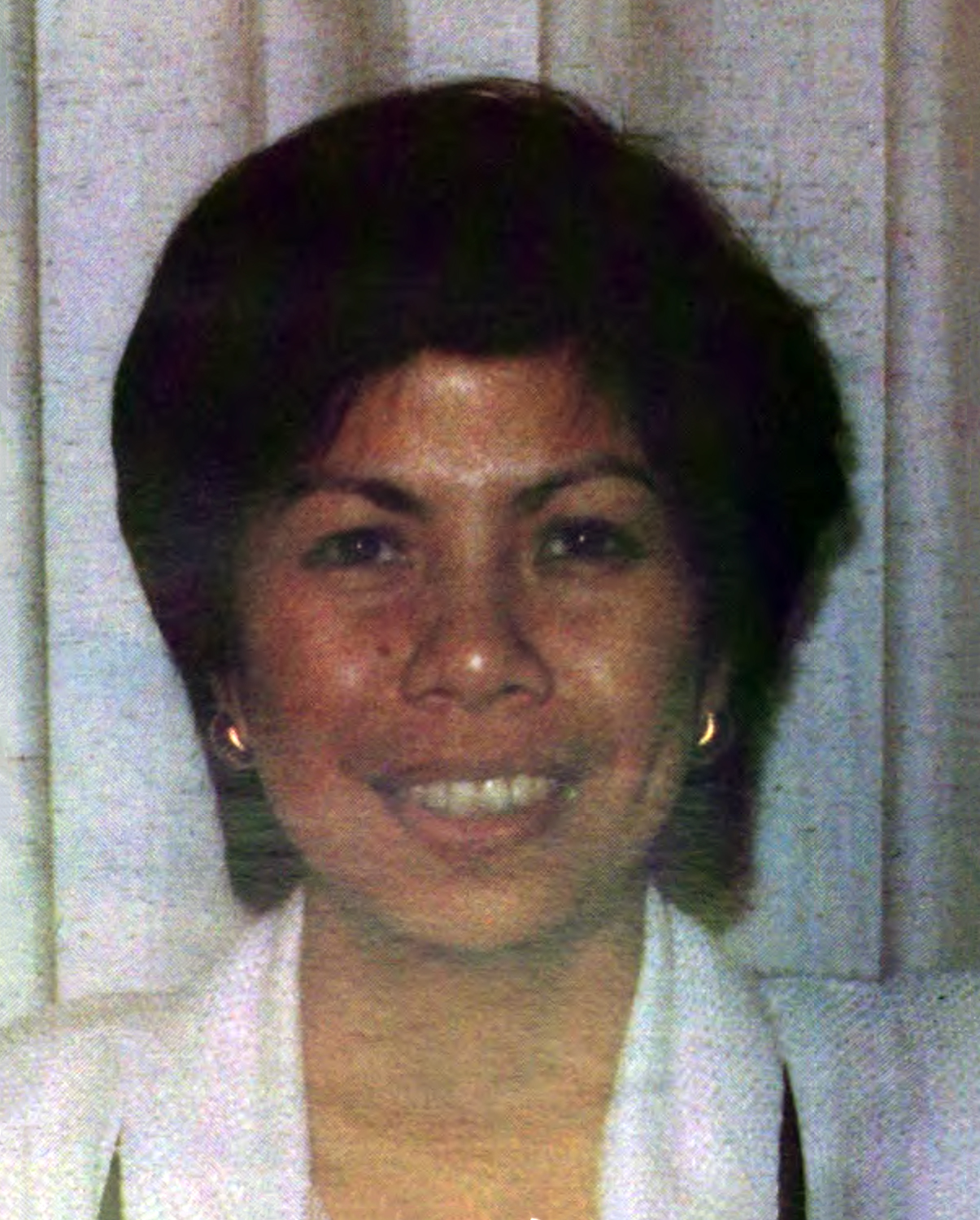
Joker's second wife, 1986 Constitutional Commission member Felicitas Sañez Aquino

Joker Arroyo was married twice. His first wife was Gregg Shoes entrepreneur Odelia Gregorio. Their eldest daughter is Ma. Antonia Odelia "Maoi" Gregorio Arroyo, CEO of Hybridigm Consulting, the first biotechnology commercialization firm in the Philippines. Maoi was hailed by Entrepreneur Magazine as one of the top 35 entrepreneurs under 35 in the Philippines. His second daughter, Ma. Zef Francisca "Baba" Arroyo, is an entrepreneur, artist, and pastry chef. His second wife was successful lawyer Felicitas S. Aquino, a member of the 1986 Constitutional Commission. Their daughter is Joker's namesake and a champion equestrian, whose career highlights include a team gold medal for the Philippines at the 2005 Southeast Asian Games, among many other medal performances with the Philippine team. The younger Joker graduated from the British School Manila in 2006, and Yale University in 2010.

Although they have the same surname, Joker Arroyo is not related to former President Gloria Macapagal Arroyo nor her husband Jose Miguel Arroyo.

Arroyo resided in Camarines Sur, where his family owned an ancestral house in Baao—though he identified himself as a Nagueño as he was born in Naga, Camarines Sur—and in Dasmariñas Village, Makati.

== Legacy ==
In 2018, the Human Rights Victims' Claims Board (HRVCB) formally recognized Arroyo and 126 other individuals as a motu proprio victim of human rights violations committed under the Marcos Sr. dictatorship.

== Electoral history ==
Electoral history of Joker Arroyo
Year	Office	Party	Votes received				Result
Year	Office	Party	Total	%	P.	Swing	Result
1992	Representative (Makati–at-large)	Independent	97,055	46.66	1st	—N/a	Won
1995	Representative (Makati–1st)	Independent	68,092	72.67	1st	—N/a	Won
1998	Representative (Makati–1st)	LAMMP	91,269	70.94	1st	-1.73	Won
2001	Senator	Lakas	11,262,402	38.21	5th	—N/a	Won
2007	Senator	KAMPI	11,803,107	40.01	8th	+1.80	Won

Political offices
Preceded by Juan Tuvera as Presidential Executive Assistant	Executive Secretary; 1986–1987	Succeeded by Catalino Macaraig, Jr.
House of Representatives of the Philippines
Preceded by Maria Consuelo Puyat-Reyes	Member of the House of Representatives from Makati's at-large district 1992–1998	District dissolved
New district	Member of the House of Representatives from Makati's 1st district 1998–2001	Succeeded by Teodoro L. Locsin, Jr.
