= Augusto Syjuco Jr. =

Filipino politician (1942–2020)

Member of the House of Representatives of the Philippines from Iloilo's 2nd District
- In office June 30, 2010 – June 30, 2013
- Preceded by: Judy Syjuco
- Succeeded by: Arcadio Gorriceta
- In office June 30, 1998 – June 30, 2004
- Preceded by: Alberto J. Lopez
- Succeeded by: Judy Syjuco

Director-General of the Technical Education and Skills Development Authority
- In office August 2004 – March 1, 2010
- Preceded by: Alcestis Guiang
- Succeeded by: Rogelio Peyuan

Vice President of the 1971 Philippine Constitutional Convention
- In office 1971

Personal details
- Born: Augusto L. Syjuco Jr. December 1942
- Died: January 13, 2020 (aged 77) Singapore
- Party: Laban ng Demokratikong Pilipino
- Other political affiliations: United Nationalist Alliance
- Spouse: Judy Syjuco
- Education: University of the East (BS); Wharton School (MBA)

Augusto L. "Boboy" Syjuco Jr. (December 1942 – January 13, 2020) was a Filipino politician and college instructor. He served three terms in the House of Representatives of the Philippines and was the director-general of the Technical Education and Skills Development Authority. After leaving the House of Representatives, he was convicted of graft and corruption by the Sandiganbayan, which he helped establish.

== Early life ==
Syjuco was born in December 1942. His father, Augusto L. Syjuco Sr. was a teacher. Syjuco attended Ateneo de Manila University for his primary and secondary education.

Syjuco enrolled in the University of the East in 1959, graduating with a Bachelor of Science in business administration cum laude in 1963. While there, he was president of the student government, the Senior Executive County, and the International Friendship Organization. He was the university's representative to the National Union of Students of the Philippines and was the national president of the Conference Delegates' Association of the Philippines. He also joined Alpha Phi Omega service fraternity and served as its chancellor. He received the Outstanding Scholarship and Leadership Award from the UE Junior Assembly in 1962, the UE Service Award in 1963, and the 1963 Most Outstanding Graduate Award.

Syjuco went on the Wharton School of the University of Pennsylvania, where he received a Master of Business Administration.

== Career ==
After graduate school, Syjuco taught advertising, market research, marketing, and sales management at the University of the East. He became passionate about the growing Filipino nationalism of the era, leading Syjuco to participate in numerous projects and campaigns. For his efforts, Syjuco received the Public Service Award from Makati in 1971.

Syjuco was the vice president of the Philippines Constitutional Convention of 1971. He authored and sponsored provisions that were adopted by the 1986 Constitutional Commission, including accountability of public officials, the Sandiganbayan anti-graft court, and the Office of the Ombudsman.

For 26 years, Syjuco owned the franchise and local distribution rights for 7 Up and RC Cola. After selling the franchise, he helped his former employees secure the distributorships.

Syjuco was a member of the House of Representatives of the Philippines for two consecutive terms, from 1998 to 2001 for the 10th district, and 2001 to 2004 for the 12th district. He was a member of the Laban ng Demokratikong Pilipino political party. He served on sixteen committees, including serving as the appropriations chairman for the agriculture section, chairman of the Committee on Suffage and Elector Reforms, and senior vice chair of the Blue Ribbon Committee. In addition to his primary focus on education, he also pushed for the Overseas Voting Act and the Philippine Citizenship Retention and Reacquisition Act.

President Gloria Macapagal Arroyo appointed Syjuco to the position of director-general of the Technical Education and Skills Development Authority; he served in this capacity from 2004 to 2007. Two of his projects were the Ladderized Education Project (LEP) and the youth career profiling program YP4SC. Syjuco believed that eduation was the equalizer in society.

Syjuco had an unsuccessful run for the Senate of the Philippines. He returned to the House of Representatives of the Philippines in 2010, serving until 2013. This time, he ran under the United Nationalist Alliance party. He was unsuccessful in his run for a fourth term in 2013.

In 2015, Syjuco filed to run for President of the Philippines in 2016 as a candidate for the Kilusang Bagong Lipunan party. However, the Second Division of the Commission on Elections (Comelec) cancelled his certificate of candidacy after agreeing with a petition from the Comelec Law Department to declare him a "nuisance candidate". Comelec found that "Syjuco has no bona fide intention to run for president".

In August 2019, Syjuco was convicted by the Sandiganbayan of two counts of graft of pork barrel funds from when was in the House of Representatives. He admitted to the P4.3-million cash grant from the Department of Agriculture and was offered a plea bargain due to his poor health. Changes against him were dropped after he died.

== Personal life ==
Syjuco's wife, Judy Syjuco, filled his seat in the House of Representatives for Iloilo 2nd District in 2004. His wife was convicted by the anti-graft court in November 2021 due to her 2006 misuse of a P20 million priority development assistance fund.

In February 2007, the University of the East Alumni Association recognized Syjuco as a 2006 Diamond Jubilee Alumni Achiever.

In March 2019, Syjuco was ill with myelodysplastic syndrome. He went to Singapore for treatment. Syjuco died on January 10, 2020, in Singapore at the age of 77.
