= Maria Consuelo Puyat-Reyes =

Filipino politician (born 1937)

The Honourable Maria Consuelo Puyat-Reyes
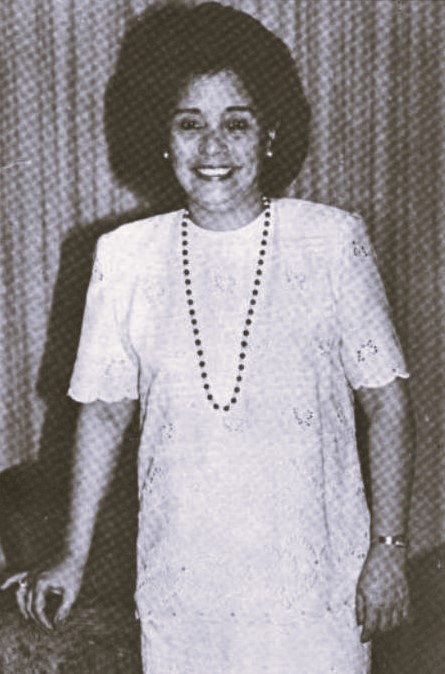
- Puyat-Reyes official portrait during the 8th Congress.

Ambassador of the Philippines to Chile
- In office 1999–2015
- President: Joseph Estrada; Gloria Macapagal Arroyo; Benigno Aquino III

Member of the Philippine House of Representatives from Makati's at-large congressional district
- In office June 30, 1987 – June 30, 1992
- Preceded by: Ruperto Gaite (as Assemblyman)
- Succeeded by: Joker Arroyo

Personal details
- Born: Maria Consuelo Gil Puyat; November 26, 1937 (age 88) Manila, Philippine Commonwealth
- Party: PDP–Laban (c. 1987); Lakas ng Bansa (c. 1987); LDP (c. 1992); Lakas–NUCD–UMDP (c. 1995)
- Spouse: Gregorio Reyes
- Occupation: Politician, ambassador

Maria Consuelo Gil Puyat-Reyes (born November 26, 1937) is a Filipino politician and diplomat. She served as ambassador of the Philippines to Chile from 1999 to 2015 and as a congresswoman from Makati from 1987 to 1992. She also unsuccessfully ran for mayor of Makati in 1992 and representative for Makati's 1st district in 1995.

Puyat-Reyes is the daughter of Deogracias Puyat, a lawyer, and Patria Gil. She is the granddaughter of Pedro Gil, a diplomat and legislator from Manila. She attended St. Paul's College where she earned her bachelor's degree in education. She also has a master's degree in business economics from the Center for Research and Communication. She was married to Gregorio Reyes.

Throughout the 1980s, Puyat-Reyes headed the annual anti-tuberculosis fund campaign organized by the Philippine Tuberculosis Society. In January 2000, the Makati Regional Trial Court ordered Puyat-Reyes to be arrested for failing to testify regarding the estate of her late husband. The case is about her and her stepdaughters, Christina and Rina.

House of Representatives of the Philippines
Preceded by Ruperto Gaite (as Assemblyman)	Member of the House of Representatives from Makati's at-large district 1987–1992	Succeeded by Joker Arroyo
