= Nemesio Yabut =

Filipino politician and businessman

Nemesio Yábut
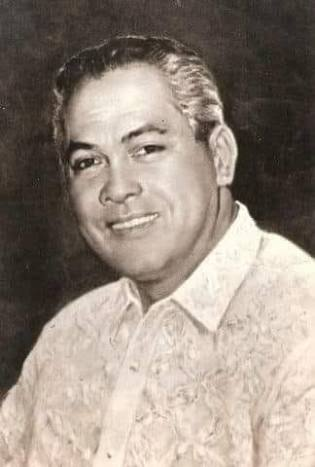

16th Mayor of Makati
- In office January 1, 1972 – February 25, 1986
- Vice Mayor: Johnny Wilson
- Preceded by: Cesar Alzona
- Succeeded by: Jejomar Binay (OIC)

President of the Asian Volleyball Confederation
- In office 1976–1979
- Preceded by: Masaichi Nishikawa
- Succeeded by: Yutaka Maeda

Chairman of the Philippine Racing Commission
- In office 1978–1986
- President: Ferdinand Marcos
- Preceded by: Danding Cojuangco
- Succeeded by: Augusto Santos

Personal details
- Born: Nemesio Isip Yábut; December 19, 1925 Makati, Rizal, Philippine Islands
- Died: February 25, 1986 (aged 60) Makati, Metro Manila, Philippines
- Party: KBL (1978–1986)
- Other political affiliations: Nacionalista (1969–1971); Liberal (1971–1978)
- Spouse: Corrine Siddons
- Children: 7

Nemesio "Mesio" Isip Yábut (December 19, 1925 – February 25, 1986) was a Filipino politician and businessman who served as Mayor of Makati from 1972 until his death in 1986.

== Early life and education ==
Nemesio Yábut was born on December 19, 1925, in Makati (then a municipality part of Rizal) to Fabian Yábut and Irene Isip. He was the fourth of five children. His father was a soldier. He studied elementary at the Fort McKinley Elementary School, a school for the U.S. Army dependents. Fabian Yábut died ten years after his birth, and Yábut was transferred to Guadalupe Nuevo Elementary School (now Nemesio Yábut Elementary School).

When the World War II broke out, he helped his family by doing odd jobs. After the end of the war. Yabut wanted to resume his education, but he was too poor to pay for this. He joined the Makati Police force as a sergeant.

== Business career ==
Yábut formed the Guaranteed Commercial Delivery Services Inc. (Guacods Inc.) in 1959. This business was success, and in 1960, Yabut and his company won a bid for a warehouse in a pier zone.

== Career ==
=== Politics ===
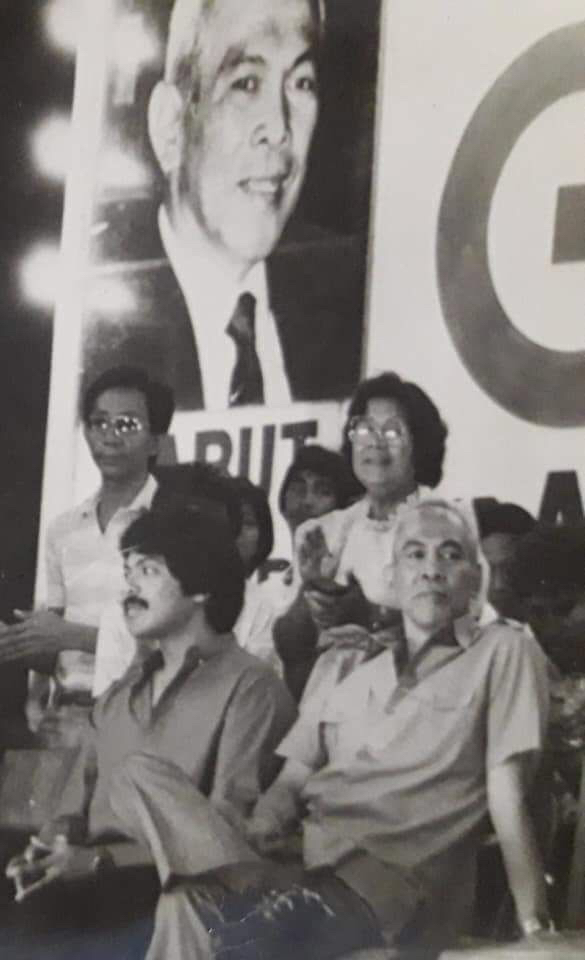
Yabut (front right) during a town hall meeting in 1972

In 1969, Yábut ran for congressman of the first district of Rizal, but lost to Vice Governor Neptali Gonzales. Two years later, in 1971, he was elected mayor of Makati and took office on the first day of 1972. He was the member of the Kilusang Bagong Lipunan and was an ally of former president Ferdinand Marcos. In 1980, Yábut was reelected in the same position.

=== Sports administration ===
From 1978 to 1986, he was appointed as chairman of the Philippine Racing Commission. He also served as president of Asian Volleyball Confederation from 1976 to 1979.

== Personal life ==
Yábut was married to Corrine Siddons. They had seven children together, including Nemesio Arturo "Toro" III, who served as Makati Vice Mayor from 1992 to 1998, Ricardo "Ricky", who unsuccessfully ran for mayor of Makati in 1988 and 2019, and Nemesio Jr. "King", who has served as 2nd district councilor from 2001 to 2007, 2010 to 2019, and since 2025. His grandchild and Arturo's daughter, Anna Alcina "Alcine" Yábut, has served as councilor of Makati from the 1st district since 2019.

== Death and legacy ==
On February 7, 1986, the day of the snap elections, Yábut became ill and he was admitted to a hospital in Makati. He died at 1:30 am on February 25, 1986 (the last day of the People Power Revolution). He was succeeded by Jejomar Binay as Officer-in-Charge (OIC) two days later, on February 27, 1986.

The Guadalupe Nuevo Elementary School, where Yábut studied, was renamed as Nemesio Yábut Elementary School. Nemesio Yábut Senior High School was founded in 2016.

Political offices
| Preceded by Cesar Alzona | Mayor of Makati; 1972–1986 | Succeeded by Jejomar Binay; OIC |
Sporting positions
| Preceded by Masaichi Nishikawa | President of the Asian Volleyball Confederation; 1976–1979 | Succeeded by Yutaka Maeda |
Government offices
| Preceded by Danding Cojuangco | President of the Philippine Racing Commission; 1978–1986 | Succeeded by Augusto Benedicto Santos |
