= Makati's at-large congressional district =

Congressional district of the Philippines

- Former constituency for the House of Representatives of the Philippines
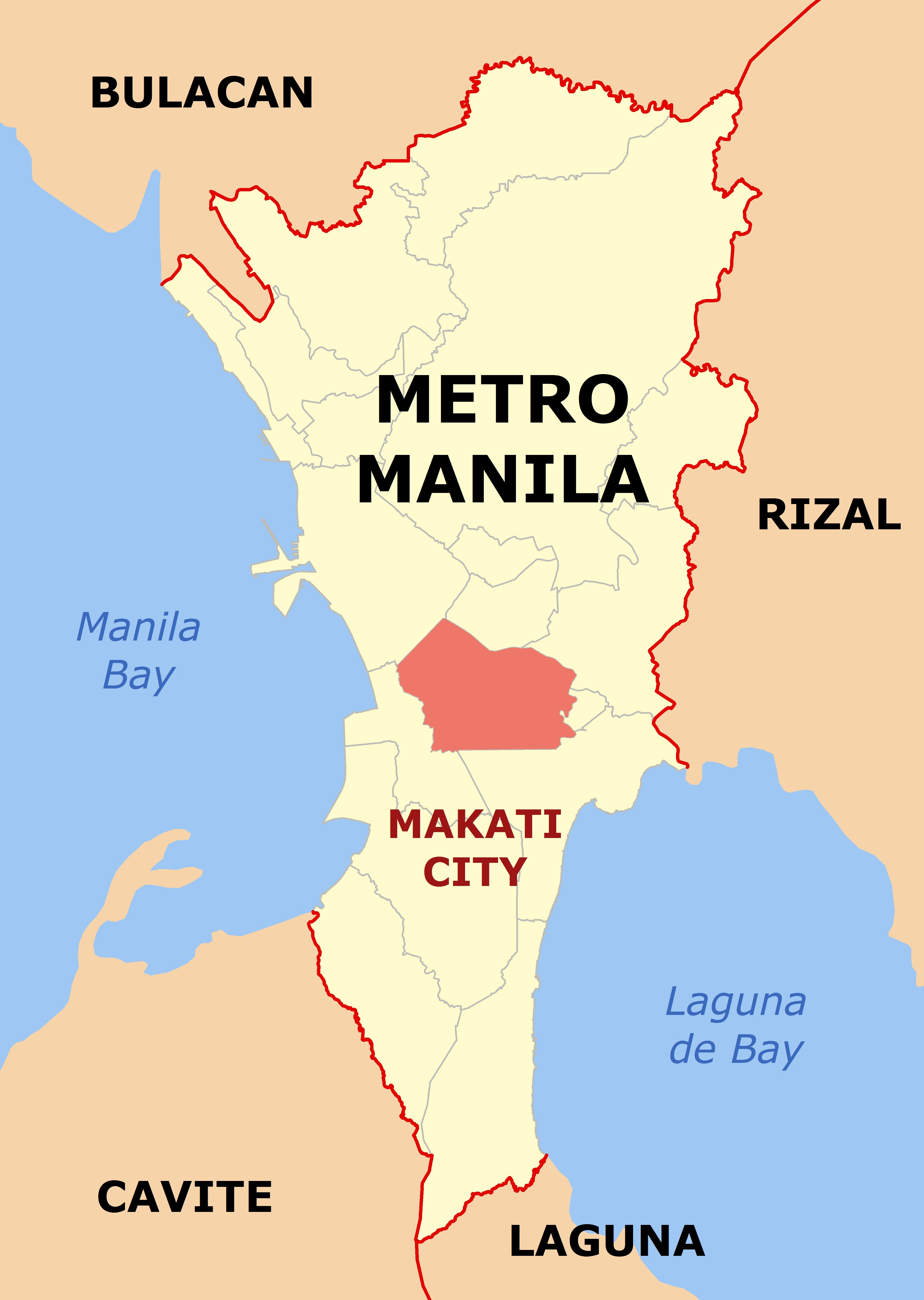
- Location of Makati within Metro Manila
- City: Makati
- Region: Metro Manila
- Population: 484,176 (1995)
- Major settlements: Makati

Former constituency
- Created: 1984
- Abolished: 1995

Makati's at-large congressional district may refer to two occasions when a city-wide or provincewide at-large district was used for elections to the Regular Batasang Pambansa from Makati in the Philippines.

Makati first gained a separate representation in 1984 when it returned one representative to the Regular Batasang Pambansa. The municipality continued to constitute a separate congressional district under the new constitution proclaimed on February 11, 1987. It was divided into two districts when Makati became a city pursuant to Republic Act No. 7854 and approved by plebiscite on February 4, 1995. Electing two separate district representatives was later officially administered in 1995, effectively abolishing the at-large district in the same year.

Before Makati gained a separate representation, it was a part of Manila's at-large congressional district from 1898 to 1899 (as part of the province of Manila) and from 1943 to 1944 (as part of the City of Greater Manila) and Rizal's 1st congressional district from 1907 to 1941 and from 1945 to 1972.

== Representation history ==
#	Image	Member	Term of office		Congress	Party	Electoral history
#	Image	Member	Start	End	Congress	Party	Electoral history
=== Makati's at-large district for the Regular Batasang Pambansa ===
District created February 1, 1984 from Region IV's at-large district.
1		Ruperto C. Gaite	July 23, 1984	March 25, 1986	2nd	KBL	Elected in 1984.
#	Image	Member	Term of office		Congress	Party	Electoral history
#	Image	Member	Start	End	Congress	Party	Electoral history
=== Makati's at-large district for the House of Representatives of the Philippines ===
District re-created February 2, 1987.
2		Maria Consuelo Puyat-Reyes	June 30, 1987	June 30, 1992	8th	PDP–Laban	Elected in 1987.
2		Maria Consuelo Puyat-Reyes	June 30, 1987	June 30, 1992	8th	LDP	Elected in 1987.
3		Ceferino "Joker" P. Arroyo Jr.	June 30, 1992	June 30, 1995	9th	Independent	Elected in 1992. Election annulled by the House electoral tribunal January 25, 1995 but reversed by the Supreme Court July 14, 1995. Redistricted to the 1st district.
District dissolved into Makati's 1st and 2nd districts.

== See also ==
- Legislative districts of Makati
