= List of legislatures of the Philippines =

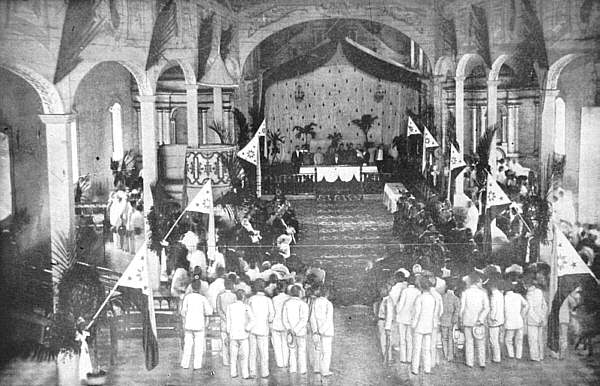
The Malolos Congress

The pre-martial law Senate

The Philippines has been governed by legislatures since 1898. The country has had different setups, with legislatures under the presidential system and the parliamentary system, and with legislatures having one or two chambers.

The first national legislature in the Philippines was the Malolos Congress that convened in the Barasoain Church at Malolos, Bulacan. Convened after the declaration of independence from Spain at the height of the Philippine Revolution, the Congress ratified the declaration, and drafted a constitution. With the capture of President Emilio Aguinaldo during the ensuing Philippine–American War, the unrecognized First Philippine Republic fell.

The Americans then sent several commissions to assess the situation; these eventually became the Philippine Commission. With the passage of the Philippine Bill of 1902, the Philippine Commission eventually became an appointive upper house of the new Philippine Legislature, of which the wholly elected Philippine Assembly was the lower house. The passage of the Philippine Autonomy Act instituted a mostly elective Senate as the upper house, with the House of Representatives as the lower house. This set up continued until the 1935 Constitution of the Philippines was set into force, creating a unicameral National Assembly under the Commonwealth of the Philippines. Amendments that took effect in 1941 restored the bicameral setup, creating the Commonwealth Congress. However, World War II intervened, and legislators elected in 1941 were not able to serve. The invading Japanese set up the Second Philippine Republic that convened its own National Assembly.

The Allies reconquered the Philippines and the legislators elected in 1941 who are either still alive or are not arrested for collaboration convened in 1945. The Americans granted independence on July 4, 1946, and the Commonwealth Congress was renamed as Congress of the Republic of the Philippines. This will continue until the declaration of martial law by President Ferdinand Marcos on September 23, 1972, which effectively dissolved Congress. Marcos then exercised legislative power; his 1973 Constitution created the unicameral Batasang Pambansa, a parliament. The Batasang Pambansa first convened in 1978, and will continue to exist until the 1986 People Power Revolution that overthrew Marcos from power. President Corazon Aquino appointed a constitutional commission that drafted the 1987 Constitution which restored the bicameral Congress with the presidential system of government.

== List of legislatures per legislative term ==
=== Malolos Congress (1898–1899) ===
Term	Legislature	Upper house				Lower (or sole) house				Sessions	Era
Term	Legislature	Name	Election date	Election results	Seats	Name	Election date	Election results	Seats	Sessions	Era
1	Malolos Congress	Unicameral assembly				Revolutionary Congress	June 23 to September 10, 1898	▌68 nonpartisan	136	September 15, 1898 – January 22, 1899	Revolutionary government
1	Malolos Congress	Unicameral assembly				Assembly of Representatives	June 23 to September 10, 1898	▌68 nonpartisan	136	January 23, 1899 – November 13, 1899	First Republic

=== Philippine Commission (1900–1916) ===
Term	Legislature	Upper house				Lower (or sole) house				Sessions	Era
Term	Legislature	Name	Election date	Election results	Seats	Name	Election date	Election results	Seats	Sessions	Era
2	Second Philippine Commission	Unicameral assembly				Philippine Commission	Unelected		5–8	March 16, 1900 – October 16, 1916	U.S. military government

=== Philippine Legislature (1916–1935) ===
Term	Legislature	Upper house				Lower (or sole) house				Sessions	Era
Term	Legislature	Name	Election date	Election results	Seats	Name	Election date	Election results	Seats	Sessions	Era
3	1st Legislature	Philippine Commission	Unelected		8–9	Philippine Assembly	July 30, 1907	▌59 Nacionalista ▌16 Progresista ▌5 others	80	October 16, 1907 – May 20, 1909	U.S. Insular Government
4	2nd Legislature	Philippine Commission	Unelected		9–10	Philippine Assembly	November 2, 1909	▌62 Nacionalista ▌17 Progresista ▌2 independent	81	March 28, 1910 – February 6, 1912	U.S. Insular Government
5	3rd Legislature	Philippine Commission	Unelected		7–8	Philippine Assembly	June 4, 1912	▌62 Nacionalista ▌16 Progresista ▌3 independent	81	October 16, 1912 – February 24, 1916	U.S. Insular Government
6	4th Legislature	Senate	October 3, 1916	▌20 Nacionalista ▌1 Progresista	24	House of Representatives	June 6, 1916	▌75 Nacionalista ▌7 Progresista ▌2 Democrata ▌6 independent	90	October 16, 1916 – March 8, 1919	U.S. Insular Government
7	5th Legislature	Senate	June 3, 1919	▌10 Nacionalista ▌1 Democrata	24	House of Representatives	June 3, 1919	▌83 Nacionalista ▌4 Democrata ▌3 independent	90	October 16, 1919 – March 14, 1922	U.S. Insular Government
8	6th Legislature	Senate	June 6, 1922	▌4 Colectivista ▌4 Democrata ▌3 Unipersonalista	24	House of Representatives	June 6, 1922	▌35 Colectivista ▌29 Unipersonalista ▌26 Democrata ▌3 independent	93	July 21, 1922 – February 8, 1925	U.S. Insular Government
9	7th Legislature	Senate	June 2, 1925	▌7 Nacionalista ▌4 Democrata	24	House of Representatives	June 2, 1925	▌64 Nacionalista ▌22 Democrata ▌6 independent	92	July 16, 1925 – November 9, 1927	U.S. Insular Government
10	8th Legislature	Senate	June 5, 1928	▌9 Nacionalista ▌2 Democrata	24	House of Representatives	June 5, 1928	▌71 Nacionalista ▌16 Democrata ▌7 independent	94	July 16, 1928 – November 7, 1930	U.S. Insular Government
11	9th Legislature	Senate	June 2, 1931	▌7 Nacionalista ▌4 Democrata	24	House of Representatives	June 2, 1931	▌68 Nacionalista ▌13 Democrata ▌5 independent	86	July 16, 1931 – May 5, 1934	U.S. Insular Government
12	10th Legislature	Senate	June 5, 1934	▌8 Democratico ▌3 Pro-Independencia	24	House of Representatives	June 5, 1934	▌70 Pro-Independencia ▌19 Democratico ▌3 Sakdalista	92	July 16, 1934 – November 21, 1935	U.S. Insular Government

=== Constitutional Convention (1934) ===
Term	Legislature	Upper house				Lower (or sole) house				Sessions	Era
Term	Legislature	Name	Election date	Election results	Seats	Name	Election date	Election results	Seats	Sessions	Era
13	Constitutional Convention	Unicameral assembly				Constitutional Convention	July 10, 1934	▌202 nonpartisan	202	July 30, 1934 – February 8, 1935	U.S. Insular Government

=== National Assembly (1935–1945) ===
Term	Legislature	Upper house				Lower (or sole) house				Sessions	Era
Term	Legislature	Name	Election date	Election results	Seats	Name	Election date	Election results	Seats	Sessions	Era
14	1st National Assembly	Unicameral assembly				National Assembly	September 16, 1935	▌64 Democratico ▌19 Pro-Independencia ▌6 independent	89	November 25, 1935 – August 15, 1938	Commonwealth
15	2nd National Assembly	Unicameral assembly				National Assembly	November 8, 1938	▌98 Nacionalista	98	January 24, 1939 – December 16, 1941	Commonwealth
16	National Assembly of the Republic	Unicameral assembly				National Assembly	September 20, 1943	▌108 KALIBAPI	108	September 25, 1943 – February 2, 1944	Second Republic

=== Congress of the Commonwealth of the Philippines (1945–1946) and Congress of the Philippines (1946–1973) ===
Term	Legislature	Upper house				Lower (or sole) house				Sessions	Era
Term	Legislature	Name	Election date	Election results	Seats	Name	Election date	Election results	Seats	Sessions	Era
17	1st Commonwealth Congress	Senate	November 11, 1941	▌24 Nacionalista	24	House of Representatives	November 11, 1941	▌95 Nacionalista ▌3 independent	98	June 9 – December 20, 1945	Commonwealth
18	2nd Commonwealth Congress	Senate	April 23, 1946	▌8 Liberal ▌7 Nacionalista ▌1 Popular Front	24	House of Representatives	April 23, 1946	▌49 Liberal ▌35 Nacionalista ▌6 Democratic Alliance ▌8 others	98	May 25 – July 4, 1946	Commonwealth
18	1st Congress	Senate	April 23, 1946	▌8 Liberal ▌7 Nacionalista ▌1 Popular Front	24	House of Representatives	April 23, 1946	▌49 Liberal ▌35 Nacionalista ▌6 Democratic Alliance ▌8 others	98	July 5, 1946 – December 13, 1949	Third Republic
18	1st Congress	Senate	November 11, 1947	▌7 Liberal ▌1 Nacionalista	24	House of Representatives	April 23, 1946	▌49 Liberal ▌35 Nacionalista ▌6 Democratic Alliance ▌8 others	98	July 5, 1946 – December 13, 1949	Third Republic
19	2nd Congress	Senate	November 8, 1949	▌8 Liberal	24	House of Representatives	November 8, 1949	▌60 Liberal ▌33 Nacionalista ▌6 Liberal (Avelino wing) ▌1 independent	100	December 30, 1949 – December 8, 1953	Third Republic
19	2nd Congress	Senate	November 13, 1951	▌8 Nacionalista	24	House of Representatives	November 8, 1949	▌60 Liberal ▌33 Nacionalista ▌6 Liberal (Avelino wing) ▌1 independent	100	December 30, 1949 – December 8, 1953	Third Republic
20	3rd Congress	Senate	November 10, 1953	▌5 Nacionalista ▌2 Democratic ▌1 Citizens'	24	House of Representatives	November 10, 1953	▌59 Nacionalista ▌31 Liberal ▌11 Democratic ▌1 independent	102	January 25, 1954 – December 10, 1957	Third Republic
20	3rd Congress	Senate	November 8, 1955	▌8 Nacionalista	24	House of Representatives	November 10, 1953	▌59 Nacionalista ▌31 Liberal ▌11 Democratic ▌1 independent	102	January 25, 1954 – December 10, 1957	Third Republic
21	4th Congress	Senate	November 12, 1957	▌6 Nacionalista ▌2 Liberal	24	House of Representatives	November 12, 1957	▌82 Nacionalista ▌19 Liberal ▌1 NCP	102	January 27, 1958 – December 13, 1961	Third Republic
21	4th Congress	Senate	November 10, 1959	▌5 Nacionalista ▌2 Liberal ▌1 NCP	24	House of Representatives	November 12, 1957	▌82 Nacionalista ▌19 Liberal ▌1 NCP	102	January 27, 1958 – December 13, 1961	Third Republic
22	5th Congress	Senate	November 14, 1961	▌4 Liberal ▌2 Nacionalista ▌2 Progressive	24	House of Representatives	November 14, 1961	▌74 Nacionalista ▌29 Liberal ▌1 independent	104	January 22, 1962 – December 17, 1965	Third Republic
22	5th Congress	Senate	November 12, 1963	▌4 Liberal ▌4 Nacionalista	24	House of Representatives	November 14, 1961	▌74 Nacionalista ▌29 Liberal ▌1 independent	104	January 22, 1962 – December 17, 1965	Third Republic
23	6th Congress	Senate	November 9, 1965	▌5 Liberal ▌2 Nacionalista ▌1 NCP	24	House of Representatives	November 9, 1965	▌61 Liberal ▌38 Nacionalista ▌1 independent Liberal ▌1 independent Nacionalista ▌3 independent	104	January 17, 1966 – June 17, 1969	Third Republic
23	6th Congress	Senate	November 14, 1967	▌6 Nacionalista ▌1 Liberal ▌1 independent	24	House of Representatives	November 9, 1965	▌61 Liberal ▌38 Nacionalista ▌1 independent Liberal ▌1 independent Nacionalista ▌3 independent	104	January 17, 1966 – June 17, 1969	Third Republic
24	7th Congress	Senate	November 11, 1969	▌6 Nacionalista ▌2 Liberal	24	House of Representatives	November 11, 1969	▌88 Nacionalista ▌18 Liberal ▌2 independent Nacionalista ▌2 independent	110	January 26, 1970 – September 23, 1972	Third Republic
24	7th Congress	Senate	November 8, 1971	▌5 Liberal ▌3 Nacionalista	24	House of Representatives	November 11, 1969	▌88 Nacionalista ▌18 Liberal ▌2 independent Nacionalista ▌2 independent	110	January 26, 1970 – September 23, 1972	Third Republic

=== Constitutional Convention (1971) ===
Term	Legislature	Upper house				Lower (or sole) house				Sessions	Era
Term	Legislature	Name	Election date	Election results	Seats	Name	Election date	Election results	Seats	Sessions	Era
25	Constitutional Convention	Unicameral assembly				Constitutional Convention	November 10, 1970	▌320 nonpartisan	320	June 1, 1971 – November 29, 1972	Third Republic

=== Batasang Pambansa (1978–1986) ===
Term	Legislature	Upper house				Lower (or sole) house				Sessions	Era
Term	Legislature	Name	Election date	Election results	Seats	Name	Election date	Election results	Seats	Sessions	Era
26	Interim Batasang Pambansa	Unicameral assembly				Batasang Pambansa	April 7 and 27, 1978	▌150 KBL ▌13 Pusyon Bisaya ▌2 others	190	June 12, 1978 – June 5, 1984	Fourth Republic
27	Regular Batasang Pambansa	Unicameral assembly				Batasang Pambansa	May 14, 1984	▌114 KBL ▌61 UNIDO ▌8 others	200	July 23, 1984 – March 25, 1986	Fourth Republic

=== Constitutional Commission (1986) ===
Term	Legislature	Upper house				Lower (or sole) house				Sessions	Era
Term	Legislature	Name	Election date	Election results	Seats	Name	Election date	Election results	Seats	Sessions	Era
28	Constitutional Commission	Unicameral assembly				Constitutional Commission	Unelected		48	June 2 – October 15, 1986	Provisional Government

=== Congress of the Philippines (1987–present) ===
Term	Legislature	Upper house				Lower (or sole) house				Sessions	Era
Term	Legislature	Name	Election date	Election results	Seats	Name	Election date	Election results	Seats	Sessions	Era
29	8th Congress	Senate	May 11, 1987	▌10 Liberal ▌5 LnB ▌3 PDP–Laban ▌2 Nacionalista ▌1 BANDILA ▌1 NUCD ▌1 UNIDO ▌1 independent	24	House of Representatives	May 11, 1987	▌43 PDP–Laban ▌24 LnB ▌19 UNIDO ▌16 Liberal ▌11 KBL ▌87 coalitions/others ▌14 sectoral representatives	214	July 24, 1987 – May 25, 1992	Fifth Republic
30	9th Congress	Senate	May 11, 1992	▌16 LDP ▌5 NPC ▌2 Lakas ▌1 Koalisyong Pambansa	24	House of Representatives	May 11, 1992	▌86 LDP ▌41 Lakas ▌30 NPC ▌11 Koalisyong Pambansa ▌16 sectoral representatives ▌32 others	216	July 27, 1992 – June 9, 1995	Fifth Republic
31	10th Congress	Senate	May 8, 1995	▌4 Lakas ▌4 LDP ▌1 NPC ▌1 PRP ▌2 independent	24	House of Representatives	May 8, 1995	▌100 Lakas ▌25 Lakas–Laban ▌22 NPC ▌17 LDP ▌40 coalitions/others ▌16 sectoral representatives	220	June 26, 1995 – June 5, 1998	Fifth Republic
32	11th Congress	Senate	May 11, 1998	▌5 Lakas ▌4 LDP ▌1 NPC ▌1 PDP–Laban ▌1 PMP	24	House of Representatives	May 11, 1998	▌111 Lakas ▌55 LAMMP ▌15 Liberal ▌9 NPC ▌16 others ▌14 party-lists	257	July 27, 1998 – June 8, 2001	Fifth Republic
33	12th Congress	Senate	May 14, 2001	▌3 Lakas ▌2 LDP ▌1 Liberal ▌1 PDP–Laban ▌6 independent	24	House of Representatives	May 14, 2001	▌79 Lakas ▌42 NPC ▌21 LDP ▌19 Liberal ▌48 others ▌16 party-lists	256	July 23, 2001 – June 4, 2004	Fifth Republic
34	13th Congress	Senate	May 10, 2004	▌5 KNP ▌4 Lakas ▌2 Liberal ▌1 PRP	24	House of Representatives	May 10, 2004	▌92 Lakas ▌53 NPC ▌29 Liberal ▌15 LDP ▌20 others ▌28 party-lists	261	July 26, 2004 – June 8, 2007	Fifth Republic
35	14th Congress	Senate	May 14, 2007	▌2 Liberal ▌2 Nacionalista ▌2 NPC ▌2 UNO ▌1 KAMPI ▌1 Lakas ▌1 LDP ▌1 independent	24	House of Representatives	May 14, 2007	▌89 Lakas ▌44 KAMPI ▌28 NPC ▌23 Liberal ▌11 Nacionalista ▌23 others ▌53 party-lists	271	July 23, 2007 – June 9, 2010	Fifth Republic
36	15th Congress	Senate	May 10, 2010	▌3 Liberal ▌2 Lakas ▌2 Nacionalista ▌2 PMP ▌1 NPC ▌1 PRP ▌1 independent	24	House of Representatives	May 10, 2010	▌107 Lakas ▌47 Liberal ▌29 NPC ▌26 Nacionalista ▌20 others ▌57 party-lists	286	July 26, 2010 – June 6, 2013	Fifth Republic
37	16th Congress	Senate	May 13, 2013	▌3 Nacionalista ▌3 UNA ▌1 LDP ▌1 Liberal ▌1 NPC ▌1 PDP–Laban ▌2 independent	24	House of Representatives	May 13, 2013	▌112 Liberal ▌42 NPC ▌24 NUP ▌18 Nacionalista ▌14 Lakas ▌10 UNA ▌15 others ▌57 party-lists	293	July 22, 2013 – June 6, 2016	Fifth Republic
38	17th Congress	Senate	May 9, 2016	▌5 Liberal ▌2 NPC ▌1 Akbayan ▌1 UNA ▌3 independent	24	House of Representatives	May 9, 2016	▌115 Liberal ▌42 NPC ▌24 Nacionalista ▌23 NUP ▌11 UNA ▌23 others ▌59 party-lists	297	July 25, 2016 – June 4, 2019	Fifth Republic
39	18th Congress	Senate	May 13, 2019	▌4 PDP–Laban ▌3 Nacionalista ▌1 Lakas ▌1 LDP ▌1 NPC ▌1 UNA ▌1 independent	24	House of Representatives	May 13, 2019	▌82 PDP–Laban ▌42 Nacionalista ▌37 NPC ▌25 NUP ▌18 Liberal ▌12 Lakas ▌27 others ▌61 party-lists	304	July 22, 2019 – June 1, 2022	Fifth Republic
40	19th Congress	Senate	May 9, 2022	▌4 NPC ▌1 Akbayan ▌1 Nacionalista ▌1 PDP–Laban ▌1 PMP ▌4 independent	24	House of Representatives	May 9, 2022	▌66 PDP–Laban ▌36 Nacionalista ▌35 NPC ▌33 NUP ▌26 Lakas ▌10 Liberal ▌47 others ▌63 party-lists	316	July 25, 2022 – June 11, 2025	Fifth Republic
41	20th Congress	Senate	May 12, 2025	▌3 Nacionalista ▌2 PDP ▌2 NPC ▌1 KANP ▌1 Lakas ▌1 Liberal ▌2 independent	24	House of Representatives	May 12, 2025	▌103 Lakas ▌31 NUP ▌31 NPC ▌27 PFP ▌22 Nacionalista ▌6 Liberal ▌34 others ▌63 party-lists	317	July 28, 2025 – present	Fifth Republic

== List of legislatures per party ==
These are at the start of every legislature. A politician may switch parties mid-term. Appointed members appear after the plus sign (+).

=== Senate ===
1916–1946
Year	NP (Note: Also formerly known as Nacionalista–Colectivista and Nacionalista Consolidado.)	Prog	Dem	Uni	Pro	LP	PF	Ind	Total
1916	20+2	1						1	24
1919	20+1	1+1	1						24
1922	11		5+2	6					24
1925	13		9+2						24
1928	17+1		5+1						24
1931	16+1		6					0+1	24
1934	15+1				7+1				24
1941	24								24
1946	14					9	1		24

1946–1971
Year	LP	NP	PF	DP	NCP	PPP	Ind	Total
1947	16	7	1					24
1949	18	4	1					24
1951	14	10						24
1953	7	13		2	1			24
1955		23			1			24
1957	2	21			1			24
1959	4	19			1			24
1961	8	13			1	2		24
1963	10	11			1	2		24
1965	9	12			1	2		24
1967	7	15			1		1	24
1969	5	17			1		1	24
1971	8	15					1	24

1987–present
Year	Lakas (Note: Known as Lakas–CMD from 1991 to 2009, Lakas–Kampi–CMD from 2009 to 2012, and Lakas–CMD again from 2012 to the present.)	LDP	LP	NPC	NP	PRP	PDP	PMP	UNA	Akbayan	Others	Ind	Total
1987			10		2		3				▌1 LnB ▌2 BANDILA ▌1 NUCD ▌1 UNIDO	1	24
1992	2	16	1	5									24
1995	5	14		2	1	1						1	24
1998	9	7		2		1	1	1				2	24
2001	7	2	1				2				▌6 LAMP	6	24
2004	7	1	4			1	1				▌6 KNP ▌1 Aksyon	2	24
2007	4	2	4	2	3	1	1	2			▌1 KAMPI ▌2 UNO	1	24
2010	4	1	4	2	4	1		2				5	24
2013	2	1	4	2	5	1	1		5			3	24
2016		1	6	3	3		2		3	1		5	24
2019	1	1	4	3	4		5		1	1		4	24
2022	1	1		5	4		4	1	1	1	▌1 PDDS	5	24
2025	1		1	6	4		3	1		1	▌1 KANP	6	24

=== House of Representatives ===
1907–1946
Year	NP	Prog	Dem	Pro	LP	Others	Ind	Total
1907	59	16				▌1 Catolico	4	80
1909	62	17					2	81
1912	62	16					3	81
1916	75	7	2				6	90
1919	83		4				3	90
1922			26			▌35 Colectivista ▌29 Unipersonalista	3	93
1925	64		22				6	92
1928	71		16				7	94
1931	68		13				5	86
1934				70	19	▌3 Sakdalista		92
1935				64	19		6	89
1938	98							98
1941	95						3	98
1943						▌108 KALIBAPI		108
1946	35				49	▌6 Democratic Alliance ▌3 minor parties	5	98

1949–1984
Year	LP	NP	KBL	Others	Ind	Sec	Total
1949	60	33		▌6 Liberal (Avelino wing)	1		100
1953	31	59		▌11 Democratic	1		102
1957	19	82		▌1 NCP			102
1961	29	74			1		104
1965	61	38		▌1 independent Nacionalista ▌ 1 independent Liberal	3		104
1969	18	88		▌2 independent Nacionalista	2		110
1978			150	▌13 Pusyon Bisaya ▌2 minor parties		0+14	165
1984		2	114	▌61 UNIDO	6	0+9	183

1987–present
Year	KBL	LP	NP	PDP	Lakas	LDP	NPC	PMP	Reporma	Aksyon	NUP	UNA	PFP	Others	Party-list	Ind	Total
1987	11	16	4	43										▌49 coalitions ▌24 LnB ▌19 UNIDO ▌2 GAD ▌2 PnB ▌1 LABAN ▌6 minor parties	0+14	23	214
1992	3		7		41	86	30							▌14 coalitions ▌11 Koalisyong Pambansa ▌2 minor parties	0+15	6	216
1995	1	5	1	1	100	17	22	1						▌25 Lakas–Laban ▌14 hybrid coalitions ▌9 administration coalitions ▌1 opposition coalition ▌1 PRP	0+24	7	226
1998		15			111		9	55	4	1				▌4 PROMDI ▌5 minor parties	14	2	258
2001		19		2	79	21	42	4	2	2				▌3 PROMDI ▌1 PDSP ▌1 KAMPI ▌1 PPC ▌1 NPC/LDP ▌17 minor parties ▌5 others	16	8	261
2004	1	29	2	2	92	15	53	5	1	2				▌2 KAMPI ▌1 PDSP	28	4	261
2007	1	23	11	5	89	5	28	4						▌44 KAMPI ▌3 PDSP ▌1 Lingkod Taguig	53	4	271
2010	1	47	26	2	107	2	29	6						▌1 LM ▌1 PDSP	57	7	286
2013	1	112	18		14	2	42				24	10		▌1 CDP ▌4 minor parties	59	6	293
2016		115	24	3	4	2	42			1	23	11		▌8 minor parties	59	4	297
2019		18	42	82	12	2	37	1		1	25		5	▌1 CDP ▌1 PRP ▌14 minor parties	61	2	304
2022		10	36	66	26	1	35		2		33	1	2	▌3 PRP ▌2 PDDS ▌1 CDP ▌35 minor parties	63	6	316
2025		6	22	2	103	2	31	2		3	31	1	27	▌1 PRP ▌1 CDP ▌22 minor parties	63	11	317

==== Party-list elections ====
This includes all parties that have won at least 2 seats in any election.

Party	1998	2001	2004	2007	2010	2013	2016	2019	2022	2025
APEC	2	2	3	2	1			1	1	1
Akbayan	1	1	3	2	2	2	1		1	3
Alagad	1		1	2	1					
Butil	1		2	2	1	1	1			
Bayan Muna		3	3	3	2	2	1	3		
CIBAC		1	2	2	2	2	1	2	1	1
Buhay		1	2	3	2	2	2	1		
Anakpawis			2	2	1	1	1	1		
Gabriela			2	2	2	2	2	1	1	
PM		1	2							
A TEACHER				2	2	2	1	1		
ARC				2						
AMIN		1	1	2		1	2	1		
Abono				2	2	2	2	1	1	
YACAP				2	1	1	1			
AGAP				2	1	2	1	1	1	1
Ako Bicol					3	2	3	2	2	2
Senior Citizens					2		2	1	1	1
Coop-NATCCO	1		1	2	2	2	2	1	1	1
1-CARE					2	2	1			
An Waray			1	1	2	1	1	1		
OFW Family Club						2		1		
Magdalo						2	1	1		
ACT-CIS						1		3	3	2
1-Pacman							2	2	1	
ACT Teachers					1	1	2	1	1	1
Kabayan							2		1	
Agri						1	2		1	1
PBA					1		2	1	1	
Ang Probinsyano								2	1	
Marino								2	1	
Probinsyano Ako								2	1	
1 Rider									2	1
Tingog								1	2	3
4Ps									2	2
SAGIP						1	1	1	2	1
Duterte Youth								1	1	3
Other parties	8	4	3	18	24	21	21	23	33	39
Total party-list seats	14	14	28	53	57	59		61	63	

== See also ==
- Congress of the Philippines
- Senate of the Philippines
- House of Representatives of the Philippines
