= Manila's 2nd congressional district =

Legislative district of the Philippines

- Constituency for the House of Representatives of the Philippines
- Boundary of Manila's 2nd congressional district in Manila
- Location of Manila within Metro Manila
- City: Manila
- Region: Metro Manila
- Population: 212,938 (2020)
- Electorate: 149,095 (2025)
- Major settlements: East Tondo (Barangays 147–267)
- Area: 4.08 km^{2} (1.58 sq mi)

Current constituency
- Created: 1907
- Representative: Rolan Valeriano
- Political party: NUP; Asenso Manileño
- Congressional bloc: Majority

Manila's 2nd congressional district is one of the six congressional districts of the Philippines in the city of Manila. It has been represented in the House of Representatives of the Philippines since 1916 and earlier in the Philippine Assembly from 1907 to 1916. The district consists of barangays 147 to 267 in the eastern part of the Manila district of Tondo (also known as Gagalangin), east of Dagupan Street, Estero de Vitas and Estero de Sunog Apog bordering Navotas and southern Caloocan. It is currently represented in the 20th Congress by Rolando M. Valeriano of the National Unity Party (NUP) and Asenso Manileño.

Prior to the revision of Manila's city charter in 1949, it consisted of the southern and eastern Manila districts of Ermita, Malate, Paco, Pandacan, Quiapo, Sampaloc (including the present-day Santa Mesa), San Miguel, Santa Ana (including the present-day San Andres), and Santa Cruz. Following the revision and until its second dissolution in 1972, it retained Quiapo and Santa Cruz while Binondo and San Nicolas were added to its jurisdiction. After the restoration of the Congress in 1987, it encompassed the eastern part of Tondo, which remains the case to the present.

== Representation history ==
#	Image	Member	Term of office		Legislature	Party	Electoral history	Constituent LGUs
#	Image	Member	Start	End	Legislature	Party	Electoral history	Constituent LGUs
=== Manila's 2nd district for the Philippine Assembly ===
District created January 9, 1907.
1		Fernando María Guerrero	October 16, 1907	October 16, 1909	1st	Liga Popular	Elected in 1907.	1907–1916; Ermita, Malate, Paco, Pandacan, Quiapo, Sampaloc, San Miguel, Santa Ana, Santa Cruz
2		Pablo Ocampo	October 16, 1909	October 16, 1912	2nd	Nacionalista	Elected in 1909.	1907–1916; Ermita, Malate, Paco, Pandacan, Quiapo, Sampaloc, San Miguel, Santa Ana, Santa Cruz
3		Luciano de la Rosa	October 16, 1912	October 16, 1916	3rd	Liga Popular	Elected in 1912.	1907–1916; Ermita, Malate, Paco, Pandacan, Quiapo, Sampaloc, San Miguel, Santa Ana, Santa Cruz
=== Manila's 2nd district for the House of Representatives of the Philippine Islands ===
4		Jose Generoso	October 16, 1916	June 6, 1922	4th	Demócrata	Elected in 1916.	1916–1935; Ermita, Malate, Paco, Pandacan, Quiapo, Sampaloc, San Miguel, Santa Ana, Santa Cruz
4		Jose Generoso	October 16, 1916	June 6, 1922	5th	Demócrata	Re-elected in 1919.	1916–1935; Ermita, Malate, Paco, Pandacan, Quiapo, Sampaloc, San Miguel, Santa Ana, Santa Cruz
5		Alfonso E. Mendoza	June 6, 1922	June 5, 1928	6th	Demócrata	Elected in 1922.	1916–1935; Ermita, Malate, Paco, Pandacan, Quiapo, Sampaloc, San Miguel, Santa Ana, Santa Cruz
5		Alfonso E. Mendoza	June 6, 1922	June 5, 1928	7th	Demócrata	Re-elected in 1925.	1916–1935; Ermita, Malate, Paco, Pandacan, Quiapo, Sampaloc, San Miguel, Santa Ana, Santa Cruz
6		Pedro Gil	June 5, 1928	June 2, 1931	8th	Nacionalista; Consolidado	Elected in 1928.	1916–1935; Ermita, Malate, Paco, Pandacan, Quiapo, Sampaloc, San Miguel, Santa Ana, Santa Cruz
7		Prudencio A. Remigio	June 2, 1931	June 5, 1934	9th	Liberal	Elected in 1931.	1916–1935; Ermita, Malate, Paco, Pandacan, Quiapo, Sampaloc, San Miguel, Santa Ana, Santa Cruz
(5)		Alfonso E. Mendoza	June 5, 1934	September 16, 1935	10th	Nacionalista; Demócrata Pro-Independencia	Elected in 1934.	1916–1935; Ermita, Malate, Paco, Pandacan, Quiapo, Sampaloc, San Miguel, Santa Ana, Santa Cruz
#	Image	Member	Term of office		National Assembly	Party	Electoral history	Constituent LGUs
#	Image	Member	Start	End	National Assembly	Party	Electoral history	Constituent LGUs
=== Manila's 2nd district for the National Assembly (Commonwealth of the Philippines) ===
(6)		Pedro Gil	September 16, 1935	December 30, 1941	1st	Nacionalista; Demócrata Pro-Independencia	Elected in 1935.	1935–1941; Ermita, Malate, Paco, Pandacan, Quiapo, Sampaloc, San Miguel, Santa Ana, Santa Cruz
(6)		Pedro Gil	September 16, 1935	December 30, 1941	2nd	Nacionalista	Re-elected in 1938.	1935–1941; Ermita, Malate, Paco, Pandacan, Quiapo, Sampaloc, San Miguel, Santa Ana, Santa Cruz
District dissolved into the two-seat Manila's at-large district for the National Assembly (Second Philippine Republic).
#	Image	Member	Term of office		Common wealth Congress	Party	Electoral history	Constituent LGUs
#	Image	Member	Start	End	Common wealth Congress	Party	Electoral history	Constituent LGUs
=== Manila's 2nd district for the House of Representatives of the Commonwealth of the Philippines ===
District re-created May 24, 1945.
(5)		Alfonso E. Mendoza	June 9, 1945	May 25, 1946	1st	Radical	Elected in 1941.	1945–1946; Ermita, Malate, Paco, Pandacan, Quiapo, Sampaloc, San Miguel, Santa Ana, Santa Cruz
#	Image	Member	Term of office		Congress	Party	Electoral history	Constituent LGUs
#	Image	Member	Start	End	Congress	Party	Electoral history	Constituent LGUs
=== Manila's 2nd district for the House of Representatives of the Philippines ===
8		Hermenegildo Atienza	May 25, 1946	December 30, 1949	1st	Liberal	Elected in 1946. Redistricted to the 4th district.	1946–1949; Ermita, Malate, Paco, Pandacan, Quiapo, Sampaloc, San Miguel, Santa Ana, Santa Cruz
9		Arsenio Lacson	December 30, 1949	January 1, 1952	2nd	Nacionalista	Elected in 1949. Resigned on election as Manila mayor.	1949–1972; Binondo, Quiapo, San Nicolas, Santa Cruz
10		Joaquín R. Roces	December 30, 1953	September 23, 1972	3rd	Nacionalista	Elected in 1953.	1949–1972; Binondo, Quiapo, San Nicolas, Santa Cruz
10		Joaquín R. Roces	December 30, 1953	September 23, 1972	4th	Nacionalista	Re-elected in 1957.	1949–1972; Binondo, Quiapo, San Nicolas, Santa Cruz
10		Joaquín R. Roces	December 30, 1953	September 23, 1972	5th	Nacionalista	Re-elected in 1961.	1949–1972; Binondo, Quiapo, San Nicolas, Santa Cruz
10		Joaquín R. Roces	December 30, 1953	September 23, 1972	6th	Nacionalista	Re-elected in 1965.	1949–1972; Binondo, Quiapo, San Nicolas, Santa Cruz
10		Joaquín R. Roces	December 30, 1953	September 23, 1972	7th	Nacionalista	Re-elected in 1969. Removed from office after imposition of martial law.	1949–1972; Binondo, Quiapo, San Nicolas, Santa Cruz
District dissolved into the nineteen-seat Region IV's at-large district for the Interim Batasang Pambansa, followed by the six-seat Manila's at-large district for the Regular Batasang Pambansa.
District re-created February 2, 1987.
11		Jaime C. Lopez	June 30, 1987	June 30, 1998	8th	PDP–Laban	Elected in 1987.	1987–present east Tondo (Barangays 147–267)
11		Jaime C. Lopez	June 30, 1987	June 30, 1998	9th	Lakas–CMD	Re-elected in 1992.	1987–present east Tondo (Barangays 147–267)
11		Jaime C. Lopez	June 30, 1987	June 30, 1998	10th	Lakas–CMD	Re-elected in 1995.	1987–present east Tondo (Barangays 147–267)
12		Nestor C. Ponce Jr.	June 30, 1998	June 30, 2001	11th	Liberal	Elected in 1998.	1987–present east Tondo (Barangays 147–267)
(11)		Jaime C. Lopez	June 30, 2001	June 30, 2010	12th	Lakas–CMD	Elected in 2001.	1987–present east Tondo (Barangays 147–267)
(11)		Jaime C. Lopez	June 30, 2001	June 30, 2010	13th	Lakas–CMD	Re-elected in 2004.	1987–present east Tondo (Barangays 147–267)
(11)		Jaime C. Lopez	June 30, 2001	June 30, 2010	14th	Liberal (KKK)	Re-elected in 2007.	1987–present east Tondo (Barangays 147–267)
13		Carlo Lopez	June 30, 2010	June 30, 2019	15th	Liberal (KKK)	Elected in 2010.	1987–present east Tondo (Barangays 147–267)
13		Carlo Lopez	June 30, 2010	June 30, 2019	16th	Liberal (KKK)	Re-elected in 2013.	1987–present east Tondo (Barangays 147–267)
13		Carlo Lopez	June 30, 2010	June 30, 2019	17th	PDP–Laban	Re-elected in 2016.	1987–present east Tondo (Barangays 147–267)
14		Rolan Valeriano	June 30, 2019	Incumbent	18th	NUP (Asenso Manileño)	Elected in 2019.	1987–present east Tondo (Barangays 147–267)
14		Rolan Valeriano	June 30, 2019	Incumbent	19th	NUP (Asenso Manileño)	Re-elected in 2022.	1987–present east Tondo (Barangays 147–267)
14		Rolan Valeriano	June 30, 2019	Incumbent	20th	NUP (Asenso Manileño)	Re-elected in 2025.	1987–present east Tondo (Barangays 147–267)

== Election results ==
=== 2025 ===
Candidate	Party	Votes	%
Rolan Valeriano (incumbent)	National Unity Party	59,865	52.74
Carlo Lopez	Nacionalista	53,650	47.26
Total		113,515	100.00
National Unity Party hold			

=== 2022 ===
2022 Philippine House of Representatives elections
Party	Candidate	Votes	%
NUP	Rolan Valeriano (Incumbent)	70,146	62.11
Nacionalista	Carlo Lopez	42,787	37.89
Total votes		112,933	100.00
NUP hold			

=== 2019 ===
2019 Philippine House of Representatives elections
Party	Candidate	Votes	%
Asenso	Rolan Valeriano	34,861	36.52
Nacionalista	Alex Lopez	32,215	33.75
NUP	Rodolfo "Ninong" Lacsamana	28,379	29.73
Invalid or blank votes			
Total votes		95,455	100.00
Asenso gain from PDP–Laban			

=== 2016 ===
2016 Philippine House of Representatives elections
Party	Candidate	Votes	%
Liberal	Carlo Lopez	72,409	
Invalid or blank votes		31,156	
Total votes		103,565	
Liberal hold			

=== 2013 ===
2013 Philippine House of Representatives elections
Party	Candidate	Votes	%	±%
Liberal	Carlo Lopez			
UNA	Edward Tan			
Margin of victory				
Rejected ballots				
Turnout				
Liberal hold				

=== 2010 ===
2010 Philippine House of Representatives elections
Party	Candidate	Votes	%
Liberal	Carlo Lopez	47,710	55.51
Nacionalista	Rolan Valeriano	37,141	43.21
Independent	Jaime Balmas	902	1.05
Independent	Jeffry Alacre	203	0.24
Valid ballots		85,956	92.37
Invalid or blank votes		7,097	7.63
Total votes		93,053	100.00
Liberal hold			

== See also ==
- Legislative districts of Manila
