= 1922 Makati local elections =

Local election in the Philippines

1922 Makati mayoral election
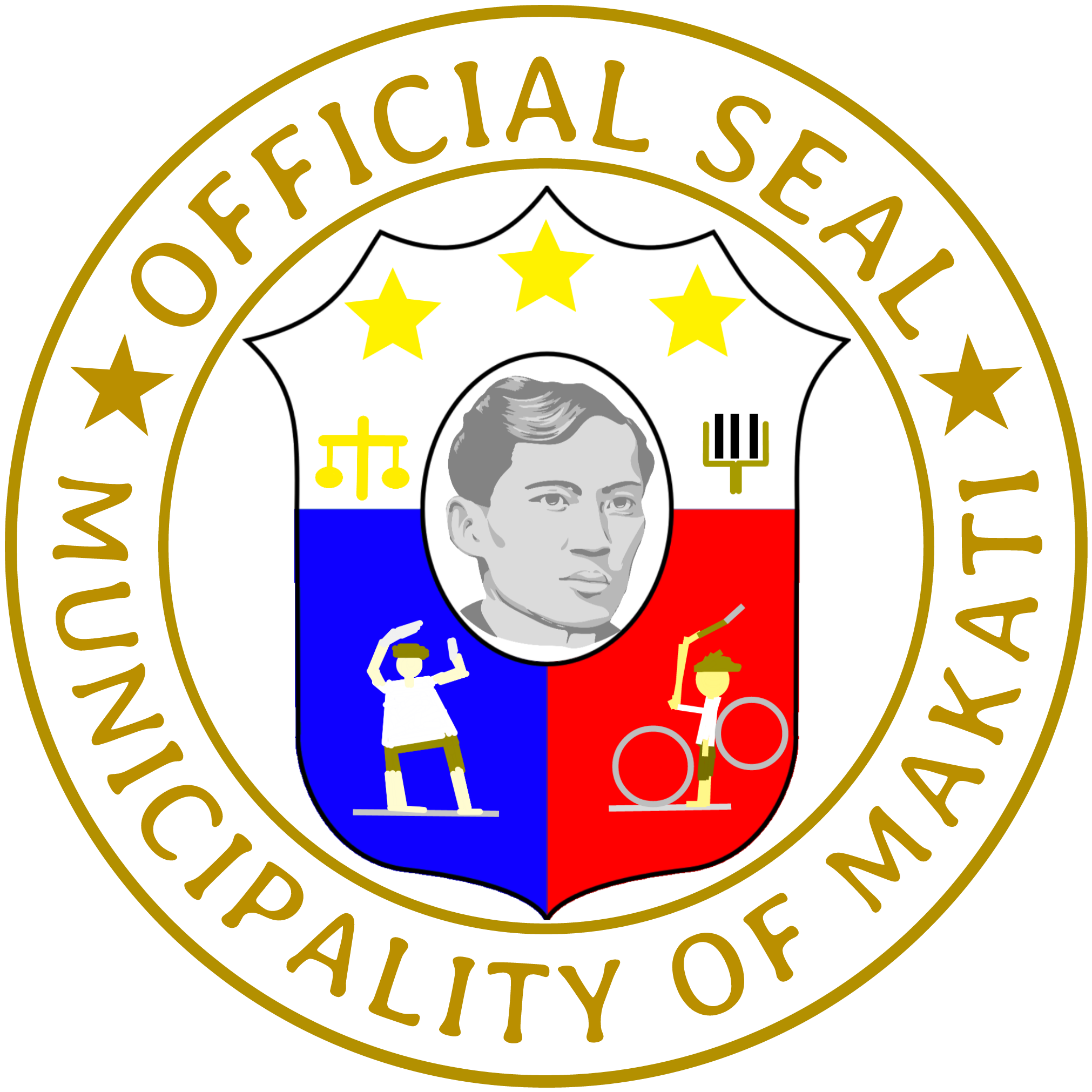
- June 6, 1922
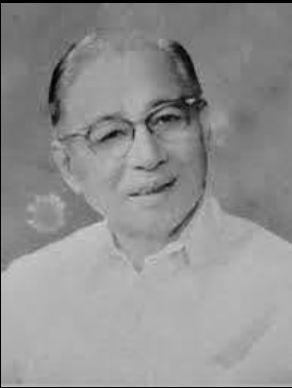

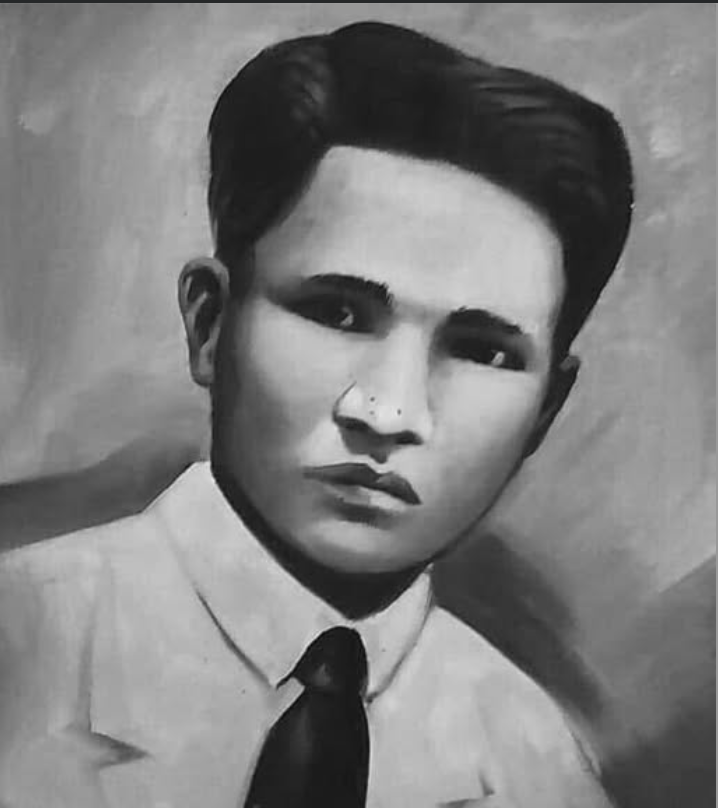
| Nominee | Nicanor C. Garcia | Ricardo Arpilleda |
| Party | Partido Democrata Nacional | Partido Colectivista |
| Running mate | Pablo C. Cortes | Igmidio Flores |
| Popular vote | 1,147 | 858 |
Mayor before election
Ricardo Arpilleda
Nacionalista
Elected mayor
Nicanor C. Garcia
Democrata
- Vice mayoral election
| Candidate | Pablo C. Cortes | Igmidio Flores |
| Party | Partido Democrata Nacional | Partido Colectivista |
| Popular vote | 1,139 | 866 |
Vice Mayor before election
Igmidio Flores
Nacionalista
Elected Vice Mayor
Pablo Cortes
Democrata

Local elections was held in the Municipality of Makati on June 6, 1922, within the 1922 Philippine local elections, under the auspices of the American Civil Government in the Philippines. This is pursuant to the Philippine Organic Act of 1902 which prescribed elections for every three years. The voters elected for the elective local posts in the town: the mayor, vice mayor, and the six-member local municipal council. The municipality of Makati was then under the jurisdiction of the 1st congressional district of the Province of Rizal. The elections for the district representatives were also held in 1922.

== Background ==
Incumbent Makati mayor Ricardo Arpilleda is running for his second term, having been elected as municipal mayor in 1919. He resigned in 1920 and was replaced by Vice Mayor Igmidio Flores. He selected Flores as his running mate. Both are stalwarts of the ruling Partido Nacionalista Colectivista.

His challenger was Nicanor C. Garcia Sr., candidate of the rival Partido Democrata Nacional. His vice-mayoral running mate was Pablo Cortes.

At the time, Philippine politics was dominated by the Nacionalistas, who were opposed by several parties, among them the Partido Democrata Nacional, Partido Reformista, and the Young Philippines Party.

== Candidates ==
=== Partido Nacionalista Colectivista ===
| Name | Party |
For Mayor
| Ricardo Arpilleda | Nacionalista |
For Vice Mayor
| Igmidio Flores | Nacionalista |

=== Partido Democrata Nacional ===
| Name | Party |
For Mayor
| Nicanor C. Garcia Sr. | Democrata |
For Vice Mayor
| Pablo C. Cortes | Democrata |

== Results ==
=== Mayor ===
Nicanor Garcia defeated former mayor Ricardo Arpilleda.

1922 Makati mayoral election
| Candidate | Party | Votes | % |
|---|---|---|---|
| Nicanor C. Garcia Sr. | Partido Democrata Nacional | 1,147 | 57.21 |
| Ricardo Arpilleda | Partido Nacionalista Colectivista | 858 | 42.79 |
| Total | | 2,005 | 100.00 |
| Democrata gain from Nacionalista | | | |
Source: Philippine Commission on Elections

=== Vice Mayor ===
Pablo Cortes won against incumbent mayor Igmidio Flores.

1922 Makati vice mayoral election
| Candidate | Party | Votes | % |
|---|---|---|---|
| Pablo C. Cortes | Partido Democrata Nacional | 1,139 | 56.81 |
| Igmidio Flores | Partido Nacionalista Colectivista | 866 | 43.19 |
| Total | | 2,005 | 100.00 |
| Democrata gain from Nacionalista | | | |
Source: Philippine Commission on Elections

=== 1922 elections for Rizal 1st District Representative ===
Partido Democrata's Andres Pascual won as 1st congressional district representative against Pedro Magsalin and two other candidates. The election for this position was held on June 6, 1922, pursuant to the Philippine Organic Act of 1902 which prescribed elections for every three years. This district holds jurisdiction over the Municipality of Makati. The winner held term from 1922 to 1925.

1922 Rizal's 1st congressional district representative election
| Candidate | Party | Votes | % |
|---|---|---|---|
| Andres Pascual | Partido Democrata Nacional | 4,348 | 28.28 |
| Pedro Magsalin | Partido Colectivista | 3,923 | 25.51 |
| Arsenio Santos | Partido Nacionalista | 3,778 | 24.57 |
| Mamerto Manalo | Partido Colectivista | 3,327 | 21.64 |
| Total | | 15,376 | 100.00 |
| Democrata gain from Nacionalista | | | |
Source: Philippine Commission on Elections

=== Municipal Council ===
There were no surviving records regarding the results for the members of the Makati Municipal Board, as most election files were destroyed during World War II.

=== Aftermath ===
Mayor Garcia will be re-elected in 1925, 1928 and 1931. He ran once again for the mayoralty post in 1937, but lost to Jose D. Villena.
