= 1925 Makati local elections =

Local elections in the Philippines

1925 Makati mayoral election
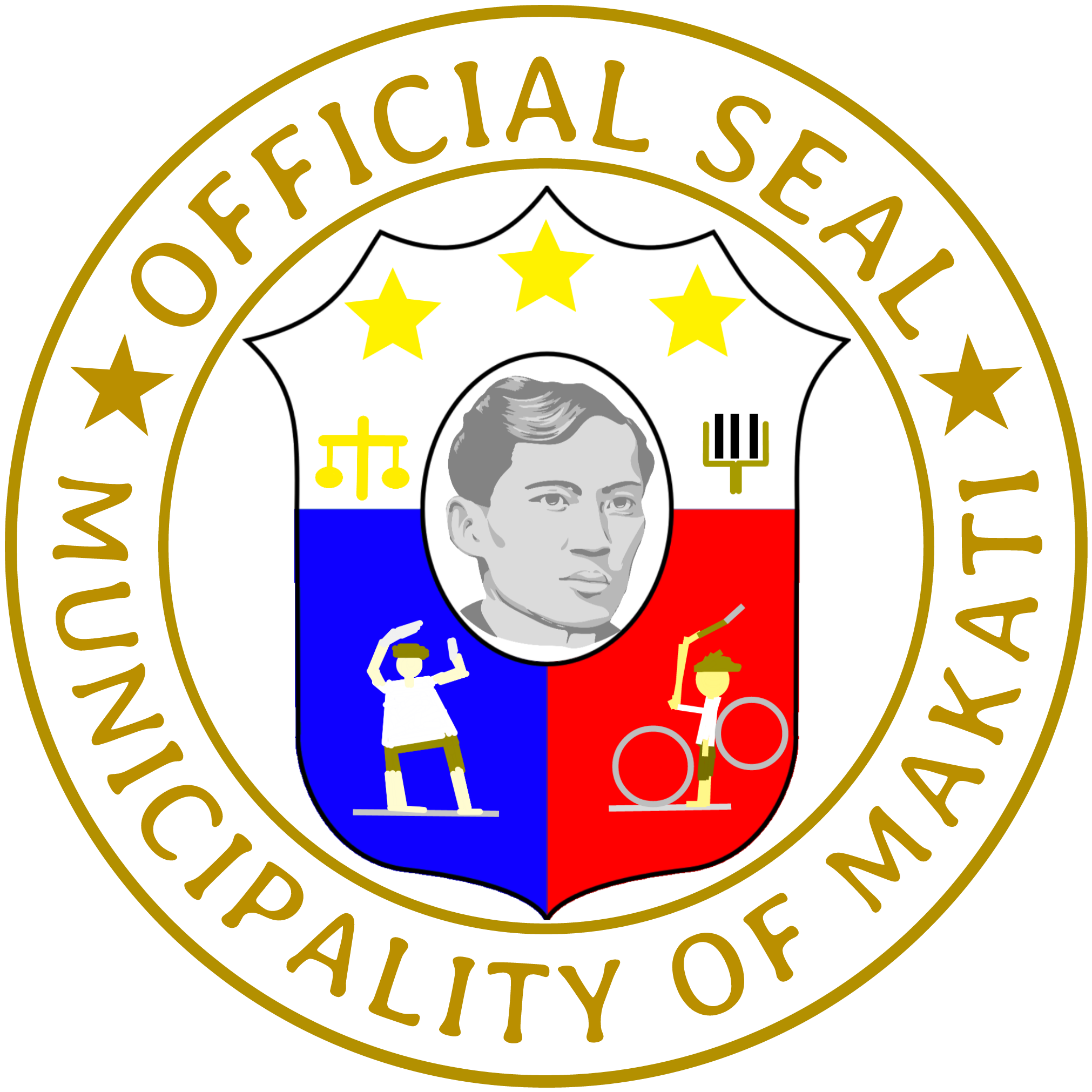
- June 2, 1925
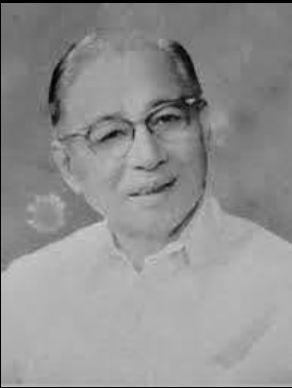

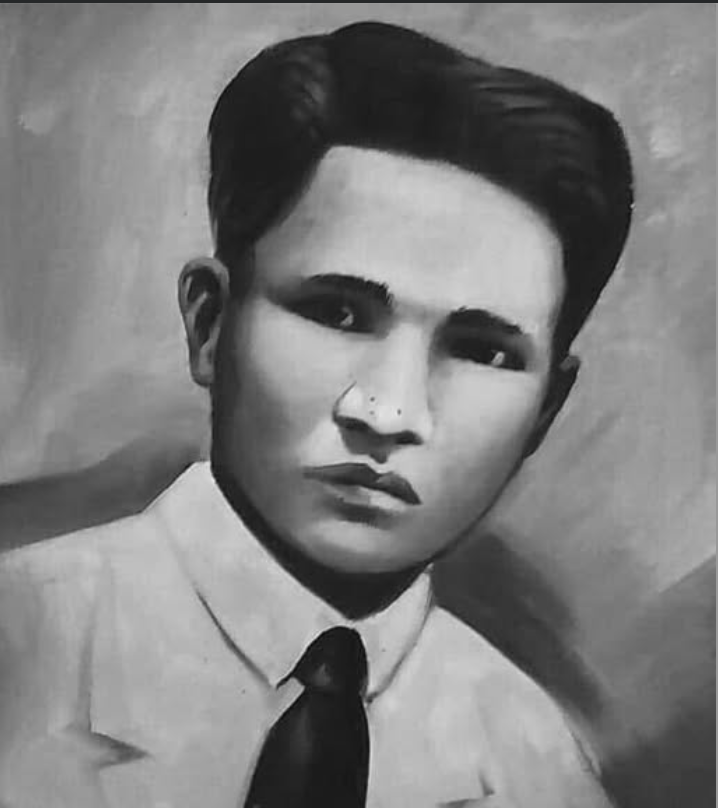
Nominee	Nicanor C. Garcia	Ricardo Arpilleda
Party	Partido Democrata Nacional	Partido Nacionalista Consolidado
Running mate	Pablo C. Cortes	Jose D. Villena
Popular vote	1,347	1,040
Mayor before election
Nicanor C. Garcia
Democrata
Elected mayor
Nicanor C. Garcia
Democrata
- Vice mayoral election

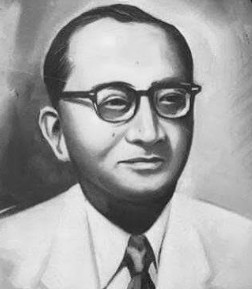
Candidate	Pablo C. Cortes	Jose D. Villena
Party	Partido Democrata Nacional	Partido Nacionalista Consolidado
Popular vote	1,329	1,058
Vice Mayor before election
Pablo Cortes
Democrata
Elected Vice Mayor
Pablo Cortes
Democrata

Local elections was held in the Municipality of Makati on June 2, 1925, within the 1925 Philippine local elections, under the auspices of the American Civil Government in the Philippines. This is pursuant to the Philippine Organic Act of 1902 which prescribed elections for every three years. The voters elected for the elective local posts in the town: the mayor, vice mayor, and the six-member local municipal council. The municipality of Makati was then under the jurisdiction of the 1st congressional district of the Province of Rizal. The elections for the district representatives were also held in 1925.

== Background ==
Incumbent Makati mayor Nicanor C. Garcia Sr. is running for his second term, having been elected as municipal mayor in 1922. He selected incumbent vice mayor Pablo Cortes as his running mate. Both are stalwarts of the ruling Partido Democrata Nacional.

His challenger was former mayor Ricardo Arpilleda, candidate of the rival Partido Nacionalista Consolidado. He served as Makati Mayor from 1919 to 1920. This was the second mayoralty contest between Garcia and Arpilleda. They have faced each other in the 1922, in which Garcia won. Arpilleda's vice-mayoral running mate was Jose D. Villena.

At the time, Philippine politics was dominated by the Nacionalistas, who were opposed by several parties, among them the Partido Democrata Nacional, Partido Reformista, and the Young Philippines Party.

== Candidates ==
=== Partido Democrata Nacional ===
Name	Party
For Mayor
Nicanor C. Garcia Sr.	Democrata
For Vice Mayor
Pablo C. Cortes	Democrata

=== Partido Nacionalista Consolidado ===
Name	Party
For Mayor
Ricardo Arpilleda	Nacionalista
For Vice Mayor
Jose Daniel S. Villena Sr.	Nacionalista
For Councilor

== Results ==
=== Mayor ===
Incumbent mayor Nicanor Garcia defeated former mayor Ricardo Arpilleda for the second consecutive election.

1925 Makati mayoral election
Candidate	Party	Votes	%
Nicanor C. Garcia Sr.	Partido Democrata Nacional	1,347	56.43
Ricardo Arpilleda	Partido Nacionalista Consolidado	1,040	43.57
Total		2,387	100.00
Democrata hold			
Source: Philippine Commission on Elections

=== Vice Mayor ===
Incumbent vice mayor Pablo Cortes won against Jose Villena Sr.

1925 Makati vice mayoral election
Candidate	Party	Votes	%
Pablo C. Cortes	Partido Democrata Nacional	1,329	55.68
Jose Daniel S. Villena Sr.	Partido Nacionalista Consolidado	1,058	44.32
Total		2,387	100.00
Democrata hold			
Source: Philippine Commission on Elections

=== 1925 elections for Rizal 1st District Representative ===
Partido Democrata's Basilio Bautista won as 1st congressional district representative against Pedro Magsalin. The election for this position was held on June 2, 1925, pursuant to the Philippine Organic Act of 1902 which prescribed elections for every three years. This district holds jurisdiction over the Municipality of Makati. The winner held term from 1925 to 1928.

1925 Rizal's 1st congressional district representative election
Candidate	Party	Votes	%
Basilio Bautista	Partido Democrata Nacional	8,930	50.39
Pedro Magsalin	Partido Nacionalista Consolidado	8,793	49.61
Total		17,723	100.00
Democrata hold			
Source: Philippine Commission on Elections

=== Municipal Council ===
There were no surviving records regarding the results for the members of the Makati Municipal Board, as most election files were destroyed during World War II.

=== Aftermath ===
Mayor Garcia will be re-elected in (1928) and (1931). He ran once again for the mayoralty post in 1937, but lost to then-incumbent mayor Jose D. Villena.
