= 1928 Makati local elections =

Local elections in the Philippines

1928 Makati mayoral election
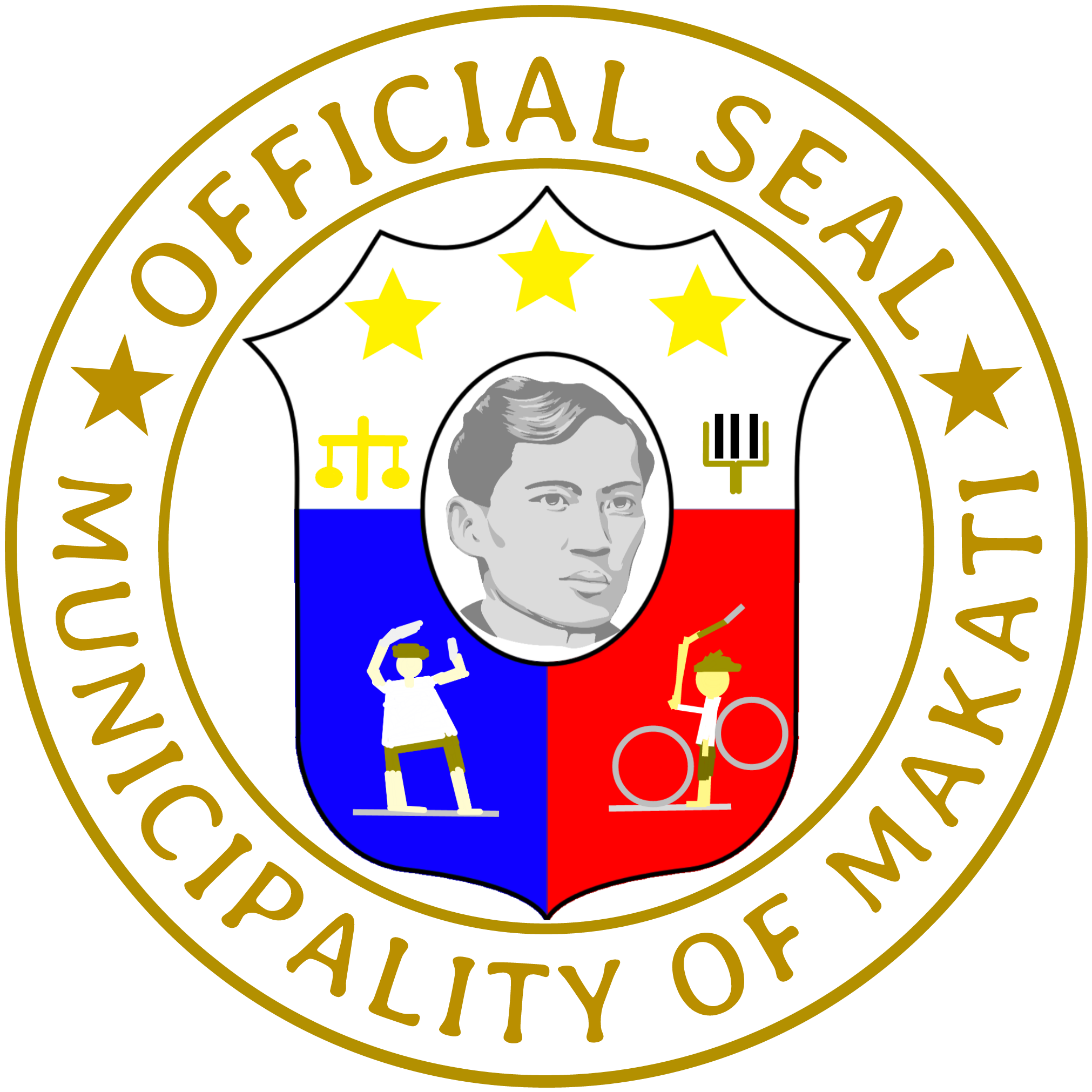
- June 5, 1928
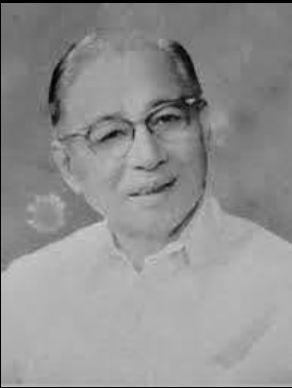

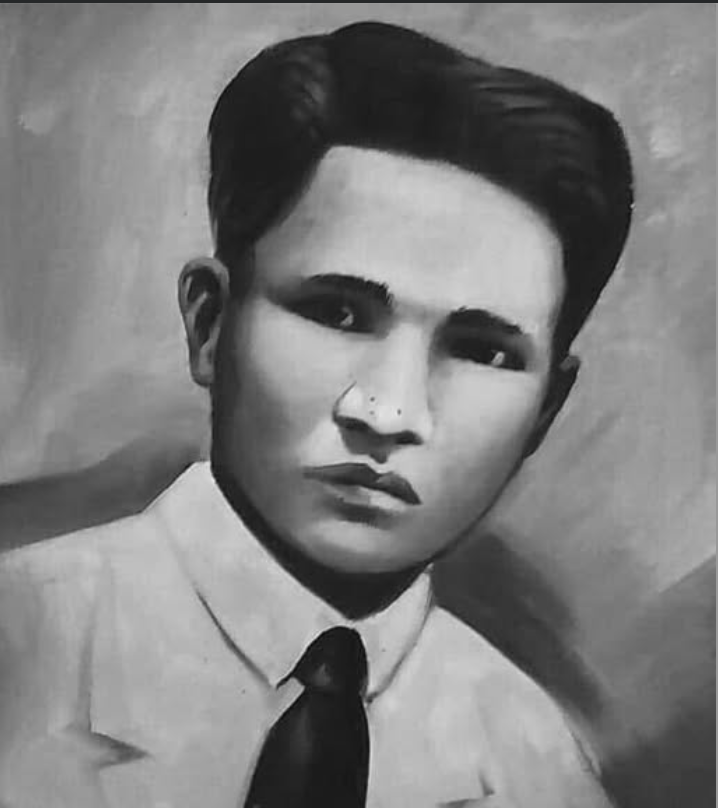
Nominee	Nicanor C. Garcia	Ricardo Arpilleda
Party	Partido Democrata Nacional	Partido Nacionalista Consolidado
Running mate	Pablo C. Cortes	Jose D. Villena
Popular vote	1,673	1,169
Mayor before election
Nicanor C. Garcia
Democrata
Elected mayor
Nicanor C. Garcia
Democrata
- Vice mayoral election

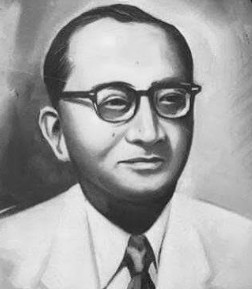
Candidate	Pablo C. Cortes	Jose D. Villena
Party	Partido Democrata Nacional	Partido Nacionalista Consolidado
Popular vote	1,743	1,099
Vice Mayor before election
Pablo Cortes
Democrata
Elected Vice Mayor
Pablo Cortes
Democrata
- Municipal Council election

6 seats in the Makati Municipal Council 4 seats needed for a majority
	First party	Second party
Party	Partido Democrata Nacional	Partido Nacionalista Consolidado
Seats won	4	2

Local elections was held in the Municipality of Makati on June 5, 1928, within the 1928 Philippine local elections, under the auspices of the American Civil Government in the Philippines. This is pursuant to the Philippine Organic Act of 1902 which prescribed elections for every three years. The voters elected for the elective local posts in the town: the mayor, vice mayor, and the six-member local municipal council. The municipality of Makati was then under the jurisdiction of the 1st congressional district of the Province of Rizal. The elections for the district representatives were also held in 1928.

== Background ==
Incumbent Makati mayor Nicanor C. Garcia Sr. is running for his third term, having been elected as municipal mayor since 1922. He selected incumbent vice mayor Pablo Cortes as his running mate. Both are stalwarts of the ruling Partido Democrata Nacional.

His challenger was former mayor Ricardo Arpilleda, candidate of the rival Partido Nacionalista Consolidado. He served as Makati Mayor from 1919 to 1920. This was the third mayoralty contest between Mayor Garcia and former Mayor Arpilleda. They have faced each other in the past two local elections in 1922 and 1925, in which Garcia won on both occasions. Arpilleda's vice-mayoral running mate was Jose D. Villena.

At the time, Philippine politics was dominated by the Nacionalistas, who were opposed by several parties, among them the Partido Democrata Nacional, Partido Reformista, and the Young Philippines Party. In the Makati local political scene, the Democratas have dominated every election since 1922.

== Candidates ==
=== Partido Democrata Nacional ===
Name	Party
For Mayor
Nicanor C. Garcia Sr.	Democrata
For Vice Mayor
Pablo C. Cortes	Democrata
For Councilor
Marcos Concepcion	Democrata
Jorge Cruz	Democrata
Felipe Juan	Democrata
Gregorio Santos	Democrata
Abundio G. Suck	Democrata
Potenciano Villanueva	Democrata

=== Partido Nacionalista Consolidado ===
Name	Party
For Mayor
Ricardo Arpilleda	Nacionalista
For Vice Mayor
Jose Daniel S. Villena Sr.	Nacionalista
For Councilor
Dionisio Afable	Nacionalista
Luis Anastacio	Nacionalista
Amado E. Diaz	Nacionalista
Tomas B. Estacio	Nacionalista
Deogracias Luciano	Nacionalista
Eliseo D. Viray	Nacionalista

== Results ==
=== Mayor ===
Incumbent mayor Nicanor Garcia defeated former mayor Ricardo Arpilleda for the third consecutive election.

1928 Makati mayoral election
Candidate	Party	Votes	%
Nicanor C. Garcia Sr.	Partido Democrata Nacional	1,673	58.87
Ricardo Arpilleda	Partido Nacionalista Consolidado	1,169	41.13
Total		2,842	100.00
Democrata hold			
Source: Philippine Commission on Elections

=== Vice Mayor ===
Incumbent vice mayor Pablo Cortes won against Jose Villena Sr.

1928 Makati vice mayoral election
Candidate	Party	Votes	%
Pablo C. Cortes	Partido Democrata Nacional	1,743	61.33
Jose Daniel S. Villena Sr.	Partido Nacionalista Consolidado	1,099	38.67
Total		2,842	100.00
Democrata hold			
Source: Philippine Commission on Elections

=== 1928 elections for Rizal 1st District Representative ===
Manuel Bernabe won as 1st congressional district representative against Pedro Magsalin. The election for this position was held on June 5, 1928, pursuant to the Philippine Organic Act of 1902 which prescribed elections for every three years. This district holds jurisdiction over the Municipality of Makati. The winner held term from 1928 to 1931.

1931 Rizal's 1st congressional district representative election
Candidate	Party	Votes	%
Manuel Bernabe	Partido Democrata Nacional	8,916	51.69
Pedro Magsalin	Partido Nacionalista Consolidado	8,334	48.31
Total		17,250	100.00
Democrata hold			
Source: Philippine Commission on Elections

=== Municipal Council ===
Four of the six winning candidates came from the Partido Democrata Nacional, while the remaining two were from the Partido Nacionalista Consolidado.

Municipal Council election at Makati's lone district
Party	Candidate	Votes	%
Democrata	Jorge Cruz	1,746	
Nacionalista	Dionicio Afable	1,689	
Democrata	Potenciano Villanueva	1,574	
Nacionalista	Amado E. Diaz	1,532	
Democrata	Gregorio Santos	1,481	
Democrata	Marcos Concepcion	1,427	
Nacionalista	Tomas B. Estacio	1,376	
Nacionalista	Eliseo D. Viray	1,318	
Democrata	Abundio G. Suck	1,267	
Nacionalista	Deogracias Luciano	1,194	
Democrata	Felipe Juan	1,107	
Nacionalista	Luis Anastacio	1,041	

=== Aftermath ===
Mayor Garcia will be re-elected to another term in 1931, which will turn out to be his last term as mayor. He ran once again for the mayoralty post in 1937, but lost to then-incumbent mayor Jose D. Villena.
