= 1931 Makati local elections =

Local elections in the Philippines

1931 Makati mayoral election
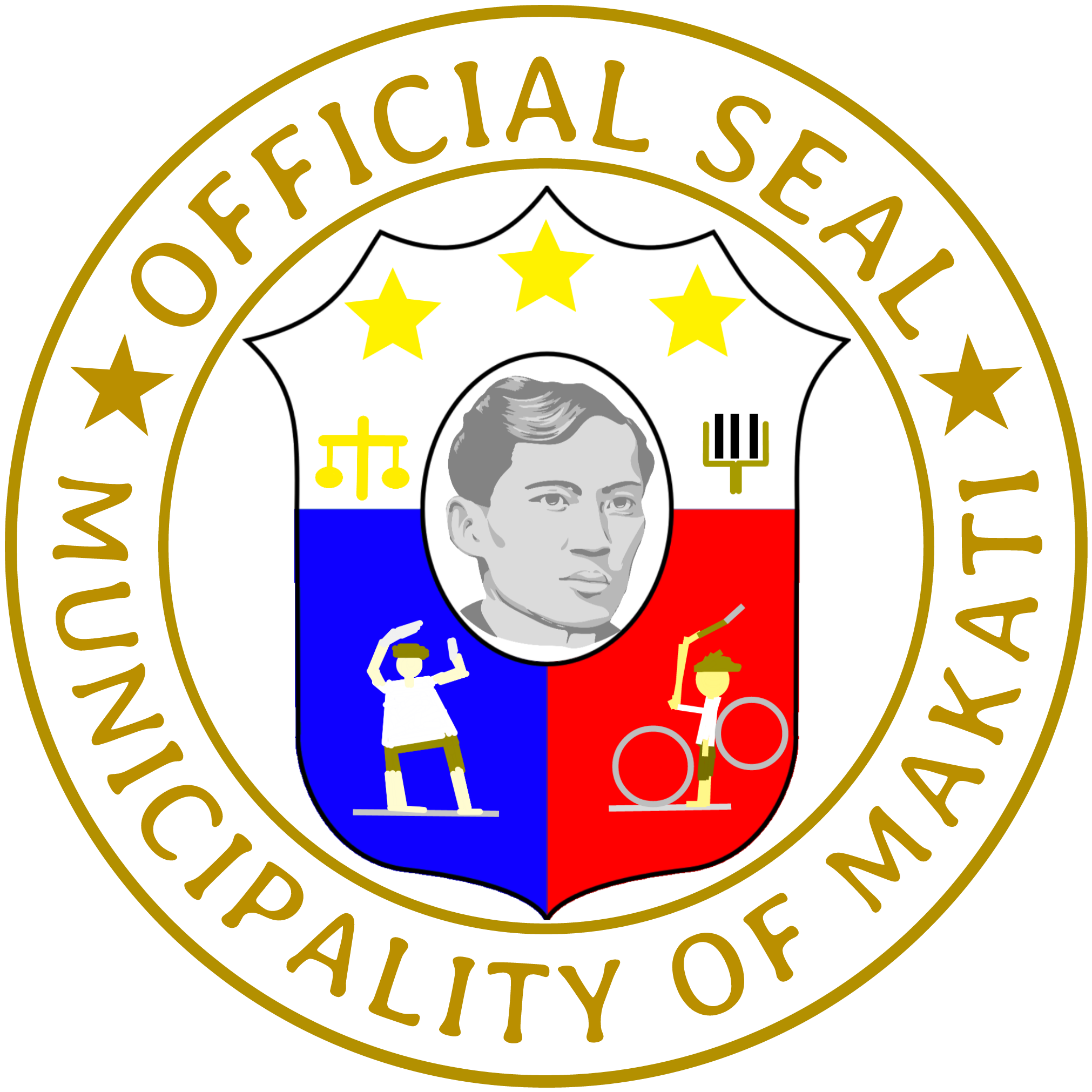
- June 2, 1931
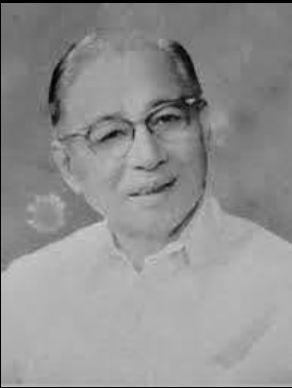

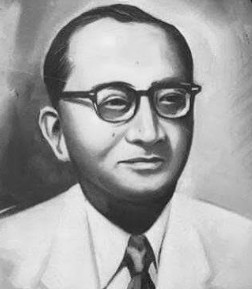
Nominee	Nicanor C. Garcia	Jose D. Villena
Party	Partido Democrata Nacional	Partido Nacionalista Consolidado
Running mate	Pablo C. Cortes	Deogracias Luciano
Popular vote	1,947	1,437
Mayor before election
Nicanor C. Garcia
Democrata
Elected mayor
Nicanor C. Garcia
Democrata
- Vice mayoral election
Candidate	Pablo C. Cortes	Deogracias Luciano
Party	Partido Democrata Nacional	Partido Nacionalista Consolidado
Popular vote	1,907	1,477
Vice Mayor before election
Pablo Cortes
Democrata
Elected Vice Mayor
Pablo Cortes
Democrata
- Municipal Council election

6 seats in the Makati Municipal Council 4 seats needed for a majority
	First party	Second party
Party	Partido Democrata Nacional	Partido Nacionalista Consolidado
Last election	4 seats	2 seats
Seats won	4	2
Seat change	Same position	Same position

Local elections was held in the Municipality of Makati on June 2, 1931, within the 1931 Philippine local elections, under the auspices of the American Civil Government in the Philippines. The voters elected for the elective local posts in the town: the mayor, vice mayor, and the six-member local municipal council. The municipality of Makati was then under the jurisdiction of the 1st congressional district of the Province of Rizal. The elections for the district representatives were also held in 1931. This was the last local election in Makati in which the Makati Municipal Board is composed of six (6) members, plus the Vice Mayor.

== Background ==
Incumbent Makati mayor Nicanor C. Garcia Sr. is running for his fourth term, having been elected as municipal mayor since 1922. He selected incumbent vice mayor Pablo Cortes as his running mate. Both are stalwarts of the ruling Partido Democrata Nacional.

His challenger for mayor was Jose D. Villena, candidate of the rival Partido Nacionalista Consolidado. He ran unsuccessfully for Makati vice mayor in 1925 and 1928. His vice-mayoral running mate was Deogracias Luciano.

At the time, Philippine politics was dominated by the Nacionalistas, who were opposed by several parties, among them the Partido Democrata Nacional, Partido Reformista, and the Young Philippines Party. In the Makati local political scene, the Democratas have dominated every election since 1922.

== Candidates ==
=== Partido Democrata Nacional ===
Name	Party
For Mayor
Nicanor C. Garcia Sr.	Democrata
For Vice Mayor
Pablo C. Cortes	Democrata
For Councilor
Marcos Concepcion	Democrata
Jorge Cruz	Democrata
Felipe Juan	Democrata
Gregorio Santos	Democrata
Abundio G. Suck	Democrata
Potenciano Villanueva	Democrata

=== Partido Nacionalista Consolidado ===
Name	Party
For Mayor
Jose Daniel S. Villena Sr.	Nacionalista
For Vice Mayor
Deogracias Luciano	Nacionalista
For Councilor
Dionisio Afable	Nacionalista
Luis Anastacio	Nacionalista
Felix Blanco	Nacionalista
Amado E. Diaz	Nacionalista
Tomas B. Estacio	Nacionalista
Eliseo D. Viray	Nacionalista

== Results ==
=== Mayor ===
Incumbent mayor Nicanor Garcia defeated Jose D. Villena.

1931 Makati mayoral election
Candidate	Party	Votes	%
Nicanor C. Garcia Sr.	Partido Democrata Nacional	1,947	57.54
Jose Daniel S. Villena Sr.	Partido Nacionalista Consolidado	1,437	42.46
Total		3,384	100.00
Democrata hold			
Source: Philippine Commission on Elections

=== Vice Mayor ===
Incumbent vice mayor Pablo Cortes won against Deogracias Luciano.

1931 Makati vice mayoral election
Candidate	Party	Votes	%
Pablo C. Cortes	Partido Democrata Nacional	1,907	56.35
Deogracias Luciano	Partido Nacionalista Consolidado	1,477	43.65
Total		3,384	100.00
Democrata hold			
Source: Philippine Commission on Elections

=== 1931 elections for Rizal 1st District Representative ===
Pedro Magsalin won as 1st congressional district representative against two other contenders. The election for this position was held on June 2, 1931. This district holds jurisdiction over the Municipality of Makati. The winner held term from 1931 to 1934.

1931 Rizal's 1st congressional district representative election
Candidate	Party	Votes	%
Pedro Magsalin	Partido Nacionalista Consolidado	10,802	49.97
Andres Pascual	Partido Democrata Nacional	6,209	28.72
Miguel Cornejo	Partido Reformista	4,606	21.31
Total		21,617	100.00
Nacionalista gain on Democrata			
Source: Philippine Commission on Elections

=== Municipal Council ===
Four of the six winning candidates came from the Partido Democrata Nacional, while the remaining two were from the Partido Nacionalista Consolidado.

Municipal Council election at Makati's lone district
Party	Candidate	Votes	%
Nacionalista	Dionicio Afable	2,147	
Democrata	Jorge Cruz	1,982	
Nacionalista	Amado E. Diaz	1,764	
Democrata	Potenciano Villanueva	1,693	
Democrata	Gregorio Santos	1,481	
Democrata	Marcos Concepcion	1,356	
Nacionalista	Tomas B. Estacio	1,217	
Democrata	Abundio G. Suck	1,083	
Nacionalista	Eliseo D. Viray	947	
Democrata	Felipe Juan	861	
Nacionalista	Luis Anastacio	734	
Nacionalista	Felix Blanco	619	

=== Aftermath ===
Mayor Garcia will not run for mayor in the next election (1934), opting to run as Rizal Provincial Board Member instead. He ran once again for the mayoralty post in 1937, but lost to then-incumbent mayor Jose D. Villena.
