= 1922 legislative election =

1922 legislative elections can refer to:

- Luxembourgian legislative election, 1922
- Philippine legislative election, 1922
- Polish legislative election, 1922
