= Philippine legislative election, 1941 =

Philippine legislative election, 1941 may refer to:

- 1941 Philippine House of Representatives elections
- 1941 Philippine Senate elections
