= 1922 Philippine legislative election =

- June 6, 1922
- Senate election

11 of the 24 seats in the Philippine Senate
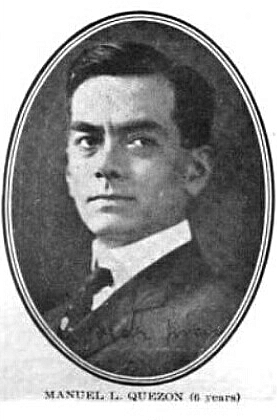

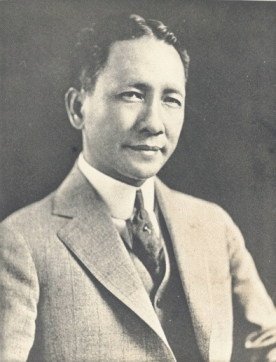
	First party	Second party
Leader	Manuel L. Quezon	Sergio Osmeña
Party	Nacionalista–Colectivista	Nacionalista–Unipersonalista
Leader's seat	5th District	10th District
Seats won	5	3
Seats after	12	6
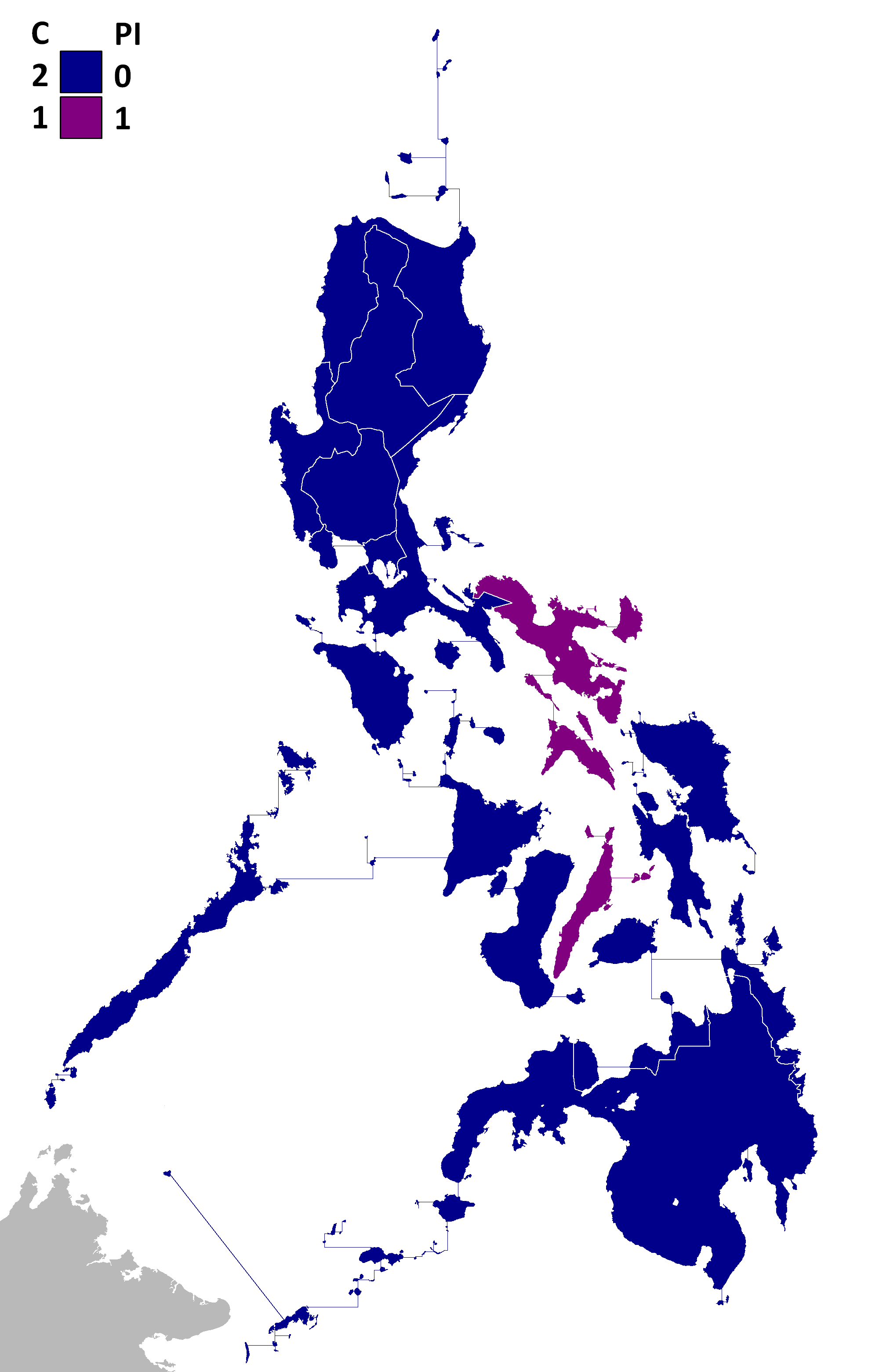
- Election results; each district sent in two seats to the Senate.
Senate President before election
Manuel L. Quezon
Nacionalista–Colectivista
Elected Senate President
Manuel L. Quezon
Nacionalista–Colectivista
- House of Representatives election

All 93 seats in the House of Representatives of the Philippines 47 seats needed for a majority
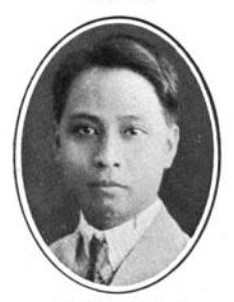

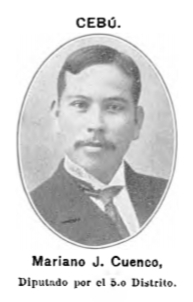

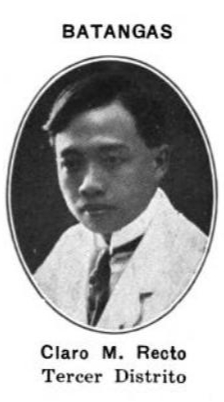
	First party	Second party	Third party
Leader	Manuel Roxas	Mariano Jesús Cuenco	Claro M. Recto
Party	Nacionalista–Colectivista	Nacionalista–Unipersonalista	Democrata
Leader's seat	Capiz–1st	Cebu–5th	Batangas–3rd
Seats won	35	29	26
Seat change	▼48	▼54	▲22
Speaker before election
Sergio Osmeña
Nacionalista Unipersonalista
Elected Speaker
Manuel Roxas
Nacionalista Colectivista

Elections to the Philippine Legislature were held on June 6, 1922 pursuant to the Jones Law of 1916 which prescribed elections for every three years. Votes elected 90 members of the House of Representatives in the Philippine House of Representatives elections; and 11 out of 24 members of the Senate in the Philippine Senate elections.

== Background ==
With Senate President Manuel Quezon and House Speaker Sergio Osmeña battled for their ambition and power, it resulted on a leadership crisis, which divides their co-founded party, Nacionalista into Collectivista (Pro-Quezon) vs Unipersonalista (Pro-Osmeña). Quezon stated that Osmeña "lead like a dictator", which the former said should not be tolerated. Also, Quezon campaigned for a "collective leadership".

Senators and representatives did separate meetings on December 16, 1921. Osmeña left his post from House speakership to gain support from colleagues. Two days later, Osmeña got the support by passing a resolution from representatives backed to support him. He also stated that he's "the de facto leader of the ruling party in government at present", which Quezon strengthen his "dictatorial leadership" narrative against Osmeña.

Governor General Leonard Wood attempted to reconcile the two, which creating a special council. But, due to its membership dominated by Unipersonalitas, Quezon resigned as Senate President on January 10, 1922. Osmeña begged Quezon to withdraw his resignation but Quezon refused. Osmeña then resigned as Nacionalista leader due to the severity of the leadership crisis.

Quezon also groomed Capiz Representative Manuel Roxas to topple Osmeña for speakership.

Even though Osmeña successfully campaigned for a Senate seat (5th district) which includes his hometown Cebu, Quezon managed to retain his Senate presidency, with Roxas snatched House speakership against Unipersonalista's Mariano Cuenco.

== Results ==
=== Senate election results ===
12	6	6
Colectivista	Democrata	Unipersonalista

Party	Seats				
Party	Up	Before	Won	After	+/−
Nacionalista (Note: The Nacionalista Party won 8 seats: 5 seats under the Colectivistas and 3 seats under the Unipersonalistas. Following the election, the Nacionalista Party has a total of 18 seats: 12 seats under the Colectivistas and 6 seats under the Unipersonalistas.)	10	20	8	18	−2
Democrata	0	1	3	4	+3
Progresista	1	1	0	0	−1
Appointed (Note: At the time of the election, the two appointed senators were from Democrata.)	0	2	0	2	0
Total	11	24	11	24	0

=== House election results ===
35	29	26	3
Nacionalista Colectivista	Nacionalista Unipersonalista	Democrata	I.

Party	Seats	+/–
Nacionalista Colectivista	35	New
Nacionalista Unipersonalista	29	New
Democrata Party	26	+22
Independent	3	0
Total	93	+3

== Popular culture ==
The election's results is featured on 2025 movie Quezon.

== See also ==
- 6th Philippine Legislature
- 1922 Philippine House of Representatives elections
- 1922 Philippine Senate elections
