= 1919 Philippine House of Representatives elections =

1st Philippine House of Representatives elections

- June 3, 1919

All 90 seats in the House of Representatives of the Philippines 46 seats needed for a majority
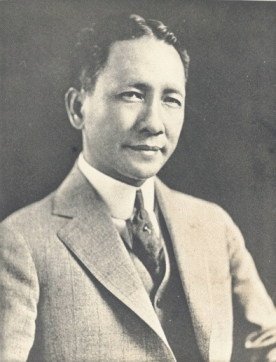

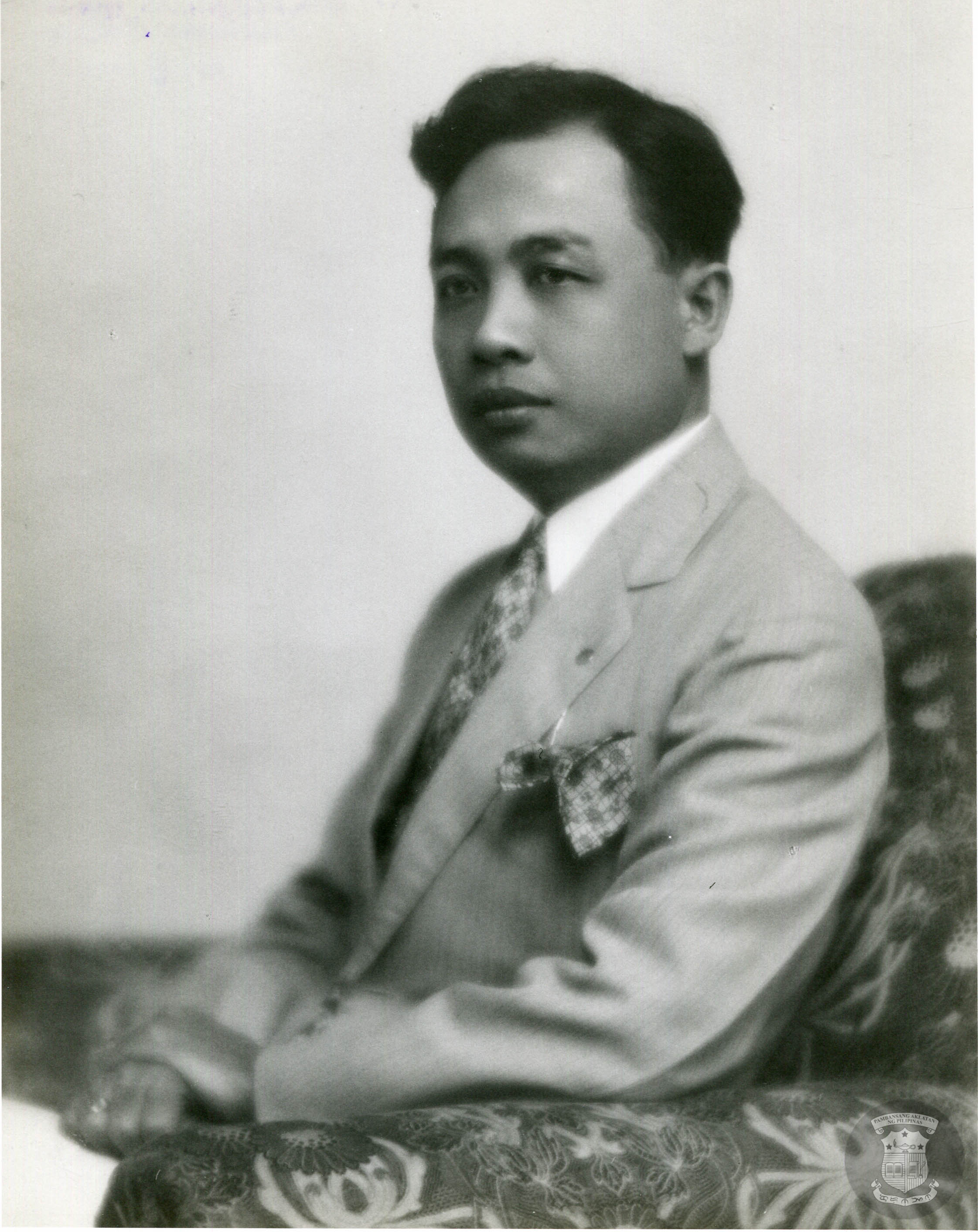
	Majority party	Minority party
Leader	Sergio Osmeña	Claro M. Recto
Party	Nacionalista	Democrata
Leader's seat	Cebu–2nd	Batangas–3rd
Seats won	83	4
Seat change	▲8	▼5
Speaker before election
Sergio Osmeña
Nacionalista
Elected Speaker
Sergio Osmeña
Nacionalista

Elections for the members of the House of Representatives were held on June 3, 1919 pursuant to the Philippine Organic Act of 1902, which prescribed elections for every three years. The ruling Nacionalista Party increased its majority from 75 seats out of 90 seats in the 1916 election to 83 out of 90 seats in this election. The elected representatives would serve in the 5th Philippine Legislature from 1919 to 1922.

== Results ==
↓

83	7
Nacionalista	Others

Party	Seats	+/–
Nacionalista Party	83	+8
Democrata Party	4	+2
Independent	3	−2
Total	90	0
