= 1931 Philippine House of Representatives elections =

5th Philippine House of Representatives elections

- June 2, 1931

All 86 seats in the House of Representatives of the Philippines 44 seats needed for a majority
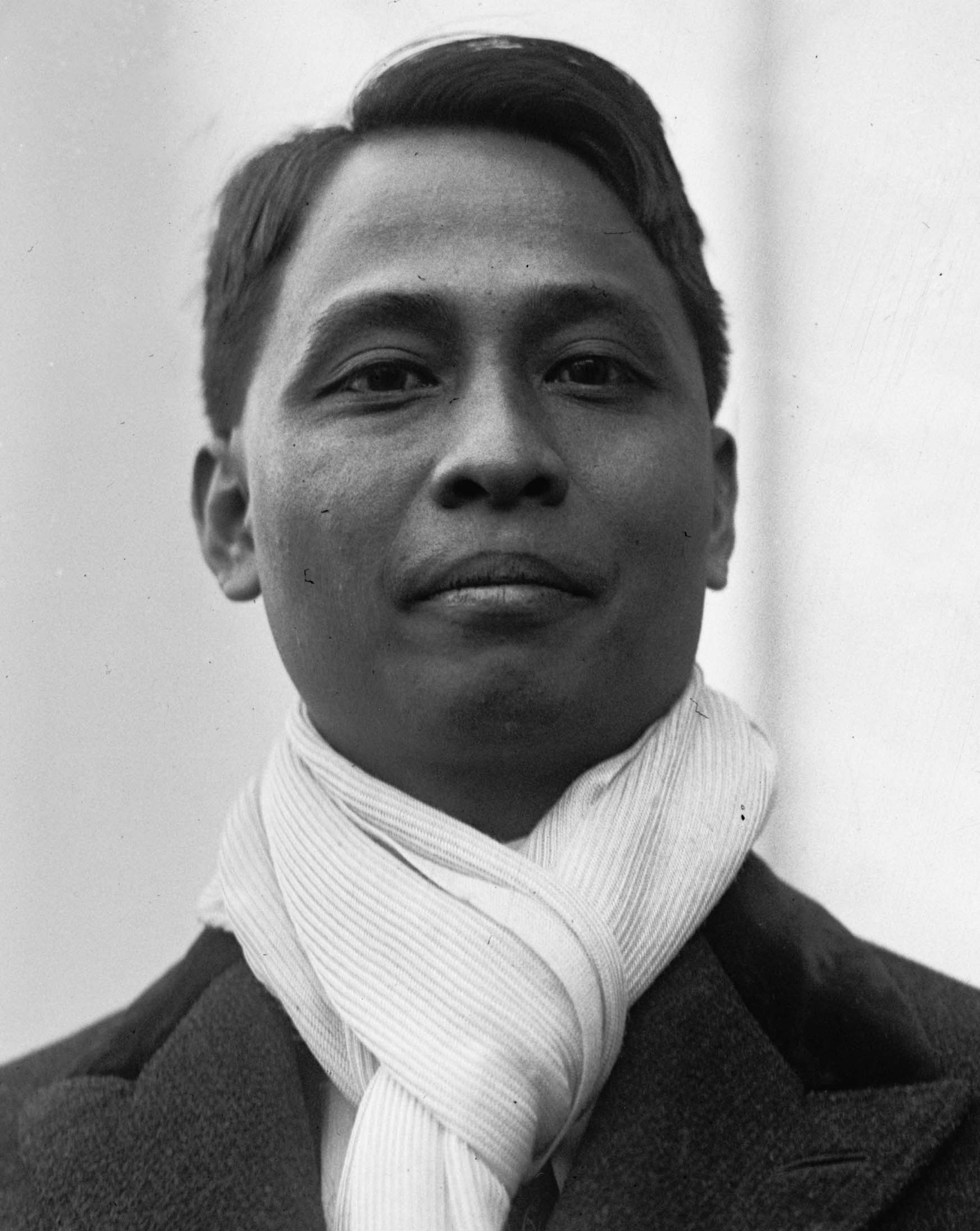

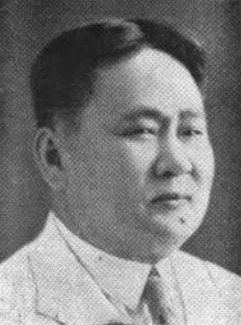
	Majority party	Minority party
Leader	Manuel Roxas	Eulogio Rodriguez
Party	Nacionalista Consolidado	Democrata
Leader's seat	Capiz–1st	Rizal–2nd
Last election	71	16
Seats won	68	13
Seat change	▼3	▼3
Speaker before election
Manuel Roxas
Nacionalista
Consolidado
Elected Speaker
Manuel Roxas
Nacionalista
Consolidado

Elections for the members of the House of Representatives were held on June 2, 1931 pursuant to the Philippine Organic Act of 1902, which prescribed elections for every three years. The ruling Nacionalista Consolidado retained their majority in the House of Representatives. The elected representatives would serve in the 9th Philippine Legislature from 1931 to 1934.

== Results ==
↓

68	13	5
Nacionalista Consolidado	Democrata	IND

Party	Seats	+/–
Nacionalista Consolidado	68	−3
Democrata Party	13	−3
Independent	5	−2
Total	86	−8
