= 1925 Philippine House of Representatives elections =

3rd Philippine House of Representatives elections

- June 2, 1925

All 92 seats in the House of Representatives of the Philippines 47 seats needed for a majority
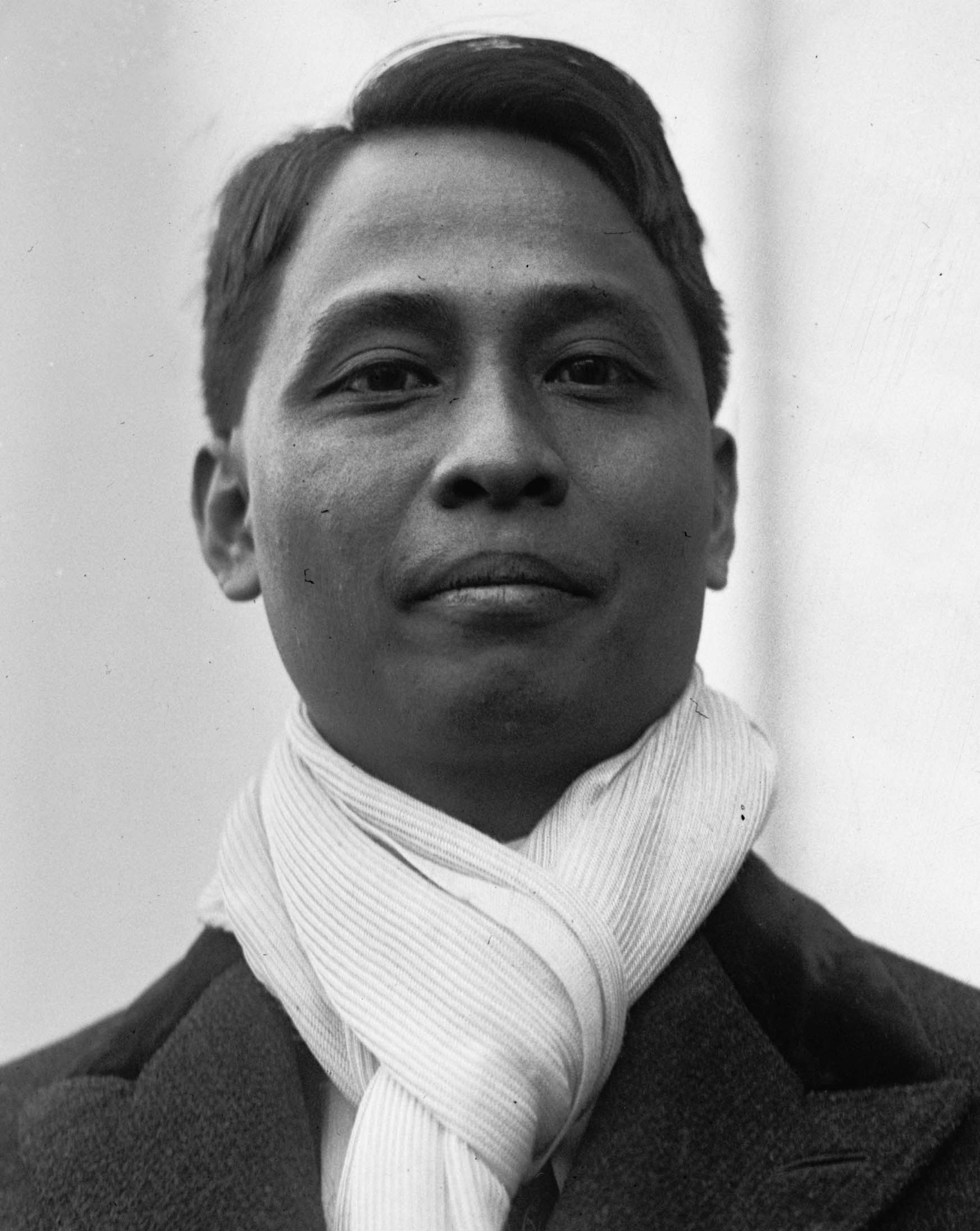

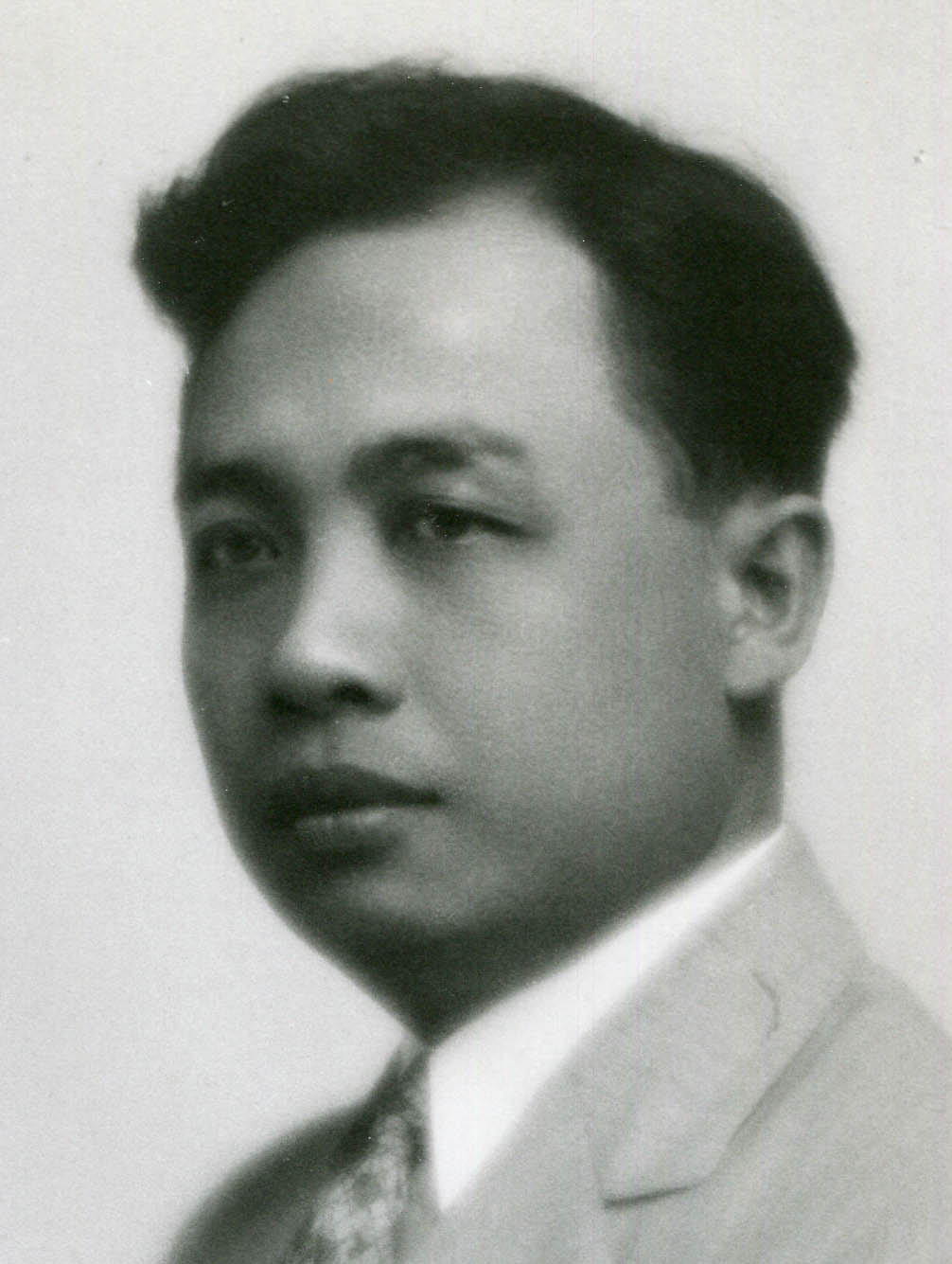
	Majority party	Minority party
Leader	Manuel Roxas	Claro M. Recto
Party	Nacionalista Consolidado	Democrata
Leader's seat	Capiz–1st	Batangas–3rd
Seats won	64	22
Seat change	Steady	▼4
Speaker before election
Manuel Roxas
Nacionalista
Colectivista
Elected Speaker
Manuel Roxas
Nacionalista
Consolidado

Elections for the members of the House of Representatives were held on June 2, 1925 pursuant to the Philippine Organic Act of 1902 which prescribed elections for every three years. The ruling Nacionalista Party, which was split into Colectivista and Unipersonalista factions in 1922, were reconciled and were named as the Nacionalista Consolidado Party. The party continued their hold of the House of Representatives retaining their number of seats from the previous election, and the majority. The elected representatives would serve in the 7th Philippine Legislature from 1925 to 1928.

== Results ==
↓

64	22	6
Nacionalista Consolidado	Democrata	IND

Party	Seats	+/–
Nacionalista Party Consolidado	64	New
Democrata Party	22	−4
Independent	6	+3
Total	92	−1
