= 1928 Philippine House of Representatives elections =

4th Philippine House of Representatives elections

- June 5, 1928

All 94 seats in the House of Representatives of the Philippines 48 seats needed for a majority
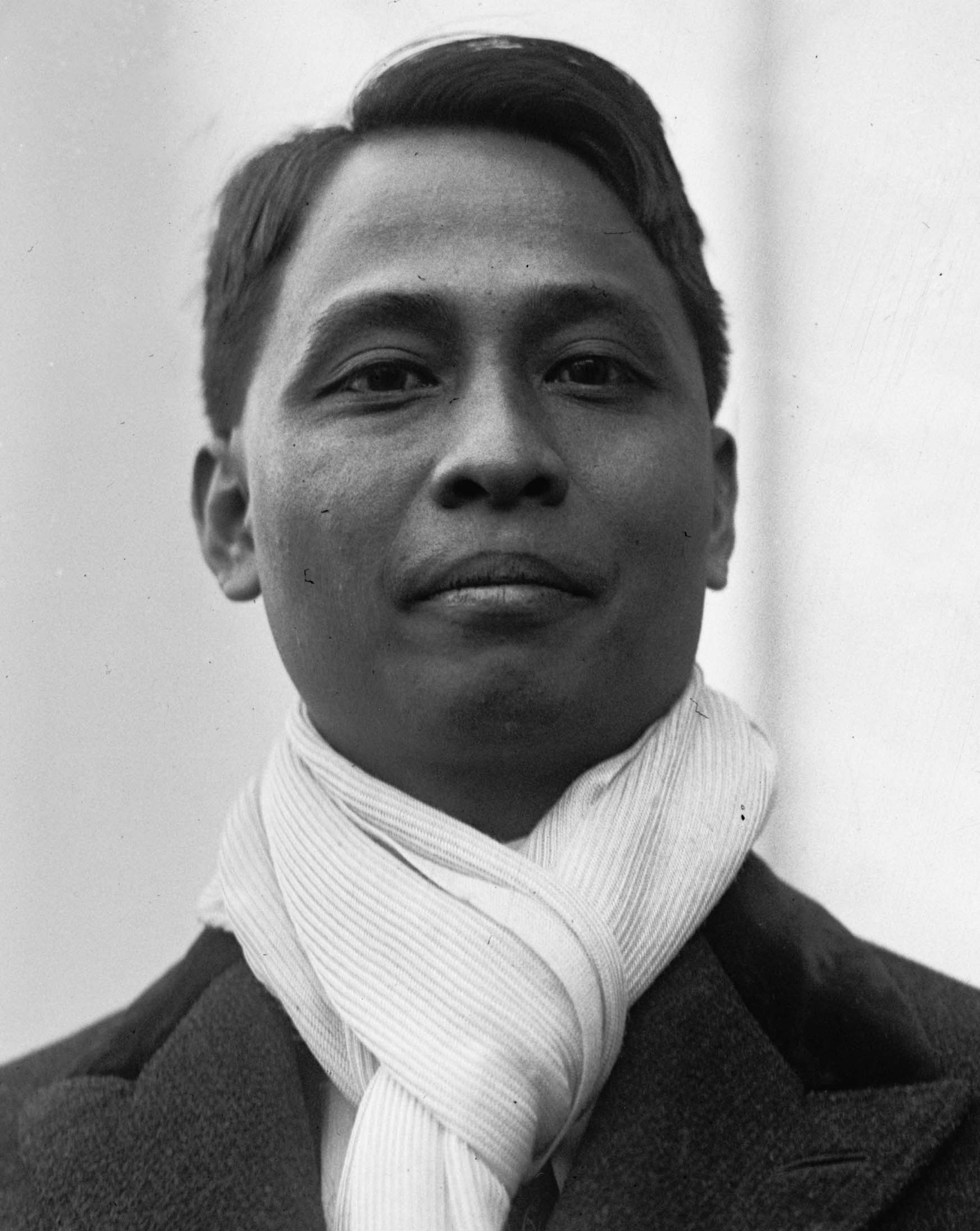

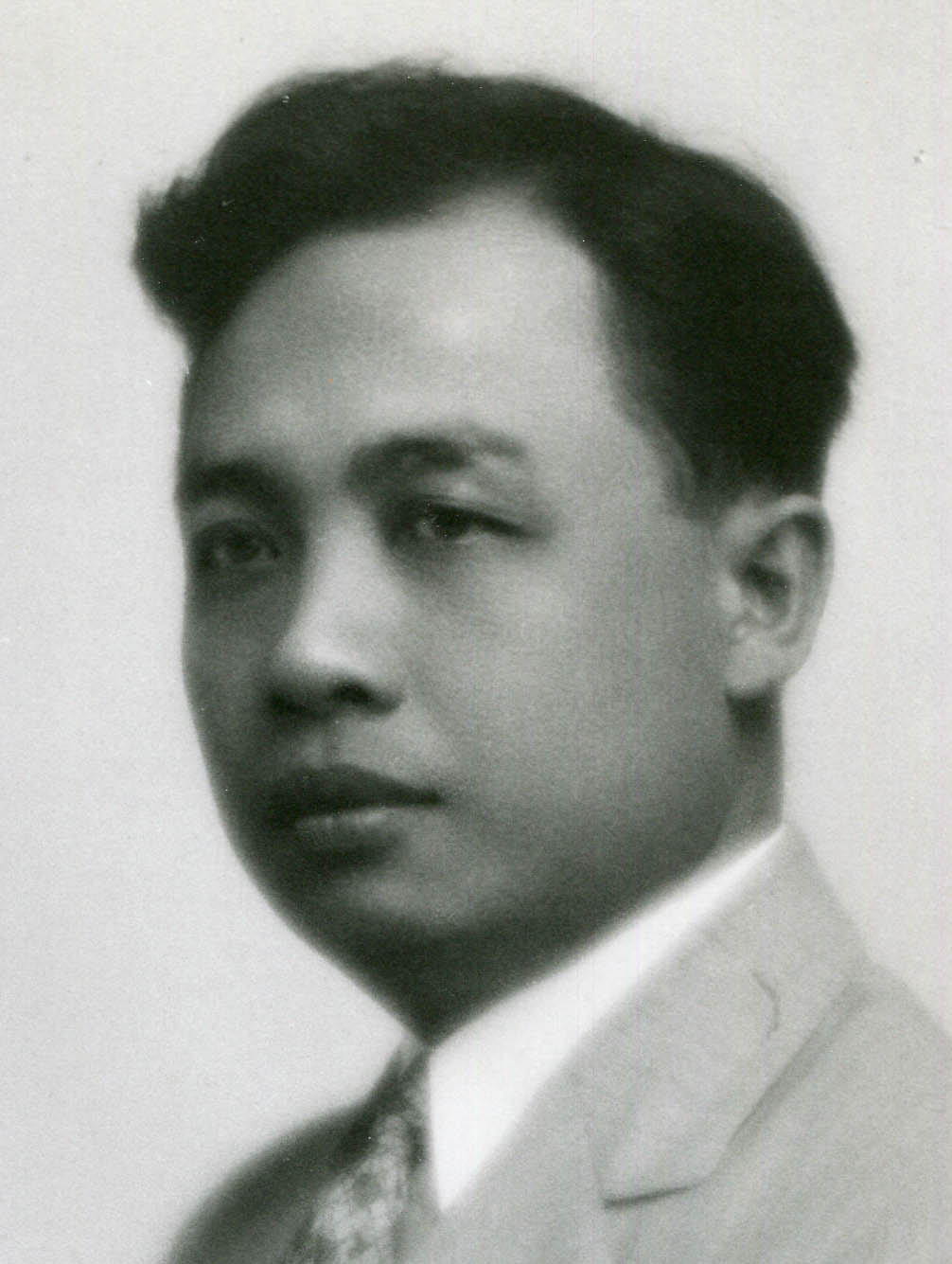
| | Majority party | Minority party |
|---|---|---|
| Leader | Manuel Roxas | Claro M. Recto |
| Party | Nacionalista Consolidado | Democrata |
| Leader's seat | Capiz–1st | Batangas–3rd |
| Last election | 64 | 22 |
| Seats won | 71 | 16 |
| Seat change | ▲7 | ▼6 |
Speaker before election
Manuel Roxas
Nacionalista
Consolidado
Elected Speaker
Manuel Roxas
Nacionalista
Consolidado

Elections for the members of the House of Representatives were held on June 5, 1928 pursuant to the Philippine Organic Act of 1902 which prescribed elections for every three years. The ruling Nacionalista Consolidado retained their majority in the House of Representatives. The elected representatives would serve in the 8th Philippine Legislature from 1928 to 1931.

== Results ==
↓

| 71 | 16 | 7 |
| Nacionalista Consolidado | Democrata | IND |

| Party | Seats | +/– |
|---|---|---|
| Nacionalista Party Consolidado | 71 | +7 |
| Democrata Party | 16 | −6 |
| Independent | 7 | +1 |
| Total | 94 | +2 |
