= 1941 Philippine House of Representatives elections =

7th Philippine House of Representatives elections

- November 11, 1941

All 98 seats in the House of Representatives of the Philippines 50 seats needed for a majority
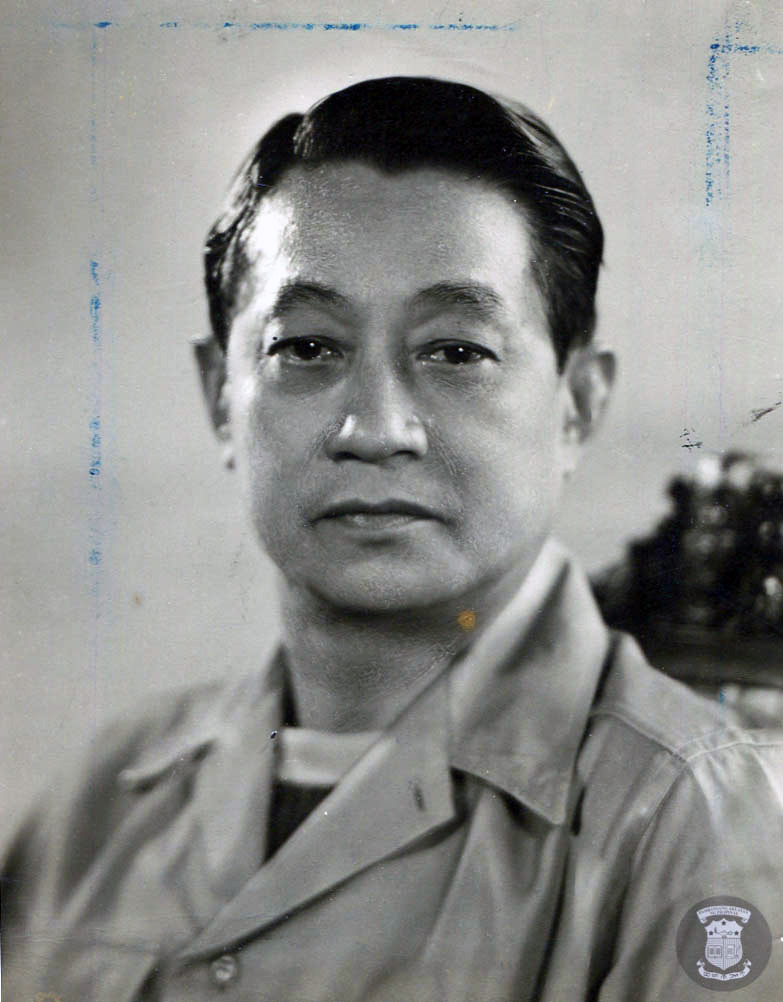

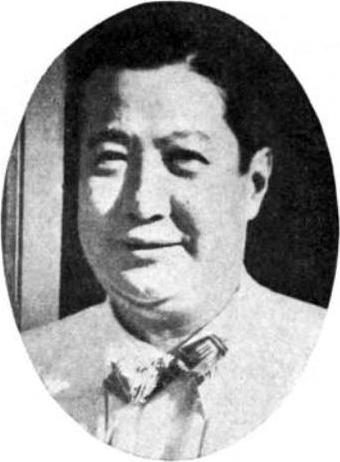
	Majority party	Minority party
Leader	José Zulueta	Engracio Clemeña
Party	Nacionalista	Popular Front
Leader's seat	Iloilo–1st	Manila–1st
Last election	98	Did not exist
Seats won	95	2
Seat change	▼3	▲2
Speaker before election
José Yulo
Nacionalista
Elected Speaker
Jose Zulueta
Nacionalista

Elections for the House of Representatives of the Philippines were held on November 11, 1941, with the ruling Nacionalista Party retaining a majority of the seats. Still, the party was prevented a clean sweep when three independents were elected. The elected congressmen were supposed to serve from December 30, 1941, to December 30, 1945, but World War II broke out and Imperial Japan invaded the Philippines on December 8, 1941, setting up a puppet Second Philippine Republic which then organized the National Assembly of the Second Philippine Republic, whose members were elected in 1943.

The Philippines was liberated by the Allied Powers in 1945 and the acts of the Second Republic were nullified; elected representatives who survived the war and were not interned for collaboration with the Japanese served until those who won in elections that were held in 1946 took office.

== Electoral system ==
The House of Representatives has at most 120 seats, 98 seats for this election, all voted via first-past-the-post in single-member districts. Each province is guaranteed at least one congressional district, with bigger provinces divided into two or more districts.

Congress has the power of redistricting three years after each census.

== Results ==
Party	Seats	+/–
Nacionalista Party	94	−4
Popular Front	2	+1
Partido Democrata Nacional	1	+1
Young Philippines	1	+1
Total	98	0
Source: Teehankee and PCDSPO

== See also ==
- 1st Congress of the Commonwealth of the Philippines

== Bibliography ==
- Paras, Corazon L. (2000). The Presidents of the Senate of the Republic of the Philippines. ISBN 971-8832-24-6.
- Pobre, Cesar P. (2000). Philippine Legislature: 100 Years. ISBN 971-92245-0-9.
