= 1922 Philippine House of Representatives elections =

2nd Philippine House of Representatives elections

- June 6, 1922

All 93 seats in the House of Representatives of the Philippines 47 seats needed for a majority
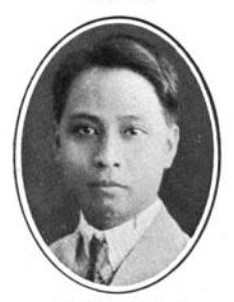

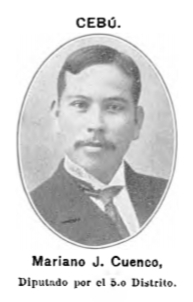

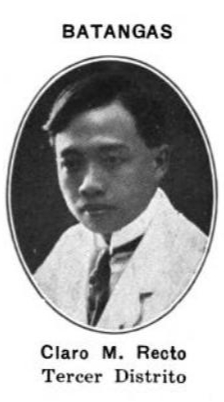
	First party	Second party	Third party
Leader	Manuel Roxas	Mariano Jesús Cuenco	Claro M. Recto
Party	Nacionalista–Colectivista	Nacionalista–Unipersonalista	Democrata
Leader's seat	Capiz–1st	Cebu–5th	Batangas–3rd
Seats won	35	29	26
Seat change	▼48	▼54	▲22
Speaker before election
Sergio Osmeña
Nacionalista Unipersonalista
Elected Speaker
Manuel Roxas
Nacionalista Colectivista

Elections for the members of the House of Representatives were held on June 6, 1922, pursuant to the Philippine Organic Act of 1902, which prescribed holding elections every three years. The ruling Nacionalista Party was split into the Colectivista (headed by Senate President Manuel L. Quezon) and the Unipersonalista (headed by outgoing Cebu–2nd Representative and former House Speaker Sergio Osmeña) factions. If combined, both blocs formed the largest party grouping in the House, with 64 of the 93 members. The Democrata Party emerged as the strongest opposition party since then Progresistas of the 1910s, winning 25 seats. The elected representatives would serve in the 6th Philippine Legislature from 1922 to 1925.

== Results ==
↓

35	29	26	3
Nacionalista Colectivista	Nacionalista Unipersonalista	Democrata	I.

Party	Seats	+/–
Nacionalista Colectivista	35	New
Nacionalista Unipersonalista	29	New
Democrata Party	26	+22
Independent	3	0
Total	93	+3

== Bibliography ==
- Dieter Nohlen; Florian Grotz; Christof Hartmann; Graham Hassall; Soliman M. Santos (15 November 2001). Elections in Asia and the Pacific: A Data Handbook: Volume II: South East Asia, East Asia, and the South Pacific. ISBN 9780199249596.
- Paras, Corazon L. (2000). The Presidents of the Senate of the Republic of the Philippines. ISBN 971-8832-24-6.
- Pobre, Cesar P. (2000). Philippine Legislature 100 Years. ISBN 971-92245-0-9.
