= Democrata Party =

Defunct political party in the Philippines

Democrata Party Partido Democrata Nacional
- Founders: Juan Sumulong
- Founded: 1917
- Dissolved: 1941
- Split from: Progresista Party
- Merged into: Nacionalista Party
- Succeeded by: Popular Front
- Ideology: Filipino independence Filipino nationalism

The Democrata Party, also known as Partido Democrata Nacional (lit. 'National Democratic Party') was a political party in the early 20th century Philippines, when the Philippines was an insular territory of the United States. It functioned as an opposition party against the ruling Nacionalista Party.

== History ==
The Democrata Party came from the remnants of the Progresista Party, which had been defeated by the Nacionalistas. Juan Sumulong founded the Democrata party in 1917, espousing "absolute and immediate independence".

In the 1922 election, the Nacionalistas were split into two camps: Senate President Manuel L. Quezon pushed for collective leadership, calling Speaker Sergio Osmeña's leadership style as "unipersonal", a charge Osmeña denied. Thus, Quezon and his allies were the "Colectivistas", while Osmeña and his allies were the "Unipersonalistas". Osmeña decided to run for the Senate, directly challenging Quezon's authority. This led to the Nacionalistas losing their majority in the House of Representatives. The Democratas, who had the balance of power, approached Osmeña for having their own senators vote for him as Senate President; in response to the Unipersonalistas voting for the Democrata's Claro M. Recto as Speaker. Osmeña refused, however, and reconciled with Quezon, thus merging the two nationalist camps into the Partido Nacionalista Consolidado (Consolidated Nationalist Party).

After the 1931 elections in June, the Democratas held a national convention to discuss the dissolution of the party in October of the same year. When the party convened again on January 31, 1932, the Partido Democrata was formally dissolved by a vote of 50 to 11.

Ironically, by 1933, Quezon and Osmeña were again at odds, this time on the issue of the Hare–Hawes–Cutting Act. The Democratas allied with Quezon and his allies, known as the "Antis", against Osmeña and his allies, who were for the law (the "Pros". The Antis won, replacing the previous Act with the Tydings–McDuffie Act, whose provisions which Sumulong had pushed for earlier as a Progresista.

By the time of the 1935 election, the Democratas were subsumed into the Antis, and later, they reunited with the Nacionalista Party. In the turn of events, another movement, the Fuente Popular (Popular Front) functioned as the opposition to the Nacionalistas moving forward. The party did not participate in the 1938 Philippine legislative election. In the 1941 Philippine general election, the party was revived albeit briefly, winning one seat (Alfredo Fausto Mendoza of the Manila South congressional district).

== Electoral performance ==
Philippine Legislative Elections
Senate election	Seats after	Outcome of election	House election	Seats after	Outcome of election
1919	1 / 24	Lost	1919	4 / 90	Lost
1922	5 / 24	Lost	1922	26 / 93	Lost
1925	9 / 24	Lost	1925	22 / 92	Lost
1928	5 / 24	Lost	1928	16 / 94	Lost
1931	6 / 24	Lost	1931	13 / 94	Lost
1941	Did not participate		1941	1 / 98	Lost
