= Philippine Organic Act =

1902 U.S. federal law

- Long title: An Act temporarily to provide for the administration of the affairs of civil government in the Philippine Islands, and for other purposes.
- Enacted by: the 57th United States Congress
- Effective: July 1, 1902

Citations
- Statutes at Large: 32 Stat. 691

Legislative history
- Introduced in the Senate as S. 2295 by Henry Cabot Lodge (R-MA) on January 7, 1902; Passed the Senate on June 3, 1902 (48-30); Passed the House on June 26, 1902 (140-97); Signed into law by President Theodore Roosevelt on July 1, 1902

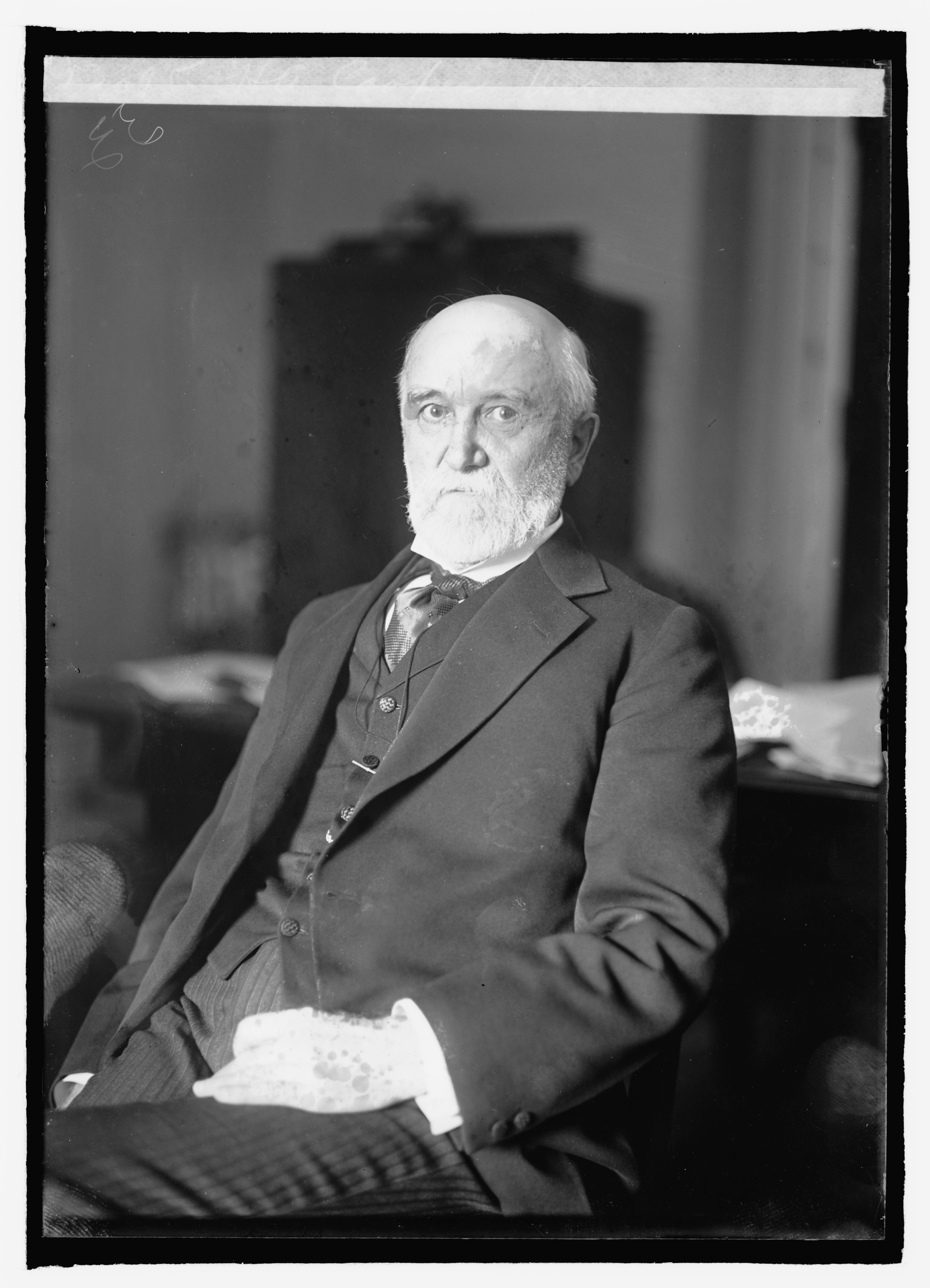
Henry Allen Cooper, the author of the Philippine Bill of 1902

The Philippine Organic Act (c. 1369, 32 Stat. 691) that was enacted by the United States Congress on July 1, 1902 was the basic law for the Insular Government. It is also known as the Philippine Bill of 1902 and the Cooper Act, after its author Henry A. Cooper.

== Overview ==
The Philippine Organic Act provided for the creation of an elected Philippine Assembly after the following conditions were met:

1. the cessation of the existing insurrection in the Philippine Islands;
2. completion and publication of a census; and
3. two years of continued peace and recognition of the authority of the United States of America after the publication of the census.

After the convening of the Assembly, legislative power shall then be vested in a bicameral legislature composed of the Philippine Commission as the upper house and the Philippine Assembly as the lower house. Supervision of the islands was assigned to the War Department's Bureau of Insular Affairs.

Other key provisions included:

- a bill of rights for the Filipinos,
- the appointment of two Filipino nonvoting Resident Commissioners to represent the Philippines in the United States Congress, and
- the disestablishment of the Roman Catholic Church.
- conservation of natural resources for the Filipinos
- exercise of executive power by the civil governor who would have several executive departments
- establishment of the Philippine Assembly to be elected by the Filipinos two years after the publication of a census and only after peace had been restored completely in the country

This act was superseded by the Philippine Autonomy Act, or the Jones Law, enacted on August 29, 1916.

== Background ==
The act was preceded by the Spooner Amendment to the Army Appropriations Act of 1901 (31 Stat. 895, 910, enacted March 2, 1901) which had provided that:

... all military, civil, and judicial powers necessary to govern the Philippine Islands ... shall until otherwise provided by Congress be vested in such person and persons, and shall be exercised in such manner, as the President of the United States shall direct, for the establishment of civil government, and for maintaining and protecting the inhabitants of said Islands in the free enjoyment of their liberty, property, and religion.

This was complemented by a cable from the Secretary of War Elihu Root to the Philippine Commission on March 5, 1901:

Until further orders government will continue under existing instructions and orders.

The comprehensive Spooner Amendment, and these instructions and orders, virtually constituted for many months the charter of government for the Philippine Islands. Between September 1900 and August 1902, the Second Philippine Commission (the Taft Commission) issued 499 laws.

== Implementation ==
The act was enacted into law on July 1, 1902, and the Philippine Commission executed its provisions. A census was conducted in 1903, and published on March 25, 1905. The Philippine Assembly elections of 1907 were held on July 30, 1907, for 80 seats, and on October 16, 1907, the 1st Philippine Legislature was inaugurated at the Manila Grand Opera House.

As a result of the act, the Catholic Church agreed to gradually substitute Spanish priests with Filipinos and to sell its land. It refused however to send the friars immediately back to Spain. In 1904, the American administration bought 166,000 hectares, a major part of the friars' holding, over half of which was in the Manila area, and the land was resold to Filipinos—some of them tenants but the majority of them estate owners.

== See also ==
- History of the Philippines (1898–1946)
- Resident Commissioner of the Philippines
