= Mayor of Makati =

Local chief executive of Makati, Philippines

- Punong Lungsod ng Makati
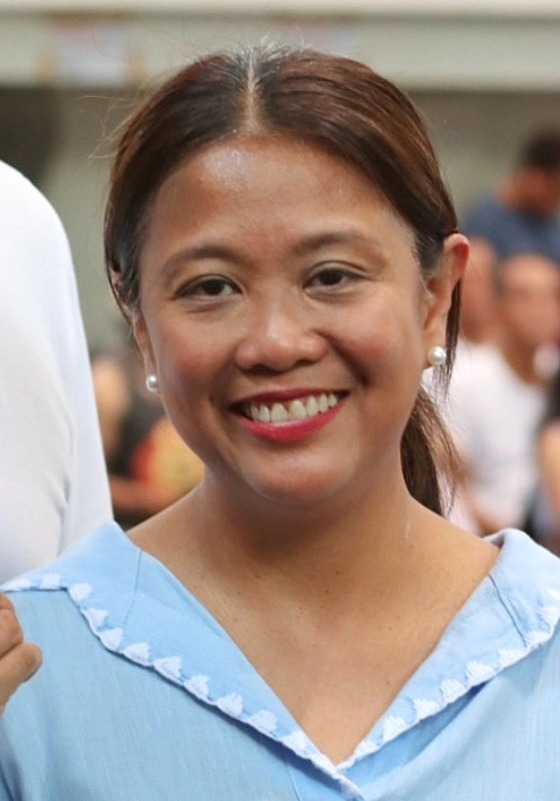
- Incumbent; Nancy Binay since June 30, 2025
- Style: Mayor (informal); Mister/Madam Mayor (informal); The Honorable (formal)
- Seat: 21st Floor, New Makati City Hall
- Appointer: Elected via popular vote
- Term length: 3 years
- Inaugural holder: Marcelino Magsaysay (as Municipal President); Nicanor F. Garcia (as Municipal Mayor); Jejomar Binay (as City Mayor)
- Formation: 1901
- Deputy: Vice Mayor of the City of Makati

The Mayor of Makati (Filipino: Punong Lungsod ng Makati) is the head of the executive branch of Makati's government. The mayor holds office at the Makati City Hall.

Like all local government heads in the Philippines, the mayor is elected via popular vote, and may not be elected for a fourth consecutive term (although the former mayor may return to office after an interval of one term) since the implementation of the 1987 Constitution of the Philippines. In case of death, resignation or incapacity, the vice mayor becomes the mayor.

The current mayor of Makati is Nancy Binay since June 30, 2025.

== History ==
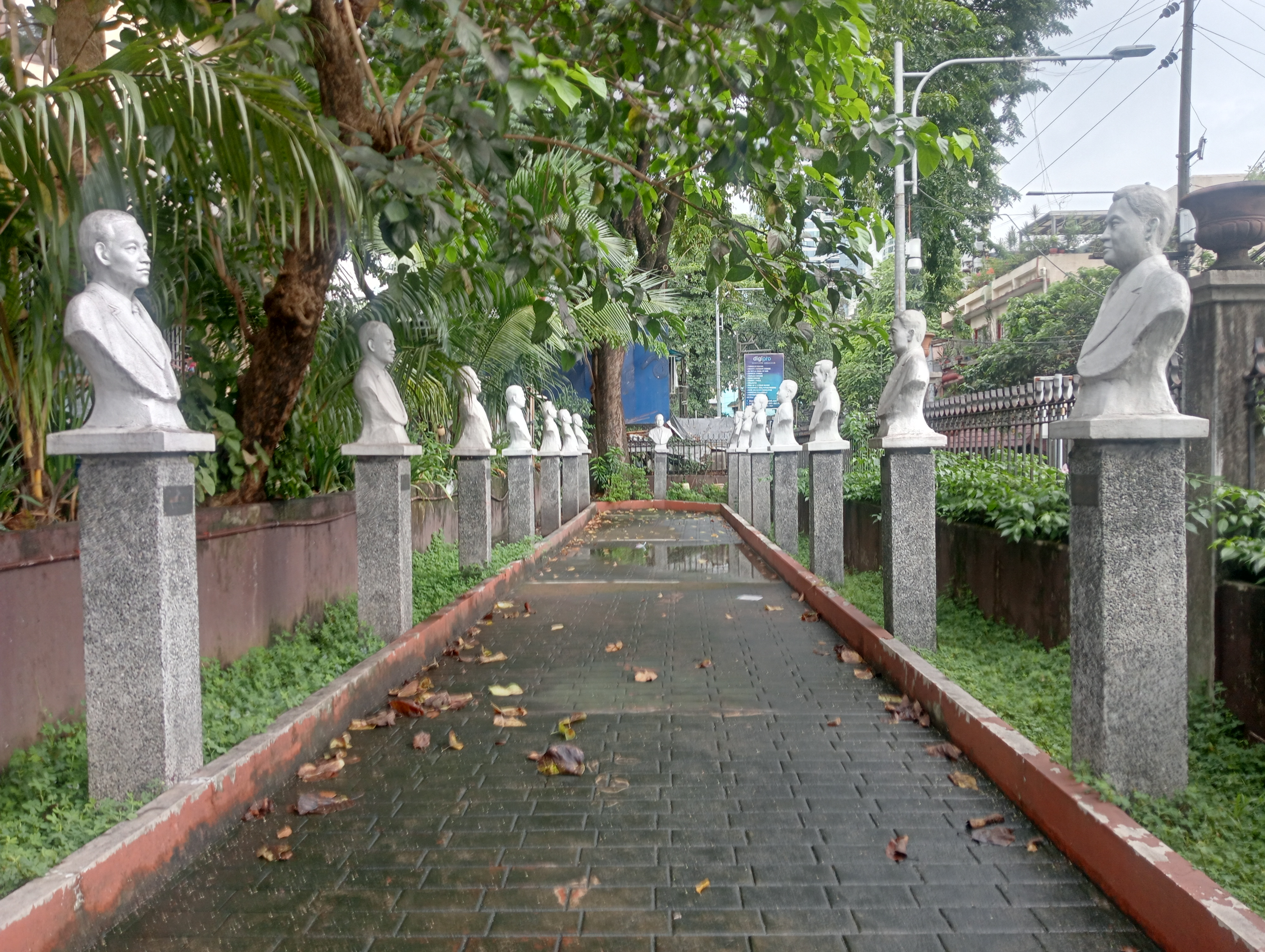
Makati Mayors Lane in Makati Poblacion Park, featuring busts of former mayors up to Jejomar Binay (center).

The position was established as municipal president in 1901, the same year when San Pedro de Macati (later renamed Makati in 1914) became part of the newly created province of Rizal. The position was redesignated as mayor in 1922, with Nicanor Garcia being the first to be elected in this capacity.

During World War II, President Manuel L. Quezon established the City of Greater Manila in 1942, which absorbed Makati and its municipal mayor became a district chief reporting to the city's Chief of the Division of Districts and of the District and Neighborhood Association. Makati Mayors Jose D. Villena and his successor, Pablo Cortez, served in this capacity. The City of Greater Manila was abolished on August 1, 1945, restoring Makati’s municipal status and the position of its mayor.

Most of the municipal presidents or mayors were residents of Poblacion namely: Eusebio Arpilleda, Hermogenes Santos, Urbano Navarro, Jose Magsaysay, Pedro Domingo, Ricardo Arpilleda, Nicanor Garcia, Jose Villena and Maximo Estrella.

In 1975, Makati was incorporated into the newly created Metro Manila. Following the 1986 People Power Revolution and the death of Mayor Nemesio Yabut, Jejomar Binay was appointed by President Corazon Aquino as Officer-in-Charge, beginning a long-standing political tenure and family grip on the mayoralty, heavily shaping the city's politics for decades. He would later serve as mayor from 1988 to 1998 (thus becoming the first city mayor when Makati attained cityhood in 1995) and again from 2001 to 2010, eventually serving as the Vice President of the Philippines. The mayoralty was later held by his wife Elenita (1998–2001) and children Junjun (2010–2015), Abby (2016–2025), and Nancy (since 2025). The family's hold on the office was briefly interrupted twice: first by Sergio Santos as acting mayor from December 1, 1987 to February 2, 1988, and later by Vice Mayor Kid Peña, who served in an acting capacity from July 1, 2015, to June 30, 2016, after Junjun Binay stepped down amid corruption allegations regarding the Makati Science High School building.

== List ==
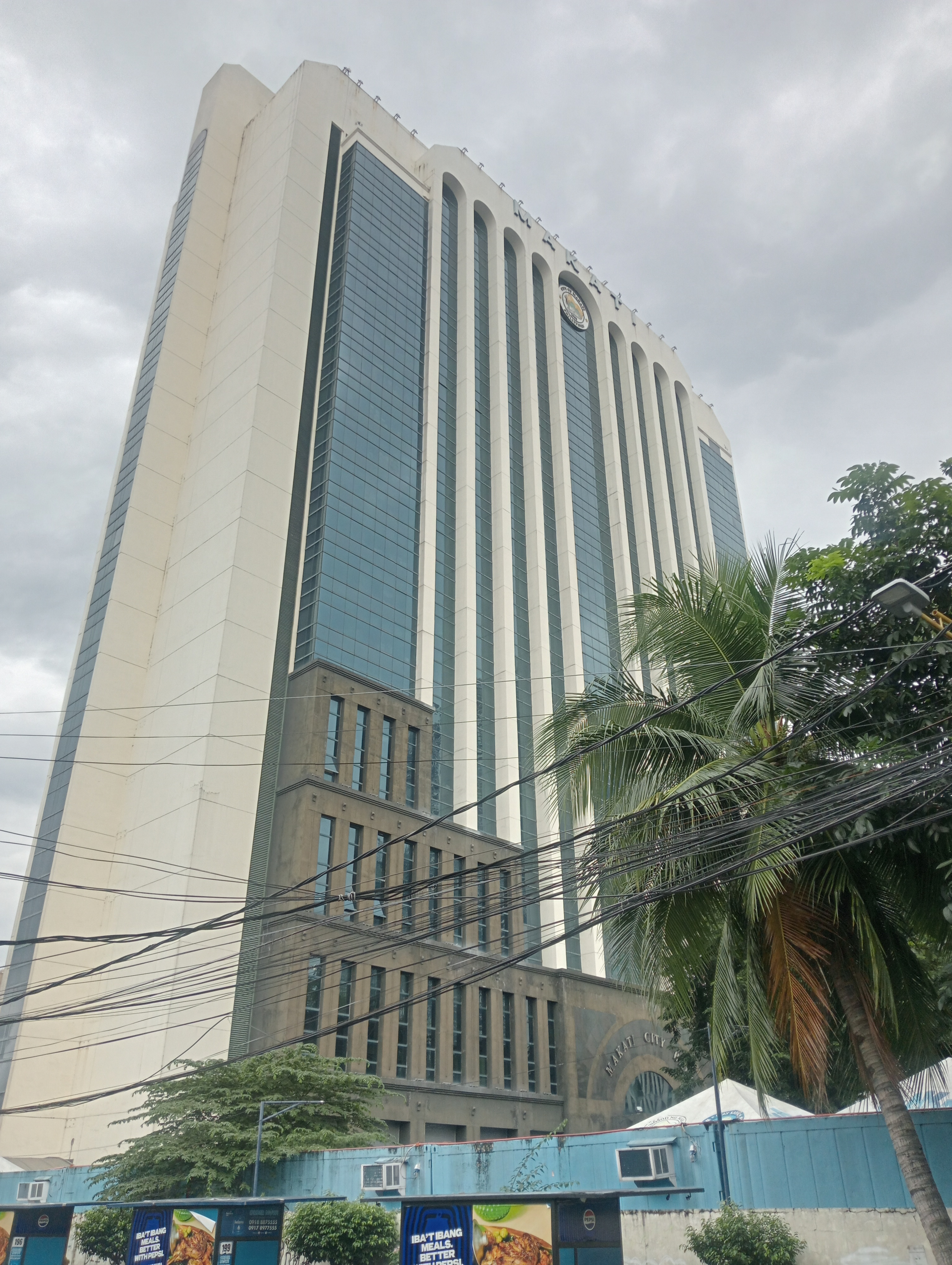
Makati City Hall, where the mayor holds office

| No. | Image | Name | Party | Term Began | Term Ended | Deputy (later Vice Mayor) |
|---|---|---|---|---|---|---|
Municipal President of San Pedro de Macati
| 1 | | Marcelino Magsaysay | | 1901 | 1903 | |
| 2 | | Eusebio Arpilleda | | 1903 | 1908 | |
| 3 | | Hermogenes Santos | | 1908 | 1911 | |
| 4 | | Urbano Navarro | | 1911 | 1913 | |
| 5 | | Jose Magsaysay | | 1913 | 1916 | |
Municipal President of Makati
| 6 | | Pedro Domingo | | 1917 | 1919 | |
| 7 | | Ricardo Arpilleda | | 1919 | 1920 | |
| 8 | | Igmidio Flores | | 1920 | 1922 | |
Mayor of the Municipality of Makati
| 9 | | Nicanor F. Garcia | Democrata | 1922 | 1934 | Pablo Cortez |
| 10 | | Jose D. Villena (Note: Concurrently served as the District Chief of Makati, when it was part of the City of Greater Manila.) | Nacionalista | 1935 | 1944 | Deogracias Luciano |
| 11 | | Pablo Cortez | Nacionalista | 1944 | 1947 | |
| 11 | | Pablo Cortez | Liberal | 1944 | 1947 | |
| 12 | | Jose D. Villena | Nacionalista | 1948 | 1954 (Note: Removed from office.) | Tomas Baluyut; Bernardo Umali |
| – | | Ignacio Babasa (Note: Served in acting capacity.) | Nacionalista | 1954 | 1954 | |
| 13 | | Bernardo Umali | Nacionalista | 1954 | 1954 | |
| 14 | | Maximo Estrella | Liberal | 1955 | 1969 | Juan Patag; Teotimo Gealogo |
| 15 | | Jose Luciano | Nacionalista | 1969 | 1971 (Note: Resigned.) | Johnny Wilson |
| – | | Cesar Alzona | Liberal | October 1971 | December 1971 | |
| 16 | | Nemesio Yabut | Liberal | January 1, 1972 | February 25, 1986 (Note: Died in office) | Johnny Wilson |
| 16 | | Nemesio Yabut | KBL | January 1, 1972 | February 25, 1986 | Johnny Wilson |
| – | | Jejomar C. Binay | PDP–Laban | February 27, 1986 | December 1, 1987 | Roberto Brillante |
| – | | Sergio Santos | | December 1, 1987 | February 2, 1988 | Roberto Brillante |
| 17 | | Jejomar C. Binay | PDP–Laban | February 2, 1988 | February 4, 1995 | Conchitina Sevilla-Bernardo (1988–89); Augusto V. Pangan Sr. (1989–92); Roberto Brillante (1992); Elena Maccay (1992); Arturo S. Yabut (1992–95) |
Mayor of the City of Makati
| 17 | | Jejomar C. Binay | PDP–Laban | February 4, 1995 | June 30, 1998 | Arturo S. Yabut |
| 18 | | Elenita S. Binay | LAMMP | June 30, 1998 | June 30, 2001 | Eduardo Manzano |
| 18 | | Elenita S. Binay | PDP–Laban | June 30, 1998 | June 30, 2001 | Eduardo Manzano |
| 19 | | Jejomar C. Binay | PDP–Laban | June 30, 2001 | June 30, 2010 | Ernesto S. Mercado |
| 20 | | Jejomar Erwin S. Binay, Jr. | PDP–Laban | June 30, 2010 | June 30, 2015 | Romulo "Kid" Peña Jr. |
| 20 | | Jejomar Erwin S. Binay, Jr. | UNA | June 30, 2010 | June 30, 2015 | Romulo "Kid" Peña Jr. |
| – | | Romulo "Kid" Peña Jr. | Liberal | July 1, 2015 | June 30, 2016 | Virgilio Hilario Sr. (acting; 2015); Leonardo Magpantay (acting; 2015–16) |
| 21 | | Mar-Len Abigail S. Binay-Campos | UNA | June 30, 2016 | June 30, 2025 | Monique Yazmin Maria Q. Lagdameo |
| 21 | | Mar-Len Abigail S. Binay-Campos | MKTZNU | June 30, 2016 | June 30, 2025 | Monique Yazmin Maria Q. Lagdameo |
| 22 | | Maria Lourdes "Nancy" S. Binay-Angeles | UNA | June 30, 2025 | Present | Romulo "Kid" Peña Jr. |

== Elections ==
- 1907 Makati local elections
- 1909 Makati local elections
- 1912 Makati local elections
- 1916 Makati local elections
- 1919 Makati local elections
- 1922 Makati local elections
- 1925 Makati local elections
- 1928 Makati local elections
- 1931 Makati local elections
- 1934 Makati local elections
- 1937 Makati local elections
- 1940 Makati local elections
- 1947 Makati local elections
- 1951 Makati local elections
- 1955 Makati local elections
- 1959 Makati local elections
- 1963 Makati local elections
- 1967 Makati local elections
- 1971 Makati local elections
- 1980 Makati local elections
- 1988 Makati local elections
- 1992 Makati local elections
- 1995 Makati local elections
- 1998 Makati local elections
- 2001 Makati local elections
- 2004 Makati local elections
- 2007 Makati local elections
- 2010 Makati local elections
- 2013 Makati local elections
- 2016 Makati local elections
- 2019 Makati local elections
- 2022 Makati local elections
- 2025 Makati local elections
