= 1937 Makati local elections =

Local elections in the Philippines

1937 Makati mayoral election
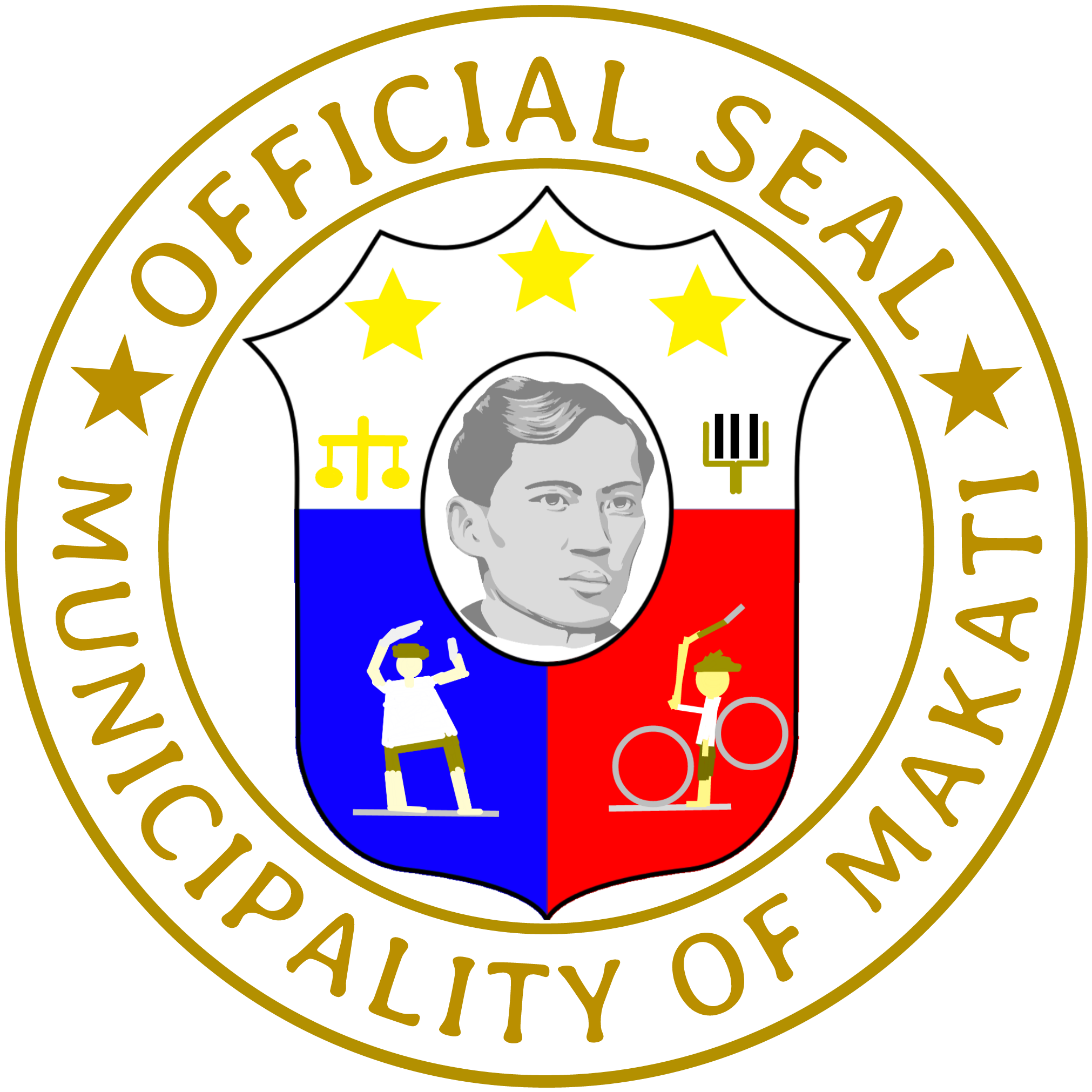
- December 14, 1937
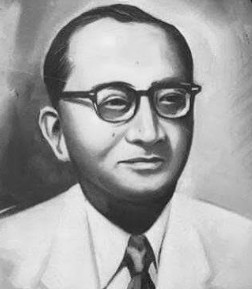

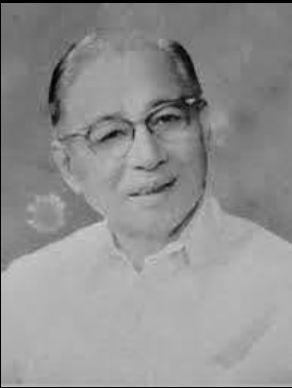
Nominee	Jose D. Villena	Nicanor F. Garcia
Party	Partido Nacionalista Consolidado	Partido Democrata Nacional
Running mate	Deogracias Luciano	Pablo C. Cortes
Popular vote	2,864	2,185
Mayor before election
Jose D. Villena
Nacionalista
Elected mayor
Jose D. Villena
Nacionalista
- Vice mayoral election
Candidate	Deogracias Luciano	Pablo C. Cortes	Irineo Avinado
Party	Partido Nacionalista Consolidado	Partido Democrata Nacional	Independiente
Popular vote	2,017	1,773	662
Candidate	Sabino Gutierrez
Party	Independiente
Popular vote	610
Vice Mayor before election
Deogracias Luciano
Nacionalista
Elected Vice Mayor
Deogracias Luciano
Nacionalista
- Municipal Council election

8 seats in the Makati Municipal Council 5 seats needed for a majority
	First party	Second party
Party	Partido Nacionalista Consolidado	Partido Democrata Nacional
Last election	5 seats	3 seats
Seats won	5	3
Seat change	Same position	Same position

Local elections was held in the Municipality of Makati on December 14, 1937, within the 1937 Philippine local elections, during the administration of President Manuel Quezon. The voters elected for the elective local posts in the town: the mayor, vice mayor, and the eight-member local municipal council. The municipality of Makati was then under the jurisdiction of the 1st congressional district of the Province of Rizal. The elections for the district representatives were held in 1935. This was the first local elections in Makati after the ratification of the new 1935 Philippine Constitution on May 14, 1935.

== Background ==
Incumbent Makati mayor Jose D. Villena is running for his second term, having been elected as municipal mayor in 1934. He selected incumbent vice mayor Deogracias Luciano as his running mate. Both are stalwarts of the ruling Partido Nacionalista Consolidado.

His challenger for mayor was former mayor Nicanor C. Garcia, candidate of the rival Partido Democrata Nacional. He was Makati mayor from 1922 to 1934. His vice-mayoral running mate was former vice mayor Pablo C. Cortes.

At the time, Philippine politics was dominated by the Nacionalistas, who were opposed by several parties, among them the Partido Democrata Nacional, Partido Reformista, and the Young Philippines Party.

== Candidates ==
=== Partido Nacionalista Consolidado ===
Name	Party
For Mayor
Jose Daniel S. Villena Sr.	Nacionalista
For Vice Mayor
Deogracias Luciano	Nacionalista
For Councilor
Dionisio Afable	Nacionalista
Luis Anastacio	Nacionalista
Diego Benito	Nacionalista
Felix Blanco	Nacionalista
Amado E. Diaz	Nacionalista
Fidel Dionisio	Nacionalista
Tomas B. Estacio	Nacionalista
Eliseo D. Viray	Nacionalista

=== Partido Democrata Nacional ===
Name	Party
For Mayor
Nicanor C. Garcia	Democrata
For Vice Mayor
Pablo C. Cortes	Democrata
For Councilor
Maximo Arcangel	Democrata
Ventura Canilao	Democrata
Marcos Concepcion	Democrata
Jose Cunanan	Democrata
Tomas Gonzalez	Democrata
Monico Policarpio	Democrata
Pedro Santiago	Democrata
Martin Santos	Democrata

=== Independent ===
For Vice Mayor
Irineo Avinado	Independent
Sabino Gutierrez	Independent

== Results ==
=== Mayor ===
Incumbent mayor Jose D. Villena defeated former mayor Nicanor Garcia.

1937 Makati mayoral election
Candidate	Party	Votes	%
Jose Daniel S. Villena Sr.	Partido Nacionalista Consolidado	2,864	56.72
Nicanor C. Garcia	Partido Democrata Nacional	2,185	43.28
Total		5,049	100.00
Nacionalista hold			
Source: Philippine Commission on Elections

=== Vice Mayor ===
Incumbent vice mayor Deogracias Luciano won against former vice mayor Pablo Cortes. Cortes filed an election protest which was later denied by the Supreme Court.

1937 Makati vice mayoral election
Candidate	Party	Votes	%
Deogracias Luciano	Partido Nacionalista Consolidado	2,017	39.85
Pablo C. Cortes	Partido Democrata Nacional	1,773	35.03
Irineo Avinado	Independiente	662	13.08
Sabino Gutierrez	Independiente	610	12.05
Total		5,062	100.00
Nacionalista hold			
Source: Philippine Commission on Elections

=== 1935 elections for Rizal 1st District Representative ===
Pedro Magsalin won re-election as 1st congressional district representative against four other contenders. The election for this position was held on September 16, 1935. This district holds jurisdiction over the Municipality of Makati. The winner held term from 1935 to 1938.

1935 Rizal's 1st congressional district representative election
Candidate	Party	Votes	%
Pedro Magsalin	Partido Nacionalista Consolidado	12,847	45.96
Andres Pascual	Partido Nacionalista Coalicionista	7,936	28.39
Miguel Cornejo	Partido Reformista	4,183	14.96
Genaro T. Torres	Independiente	1,726	6.17
Maximo M. Madrinal	Independiente	1,263	4.52
Total		27,955	100.00
Partido Nacionalista Consolidado hold			
Source: Philippine Commission on Elections

=== Municipal Council ===
Five of the eight winning candidates came from the Partido Nacionalista Consolidado, while the remaining three were from the Partido Democrata Nacional.

Municipal Council election at Makati's lone district
Party	Candidate	Votes	%
Nacionalista	Felix Blanco	1,781	
Nacionalista	Diego Benito	1,681	
Nacionalista	Amado E. Diaz	1,628	
Democrata	Martin Santos	1,478	
Democrata	Pedro Santiago	1,369	
Nacionalista	Luis Anastacio	1,365	
Nacionalista	Eliseo D. Viray	1,164	
Democrata	Marcos Concepcion	1,009	
Democrata	Tomas Gonzalez	1,008	
Democrata	Jose Cunanan	1,005	
Nacionalista	Dionisio Afable	996	
Nacionalista	Fidel Dionisio	965	
Democrata	Ventura Canilao	900	
Nacionalista	Tomas B. Estacio	845	
Democrata	Monico Policarpio	796	
Democrata	Maximo Arcangel	750	

=== Aftermath ===
Mayor Villena will be re-elected three more times: in 1940, 1947 and 1951. He will be opposed for the mayorship by Cortes in 1940 and 1947, which Villena both won.
