= 1947 Makati local elections =

Local elections in the Philippines

1947 Makati mayoral election
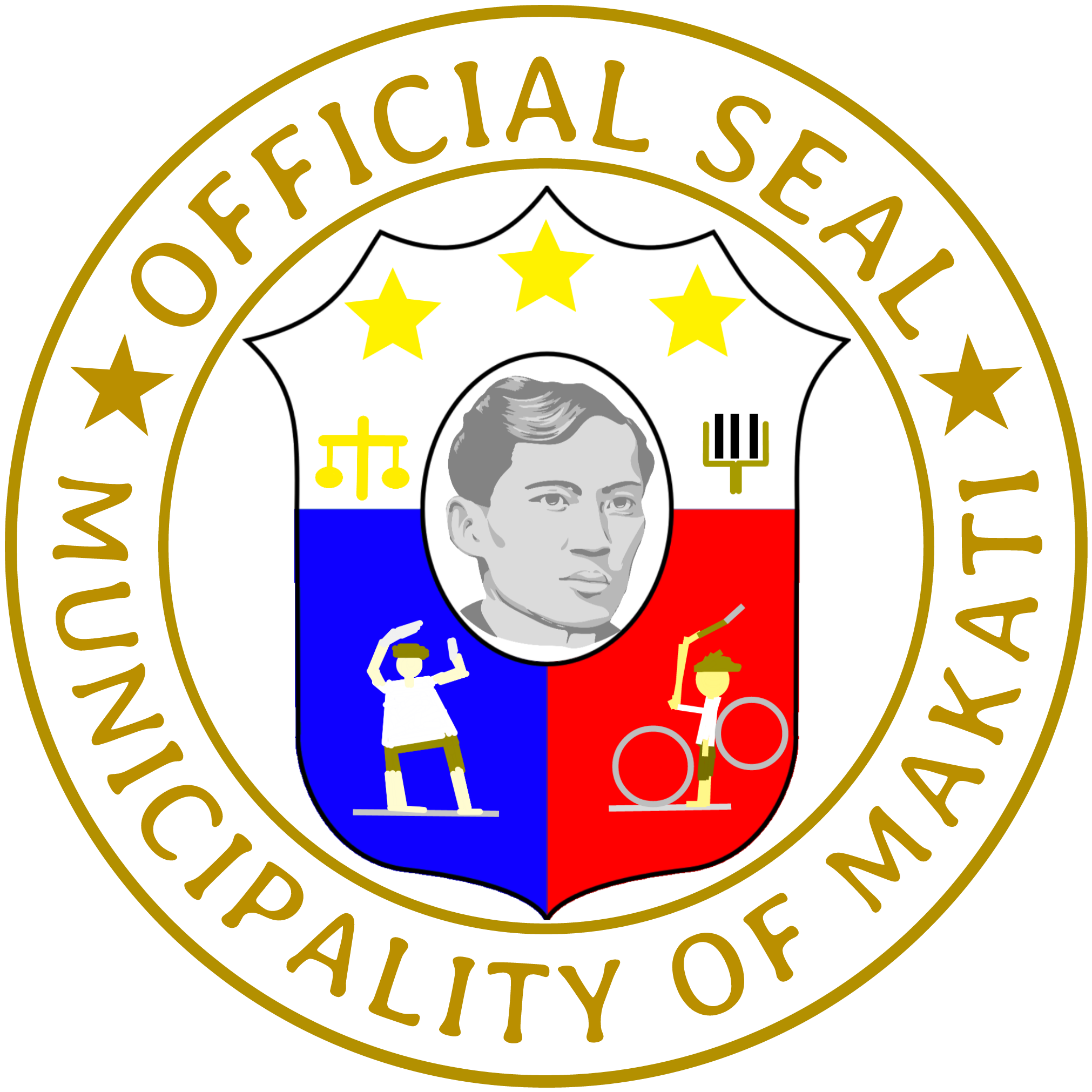
- November 11, 1947
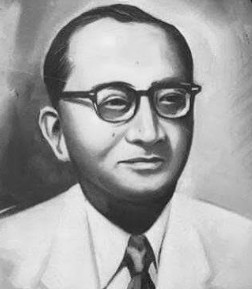

Nominee	Jose D. Villena	Pablo C. Cortes
Party	Nacionalista	Liberal
Running mate	Tomas A. Baluyut	Deogracias Luciano
Popular vote	6,284	4,065
Mayor before election
Pablo Cortes
Nacionalista
Elected mayor
Jose D. Villena
Nacionalista
- Vice mayoral election
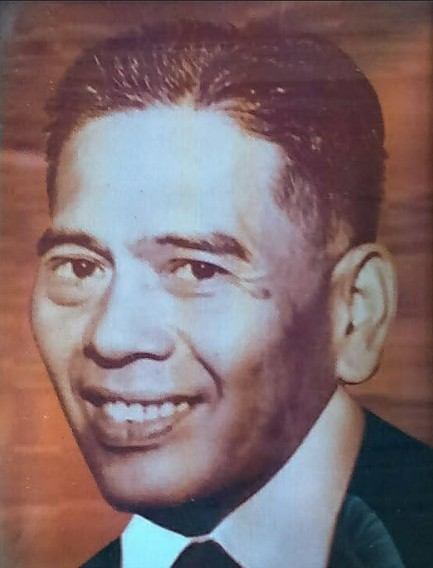
Candidate	Tomas A. Baluyut	Deogracias Luciano
Party	Nacionalista	Liberal
Popular vote	5,873	4,723
Vice Mayor before election
Deogracias Luciano
Nacionalista
Elected Vice Mayor
Tomas A. Baluyut
Nacionalista
- Municipal Council election

8 seats in the Makati Municipal Council 5 seats needed for a majority
	First party	Second party
Party	Nacionalista	Liberal
Seats won	8	0
Popular vote	54,305	30,235

Local elections was held in the Municipality of Makati on November 11, 1947, within the 1947 Philippine local elections, during the administration of President Manuel Roxas. The voters elected for the elective local posts in the town: the mayor, vice mayor, and the eight-member local municipal council. The municipality of Makati was then under the jurisdiction of the 1st congressional district of the Province of Rizal. The elections for the district representatives were held in 1946. This was the first post-war local elections in Makati since 1940.

== Background ==
Incumbent Makati mayor Pablo Cortes is running for his second (first elected) term, having been appointed as municipal mayor in 1944, before the end of the Japanese occupation of the Philippines. He selected incumbent vice mayor Deogracias Luciano as his running mate. Both defected to the newly-formed Liberal Party.

His challenger for mayor was former mayor Jose D. Villena, the Nacionalista Party candidate. He was Makati mayor from 1934 to 1944. His vice-mayoral running mate was incumbent councilor Tomas A. Baluyut. This was the second time that Villena and Cortes have competed for the mayoral post, having met in 1940, which Villena won.

At the time, Philippine politics was under the Two-party system, dominated by the Liberals and Nacionalistas.

== Candidates ==
=== Liberal Party ===
Name	Party
For Mayor
Pablo C. Cortes	Liberal
For Vice Mayor
Deogracias Luciano	Liberal
For Councilor
Jose Alarilla	Liberal
Benjamin Bautista	Liberal
Isidro de Leon	Liberal
Florentino Dimaguila	Liberal
Jose Mayor	Liberal
Juan Patag	Liberal
Abundio G. Suck	Liberal
Justino Ventura	Liberal

=== Nacionalista Party ===
Name	Party
For Mayor
Jose Daniel S. Villena Sr.	Nacionalista
For Vice Mayor
Tomas A. Baluyut	Nacionalista
For Councilor
Ignacio C. Babasa	Nacionalista
Manuel Blas	Nacionalista
Amado E. Diaz	Nacionalista
Tomas B. Estacio	Nacionalista
Dionisio S. Flores	Nacionalista
Jose Gavia	Nacionalista
Fortunato M. Gutierrez	Nacionalista
Eliseo D. Viray	Nacionalista

== Results ==
=== Mayor ===
Former mayor Jose D. Villena defeated incumbent mayor Pablo Cortes once again.

1947 Makati mayoral election
Candidate	Party	Votes	%
Jose Daniel S. Villena Sr.	Nacionalista	6,284	60.72
Pablo C. Cortes	Liberal	4,065	39.28
Total		10,349	100.00
Nacionalista hold			
Source: Philippine Commission on Elections

=== Vice Mayor ===
Former councilor Tomas Baluyut won against incumbent vice mayor Deogracias Luciano.

1947 Makati vice mayoral election
Candidate	Party	Votes	%
Tomas A. Baluyut	Nacionalista	5,873	56.75
Deogracias Luciano	Liberal Party	4,476	43.25
Total		10,349	100.00
Nacionalista hold			
Source: Philippine Commission on Elections

=== Rizal 1st District Representative ===
Ignacio Santos-Diaz won as 1st congressional district representative against three other contenders, among them incumbent congressman Francisco Sevilla. The election for this position was held on April 23, 1946. This district holds jurisdiction over the Municipality of Makati.

1946 Rizal's 1st congressional district representative election
Candidate	Party	Votes	%
Ignacio Santos-Diaz	Liberal	48,763	56.16
Francisco Sevilla	Nacionalista	23,491	27.05
Miguel Cornejo	Popular Front	9,184	10.58
Cirilo Bogno	Laborite Party	5,391	6.21
Total		86,829	100.00
Liberal gain on Nacionalista			
Source: Philippine Commission on Elections

=== Municipal Council ===
All eight winning candidates came from the Nacionalista Party.

Municipal Council election at Makati's lone district
Party	Candidate	Votes	%
Nacionalista	Amado E. Diaz	7,863	
Nacionalista	Eliseo D. Viray	7,421	
Nacionalista	Tomas B. Estacio	7,188	
Nacionalista	Dionisio S. Flores	6,947	
Nacionalista	Jose Gavia	6,714	
Nacionalista	Ignacio C. Babasa	6,382	
Nacionalista	Fortunato M. Gutierrez	6,059	
Nacionalista	Manuel Blas	5,731	
Liberal	Abundio G. Suck	4,986	
Liberal	Justino Ventura	4,617	
Liberal	Florentino Dimaguila	4,283	
Liberal	Juan Patag	3,951	
Liberal	Benjamin Bautista	3,624	
Liberal	Jose Alarilla	3,287	
Liberal	Isidro de Leon	2,914	
Liberal	Jose Mayor	2,573	

=== Aftermath ===
Villena will be re-elected for the last time in 1951. In 1954, he was suspended by President Elpidio Quirino on June 19, 1953, due to alleged misconduct. He would run four more times: in 1955, 1959, 1963, and 1967, in which he lost all instances.
