= 1934 Makati local elections =

Local elections in the Philippines

1934 Makati mayoral election
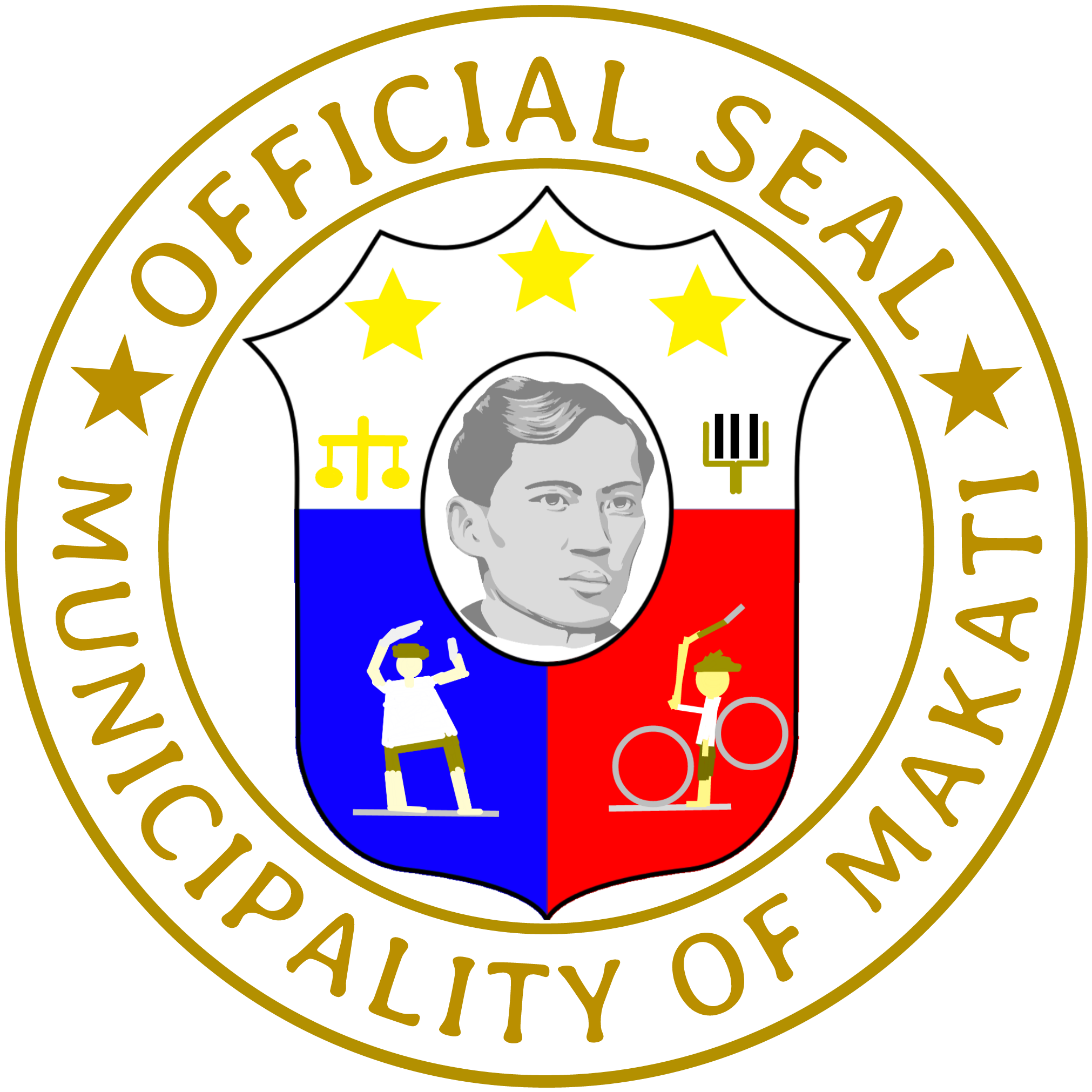
- June 5, 1934
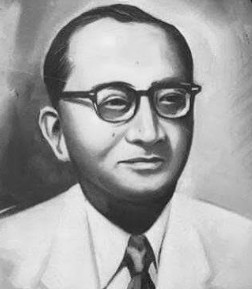

Nominee	Jose D. Villena	Pablo C. Cortes
Party	Partido Nacionalista Consolidado	Partido Democrata Nacional
Running mate	Deogracias Luciano	Sabino Gutierrez
Popular vote	2,387	1,642
Mayor before election
Nicanor C. Garcia
Democrata
Elected mayor
Jose D. Villena
Nacionalista
- Vice mayoral election
Candidate	Deogracias Luciano	Sabino Gutierrez
Party	Partido Nacionalista Consolidado	Partido Democrata Nacional
Popular vote	2,347	1,682
Vice Mayor before election
Pablo Cortes
Democrata
Elected Vice Mayor
Deogracias Luciano
Nacionalista
- Municipal Council election

8 seats in the Makati Municipal Council 5 seats needed for a majority
	First party	Second party
Party	Partido Nacionalista Consolidado	Partido Democrata Nacional
Last election	2 seats	4 seats
Seats won	5	3
Seat change	▲3	▼1

Local elections was held in the Municipality of Makati on June 5, 1934, within the 1934 Philippine local elections, under the auspices of the American Civil Government in the Philippines. The voters elected for the elective local posts in the town: the mayor, vice mayor, and the eight-member local municipal council. The municipality of Makati was then under the jurisdiction of the 1st congressional district of the Province of Rizal. The elections for the district representatives were held in 1934. This was the last local elections in Makati before the creation and later, ratification of the new 1935 Philippine Constitution on May 14, 1935. This was also the last Philippine local elections held in the month of June.

== Background ==
Incumbent Makati mayor Nicanor C. Garcia is not seeking another term and instead ran as Rizal Provincial Board member. His Partido Democrata Nacional selected incumbent vice mayor Pablo Cortes as their candidate for mayor. Cortes selected Sabino Gutierrez as his running mate.

Cortes' challenger for mayor was Jose D. Villena, candidate of the rival Partido Nacionalista Consolidado. He ran as mayor in 1931 against Mayor Garcia but lost. He also ran unsuccessful bids for vice mayor in 1925 and 1928. His vice-mayoral running mate was Deogracias Luciano.

At the time, Philippine politics was dominated by the Nacionalistas, who were opposed by several parties, among them the Partido Democrata Nacional, Partido Reformista, and others. The Nacionalistas and Democratas at the time were divided between the Pros (In favor of accepting the Hare-Hawes-Cutting Act) and Antis (Against accepting the Hare-Hawes-Cutting Act). In the Makati local political scene, the Democratas have dominated every election since 1922.

== Candidates ==
=== Partido Democrata Nacional ===
Name	Party
For Mayor
Pablo C. Cortes	Democrata
For Vice Mayor
Sabino Gutierrez	Democrata
For Councilor
Marcos Concepcion	Democrata
Jose Cunanan	Democrata
Tomas Gonzalez	Democrata
Felipe Juan	Democrata
Pedro Santiago	Democrata
Gregorio Santos	Democrata
Martin Santos	Democrata
Abundio G. Suck	Democrata

=== Partido Nacionalista Consolidado ===
Name	Party
For Mayor
Jose Daniel S. Villena Sr.	Nacionalista
For Vice Mayor
Deogracias Luciano	Nacionalista
For Councilor
Dionisio Afable	Nacionalista
Luis Anastacio	Nacionalista
Diego Benito	Nacionalista
Felix Blanco	Nacionalista
Amado E. Diaz	Nacionalista
Fidel Dionisio	Nacionalista
Tomas B. Estacio	Nacionalista
Eliseo D. Viray	Nacionalista

== Results ==
=== Mayor ===
Jose D. Villena defeated incumbent vice mayor Pablo Cortes.

1934 Makati mayoral election
Candidate	Party	Votes	%
Jose Daniel S. Villena Sr.	Partido Nacionalista Consolidado	2,387	59.25
Pablo C. Cortes	Partido Democrata Nacional	1,642	40.75
Total		4,029	100.00
Nacionalista gain on Democrata			
Source: Philippine Commission on Elections

=== Vice Mayor ===
Deogracias Luciano won against Sabino Gutierrez.

1934 Makati vice mayoral election
Candidate	Party	Votes	%
Deogracias Luciano	Partido Nacionalista Consolidado	2,347	58.25
Sabino Gutierrez	Partido Democrata Nacional	1,682	41.75
Total		4,029	100.00
Nacionalista gain on Democrata			
Source: Philippine Commission on Elections

=== 1934 elections for Rizal 1st District Representative ===
Pedro Magsalin won re-election as 1st congressional district representative against Genaro Torres. The election for this position was held on June 5, 1934. This district holds jurisdiction over the Municipality of Makati. The winner held term only for one (1) year, from 1934 to 1935, due to the upcoming 1934 Philippine Constitutional Convention election.

1934 Rizal's 1st congressional district representative election
Candidate	Party	Votes	%
Pedro Magsalin	Partido Nacionalista Consolidado	15,183	64.66
Genaro T. Torres	Coalicion Democrata-Nacionalista	8,298	35.34
Total		23,481	100.00
Partido Nacionalista Consolidado hold			
Source: Philippine Commission on Elections

=== Municipal Council ===
Five of the eight winning candidates came from the Partido Nacionalista Consolidado, while the remaining three were from the Partido Democrata Nacional. This was the first local election in Makati in which the number of members of the Municipal Board was increased from six to eight.

Municipal Council election at Makati's lone district
Party	Candidate	Votes	%
Nacionalista	Amado E. Diaz	3,187	
Democrata	Abundio G. Suck	2,914	
Nacionalista	Tomas B. Estacio	2,763	
Democrata	Gregorio Santos	2,541	
Nacionalista	Eliseo D. Viray	2,384	
Democrata	Felipe Juan	2,217	
Nacionalista	Dionisio Afable	2,086	
Nacionalista	Luis Anastacio	1,973	
Democrata	Martin Santos	1,846	
Nacionalista	Felix Blanco	1,721	
Democrata	Pedro Santiago	1,593	
Nacionalista	Diego Benito	1,467	
Democrata	Marcos Concepcion	1,318	
Nacionalista	Fidel Dionisio	1,176	
Democrata	Tomas Gonzalez	1,029	
Democrata	Jose Cunanan	873	

=== Aftermath ===
Mayor Villena will be re-elected four more times: in 1937, 1940, 1947 and 1951. He will be opposed for the mayorship by Cortes in 1937, 1940 and 1947, which Villena all won.
