= Jose Feria =

Filipino lawyer and jurist (1917–2008)

The Honorable Jose Y. Feria

109th Associate Justice of the Supreme Court of the Philippines
- In office April 7, 1986 – January 10, 1987
- Appointed by: Corazon Aquino
- Preceded by: Felix Makasiar
- Succeeded by: Irene Cortes

Member of the Makati Municipal Council
- In office December 30, 1959 – December 30, 1967

Personal details
- Born: January 11, 1917 Pasay, Rizal, Philippine Islands
- Died: May 8, 2008 (aged 91) Makati, Philippines
- Party: Democratic (until 1957); MCLGG (1957–1965); Progressive (1965)

Jose Yusay Feria (January 11, 1917 – May 8, 2008) was a Filipino lawyer and jurist who served as an Associate Justice of the Supreme Court of the Philippines from 1986 to 1987. He was among the first appointees to the Supreme Court of President Corazon Aquino.

== Biography ==
Jose Y. Feria was born in Pasay. His father, Felicisimo Feria, served as a Justice of the Supreme Court during the 1940s and 1950s.

Feria earned his undergraduate degree in Commerce from the De La Salle College in 1936, and his Bachelor of Laws degree from the University of Santo Tomas in 1940. He taught law at the Lilian College of Law (1936–1940). He then joined the faculty of the University of Santo Tomas College of Law (1940–1984). He became known for several textbooks he authored on procedural law. He would also lecture at the Instituto de Derecho Processal, Colegio de Abogados in Madrid, Spain. He ran for a seat in the municipal council of Makati in 1955, but lost the elections. Feria would won a seat in 1959 and 1963. Feria ran for senator in 1965 but lost.

He was also a lecturer at the University of the Philippines Law Center.

In 1971, Feria was elected as a delegate to the Constitutional Convention, representing the First District of Rizal. From 1978 to 1980, he was elected as President of the Philippine Bar Association. In 1979, he was appointed Dean of the University of Santo Tomas Faculty of Law, and he served in that capacity until 1985.

Feria was appointed to the Supreme Court by President Aquino in April 1986. He served as an associate justice of the Court until he reached the mandatory retirement age of 70 on January 11, 1987. Upon his retirement, he rejoined private practice.

He authored books on Civil Procedure, Provisional Remedies & Special Civil Action and several articles on Constitutional Law, an Annotation on the Judiciary Reorganization Act, Interim Rules of Court, and the 1985 Rules on Criminal Procedure.

Feria died in Makati on May 8, 2008. He left behind his wife Concepcion and his four children, along with 18 grandchildren and 20 great-grandchildren.

Preceded by Felix Makasiar	Associate Justice of the Supreme Court of the Philippines; 1986–1987	Succeeded by Irene Cortes
