= 1940 Makati local elections =

Local election in the Philippines

1940 Makati mayoral election
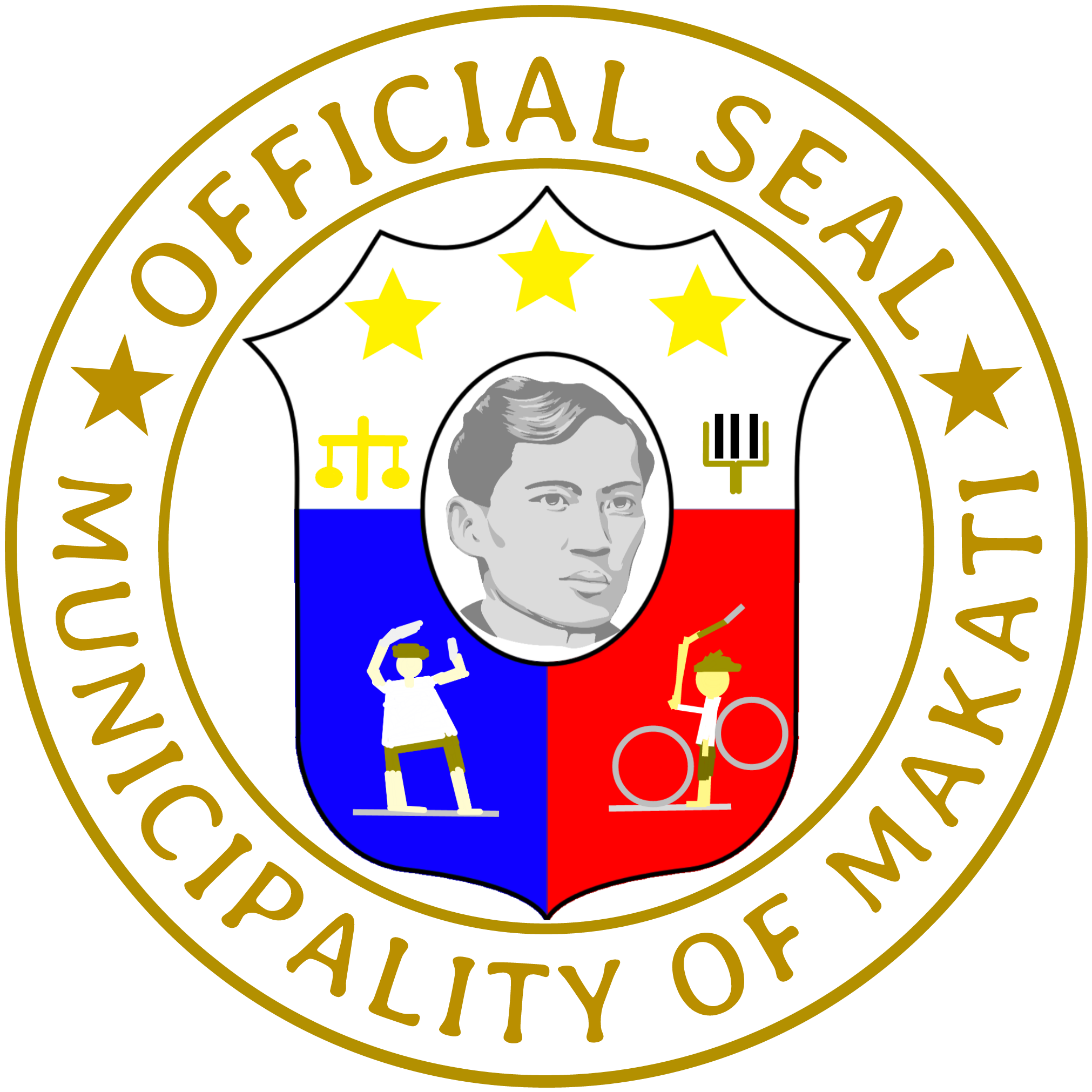
- December 10, 1940
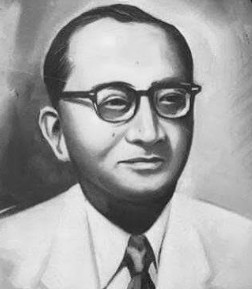

Nominee	Jose D. Villena	Pablo C. Cortes
Party	Coalicion Nacionalista	Popular Front
Running mate	Deogracias Luciano	Martin Santos
Popular vote	3,487	2,875
Mayor before election
Jose D. Villena
Nacionalista
Elected mayor
Jose D. Villena
Nacionalista
- Vice mayoral election
Candidate	Deogracias Luciano	Martin Santos
Party	Coalicion Nacionalista	Popular Front
Popular vote	3,214	3,148
Vice Mayor before election
Deogracias Luciano
Nacionalista
Elected Vice Mayor
Deogracias Luciano
Nacionalista

Local elections was held in the Municipality of Makati on December 10, 1940, within the 1940 Philippine local elections, during the administration of President Manuel Quezon. The voters elected for the elective local posts in the town: the mayor, vice mayor, and the eight-member local municipal council. The municipality of Makati was then under the jurisdiction of the 1st congressional district of the Province of Rizal. The elections for the district representatives were held in 1938 and in 1941. This was the last local elections in Makati before the Japanese occupation of the Philippines in January 1942.

== Background ==
Incumbent Makati mayor Jose D. Villena is running for his third term, having been elected as municipal mayor in 1934 and 1937. He selected incumbent vice mayor Deogracias Luciano as his running mate. Both are stalwarts of the ruling Partido Nacionalista Consolidado.

His challenger for mayor was former vice mayor Pablo Cortes, candidate of the newly-formed Popular Front. He was Makati vice mayor from 1922 to 1934, during the administration of then-mayor Nicanor F. Garcia. His vice-mayoral running mate was incumbent councilor Martin Santos.

At the time, Philippine politics was dominated by the Nacionalistas, who were opposed by several parties, among them the Popular Front, Partido Democrata Nacional, and the Young Philippines Party.

== Candidates ==
=== Coalicion Nacionalista ===
Name	Party
For Mayor
Jose Daniel S. Villena Sr.	Nacionalista
For Vice Mayor
Deogracias Luciano	Nacionalista

=== Popular Front ===
Name	Party
For Mayor
Pablo C. Cortes	Popular Front
For Vice Mayor
Martin Santos	Popular Front

== Results ==
=== Mayor ===
Incumbent mayor Jose D. Villena defeated former vice mayor Pablo Cortes.

1940 Makati mayoral election
Candidate	Party	Votes	%
Jose Daniel S. Villena Sr.	Coalicion Nacionalista	3,487	54.81
Pablo C. Cortes	Popular Front	2,875	45.19
Total		6,362	100.00
Nacionalista hold			
Source: Philippine Commission on Elections

=== Vice Mayor ===
Incumbent vice mayor Deogracias Luciano won against incumbent councilor Martin Santos.

1940 Makati vice mayoral election
Candidate	Party	Votes	%
Deogracias Luciano	Coalicion Nacionalista	3,214	50.52
Martin Santos	Popular Front	3,148	49.48
Total		6,362	100.00
Nacionalista hold			
Source: Philippine Commission on Elections

=== 1938 elections for Rizal 1st District Representative ===
Francisco Sevilla won as 1st congressional district representative against eight other contenders, among them incumbent Makati mayor Jose D. Villena. The election for this position was held on November 8 ,1938. This district holds jurisdiction over the Municipality of Makati. The winner held term from 1938 to 1941.

1938 Rizal's 1st congressional district representative election
Candidate	Party	Votes	%
Francisco Sevilla	Partido Nacionalista Consolidado	19,616	56.00
Anatolia Reyes	Partido Nacionalista Consolidado	6,793	19.39
Elpidio Santos	Partido Ganap de Filipinas	3,438	9.81
Wenceslao Virata	Partido Ganap de Filipinas	2,415	6.89
Jose Daniel S. Villena Sr.	Partido Nacionalista Consolidado	1,823	5.20
Maximino M. Magtoto	Frente Popular	761	2.17
Gualberto Cruz	Partido Liberal	173	0.49
Ramon Comagon	Frente Popular	6	0.02
Alejandro San Miguel	Frente Popular	5	0.01
Total		35,030	100.00
Partido Nacionalista Consolidado hold			
Source: Philippine Commission on Elections

=== 1941 elections for Rizal 1st District Representative ===
Francisco Sevilla won re-election as 1st congressional district representative against former representative Miguel Cornejo. The election for this position was held on November 11 ,1941. This district holds jurisdiction over the Municipality of Makati. The winner held term from 1941 to 1944, though it was interrupted by World War II and the subsequent Japanese occupation of the Philippines.

1941 Rizal's 1st congressional district representative election
Candidate	Party	Votes	%
Francisco Sevilla	Coalicion Nacionalista	18,506	74.83
Miguel Cornejo	Popular Front	6,226	25.17
Total		24,732	100.00
Coalicion Nacionalista hold			
Source: Philippine Commission on Elections

=== Municipal Council ===
There were no surviving records regarding the results for the members of the Makati Municipal Board, as most election files were destroyed during World War II. There were some records, however that one of the elected councilors was Atty. Tomas Baluyut, the future vice mayor of Makati.

=== Aftermath ===
Mayor Villena's term will be interrupted by the war. On December 24, 1941, President Manuel Quezon appointed Secretary Jorge B. Vargas as Mayor of the City of Greater Manila, whose merger included the municipality of Makati, effectively ending Villena's term as mayor. Villena will be elected for two more terms, in 1947 and 1951.
