= 1955 Makati local elections =

Local elections in the Philippines

1955 Makati mayoral election
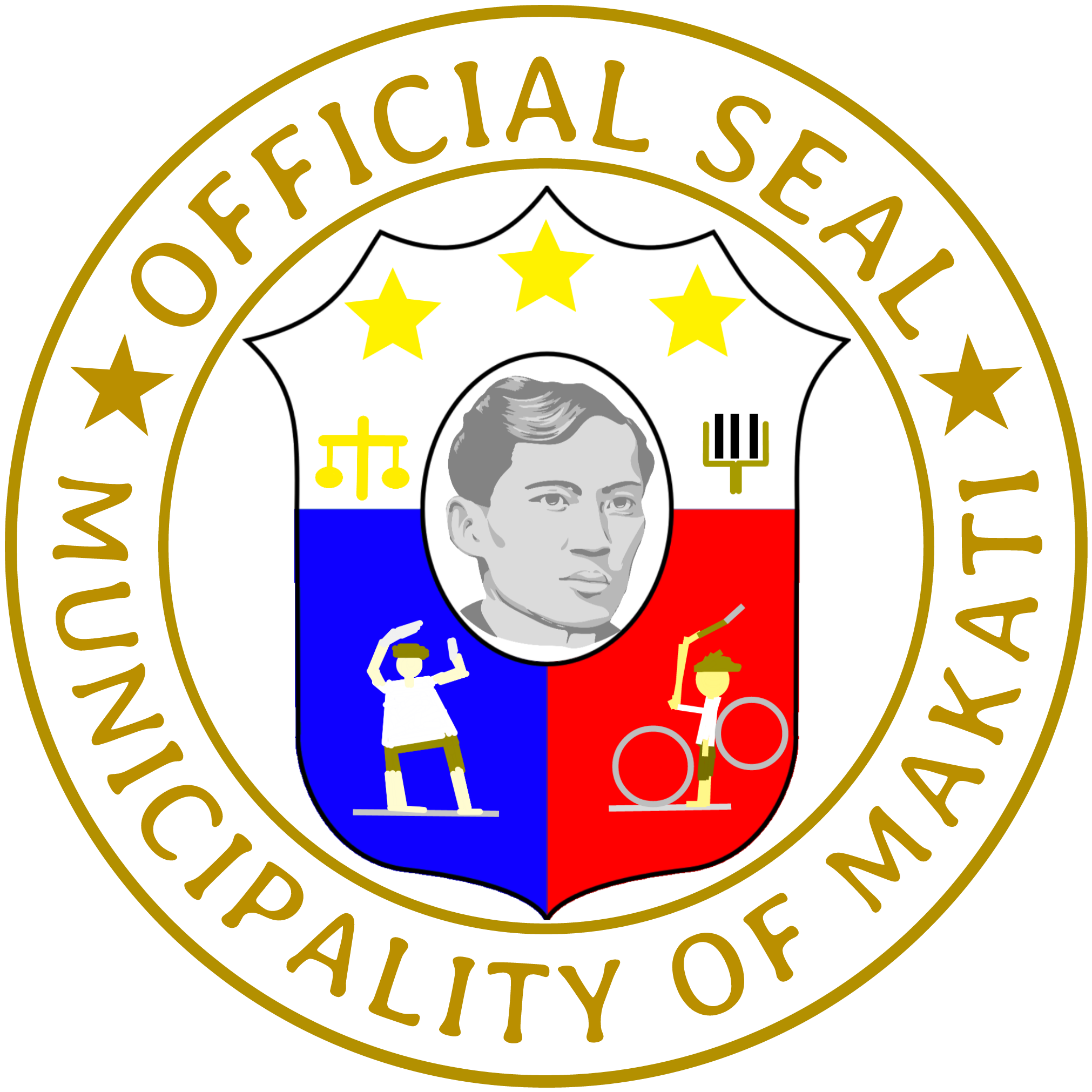
- November 8, 1955
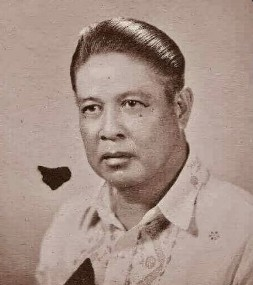

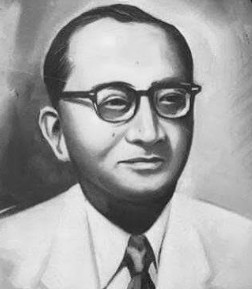

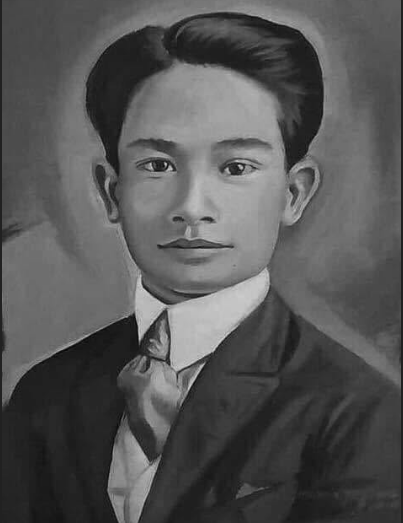
Nominee	Maximo Estrella	Jose D. Villena	Bernardo Umali
Party	Liberal	Nacionalista	Democratic
Running mate	Juan Patag	Benjamin Guerra	Ernesto Policarpio
Popular vote	7,131	6,548	2,523
Mayor before election
Bernardo Umali
Nacionalista
Elected mayor
Maximo B. Estrella
Liberal
- Vice mayoral election
Candidate	Juan Patag	Benjamin Guerra	Ernesto Policarpio
Party	Liberal	Nacionalista	Democratic
Popular vote	5,025	4,723	4,332
Candidate	Faustino Bautista
Party	Independent
Popular vote	1,851
Vice Mayor before election
Bernardo Umali
Liberal
Elected Vice Mayor
Juan Patag
Liberal
- Municipal Council election

8 seats in the Makati Municipal Council 5 seats needed for a majority
	First party	Second party
Party	Liberal	Nacionalista
Last election	3 seats	5 seats
Seats won	5	3
Seat change	▲2	▼2

Local elections was held in the Municipality of Makati on November 8, 1955, within the 1955 Philippine local elections, during the administration of President Ramon Magsaysay. The voters elected for the elective local posts in the town: the mayor, vice mayor, and the eight-member local municipal council. The municipality of Makati was then under the jurisdiction of the 1st congressional district of the Province of Rizal. The elections for the district representatives were held in 1953.

== Background ==
Incumbent Makati mayor Jose D. Villena is running for his sixth term, having been elected in every mayoral election from 1934 to 1951. Villena was suspended by President Elpidio Quirino on June 19, 1953, due to alleged misconduct. He was succeeded as mayor by Councilor Ignacio Babasa, after the incumbent vice mayor, Bernardo Umali, was also suspended by the Makati Municipal Council, as a result of a separate case filed against him and councilor Abundio Suck. Umali eventually succeeded Babasa as acting mayor in 1954.

Villena is a staunch candidate of the Nacionalista Party. He selected Benjamin Guerra as his running mate.

His challengers for mayor were:

- Businessman Maximo Estrella of the Liberal Party, with Juan Patag as his running mate.
- Acting Mayor Bernardo Umali of the Democratic Party, with Ernesto Policarpio as his vice-mayoralty candidate.

At the time, Philippine politics was under the Two-party system, dominated by the Liberals and Nacionalistas, with the Democratic Party posing as a strong third political party.

== Candidates ==
=== Nacionalista Party ===
Name	Party
For Mayor
Jose Daniel S. Villena Sr.	Nacionalista
For Vice Mayor
Benjamin Guerra	Nacionalista
For Councilor
Ignacio C. Babasa	Nacionalista
Amado E. Diaz	Nacionalista
Tomas B. Estacio	Nacionalista
Dionisio S. Flores	Nacionalista
Fortunato M. Gutierrez	Nacionalista
Pedro Reyes	Nacionalista
Juan E. Tengco	Nacionalista
Eliseo D. Viray	Nacionalista

=== Liberal Party ===
Name	Party
For Mayor
Maximo B. Estrella	Liberal
For Vice Mayor
Juan Patag	Liberal
For Councilor
Jose Alarilla	Liberal
Benjamin Bautista	Liberal
Isidro de Leon	Liberal
Florentino Dimaguila	Liberal
Teotimo Gealogo	Liberal
Jose Mayor	Liberal
Abundio G. Suck	Liberal
Justino Ventura	Liberal

=== Democratic Party ===
Name	Party
For Mayor
Bernardo Umali	Democratic
For Vice Mayor
Ernesto Policarpio	Democratic
For Councilor
Maria Lourdes Cacho-Soriano	Democratic
Oscar Calvento	Democratic
Amado C. de Vera Jr	Democratic
Jose Feria	Democratic
Rafael C. Gaite	Democratic
Jose C. Luciano	Democratic
Fernando Suva	Democratic
Filomena Villamor	Democratic

=== Independent ===
For Vice Mayor
Faustino Bautista	Independent

== Results ==
=== Mayor ===
Maximo Estrella defeated suspended mayor Jose D. Villena and acting mayor Bernardo Umali.

1955 Makati mayoral election
Candidate	Party	Votes	%
Maximo B. Estrella	Liberal	7,131	44.01
Jose Daniel S. Villena Sr.	Nacionalista	6,548	40.41
Bernardo Umali	Democratic	2,523	15.57
Total		16,202	100.00
Liberal Party gain on Nacionalista			
Source: Philippine Commission on Elections

=== Vice Mayor ===
Juan Patag won against three other candidates.

1955 Makati vice mayoral election
Candidate	Party	Votes	%
Juan Patag	Liberal Party	5,025	31.54
Benjamin Guerra	Nacionalista	4,723	29.65
Ernesto Policarpio	Democratic	4,332	27.19
Faustino Bautista	Independent	1,851	11.62
Total		15,931	100.00
Liberal Party gain on Nacionalista			
Source: Philippine Commission on Elections

=== Rizal 1st District Representative ===
Eulogio S. Rodriguez Jr. won re-election 1st congressional district representative against two other contenders. The election for this position was held on November 10, 1953. This district holds jurisdiction over the Municipality of Makati.

1953 Rizal's 1st congressional district representative election
Candidate	Party	Votes	%
Eulogio S. Rodriguez Jr.	Nacionalista	109,164	65.59
Jose P. Marcelo	Liberal	57,063	34.28
Juan V. Aldea	Independent	217	0.13
Total		166,444	100.00
Nacionalista hold			
Source: Philippine Commission on Elections

=== Municipal Council ===
Five of eight winning candidates came from the Liberal Party. Three won from the Nacionalista Party.

Municipal Council election at Makati's lone district
Party	Candidate	Votes	%
Liberal	Justino Ventura	8,437	
Liberal	Jose Mayor	8,106	
Liberal	Florentino Dimaguila	7,684	
Nacionalista	Pedro Reyes	7,392	
Nacionalista	Ignacio C. Babasa	7,115	
Liberal	Benjamin Bautista	6,843	
Nacionalista	Juan E. Tengco	6,571	
Liberal	Teotimo Gealogo	6,284	
Liberal	Abundio G. Suck	5,963	
Nacionalista	Dionisio S. Flores	5,721	
Democratic	Jose Feria	5,418	
Liberal	Isidro de Leon	5,267	
Nacionalista	Tomas B. Estacio	5,031	
Democratic	Maria Lourdes Cacho-Soriano	4,786	
Nacionalista	Eliseo D. Viray	4,619	
Liberal	Jose Alarilla	4,397	
Democratic	Jose C. Luciano	4,183	
Nacionalista	Amado E. Diaz	3,958	
Democratic	Rafael C. Gaite	3,741	
Nacionalista	Fortunato M. Gutierrez	3,526	
Democratic	Amado C. de Vera Jr	3,289	
Democratic	Fernando Suva	2,947	
Democratic	Oscar Calvento	2,613	
Democratic	Filomena Villamor	2,281	

== Aftermath ==
Estrella and Villena would battle for the mayoral post three more times: in 1959, 1963, 1967, which Estrella all won.
