= Irene Cortes =

Associate Justice of the Supreme Court of the Philippines

The Honorable Irene Cortes

120th Associate Justice of the Supreme Court of the Philippines
- In office February 1, 1987 – October 20, 1990
- Appointed by: Corazon Aquino
- Preceded by: Jose Feria
- Succeeded by: Hilario G. Davide Jr.

Personal details
- Born: October 20, 1921 Legazpi, Albay, Philippine Islands
- Died: October 28, 1996 (aged 75) Manila, Philippines

Irene Rian Cortes (October 20, 1921 – October 28, 1996) was an Associate Justice of the Supreme Court of the Philippines and a law academic. She was also the first female dean of the University of the Philippines College of Law.

Cortes was the third woman to be appointed to the Supreme Court of the Philippines after Cecilia Muñoz-Palma and Ameurfina Melencio-Herrera.

== Professor and Dean ==
Cortes was born in Legazpi City, where she completed her intermediate studies. She studied law in the University of the Philippines College of Law, where she obtained her law degree in 1948. She then pursued graduate studies in the University of Michigan, obtaining from that university her masteral and doctoral degrees in law. Upon her return to the Philippines, Cortes joined the faculty of the U.P. College of Law, with which she would be associated for the rest of her life. She established herself as an expert in administrative law, among other fields.

In 1970, following the appointment of Dean Vicente Abad Santos as Secretary of Justice, Cortes was named as Dean of the U.P. College of Law, the first woman named to that position. She would serve as Dean until 1978. During the 1970s, Cortes was also active in the Integrated Bar of the Philippines, chairing its Committee on Professional Responsibility, Discipline and Disbarment from 1977 to 1984.

== Supreme Court Justice ==
Cortes was named Associate Justice of the Supreme Court on February 1, 1987, by President Corazon Aquino. Cortes was the third woman named to the Court, following Cecilia Muñoz-Palma and Ameurfina Melencio-Herrera. She served on the Court until she retired in 1990.

Despite her relatively brief stint on the Court, Cortes made considerable contributions to jurisprudence. Her opinion for the Court in Valmonte v. Belmonte (1989) set forth the parameters for the constitutional right to information, as guaranteed under Article III, Sec. 7 of the Constitution. More controversial was her majority opinion in Marcos v. Manglapus (1989) which carried a sharply divided 8-7 Court. Reflecting views she had previously published before she was appointed to the Court, Cortes wrote that the President possessed "residual unstated powers" beyond those granted by the Constitution "to protect the general welfare"; and that the exercise of these powers justified the presidential ban against the return to the Philippines of the deposed Ferdinand Marcos. These views on "residual powers", similar to those expressed by U.S. Associate Justice Robert H. Jackson in his concurring opinion in Youngstown Sheet & Tube Co. v. Sawyer, 343 U.S. 579 (1952), remain the subject of academic debate.

== Retirement and death ==
Cortes resumed teaching at the University of the Philippines after her retirement from the Court. She was the first female Supreme Court Justice to die, on October 28, 1996.

Legal offices
Preceded by Jose Feria	Associate Justice of the Supreme Court of the Philippines; 1987–1990	Succeeded by Hilario G. Davide Jr.
Academic offices
Preceded by Vicente Abad Santos	Dean of the U.P. College of Law; 1970–1978	Succeeded by Froilan Bacungan
