= 1951 Makati local elections =

Local elections in the Philippines

1951 Makati mayoral election
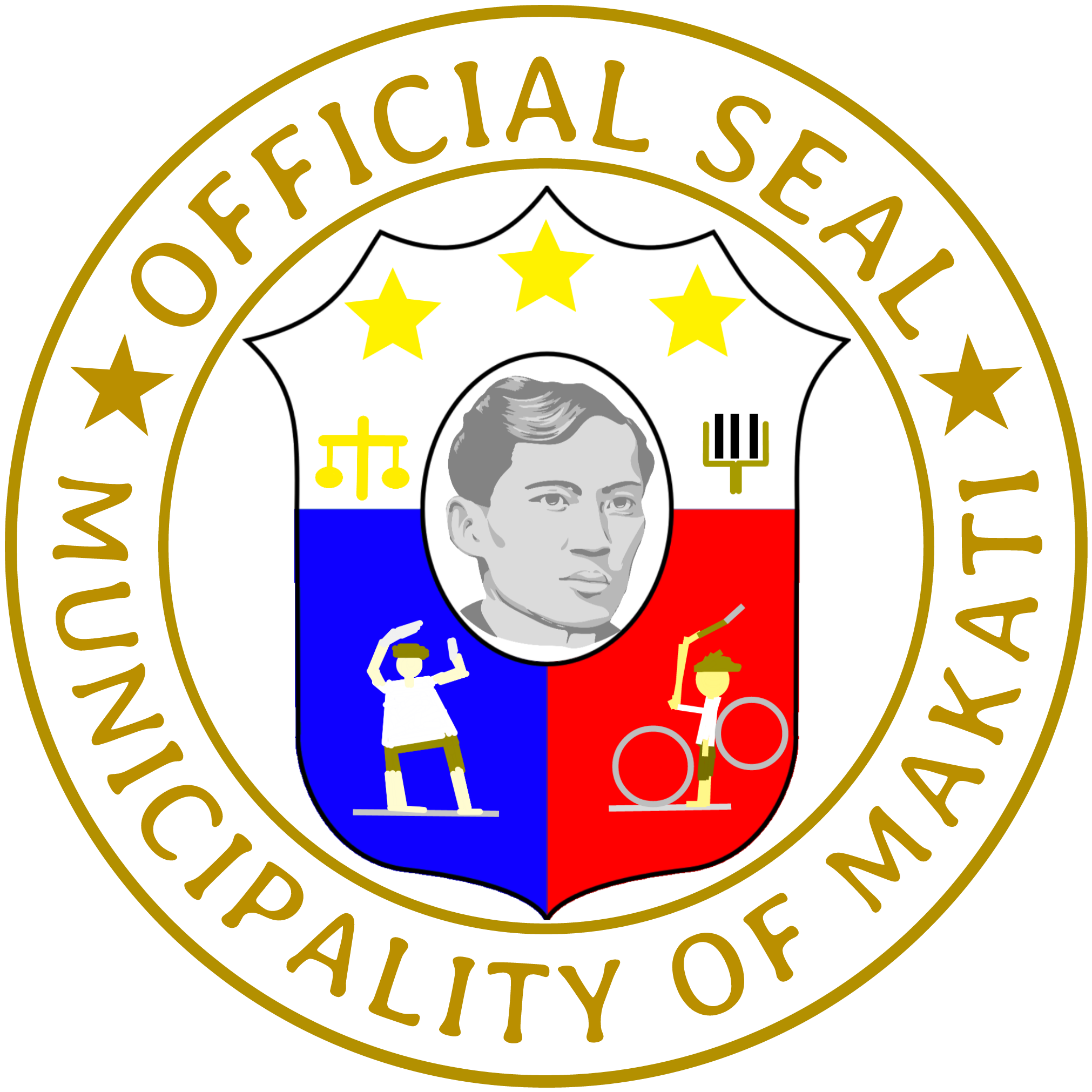
- November 13, 1951
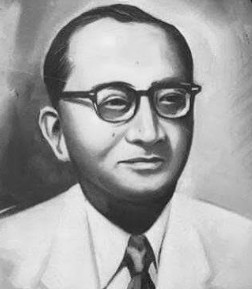

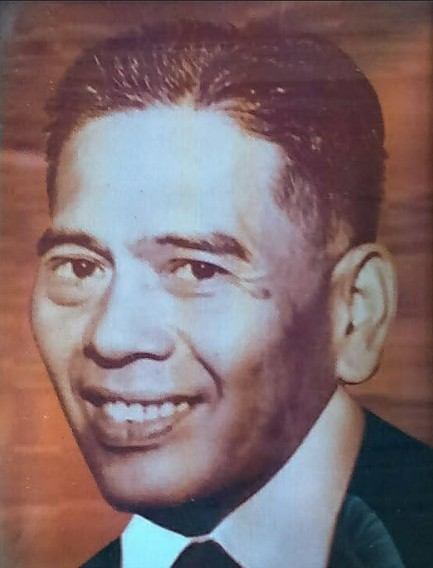
Nominee	Jose D. Villena	Tomas A. Baluyut
Party	Nacionalista	Liberal
Running mate	Pedro Reyes	Bernardo Umali
Popular vote	7,846	5,091
Mayor before election
Jose D. Villena
Nacionalista
Elected mayor
Jose D. Villena
Nacionalista
- Vice mayoral election
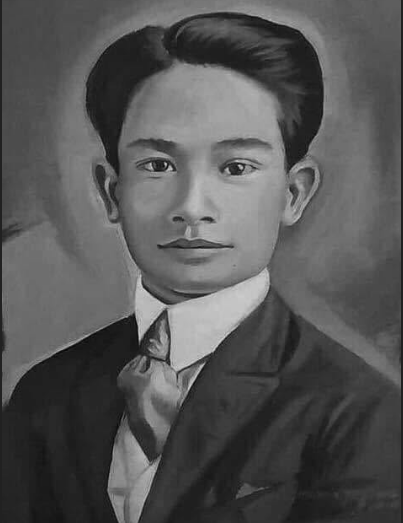
Candidate	Bernardo Umali	Pedro Reyes
Party	Liberal	Nacionalista
Popular vote	6,584	6,353
Vice Mayor before election
Tomas A. Baluyut
Nacionalista
Elected Vice Mayor
Bernardo Umali
Liberal
- Municipal Council election

8 seats in the Makati Municipal Council 5 seats needed for a majority
	First party	Second party
Party	Nacionalista	Liberal
Last election	8 seats	0 seats
Seats won	5	3
Seat change	▼3	▲3

Local elections was held in the Municipality of Makati on November 13, 1951, within the 1951 Philippine local elections, during the administration of President Elpidio Quirino. The voters elected for the elective local posts in the town: the mayor, vice mayor, and the eight-member local municipal council. The municipality of Makati was then under the jurisdiction of the 1st congressional district of the Province of Rizal. The elections for the district representatives were held in 1949.

== Background ==
Incumbent Makati mayor Jose D. Villena is running for his fifth term, having been elected in every mayoral election from 1934 to 1947. Villena is a staunch candidate of the Nacionalista Party. He selected former councilor Pedro Reyes as his running mate. His challenger for mayor was incumbent vice mayor and erstwhile ally Atty. Tomas Baluyut, who had defected to the Liberal Party, with Bernardo Umali as his running mate.

At the time, Philippine politics was under the Two-party system, dominated by the Liberals and Nacionalistas.

== Candidates ==
=== Nacionalista Party ===
Name	Party
For Mayor
Jose Daniel S. Villena Sr.	Nacionalista
For Vice Mayor
Pedro Reyes	Nacionalista
For Councilor
Ignacio C. Babasa	Nacionalista
Amado C. de Vera Jr	Nacionalista
Amado E. Diaz	Nacionalista
Tomas B. Estacio	Nacionalista
Dionisio S. Flores	Nacionalista
Jose Gavia	Nacionalista
Fortunato M. Gutierrez	Nacionalista
Eliseo D. Viray	Nacionalista

=== Liberal Party ===
Name	Party
For Mayor
Tomas A. Baluyut	Liberal
For Vice Mayor
Bernardo Umali	Liberal
For Councilor
Jose Alarilla	Liberal
Benjamin Bautista	Liberal
Isidro de Leon	Liberal
Florentino Dimaguila	Liberal
Juan Patag	Liberal
Jose Mayor	Liberal
Abundio G. Suck	Liberal
Justino Ventura	Liberal

== Results ==
=== Mayor ===
Mayor Villena defeated incumbent vice mayor Tomas Baluyut.

1951 Makati mayoral election
Candidate	Party	Votes	%
Jose Daniel S. Villena	Nacionalista	7,846	60.65
Tomas A. Baluyut	Liberal	5,091	39.35
Total		12,937	100.00
Nacionalista hold			
Source: Philippine Commission on Elections

=== Vice Mayor ===
Bernardo Umali won against Pedro Reyes.

1951 Makati vice mayoral election
Candidate	Party	Votes	%
Bernardo Umali	Liberal	6,584	50.89
Pedro Reyes	Nacionalista	6,353	49.11
Total		12,937	100.00
Liberal Party gain on Nacionalista			
Source: Philippine Commission on Elections

=== Rizal 1st District Representative ===
Eulogio S. Rodriguez Jr. won as 1st congressional district representative against three other contenders, among them incumbent congressman Ignacio Santos-Diaz. The election for this position was held on November 8, 1949. This district holds jurisdiction over the Municipality of Makati.

1949 Rizal's 1st congressional district representative election
Candidate	Party	Votes	%
Eulogio S. Rodriguez Jr.	Nacionalista	53,938	49.57
Ignacio Santos-Diaz	Liberal (Quirino wing)	42,628	39.18
Miguel Cornejo	Liberal (Avelino wing)	11,767	10.81
Guillermo Ventura	Independent	475	0.44
Total		108,808	100.00
Nacionalista gain from Liberal			
Source: Philippine Commission on Elections

=== Municipal Council ===
Five of eight winning candidates came from the Nacionalista Party. Three won from the Liberal Party.

Municipal Council election at Makati's lone district
Party	Candidate	Votes	%
Nacionalista	Ignacio C. Babasa	4,287	
Liberal	Abundio G. Suck	4,031	
Nacionalista	Dionisio S. Flores	3,874	
Liberal	Justino Ventura	3,692	
Nacionalista	Eliseo D. Viray	3,571	
Nacionalista	Amado E. Diaz	3,438	
Nacionalista	Tomas B. Estacio	3,296	
Liberal	Isidro de Leon	3,160	
Nacionalista	Fortunato M. Gutierrez	3,098	
Liberal	Juan Patag	2,874	
Nacionalista	Amado C. de Vera Jr	2,731	
Liberal	Florentino Dimaguila	2,614	
Nacionalista	Jose Gavia	2,487	
Liberal	Jose Alarilla	2,359	
Liberal	Jose Mayor	2,216	
Liberal	Benjamin Bautista	2,083	

=== Controversy ===
Liberal's candidate Isidro de Leon was originally proclaimed as the 8th and final winning councilor on November 18, 1951. On April 12, 1952, or four months and twenty-four days after de Leon's proclamation, Fortunato Gutierrez of the Nacionalista Party, who placed 9th in the municipal council race, filed a petition in the Commission on Elections alleging that due to a mistake in addition the municipal board of canvassers credited de Leon with 3,160 votes when in fact he obtained only 3,060 votes, whereas Gutierrez obtained 3,098 votes, or a majority of 38 votes over de Leon. Respondent petitioned that the municipal board of canvassers be ordered to make a new canvass and a new proclamation declaring him the eighth councilor-elect instead.

On May 26, 1952, de Leon filed a motion to dismiss alleging among other things that the Commission on Elections has no power to order the correction asked for on the ground that the period within which it could be made has already prescribed. This motion was denied and the Commission directed the municipal board of canvassers to reconvene and recanvass the election returns as earlier petitioned for, and, having found that Gutierrez had polled more votes than de Leon, proclaimed the former as the eighth councilor-elect of Makati.

De Leon appealed to the Supreme Court of the Philippines for the reversal of COMELEC's decision. The High Court granted his petition on March 30, 1954, thereby reinstating the original proclamation on November 18, 1951, putting him back as the eighth councilor-elect of Makati.

=== Aftermath ===
Villena was suspended by President Elpidio Quirino on June 19, 1953, due to alleged misconduct. He was succeeded as mayor by Councilor Ignacio Babasa, after the incumbent vice mayor, Bernardo Umali, was also suspended by the Makati Municipal Council, as a result of a separate case filed against him and councilor Abundio Suck. Umali eventually succeeded Babasa as acting mayor in 1954. Villena will run for the mayoral post four more times: in 1955, 1959, 1963, 1967, in which he lost all times to Maximo Estrella.
