= 1935 Philippine constitutional plebiscite =

- 14 May 1935
- Do you vote for the ratification of the Constitution of the Philippines, with the Ordinance appended thereto?
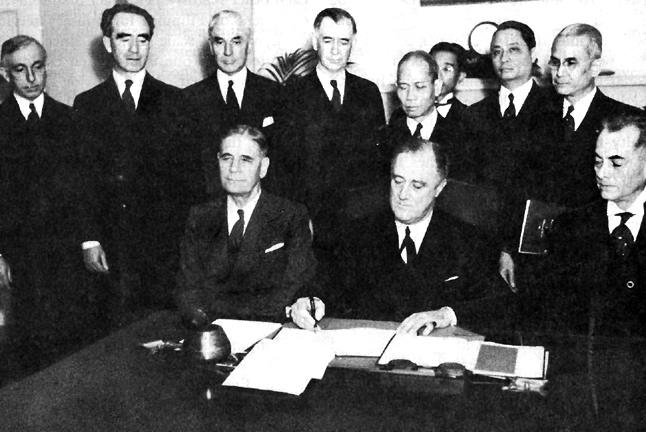
- 23 March 1935: Seated, left to right: George H. Dern, Secretary of War; President Franklin D. Roosevelt, signing the Constitution of the Commonwealth of the Philippines; Manuel L. Quezon, President of the Philippine Senate.

Results
Choice	Votes	%
Yes	1,213,046	96.43%
No	44,963	3.57%
Valid votes	1,258,009	100.00%
Invalid or blank votes	0	0.00%
Total votes	1,258,009	100.00%
Registered voters/turnout	1,935,972	64.98%

A constitutional plebiscite held in the Philippines on 14 May 1935 ratified the 1935 Philippine Constitution which established the Philippine Commonwealth. The constitution had been written in 1934 by the Constitutional Convention of 1934.

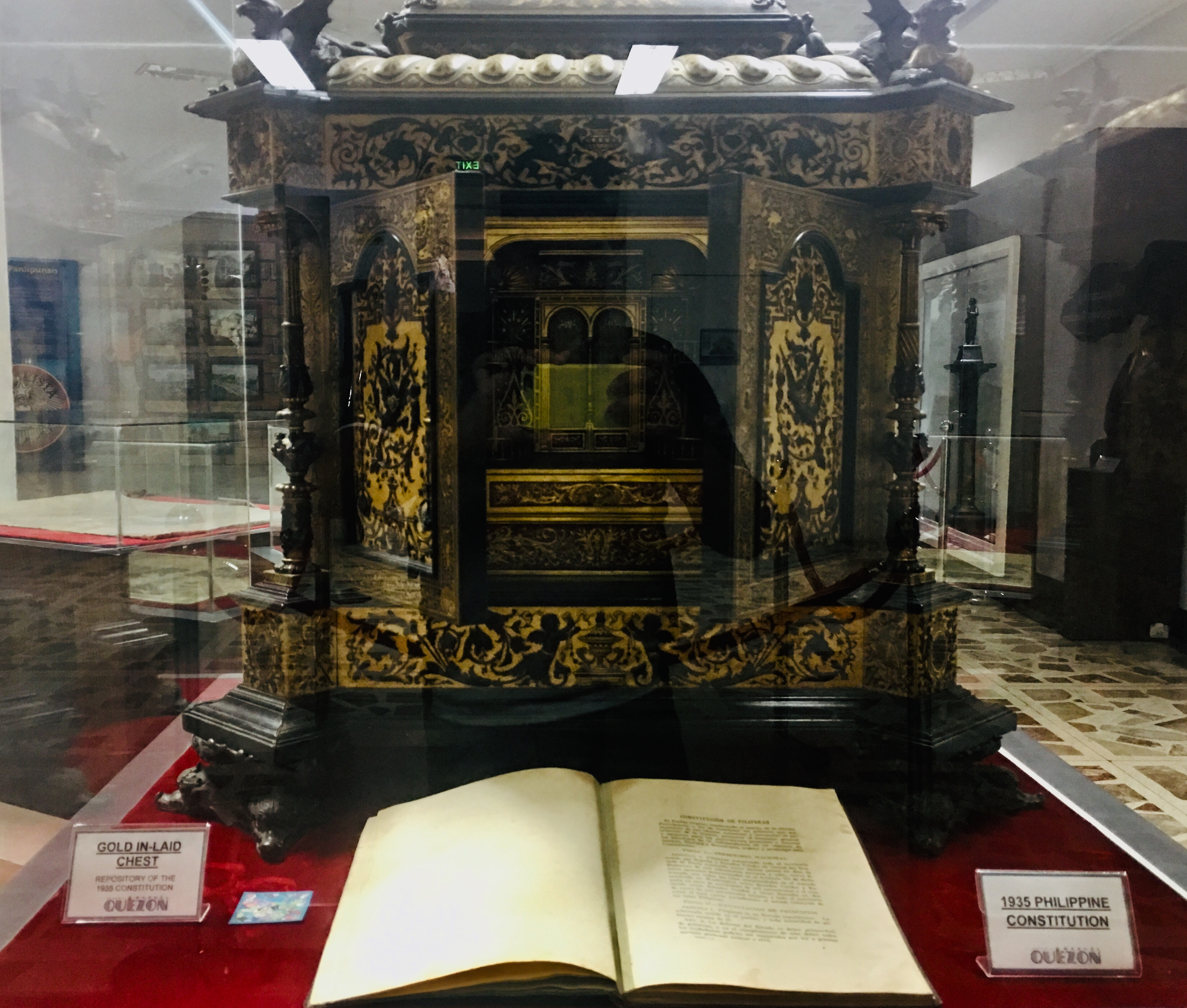
Gold In-Laid Chest (Repository of 1935 Philippine Constitution) displayed at Quezon Museum in Quezon Memorial Circle, Quezon City, Philippines

The Tydings–McDuffie Act of the United States Government detailed the steps required for the Philippines to become independent of the United States. A previous act, the Hare–Hawes–Cutting Act, had been rejected by the Philippine Congress.

The constitution was approved by 96% of voters, and was replaced by the 1973 Constitution of the Philippines.

This is also the first vote in the Philippines in which women participated. 200,000 women were estimated to have taken part. However the new 1935 Constitution abolished women's suffrage granted through Act No. 4112 of 1933 which was never exercised for a regular election. Women's suffrage was later granted at the 1937 plebiscite.

== Question ==
Do you vote for the ratification of the Constitution of the Philippines, with the Ordinance appended thereto?

¿Vota Vd. en favor de la ratificación de la Constitución de Filipinas, con la Ordenanza adscrita a la misma?

== Results ==
Do you vote for the ratification of the Constitution of the Philippines, with the Ordinance appended thereto?
Choice	Votes	%
Yes	1,213,046	96.43
No	44,963	3.57
Total	1,258,009	100.00
Registered voters/turnout	1,935,972	–

1935 Philippine constitutional plebiscite results (excluding invalid votes)
Yes; 1,213,046 (96.4%)
▲50%

=== Results by province ===
Province/City	Yes	No
Abra	9,806	161
Agusan	6,655	163
Albay	39,200	1,084
Antique	13,255	407
Bataan	13,403	165
Batanes	606	582
Batangas	45,771	561
Baguio	557	181
Bohol	33,260	2,229
Bukidnon	1,380	122
Bulacan	46,972	666
Cagayan	19,146	3,355
Camarines Norte	10,994	82
Camarines Sur	28,648	890
Capiz	27,258	153
Cavite	22,189	456
Cebu	51,623	1,712
Cotabato	10,653	510
Davao	4,261	2,232
Ilocos Norte	23,790	1,367
Ilocos Sur	21,551	2,141
Iloilo	65,990	741
Isabela	15,348	2,253
La Union	19,783	1,880
Laguna	43,354	646
Lanao	1,710	1,559
Leyte	67,108	1,225
Manila	48,628	1,197
Marinduque	9,213	136
Masbate	11,891	159
Mindoro	9,034	293
Misamis Occidental	13,035	112
Misamis Oriental	16,285	326
Mountain Province	1,710	1,559
Negros Occidental	55,670	1,039
Negros Oriental	19,805	522
Nueva Ecija	39,983	864
Nueva Vizcaya	4,820	713
Palawan	4,686	868
Pampanga	29,011	1,276
Pangasinan	78,886	3,588
Rizal	56,389	690
Romblon	5,811	352
Samar	34,549	933
Sorsogon	31,736	106
Sulu	1,435	374
Surigao	12,581	814
Tarlac	20,346	898
Tayabas	38,617	728
Zambales	9.968	366
Zamboanga	14,202	595
Total	1,213,046	44,963
Source: Bureau of Printing

== See also ==
- 1934 Philippine Constitutional Convention election
