= 1959 Makati local elections =

Local elections in the Philippines

1959 Makati mayoral election
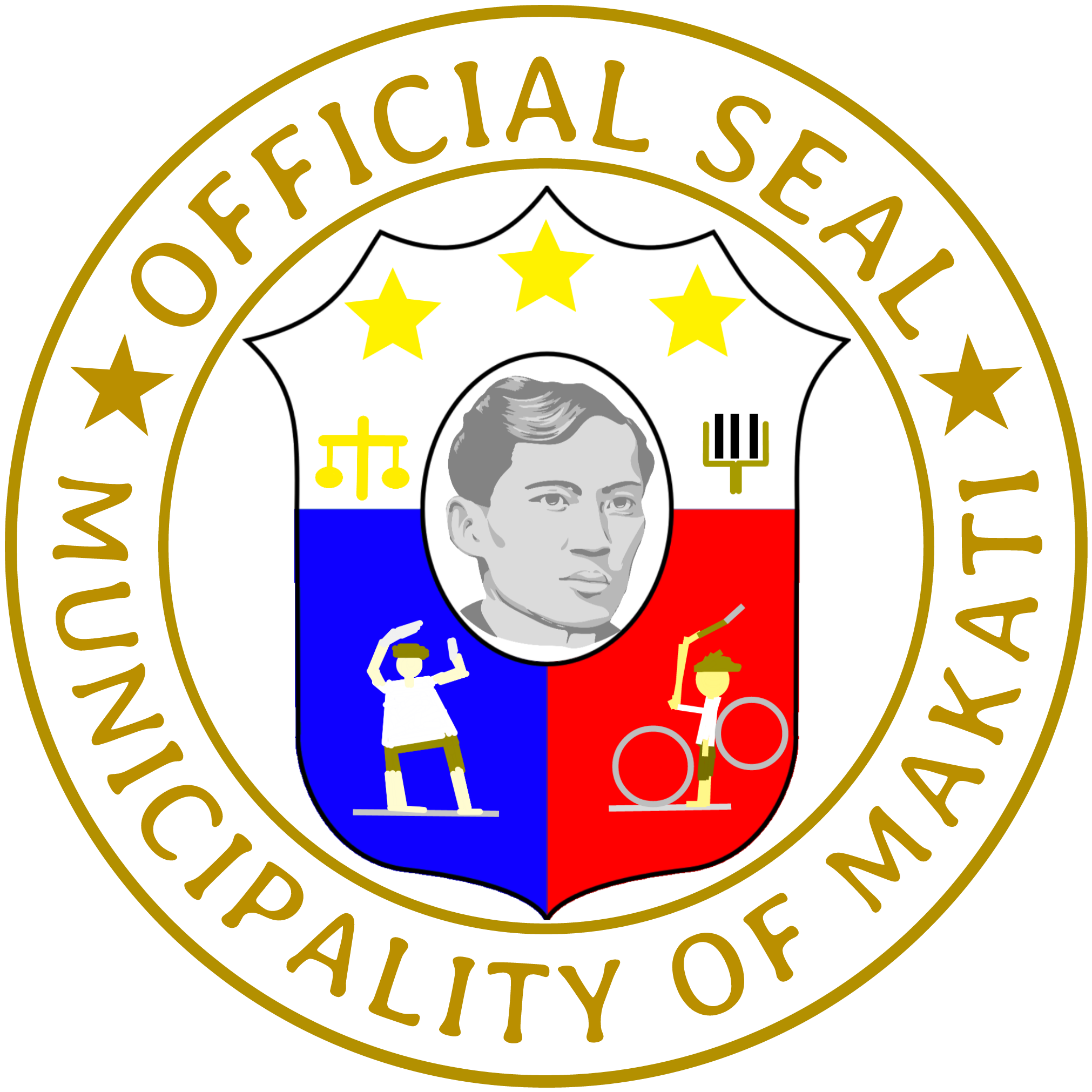
- November 10, 1959
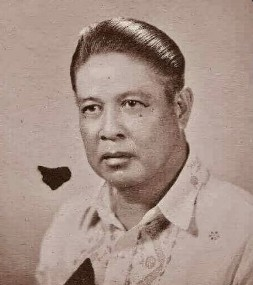

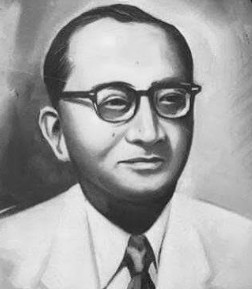
Nominee	Maximo Estrella	Jose D. Villena
Party	Liberal	Nacionalista
Running mate	Juan Patag	Tomas A. Baluyut
Popular vote	16,718	11,164
Mayor before election
Maximo B. Estrella
Liberal
Elected mayor
Maximo B. Estrella
Liberal
- Vice mayoral election

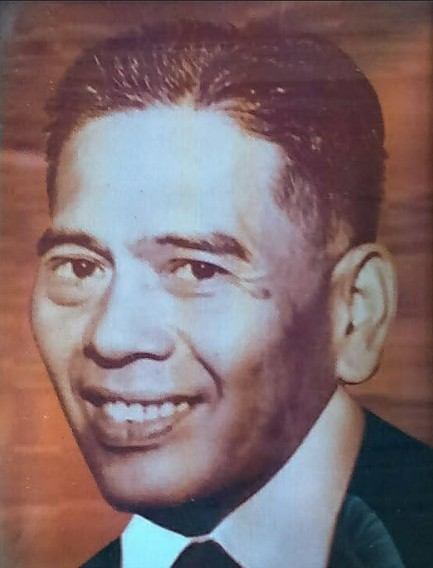
Candidate	Juan Patag	Tomas A. Baluyut
Party	Liberal	Nacionalista
Popular vote	15,847	12,035
Vice Mayor before election
Juan Patag
Liberal
Elected Vice Mayor
Juan Patag
Liberal
- Municipal Council election

8 seats in the Makati Municipal Council 5 seats needed for a majority
	First party	Second party	Third party
Party	Liberal	MCLGG	Independent
Last election	5 seats	Did not participate	Did not participate
Seats won	6	1	1
Seat change	▲1	▲1	▲1

Local elections was held in the Municipality of Makati on November 10, 1959, within the 1959 Philippine local elections, during the administration of President Carlos P. Garcia. The voters elected for the elective local posts in the town: the mayor, vice mayor, and the eight-member local municipal council. The municipality of Makati was then under the jurisdiction of the 1st congressional district of the Province of Rizal. The elections for the district representatives were held in 1957.

== Background ==
Incumbent Makati mayor Maximo Estrella is running for his second term, having been first elected in 1955. Estrella is a staunch candidate of the Liberal Party. He selected incumbent vice-mayor Juan Patag as his running mate.

His challenger for mayor was former Makati mayor Jose D. Villena of the Nacionalista Party. The Makati Nacionalistas coalesced with the Makati Citizens League for Good Government (MCLGG) to field candidates against Estrella's Liberals. It is the second time that Estrella and Villena contended for the position, having battled in 1955, in which Estrella defeated then-incumbent Villena. At the time, Philippine politics was under the Two-party system, dominated by the Liberals and Nacionalistas.

== Candidates ==
=== Liberal Party ===
Name	Party
For Mayor
Maximo B. Estrella	Liberal
For Vice Mayor
Juan Patag	Liberal
For Councilor
Jose Alarilla	Liberal
Ignacio C. Babasa	Liberal
Benjamin Bautista	Liberal
Florentino Dimaguila	Liberal
Teotimo Gealogo	Liberal
Pedro P. Ison	Liberal
Juan E. Tengco	Liberal
Justino Ventura	Liberal

=== Nacionalista Party (NP)-Makati Citizens' League for Good Government (MCLGG) Coalition ===
Name	Party
For Mayor
Jose Daniel S. Villena Sr.	Nacionalista
For Vice Mayor
Tomas A. Baluyut	Nacionalista
For Councilor
Jose Feria	Makati Citizens' League for Good Government
Dionisio S. Flores	Nacionalista
Benjamin Guerra	Nacionalista
Fortunato M. Gutierrez	Nacionalista
Jose Mayor	Makati Citizens' League for Good Government
Pedro Reyes	Nacionalista
Bernardo Umali	Makati Citizens' League for Good Government
Eliseo D. Viray	Nacionalista

=== Independent ===
For Councilor
Jose C. Luciano	Independent

== Results ==
=== Mayor ===
Incumbent mayor Maximo Estrella defeated former mayor Jose D. Villena for the second straight election.

1959 Makati mayoral election
Candidate	Party	Votes	%
Maximo B. Estrella	Liberal	16,718	59.96
Jose Daniel S. Villena Sr.	Nacionalista	11,164	40.04
Total		27,882	100.00
Liberal Party hold			
Source: Philippine Commission on Elections

=== Vice Mayor ===
Incumbent vice mayor Juan Patag won against former vice mayor Tomas Baluyut.

1959 Makati vice mayoral election
Candidate	Party	Votes	%
Juan Patag	Liberal	15,847	56.84
Tomas A. Baluyut	Nacionalista	12,035	43.16
Total		27,882	100.00
Liberal Party hold			
Source: Philippine Commission on Elections

=== Rizal 1st District Representative ===
Benedicto Padilla won as 1st congressional district representative against five other contenders, among them incumbent representative Eulogio S. Rodriguez Jr. The election for this position was held on November 12, 1957. This district holds jurisdiction over the Municipality of Makati.

1957 Rizal's 1st congressional district representative election
Candidate	Party	Votes	%
Benedicto Padilla	Liberal Party	95,080	56.30
Eulogio S. Rodriguez Jr.	Nacionalista Party	68,485	40.56
Ernesto F. Ventura	Nationalist Citizens' Party	4,738	2.81
Erlinda Jamero	Independent	335	0.20
Ulpiano P. Massallo	Philippine Veterans Party	216	0.13
Marcelo R. Peñaflor	Nacionalista Party	15	0.01
Total		168,869	100.00
Liberal gain from Nacionalista			
Source: Philippine Commission on Elections

=== Municipal Council ===
Six of eight winning candidates came from the Liberal Party. One won from the NP-MCLGG Coalition, and another is an independent.

Municipal Council election at Makati's lone district
Party	Candidate	Votes	%
Liberal	Teotimo Gealogo	21,847	
Liberal	Jose Alarilla	20,936	
Liberal	Pedro P. Ison	19,584	
MCLGG	Jose Feria	18,763	
Liberal	Justino Ventura	17,429	
Independent	Jose C. Luciano	16,872	
Liberal	Ignacio C. Babasa	15,638	
Liberal	Juan E. Tengco	14,917	
MCLGG	Bernardo Umali	11,683	
Liberal	Florentino Dimaguila	10,927	
Nacionalista	Eliseo D. Viray	9,846	
MCLGG	Jose Mayor	8,731	
Liberal	Benjamin Bautista	7,594	
Nacionalista	Pedro Reyes	6,482	
Nacionalista	Dionisio S. Reyes	5,367	
Nacionalista	Benjamin Guerra	4,219	
MCLGG	Fortunato M. Gutierrez	3,158	

=== Aftermath ===
Estrella and Villena will meet once again in the 1963 Makati local elections, which Estrella won again for his third term. The would meet again in 1967, in which Estrella again won.
