= 1967 Makati local elections =

Local elections in the Philippines

1967 Makati mayoral election
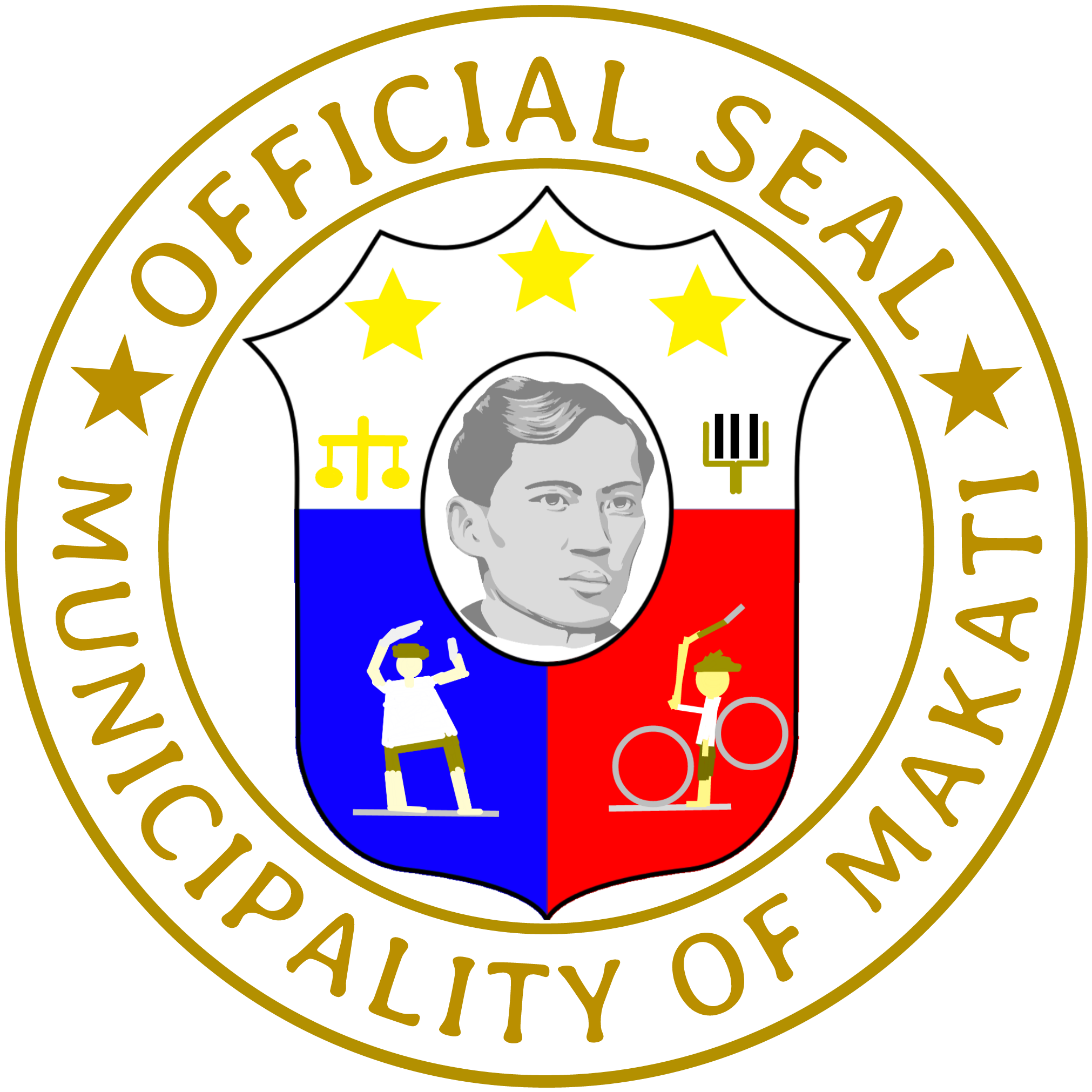
- November 14, 1967
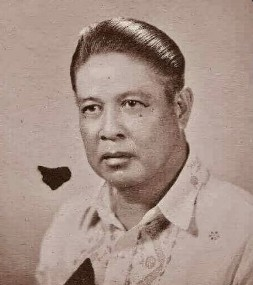

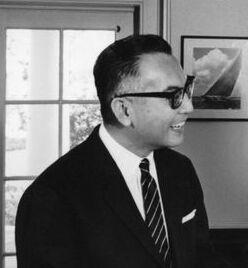

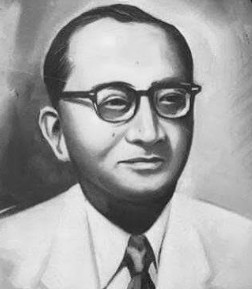
| Nominee | Maximo Estrella | Amelito R. Mutuc | Jose D. Villena |
| Party | Liberal | Nacionalista | Independent |
| Running mate | Teotimo Gealogo | Nestor de Villa |
| Popular vote | 28,413 | 17,418 | 177 |
| Nominee | Manuel Fuentes |
| Party | Independent |
| Popular vote | 137 |
Mayor before election
Maximo B. Estrella
Liberal
Elected mayor
Maximo B. Estrella
Liberal
- Vice mayoral election

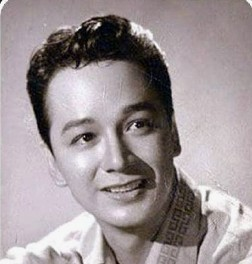
| Candidate | Teotimo Gealogo | Nestor de Villa | Benilo Jose |
| Party | Liberal | Nacionalista | Independent |
| Popular vote | 23,150 | 21,329 | 600 |
Vice Mayor before election
Juan Patag
Liberal
Elected Vice Mayor
Teotimo Gealogo
Liberal
- Municipal Council election

8 seats in the Makati Municipal Council 5 seats needed for a majority
| | First party | Second party |
|---|---|---|
| Party | Liberal | Nacionalista |
| Last election | 7 seats | 0 seats |
| Seats won | 8 | 0 |
| Seat change | ▲1 | Same position |

Local elections was held in the Municipality of Makati on November 14, 1967, within the 1967 Philippine local elections, during the administration of President Ferdinand Marcos.The voters elected for the elective local posts in the town: the mayor, vice mayor, and the eight-member local municipal council. The municipality of Makati was then under the jurisdiction of the 1st congressional district of the Province of Rizal. The elections for the district representatives were held in 1965.

== Background ==
Incumbent Makati mayor Maximo Estrella is running for his fourth term, having been first elected in 1955 and reelected in 1959 and 1963. Estrella is a staunch candidate of the Liberal Party. He selected incumbent councilor Teotimo Gealogo as his vice-mayoralty candidate.

His challengers for mayor were former ambassador Amelito Mutuc of the Nacionalista Party, former mayor Jose D. Villena, and independent candidate Manuel Fuentes. At the time, Philippine politics was under the Two-party system, dominated by the Liberals and Nacionalistas.

Actor Gines F. Soriano, popularly known as Nestor de Villa ran for vice mayor under Amelito Mutuc's Nacionalista Party lineup.

== Candidates ==
=== Liberal Party ===
| Name | Party |
For Mayor
| Maximo B. Estrella | Liberal |
For Vice Mayor
| Timoteo Gealogo | Liberal |
For Councilor
| Cesar C. Alzona | Liberal |
| Ignacio C. Babasa | Liberal |
| Pedro P. Ison | Liberal |
| Jose C. Luciano | Liberal |
| Bernardo P. Nonato | Liberal |
| Juan E. Tengco | Liberal |
| Justino Ventura | Liberal |
| Johnny S. Wilson | Liberal |

=== Nacionalista Party ===
| Name | Party |
For Mayor
| Amelito R. Mutuc | Nacionalista |
For Vice Mayor
| Nestor de Villa | Nacionalista |
For Councilor
| Jose Alarilla | Nacionalista |
| Tomas A. Baluyut | Nacionalista |
| Benjamin Bautista | Nacionalista |
| Oscar Calvento | Nacionalista |
| Amado de Vera Jr. | Nacionalista |
| Rafael C. Gaite | Nacionalista |
| Michael M. Joseph | Nacionalista |
| Filomena Villamor | Nacionalista |

=== Independent ===
| Name | Party |
For Mayor
| Manuel Fuentes | Independent |
| Jose Daniel S. Villena Sr. | Independent |
For Vice Mayor
| Benilo Jose | Independent |

== Results ==
=== Mayor ===
Incumbent mayor Maximo Estrella handily won for his fourth term, defeating former ambassador Amelito Mutuc, former Makati mayor Jose Villena, and independent candidate Manuel Fuentes.

1967 Makati mayoral election
| Candidate | Party | Votes | % |
|---|---|---|---|
| Maximo B. Estrella | Liberal Party | 28,413 | 61.57 |
| Amelito R. Mutuc | Nacionalista Party | 17,418 | 37.75 |
| Jose Daniel S. Villena Sr. | Independent | 177 | 0.38 |
| Manuel Fuentes | Independent | 137 | 0.30 |
| Total | | 46,145 | 100.00 |
| Liberal Party hold | | | |
Source: Philippine Commission on Elections

=== Vice Mayor ===
Councilor Teotimo Gealogo won against actor Nestor de Villa and independent candidate Benilo Jose.

1967 Makati vice mayoral election
| Candidate | Party | Votes | % |
|---|---|---|---|
| Teotimo Gealogo | Liberal Party | 23,150 | 51.35 |
| Nestor de Villa | Nacionalista Party | 21,329 | 47.31 |
| Benilo Jose | Independent | 600 | 1.33 |
| Total | | 45,079 | 100.00 |
| Liberal Party hold | | | |
Source: Philippine Commission on Elections

=== Rizal 1st District Representative ===
Eddie Ilarde won as 1st congressional district representative against 4 other contenders, among them incumbent representative Rufino Antonio. The election for this position was held on November 9, 1965. This district holds jurisdiction over the Municipality of Makati.

1965 Rizal's 1st congressional district representative election
| Candidate | Party | Votes | % |
|---|---|---|---|
| Eddie Ilarde | Independent | 138,683 | 39.11 |
| Rufino D. Antonio | Liberal Party | 116,811 | 32.94 |
| Damaso S. Flores | Nacionalista Party | 91,517 | 25.81 |
| Amando B. Isip | Nacionalista Party Independent | 7,394 | 2.09 |
| Eliseo T. de Guzman | Independent | 187 | 0.05 |
| Total | | 354,592 | 100.00 |
| Independent gain from Liberal | | | |
Source: Philippine Commission on Elections

=== Municipal Council ===
All eight winning candidates came from the Liberal Party.

Municipal Council election at Makati's lone district
| Party | Candidate | Votes | % |
|---|---|---|---|
| Liberal | Jose C. Luciano | 25,938 | |
| Liberal | Justino Ventura | 25,301 | |
| Liberal | Johnny S. Wilson | 24,609 | |
| Liberal | Pedro P. Ison | 24,328 | |
| Liberal | Bernardo P. Nonato | 21,993 | |
| Liberal | Ignacio C. Babasa | 20,156 | |
| Liberal | Juan E. Tengco | 19,912 | |
| Liberal | Cesar C. Alzona | 18,190 | |
| Nacionalista | Michael M. Joseph | 17,969 | |
| Nacionalista | Tomas A. Baluyut | 16,847 | |
| Nacionalista | Jose Alarilla | 15,932 | |
| Nacionalista | Rafael C. Gaite | 14,781 | |
| Nacionalista | Amado C. de Vera Jr | 13,694 | |
| Nacionalista | Oscar Calvento | 12,583 | |
| Nacionalista | Benjamin Bautista | 11,427 | |
| Nacionalista | Filomena Villamor | 9,865 | |

=== Aftermath ===
Mayor Maximo Estrella was later suspended on June 20, 1969, after the Supreme Court granted Councilor Jose Luciano's petition to suspend Estrella, Vice Mayor Teotimo Gealogo, and councilors Justino Ventura, Pedro Ison, Ignacio Babasa and Bernardo Nonato. The case stemmed from the criminal information therefore substantially charged that, on or about July 26, 1967, Mayor Estrella and his co-accused, conspiring and confederating together, unlawfully entered into a contract with JEF Enterprises for delivery and installation of 59 traffic deflectors valued at ₱1,426.50 (equivalent to ₱126,085 in 2021) each, 34 units thereof having been delivered, installed and paid for in the total amount of ₱48,841.00 (equivalent to ₱4,316,955 in 2021), less 10% which was retained, such contract being manifestly and grossly disadvantageous to the municipal government of Makati and to the latter's prejudice. Estrella was succeeded as mayor by Luciano, who assumed the position for being the top-voted councilor in the 1967 elections because Vice Mayor Gealogo was also suspended.
