= 1963 Makati local elections =

Local elections in the Philippines

1963 Makati mayoral election
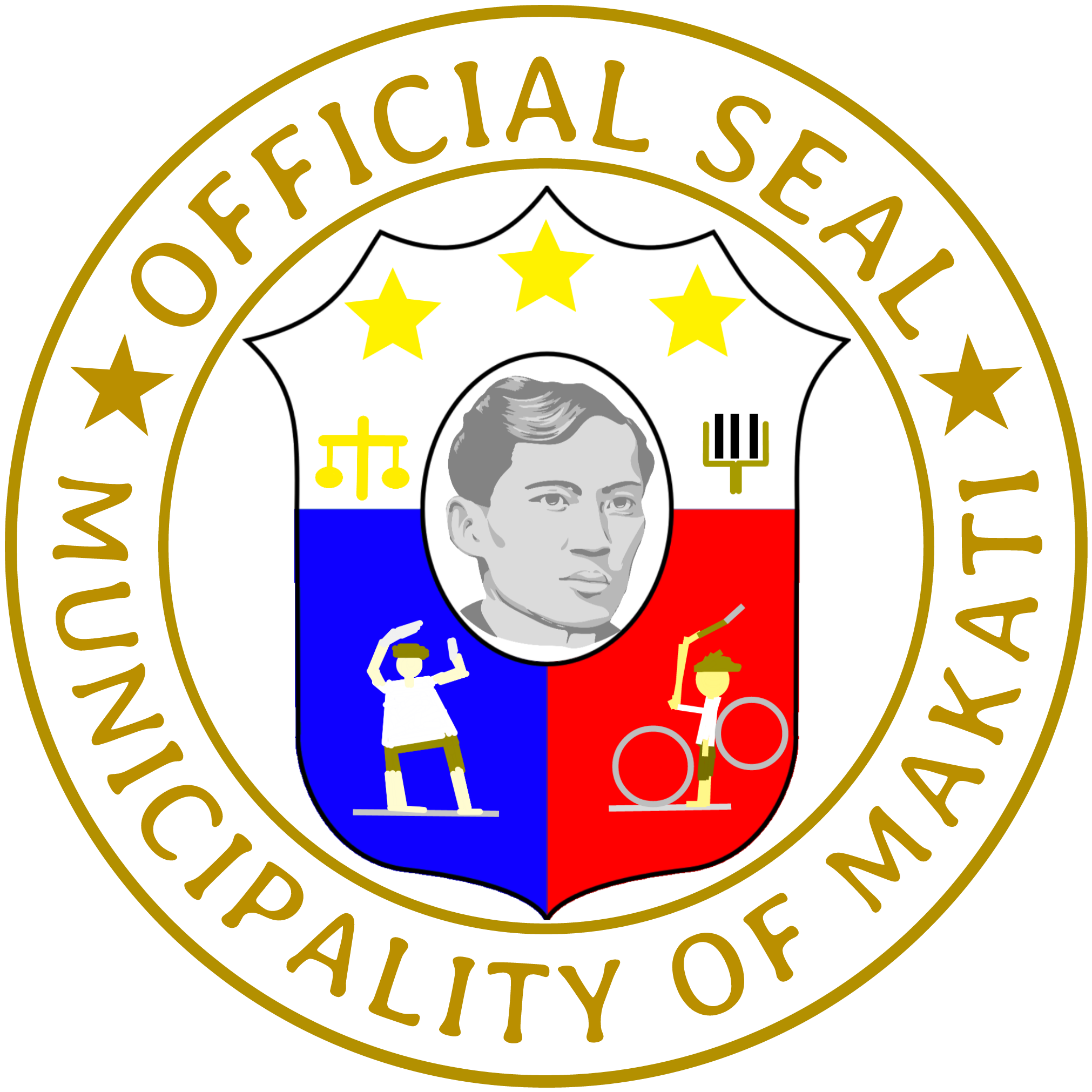
- November 12, 1963
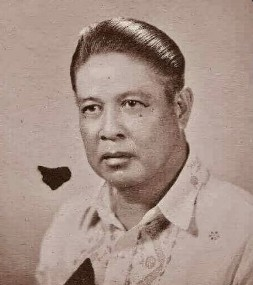

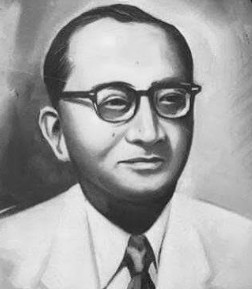
Nominee	Maximo Estrella	Jose D. Villena
Party	Liberal	Nacionalista
Running mate	Juan Patag	Tomas A. Baluyut
Popular vote	28,186	8,047
Mayor before election
Maximo B. Estrella
Liberal
Elected mayor
Maximo B. Estrella
Liberal
- Vice mayoral election

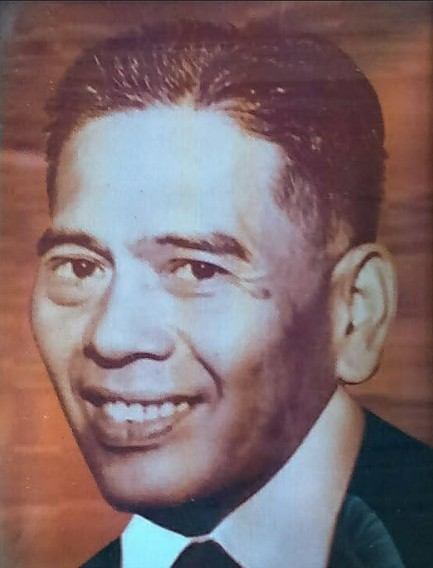
Candidate	Juan Patag	Tomas A. Baluyut	Isidro Sequera
Party	Liberal	Nacionalista	Independent
Popular vote	17,616	10,140	6,984
Vice Mayor before election
Juan Patag
Liberal
Elected Vice Mayor
Juan Patag
Liberal
- Municipal Council election

8 seats in the Makati Municipal Council 5 seats needed for a majority
	First party	Second party	Third party
Party	Liberal	MCLGG	Nacionalista
Last election	6 seats	1 seat	0 seats
Seats won	7	1	0
Seat change	▲1	Same position	Same position
	Fourth party
Party	Independent
Last election	1 seat
Seats won	0
Seat change	▼1

Local elections was held in the Municipality of Makati on November 12, 1963, within the 1963 Philippine local elections, during the administration of President Diosdado Macapagal. The voters elected for the elective local posts in the town: the mayor, vice mayor, and the eight-member local municipal council. The municipality of Makati was then under the jurisdiction of the 1st congressional district of the Province of Rizal. The elections for the district representatives were held in 1961.

== Background ==
Incumbent Makati mayor Maximo Estrella is running for his third term, having been first elected in 1955 and reelected in 1959. Estrella is a staunch candidate of the Liberal Party. He selected incumbent vice-mayor Juan Patag as his running mate.

His challenger for mayor was former Makati mayor Jose D. Villena of the Nacionalista Party. A third party, the Makati Citizens League for Good Government (MCLGG), broke ranks with the Nacionalistas and fielded their own candidates for councilors. It is the third time that Estrella and Villena contended for the position, having battled in 1955 and 1959. At the time, Philippine politics was under the Two-party system, dominated by the Liberals and Nacionalistas.

== Candidates ==
=== Liberal Party ===
Name	Party
For Mayor
Maximo B. Estrella	Liberal
For Vice Mayor
Juan Patag	Liberal
For Councilor
Cesar C. Alzona	Liberal
Ignacio C. Babasa	Liberal
Teotimo Gealogo	Liberal
Pedro P. Ison	Liberal
Jose C. Luciano	Liberal
Bernardo P. Nonato	Liberal
Juan E. Tengco	Liberal
Justino Ventura	Liberal

=== Nacionalista Party ===
Name	Party
For Mayor
Jose Daniel S. Villena Sr.	Nacionalista
For Vice Mayor
Tomas A. Baluyut	Nacionalista
For Councilor
Dionisio S. Flores	Nacionalista
Benjamin Guerra	Nacionalista
Fortunato M. Gutierrez	Nacionalista
Jose Mayor	Nacionalista
Pedro Reyes	Nacionalista
Fernando Suva	Nacionalista
Filomena Villamor	Nacionalista
Eliseo D. Viray	Nacionalista

=== Makati Citizens' League for Good Government (MCLGG) ===
Name	Party
For Councilor
Maria Lourdes Cacho-Soriano	Makati Citizens' League for Good Government
Jose Feria	Makati Citizens' League for Good Government
Filomeno Pico	Makati Citizens' League for Good Government
José E. Romero	Makati Citizens' League for Good Government
Gustavo Victoriano	Makati Citizens' League for Good Government

=== Independent ===
Name	Party
For Vice Mayor
Isidro Sequera	Independent

== Results ==
=== Mayor ===
Incumbent mayor Maximo Estrella handily won for his third term, defeating former mayor Jose D. Villena by over 20,000 votes.

1963 Makati mayoral election
Candidate	Party	Votes	%
Maximo B. Estrella	Liberal Party	28,186	77.79
Jose Daniel S. Villena Sr.	Nacionalista Party	8,047	22.21
Total		36,233	100.00
Liberal Party hold			
Source: Philippine Commission on Elections

=== Vice Mayor ===
Incumbent vice mayor Juan Patag won against former vice mayor Tomas Baluyut and independent candidate Isidro Sequera.

1963 Makati vice mayoral election
Candidate	Party	Votes	%
Juan Patag	Liberal Party	17,616	50.71
Tomas A. Baluyut	Nacionalista Party	10,140	29.19
Isidro Sequera	Independent	6,984	20.10
Total		34,740	100.00
Liberal Party hold			
Source: Philippine Commission on Elections

=== Rizal 1st District Representative ===
Rufino Antonio won as 1st congressional district representative against ten other contenders, among them incumbent representative Benedicto Padilla. The election for this position was held on November 14, 1961. This district holds jurisdiction over the Municipality of Makati.

1961 Rizal's 1st congressional district representative election
Candidate	Party	Votes	%
Rufino D. Antonio	Liberal Party	81,888	32.45
Jaime Ferrer	Nacionalista Party	75,027	29.73
Benedicto Padilla	Liberal Party	74,365	29.47
Juvencio Ortañez	Nacionalista Party Independent	9,325	3.70
Florante Villegas	Liberal Party	3,812	1.51
Baltazar G. Cuyugan	Nationalist Citizens' Party	2,992	1.19
Apolinario E. Sogueco	Nacionalista Party	1,974	0.78
Miguel Cornejo	Independent	1,102	0.44
Jose L. Rodriguez	Nacionalista Party	861	0.34
Melquiades G. Virata	Nacionalista Party	854	0.34
George C. Gorostiza	Independent	162	0.06
Total		252,362	100.00
Liberal hold			
Source: Philippine Commission on Elections

=== Municipal Council ===
Seven of eight winning candidates came from the Liberal Party. Jose Feria is the lone winning candidate from the NP-MCLGG coalition.

1963 Makati Municipal Council election
Party	Candidate	Votes	%
Liberal	Justino Ventura	18,534	
Liberal	Pedro P. Ison	18,458	
Liberal	Teotimo Gealogo	18,080	
Liberal	Jose C. Luciano	15,241	
Liberal	Juan E. Tengco	14,101	
Liberal	Ignacio C. Babasa	13,785	
Liberal	Bernardo P. Nonato	12,804	
MCLGG	Jose Feria	12,620	
MCLGG	Maria Lourdes "Marilou" Cacho-Soriano	12,099	
Nacionalista	Fernando Suva	8,463	
MCLGG	José E. Romero	8,215	
Liberal	Cesar C. Alzona	7,914	
Nacionalista	Eliseo D. Viray	7,386	
MCLGG	Gustavo Victoriano	7,005	
MCLGG	Jose Mayor	6,927	
Nacionalista	Pedro Reyes	6,514	
Nacionalista	Dionisio S. Flores	5,873	
Nacionalista	Benjamin Guerra	5,216	
Nacionalista	Fortunato M. Gutierrez	4,681	
Nacionalista	Filomena Villamor	8,448	
MCLGG	Filomeno Pico	4,126	

=== Aftermath ===
Estrella and Villena will meet once again in the 1967 Makati local elections, which Estrella won again for his fourth term. It would be Mayor Estrella's last term however, as he was suspended (and later resigned) from the post due to a case filed against him by councilor and future mayor Jose Luciano in 1969.
